= Black darter =

Black darter is a common name for several animals and may refer to:

- Etheostoma duryi, a fish
- Sympetrum danae, a dragonfly
