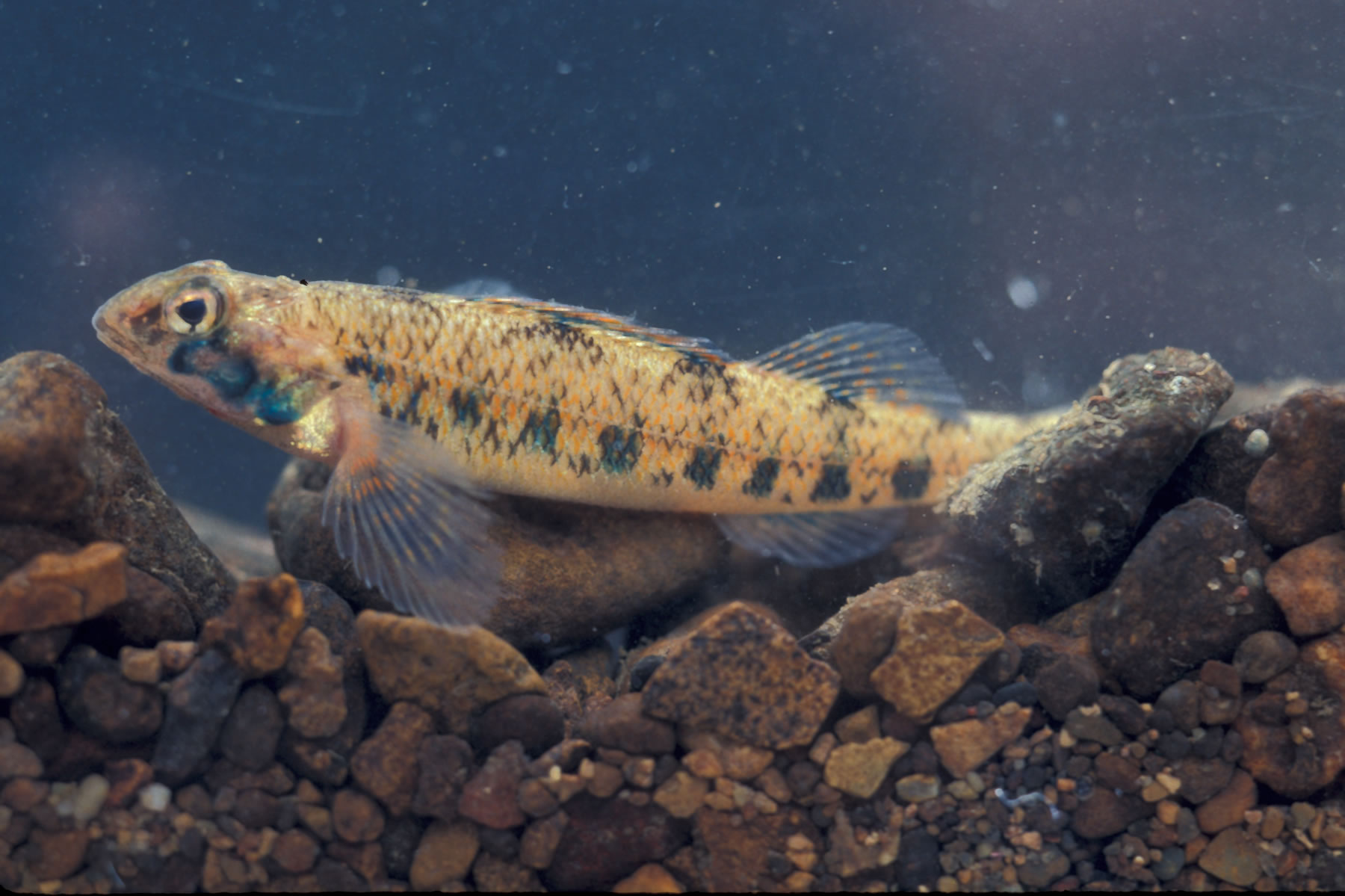
- Etheostoma jessiae

Conservation status
- Least Concern (IUCN 3.1)

Scientific classification
- Kingdom: Animalia
- Phylum: Chordata
- Class: Actinopterygii
- Order: Perciformes
- Family: Percidae
- Genus: Etheostoma
- Species: E. jessiae

Binomial name
- Etheostoma jessiae (D. S. Jordan & Brayton, 1878)

Synonyms
- Poecilichthys jessiae D. S. Jordan & Brayton, 1878

= Blueside darter =

Species of fish

The blueside darter (Etheostoma jessiae) is usually found in the Tennessee River drainage in Tennessee, Alabama, North Carolina, and Virginia, and less commonly found in Bear Creek, Shoal Creek, and Barren Fork.

== Etymology ==
The specific name jessiae refers to Jessie Brayton, wife of the junior author of the species.

== Introduction ==
This is a description of a monitoring plan for the blueside darter (Etheostoma jessiae). Etheostoma are a genus of small freshwater fish commonly referred to as Darters. Darters occur throughout the Tennessee River drainage, excluding the upper Clinch and Powell Rivers from Whiteoak Creek, Humphreys county, Tennessee, upstream into the French Broad River system, North Carolina. The blueside darter is a member of the subgenus Doration. Originally all darters in this subgenus were identified as a single species, but this group has been described as being a highly variable species thus the species has been differentiated into five separate species, the blueside darter being one of the newer species.

The blueside darter has a long, pointed snout with a narrow frenum on the upper lip, a relatively large mouth, and a deep blue body (compared to turquoise-blue). The male blueside darters have 9–10 W-shaped bars along their sides, which appear as solid blue square blotches confined to the lateral area during the spawning season. The dorsal side of the blueside darter has six hourglass-shaped saddles and is diffusely speckled. They have a spiny dorsal fin with a blue band and a wide orange band immediately dorsal to it. The soft dorsal, caudal, and pectoral fins are dusky with distinct orange stippling in all rays. Iridescent blue is restricted to the pre-opercle and lower opercles. Males are very brightly colored during breeding season

Currently the blueside darter is listed as a species of least concern because its range of occurrence, number of subpopulations, and population size are relatively large, and because the species is probably not declining fast enough to qualify for any of the threatened categories. The total adult population size is unknown but surpasses 10.000 individuals. However, in some parts of its range the population is slowly declining due to anthropogenic factors such as siltation, agricultural runoff, and water pollution. Reintroductions and water quality improvement measures have been underway in areas where population trends are dwindling.

== Geographic Distribution ==
The range of the blueside darter is maintained in the Southeastern portion of North America. The blueside darter inhabits most of the middle and upper Tennessee River drainage in Tennessee, Alabama, Georgia, North Carolina, Virginia, and Mississippi. It has also been reported in scattered collections in Bear, Barren Fork, Second, and Shoal creek systems, which are all tributaries of the Tennessee River. The extent of the occurrence is approximately 20,000 square kilometres (7,700 sq mi).

== Ecology ==
The blueside darter thrives in benthopelagic freshwater systems. Their preferred habitat is in rocky pools and adjacent riffles of clear creeks and small fast rivers with sand and gravel substrate and moderate gradient, and commonly in slow to moderate flow, in shallow margins of pools and runs, as well as in streams characterized in general by moderate to swift flows. The differences in substrate are dependent upon depth and movement of water so it is difficult to determine whether substrate or water flow is a defining characteristic in habitat choice.

A study completed by Schilling in 2009 conveyed that blueside darters seemed to maintain a fairly shallow depth in the water column with a maximum depth of 60 cm (24 in). Due to the seasonal variations in the regions where blueside darters occur, temperatures vary depending on the time of year and do not limit micro-habitat selection. The Schilling experiment also indicated that the blueside darter did show tolerance to conductivity changes with an average pH for micro-sites being slightly basic which is indicative to limestone rock substrate. Populations have been relatively stable in most areas where the blueside occurs however, in a few areas scientists have noted a downward trend in population sizes. Anthropogenic factors that may be to blame for this decline are water pollution, run-off from agriculture, and siltation.

== Life History ==
Most darters have specific habitat requirements regarding substrate composition, water velocity, and water depth. Harrison (2004) suggested that darters have specialized reproductive behaviors which may make suitable spawning habitat limiting factor. The blueside darter spawns once a year when water temperatures reach 21–23 °C (70–73 °F) roughly during March through May throughout the range, however in Tennessee spawning starts between mid-February and mid-March with reproduction occurring April to early May. Spawning occurs in deeper riffles than those used by Etheostoma stigmaeum. Female blueside darters show increased fecundity as they grow longer. At one year of age large females are sexually mature but there is limited data on male sexual maturity.

Darters have two spawning behaviors; they either bury the eggs in the substrate or attach the eggs to an object. Blueside darters bury their eggs in riffle habitats with fine or coarse gravel sand substrate in moderate current. The male pursues a female and mounts her and she lays 3–5 eggs in the gravel. The eggs hatch after around 8–10 days after an incubation temperature of 21–23 °C (70–73 °F). Blueside darter diet consists of midge larvae, microcrustaceans, and mayfly nymphs. The males have been known to produce Schreckstoff substances that serve to warn nearby fish in case of an attack.

== Current Management ==
One area where populations have been declining due to toxic effluents is the Pigeon River which begins in Haywood County, North Carolina, and flows into the French Broad River in Tennessee. A paper plant began releasing toxins into the water in 1908 which led to degradation of not only the Pigeon River but the toxins flowed 79 miles downstream into the French Broad River system. The water pollution extirpated several species of mollusks and fish including the blueside darter.

Champion Paper International, currently called Blue Ridge Paper Products, has since made changes to the plant to improve water quality but has not entirely eliminated all the pollution. Of the 24 non-game species that were extirpated from the Pigeon and French Broad River systems due to water pollution from the paper plant, 8 species have been re-introduced by the Pigeon River Recovery Project. In the southeastern United States, there have been few re-introductions and even fewer attempts to monitor their success. The project's goal has been to reintroduce as many of those extirpated species as possible into locations where successful restoration is favorable.

== Management Recommendations ==
A recommendation for future management of the blueside darter is to initiate transporting individuals from other locations into areas where the populations have been reduced or extirpated. However, since some darter populations are too small to remove and not easy to find, initiating captive propagation of the species may be the best alternative management plan. Results from previous management programs have had successful results with captive propagation and they have provided crucial information on the species habitat requirements and spawning behaviors and requirements. Captive propagation may be the most critical management tool in order to re-establish populations of these small non-game fish.
