= Sequatchie darter =

Scientific classification
- Kingdom: Animalia
- Phylum: Chordata
- Class: Actinopterygii
- Order: Perciformes
- Family: Percidae
- Genus: Etheostoma
- Species: E. sequatchiense

Binomial name
- Etheostoma sequatchiense (Burr, 1979)

Species of fish

The Sequatchie darter (Etheostoma sequatchiense) is a species of freshwater ray-finned fish, a darter from the subfamily Etheostomatinae, part of the family Percidae, which also contains the perches, ruffes and pikeperches. It is endemic to the eastern United States, where it occurs only in the Sequatchie River in Tennessee. It is considered by some authorities to be a subspecies of the blenny darter (Etheostoma blennius).
