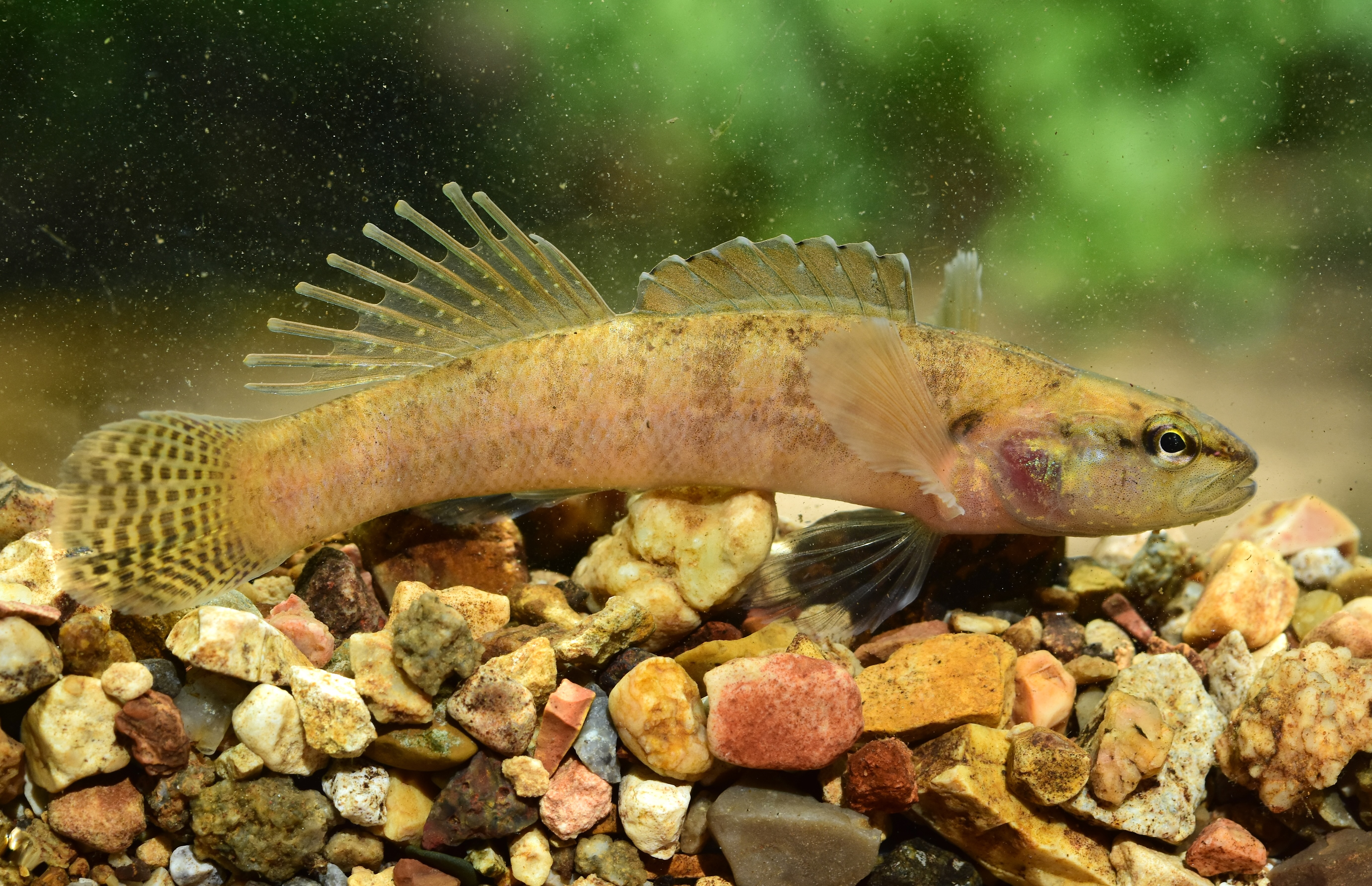

Conservation status
- Least Concern (IUCN 3.1)

Scientific classification
- Kingdom: Animalia
- Phylum: Chordata
- Class: Actinopterygii
- Order: Perciformes
- Family: Percidae
- Genus: Etheostoma
- Species: E. oophylax

Binomial name
- Etheostoma oophylax Ceas & Page, 1992

= Guardian darter =

Species of fish

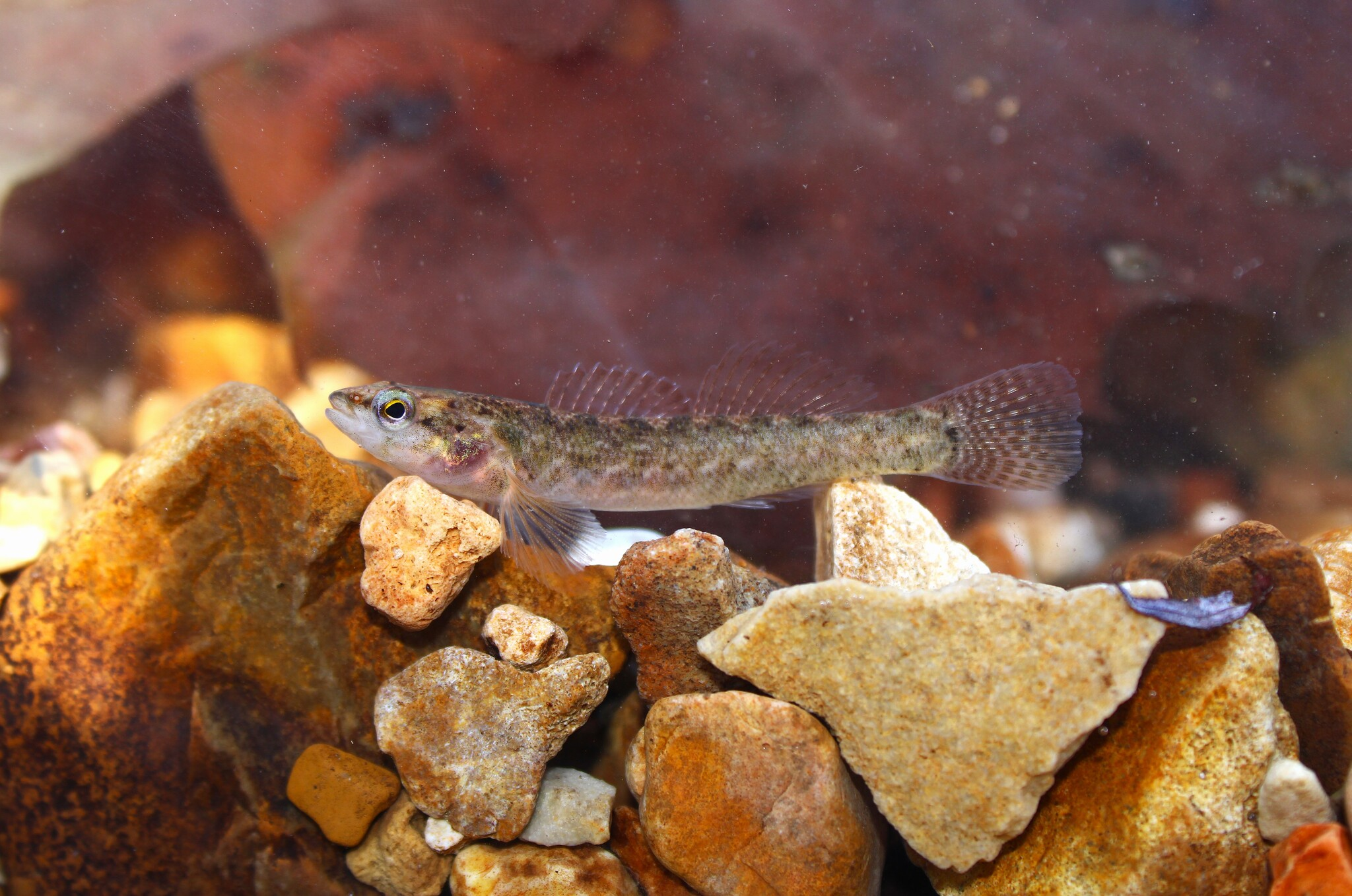
An Etheostoma oophylax pictured in the United States

The guardian darter (Etheostoma oophylax) is a species of freshwater ray-finned fish, a darter from the subfamily Etheostomatinae, part of the family Percidae, which also contains the perches, ruffes and pikeperches. It is endemic to the eastern United States. This species inhabits creeks and headwaters, living in pools with gentle currents and adjacent riffles. This species can reach a length of 7.4 centimetres (2.9 in) SL.
