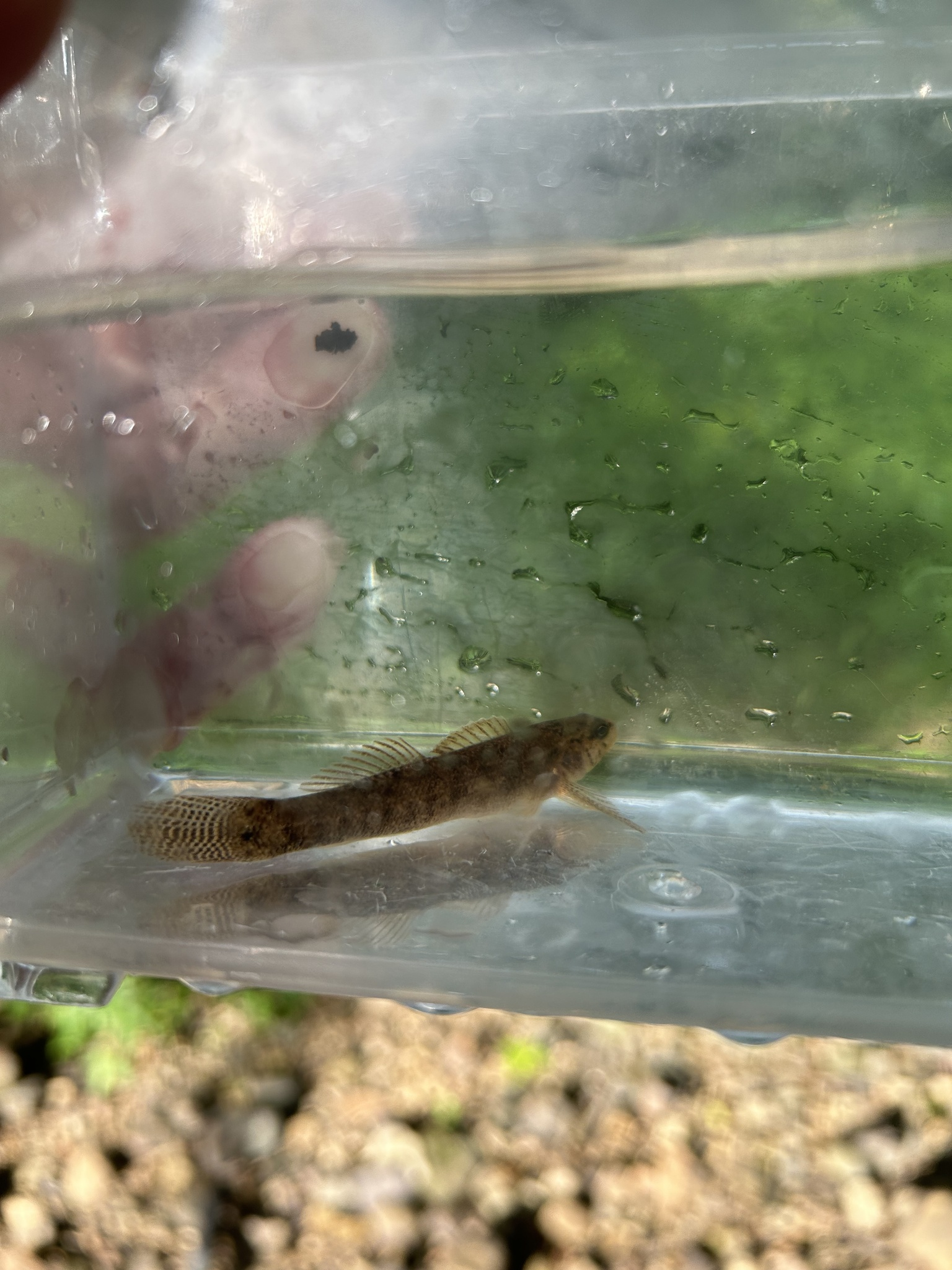

Conservation status
- Near Threatened (IUCN 3.1)

Scientific classification
- Kingdom: Animalia
- Phylum: Chordata
- Class: Actinopterygii
- Order: Perciformes
- Family: Percidae
- Genus: Etheostoma
- Species: E. neopterum

Binomial name
- Etheostoma neopterum W. M. Howell & Dingerkus, 1978

= Lollipop darter =

Species of fish

The lollipop darter (Etheostoma neopterum) is a species of freshwater ray-finned fish, a darter from the subfamily Etheostomatinae, part of the family Percidae, which also contains the perches, ruffes and pikeperches. It is endemic to the eastern United States. Lollipop darters are approximately 1.4 to 2.4 inches (3.6 to 6.1 cm) long.

== Distribution ==
The range of the lollipop darter is restricted to the Shoal Creek system in northwest Alabama and south-central Tennessee.

== Ecology ==
Lollipop darters live in stagnant, shallow and clear water.

The lollipop darter eats larvae, insects, and small crayfish. Their predators are any fish larger than they are. Crayfish are predators to the fry and potentially to the adults based on the size of the crayfish.

== Lifecycle ==
Female lollipop darters mature at one year of age, whereas the males take two years to mature. Spawning occurs from March to May. If temperatures are not in their preferred range, they will delay reproduction for that breeding season.

The male gets a specific color on a dorsal fin during breeding time. The lollipop darter is in the group known as egg-mimic darters. Males make a cavity under stones and other objects. The eggs are laid in a cluster under objects in the cavities where the males protect them. They fertilize the eggs externally. The female will spawn multiple times with the male before leaving. Males can mate with more than one female over the course of the breeding season. When males breed with more than one female, they will guard all the nests they have.

== Management ==
The lollipop darter is being considered for the endangered species list in the state of Tennessee. In Alabama, it is illegal to capture and transport this species of darter. It is a potential endangered species and is up for debate to be added to the list. It is a threatened species due to its low population and small range. Their habitat encompasses only 135 square miles (350 km^{2}).
