= Duck darter =

Conservation status
- Least Concern (IUCN 3.1)

Scientific classification
- Kingdom: Animalia
- Phylum: Chordata
- Class: Actinopterygii
- Order: Perciformes
- Family: Percidae
- Genus: Etheostoma
- Species: E. planasaxatile

Binomial name
- Etheostoma planasaxatile (Powers & Mayden, 2007)

Species of fish

The Duck darter (Etheostoma planasaxatile) is a rare species of freshwater ray-finned fish, a darter from the subfamily Etheostomatinae, part of the family Percidae, which also contains the perches, ruffes and pikeperches. It is endemic to the eastern United States, where it occurs in the Duck River drainage in Tennessee. It inhabits current-swept rocky pools and adjacent riffles of creeks and small to medium rivers.
