= Seagreen darter =

Conservation status
- Least Concern (IUCN 3.1)

Scientific classification
- Kingdom: Animalia
- Phylum: Chordata
- Class: Actinopterygii
- Order: Perciformes
- Family: Percidae
- Genus: Etheostoma
- Species: E. thalassinum

Binomial name
- Etheostoma thalassinum (D. S. Jordan & Brayton, 1878)

Synonyms
- Nothonotus thalassinus Jordan & Brayton, 1878

Species of fish

The seagreen darter (Etheostoma thalassinum) is a species of freshwater ray-finned fish, a darter from the subfamily Etheostomatinae, part of the family Percidae, which also contains the perches, ruffes and pikeperches. It is found in the Santee River drainage of North and South Carolina. It inhabits rocky riffles of creeks and small to medium rivers. This species can reach a length of 8.0 cm (3.1 in), though most only reach about 6.0 cm (2.4 in).
