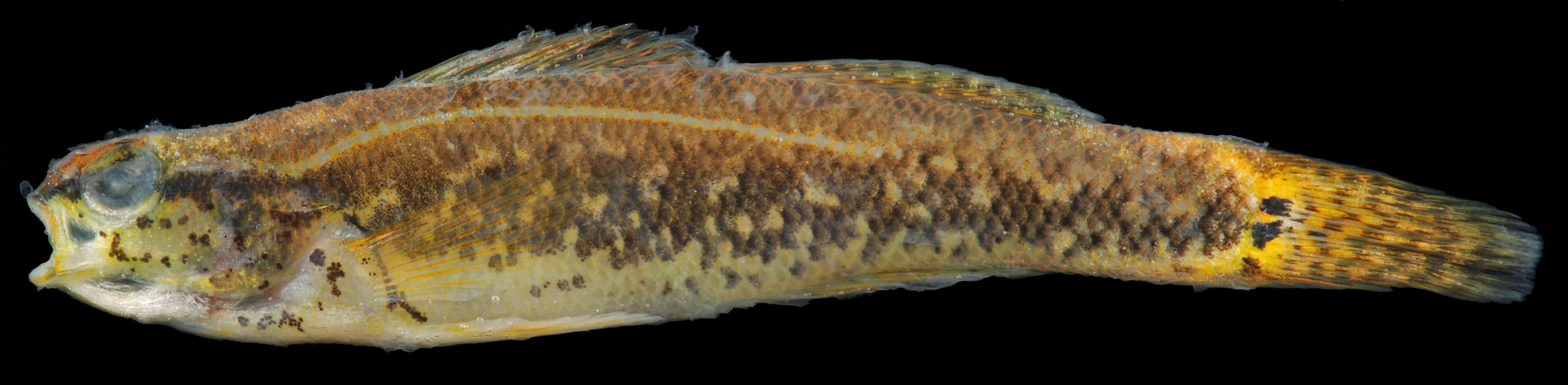

Conservation status
- Least Concern (IUCN 3.1)

Scientific classification
- Kingdom: Animalia
- Phylum: Chordata
- Class: Actinopterygii
- Order: Perciformes
- Family: Percidae
- Genus: Etheostoma
- Species: E. serrifer

Binomial name
- Etheostoma serrifer (Hubbs & Cannon, 1935)

Synonyms
- Hololepis serrifer Hubbs & Cannon, 1935

= Sawcheek darter =

Species of fish

The Sawcheek darter (Etheostoma serrifer) is a species of freshwater ray-finned fish, a darter from the subfamily Etheostomatinae, part of the family Percidae, which also contains the perches, ruffes and pikeperches. It is endemic to the eastern United States, where it occurs in the Atlantic coastal plain from Great Dismal Swamp of southern Virginia to Altamaha River drainage of Georgia. It occurs near vegetation in swamps, lakes, sluggish headwaters, creeks and small rivers. This species can reach a length of 6.8 cm (2.7 in).
