= Riverweed darter =

Conservation status
- Least Concern (IUCN 3.1)

Scientific classification
- Kingdom: Animalia
- Phylum: Chordata
- Class: Actinopterygii
- Order: Perciformes
- Family: Percidae
- Genus: Etheostoma
- Species: E. podostemone

Binomial name
- Etheostoma podostemone Jordan & Jenkins, 1889

Species of fish

The riverweed darter (Etheostoma podostemone) is a species of freshwater ray-finned fish, a darter from the subfamily Etheostomatinae, part of the family Percidae, which also contains the perches, ruffes and pikeperches. It is endemic to the eastern United States, where it occurs in the upper Roanoke River drainage in Virginia and North Carolina. It inhabits rocky riffles of creeks and small rivers. This species can reach a length of 7.6 cm (3.0 in).
