= West Rim darter =

Conservation status
- Least Concern (IUCN 3.1)

Scientific classification
- Kingdom: Animalia
- Phylum: Chordata
- Class: Actinopterygii
- Order: Perciformes
- Family: Percidae
- Genus: Etheostoma
- Species: E. occidentale

Binomial name
- Etheostoma occidentale Powers & Mayden, 2007

Species of fish

The West Rim darter (Etheostoma occidentale) is a species of freshwater ray-finned fish, a darter from the subfamily Etheostomatinae, part of the family Percidae, which also contains the perches, ruffes and pikeperches. It is endemic to the eastern United States, where it occurs in the Cumberland River from Whites Creek in Tennessee to the Little River in Kentucky. It inhabits current-swept rocky pools and adjacent riffles of creeks and small to medium rivers.
