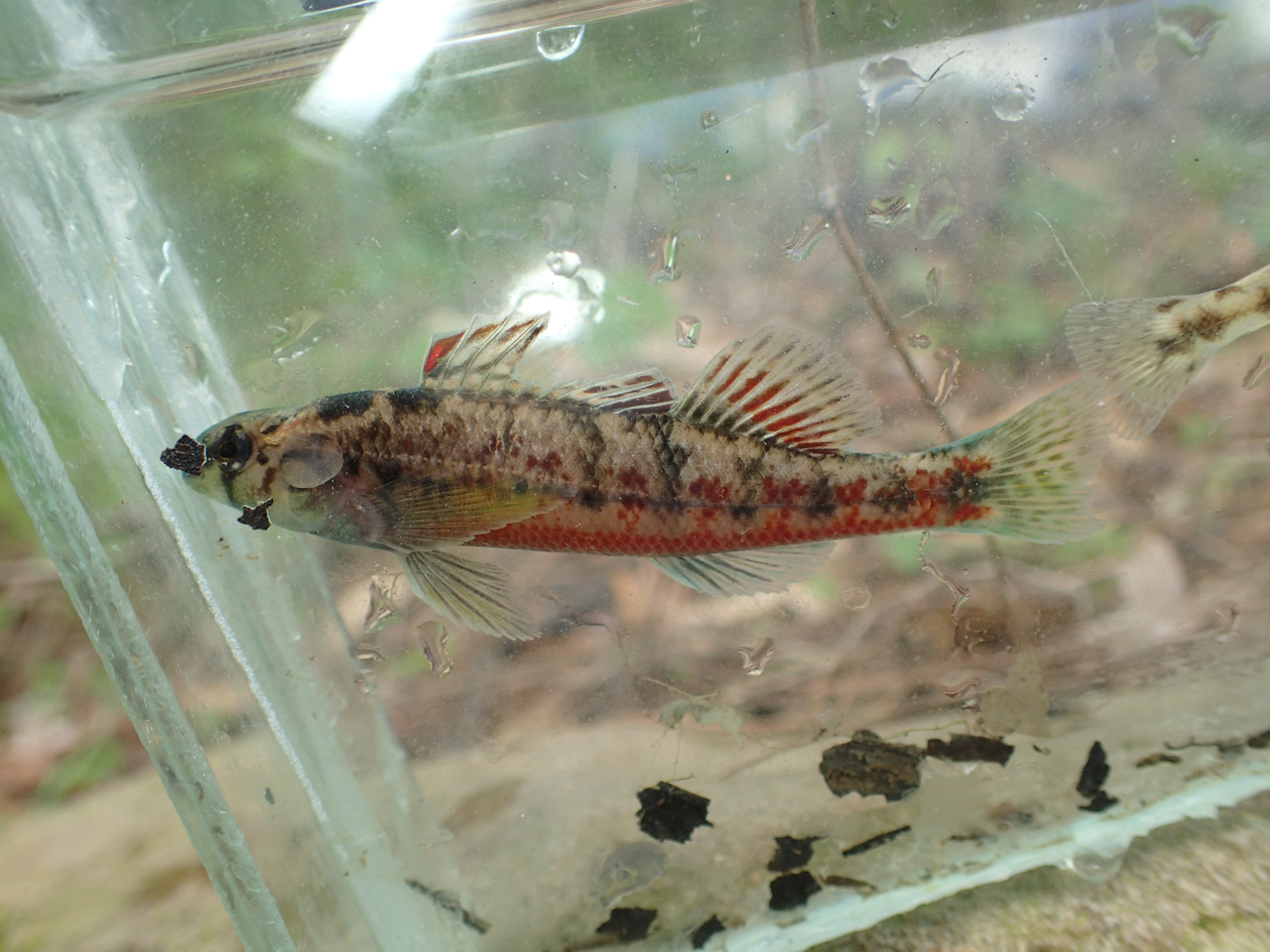

Conservation status
- Critically Endangered (IUCN 3.1)

Scientific classification
- Kingdom: Animalia
- Phylum: Chordata
- Class: Actinopterygii
- Division: Teleostei
- Order: Perciformes
- Family: Percidae
- Genus: Etheostoma
- Species: E. chermocki

Binomial name
- Etheostoma chermocki Boschung, Mayden & Tomelleri, 1992

= Vermilion darter =

Species of fish

The vermilion darter (Etheostoma chermocki) is a species of freshwater ray-finned fish, a darter from the subfamily Etheostomatinae, part of the family Percidae, which also contains the perches, ruffes and pikeperches. It is endemic to the southern United States, where it only is found in Turkey Creek in Jefferson County, Alabama, part of the Mobile Bay drainage basin. It was first described by Herbert Boschung in 1992, who was the curator of ichthyology at the University of Alabama, along with biologist Richard Mayden and scientific illustrator Joseph Tomelleri. On December 7, 2010, the US Fish and Wildlife Service designated 13 mi (21 km) of Turkey Creek watershed as critical habitat for the darter. According to the IUCN, the population of this fish is declining.

== Physical Description ==
The vermilion darter was given its name due to its vermilion (red) color on its ventral or belly side below the lateral line. Adult males can have bluish lower fins while females and juveniles have olive/yellow bodies with eight darker stripes across the top of the fish. The red spots on males' dorsal fins are larger than those on the females. The darters can reach between 1.8 and 2.8 inches (45 to 71.1 mm) long and has a very short head. Vermilion darters can live up to 3 years old, unlike other darter species that usually only live around 1 ½ years old.

== Habitat ==
This species exists only in inland freshwater. The vermilion darter can only be found in approximately 12 km (7.5 miles) of the upper area of Turkey Creek and lower areas of two tributaries in Jefferson County, Alabama. The creek consists of moderate flows and cobble/gravel substrates with emergent and submersed aquatic vegetation. Vegetation included in these creeks are Potamogeton (pondweed), Ceratophyllum (Coontail) and Myriophyllum (water milfoil).

== Diet ==
While it is difficult to study this species because they are endangered, some stomach contents of vermilion darter specimens have been examined. They are opportunistic (they eat from a variety of sources), stream-bottom feeders with the most common prey items found were larva of midges, crane flies and caddisflies. Also found were fish eggs and some aquatic vegetation. As with most species, as the fish grows larger the items consumed will be larger in size.

== Reproduction and Migration ==
While no extensive research has been done on the life cycles of the vermilion darters, it is considered to be very similar to other darter species. Looking at specimens from the University of Alabama Ichthyological Collection (UAIC), Geological Survey of Alabama (GSA) and Tulane University Museum of Natural History (TU), we know that the males have pale yellow testes, and the females have orange/amber ovaries. The fish reach sexual maturity around one year old. Once sexual maturity is reached the males have courtship displays to attract the females, this takes place from January to April when breeding season begins.^{[8]} The breeding season is believed to be from March to June and the sex ratio is 2:1 females to males. Darters are spawning fish that lay eggs, and there is only one location known that the vermilion darters use for spawning. This location is the juncture of Turkey Creek and the Tapawingo and Penny Springs. The females on average lay 65 eggs a year with no parental care needed. The babies emerge around 6 to 8 days later and stay in the same location as the older fish. Currently, there has been no evidence of a migration pattern or ontogenetic movements in these fish, likely being no need to migrate due to their small habitat and location in Turkey Creek, Alabama.

External image
- image from Turkey Creek Nature Preserve site, [https://turkeycreeknp.com)
