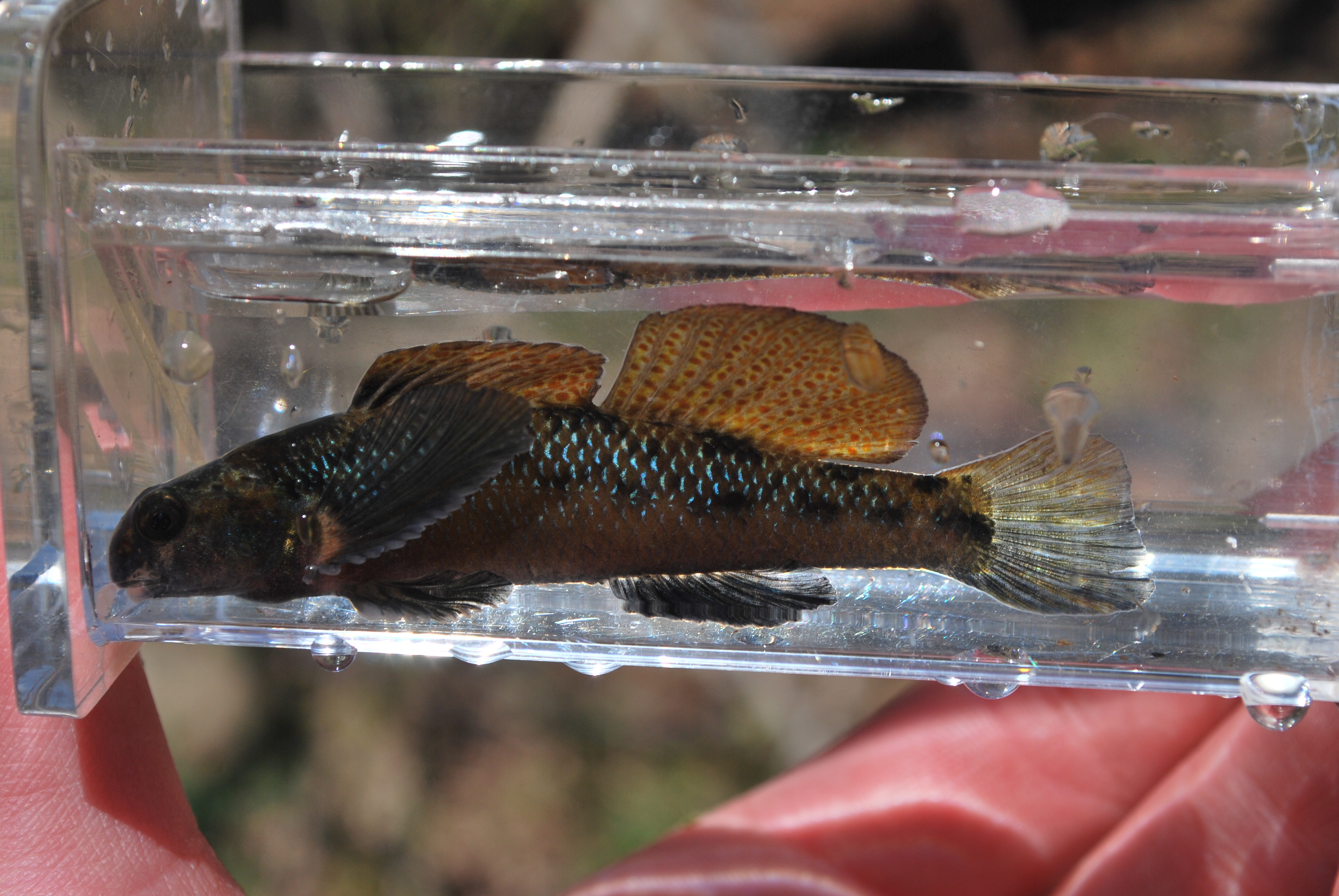

Conservation status
- Least Concern (IUCN 3.1)

Scientific classification
- Kingdom: Animalia
- Phylum: Chordata
- Class: Actinopterygii
- Order: Perciformes
- Family: Percidae
- Genus: Etheostoma
- Species: E. longimanum

Binomial name
- Etheostoma longimanum (D.S. Jordan, 1888)

= Longfin darter =

Species of fish

The longfin darter (Etheostoma longimanum) is a species of freshwater ray-finned fish, a darter from the subfamily Etheostomatinae, part of the family Percidae, which also contains the perches, ruffes and pikeperches. It is endemic to the eastern United States, where it occurs in the upper James River drainage in Virginia and West Virginia. It inhabits rocky riffles of creeks and small rivers. This species can reach a length of 8.9 cm (3.5 in).
