= Meramec saddled darter =

Conservation status
- Least Concern (IUCN 3.1)

Scientific classification
- Kingdom: Animalia
- Phylum: Chordata
- Class: Actinopterygii
- Order: Perciformes
- Family: Percidae
- Genus: Etheostoma
- Species: E. erythrozonum

Binomial name
- Etheostoma erythrozonum (Switzer & R. M. Wood, 2009)

Species of fish

The Meramec saddled darter (Etheostoma erythrozonum) is a species of freshwater ray-finned fish, a darter from the subfamily Etheostomatinae, part of the family Percidae, which also contains the perches, ruffes and pikeperches. It is endemic to the eastern United States, where it occurs in the larger streams of the Meramec River drainage of Missouri. It inhabits fast gravel and rubble riffles of small to medium rivers . This species can reach a length of 7.1 cm (2.8 in).
