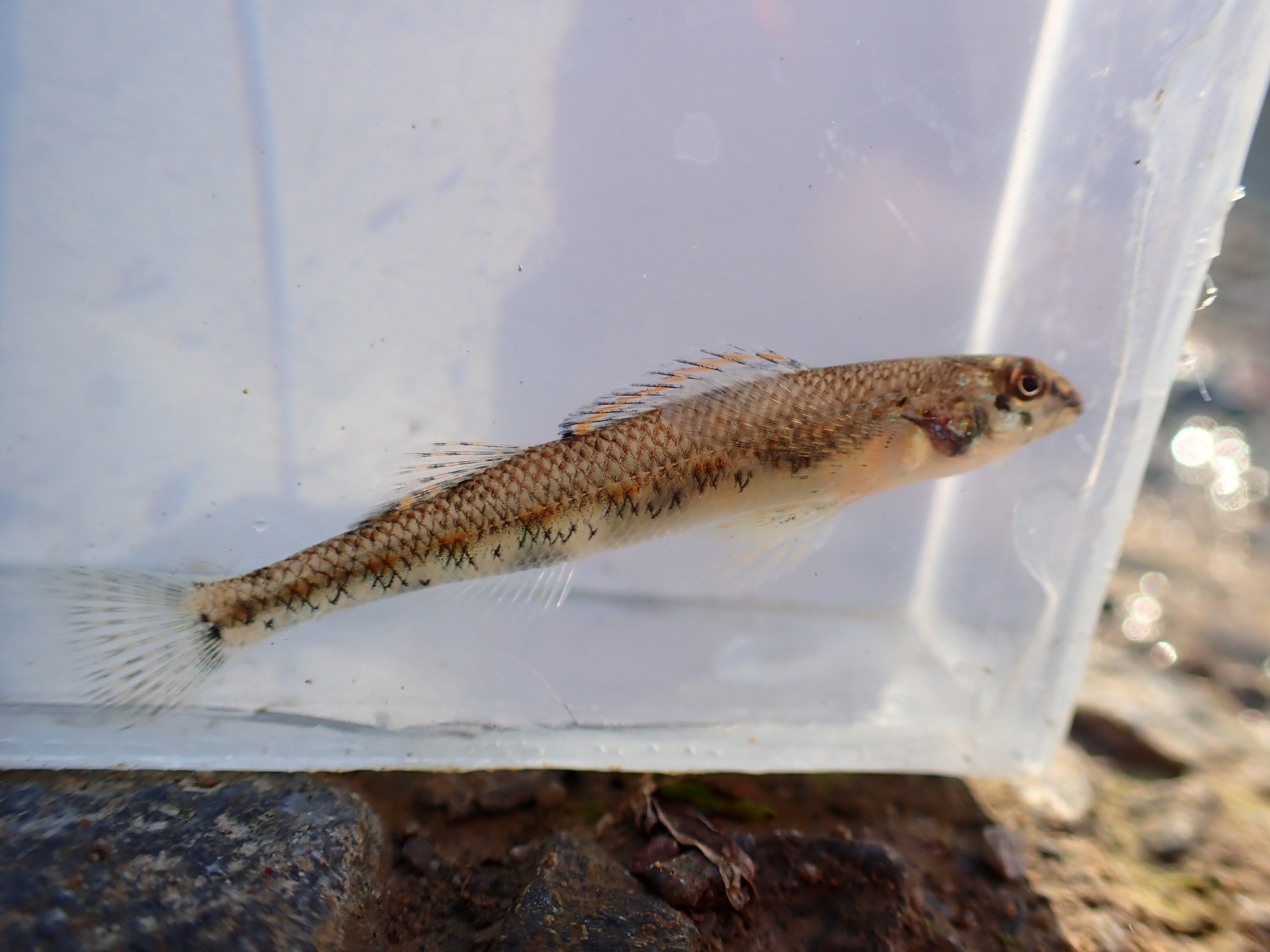

Scientific classification
- Kingdom: Animalia
- Phylum: Chordata
- Class: Actinopterygii
- Order: Perciformes
- Family: Percidae
- Genus: Etheostoma
- Species: E. gore

Binomial name
- Etheostoma gore Layman & Mayden, 2012

= Etheostoma gore =

Warioto darter

Species of fish

Etheostoma gore (Warioto darter, or Cumberland darter) is a freshwater fish found in Kentucky and Tennessee in the Cumberland River drainage below Cumberland Falls. It was named after the 45th vice-president of the United States, Al Gore, for his environmental vision, commitment, and accomplishments throughout decades of public service and his role in educating the public and raising awareness on the issue of global climate change.

== See also ==
- List of organisms named after famous people (born 1925–1949)
