= Rock darter =

Conservation status
- Least Concern (IUCN 3.1)

Scientific classification
- Kingdom: Animalia
- Phylum: Chordata
- Class: Actinopterygii
- Order: Perciformes
- Family: Percidae
- Genus: Etheostoma
- Species: E. rupestre

Binomial name
- Etheostoma rupestre C. H. Gilbert & Swain, 1887

Species of fish

The rock darter (Etheostoma rupestre) is a species of freshwater ray-finned fish, a darter from the subfamily Etheostomatinae, part of the family Percidae, which also contains the perches, ruffes and pikeperches. It is endemic to the southeastern United States where it is found only in Mobile Bay drainage. It is an inhabitant of swiftly flowing riffles of creeks to medium-sized rivers. This species can reach a length of 8.3 centimetres (3.3 in) TL though most only reach about 6 centimetres (2.4 in).
