= East Rim darter =

Conservation status
- Least Concern (IUCN 3.1)

Scientific classification
- Kingdom: Animalia
- Phylum: Chordata
- Class: Actinopterygii
- Order: Perciformes
- Family: Percidae
- Genus: Etheostoma
- Species: E. orientale

Binomial name
- Etheostoma orientale Powers & Mayden, 2007

Species of fish

The East Rim darter (Etheostoma orientale) is a species of freshwater ray-finned fish, a darter from the subfamily Etheostomatinae, part of the family Percidae, which also contains the perches, ruffes and pikeperches. It is endemic to the eastern United States. The species has a range of 400–2000 sq. miles across tributaries of the Cumberland River from Fishing Creek in Kentucky to just below the Obey River in Tennessee. It inhabits current-swept rocky pools and adjacent riffles of creeks and small to medium rivers.

Population is believed to exceed 10,000; this fish is common. Number of recorded occurrences is 6–80, but is uncertain. Population is believed to be stable; change of less than 10% annually. Overall trend of the past 10 years is uncertain, but believed to be stable.
