= Saluda darter =

Scientific classification
- Kingdom: Animalia
- Phylum: Chordata
- Class: Actinopterygii
- Order: Perciformes
- Family: Percidae
- Genus: Etheostoma
- Species: E. saludae

Binomial name
- Etheostoma saludae (Hubbs & Cannon, 1935)

Synonyms
- Hololepsis saludae Hubbs & Cannon

Species of fish

The Saluda darter (Etheostoma saludae) is a species of freshwater ray-finned fish, a darter from the subfamily Etheostomatinae, part of the family Percidae, which also contains the perches, ruffes and pikeperches. It is endemic to the eastern United States, where it occurs in the Saluda River of South Carolina. It inhabits mud-bottomed, sand-bottomed, and rock-bottomed pools of slow to moderate headwaters and creeks. This species can reach a length of 4.3 cm (1.7 in). It is plain in color with brown on the back and sides and a yellow to white belly. The sides have a dozen or so brown blotches and are speckled with brown dots. Some authorities treat this taxon as a synonym of the Carolina darter (E. collis).
