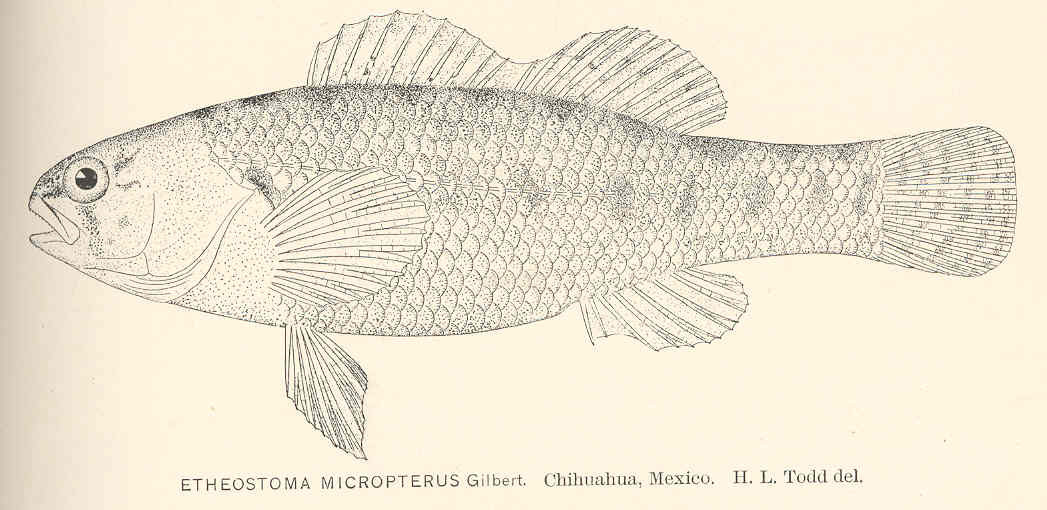

Conservation status
- Least Concern (IUCN 3.1)

Scientific classification
- Kingdom: Animalia
- Phylum: Chordata
- Class: Actinopterygii
- Order: Perciformes
- Family: Percidae
- Genus: Etheostoma
- Species: E. pottsii

Binomial name
- Etheostoma pottsii (Girard, 1859)

Synonyms
- Aplesion pottsii Girard, 1859

= Mexican darter =

Species of fish

The Mexican darter (Etheostoma pottsii), also known as the Chihuahua darter or Mexican darter, is a species of freshwater ray-finned fish, a darter from the subfamily Etheostomatinae, part of the family Percidae, which also contains the perches, ruffes and pikeperches. It is endemic to Mexico where it is the only species of darter to naturally occur in the Pacific drainage. This species can reach a length of 5.5 centimetres (2.2 in) TL.
