= Chickasaw darter =

Conservation status
- Near Threatened (IUCN 3.1)

Scientific classification
- Kingdom: Animalia
- Phylum: Chordata
- Class: Actinopterygii
- Order: Perciformes
- Family: Percidae
- Genus: Etheostoma
- Species: E. cervus

Binomial name
- Etheostoma cervus Powers & Mayden, 2003

Species of fish

The Chickasaw darter (Etheostoma cervus) is a small species of freshwater ray-finned fish, a darter from the subfamily Etheostomatinae, part of the family Percidae, which also contains the perches, ruffes and pikeperches. It is endemic to the Forked Deer River system in western Tennessee, where it is an inhabitant of smaller streams. This species can reach a length of 5.2 cm (2.0 in).
