= Splendid darter =

Conservation status
- Least Concern (IUCN 3.1)

Scientific classification
- Kingdom: Animalia
- Phylum: Chordata
- Class: Actinopterygii
- Order: Perciformes
- Family: Percidae
- Genus: Etheostoma
- Species: E. barrenense

Binomial name
- Etheostoma barrenense Burr & Page, 1982

Species of fish

The splendid darter (Etheostoma barrenense) is a species of freshwater ray-finned fish, a darter from the subfamily Etheostomatinae, part of the family Percidae, which also contains the perches, ruffes and pikeperches. It is endemic to the Barren River system in south-central Kentucky and north-central Tennessee. This species is usually found in small rocky pools on the sides of creeks and rivers.

The splendid darter, like many other darter species, inhabits a single small river system and exhibits specialized reproductive behaviors that are only supported by a particular type of environment. This river system is vulnerable to even the slightest changes, whether natural or anthropogenic, putting inhabitants of the system at risk. The two most influential landscape features affecting the current distribution of E. barrenense are land use/land cover patterns and soil composition. As such, these two phenomena must be closely monitored in the following years to ensure the safety of the splendid darter and all other species found in the Barren River system.

The current existence and continuing development of dams in Tennessee is one of the most pressing issues affecting freshwater environments and preventing many species of fish from migrating properly.

== Distribution ==
The splendid darter is found only in the Barren River system of southern central Kentucky and northern central Tennessee; this system is a part of the Ohio River drainage. The range of this species is between 5000 – 20,000 square kilometers, which is relatively small. E. barrenense is not thought to have either spread or shrunk its distribution since it was described in 1982, but very little data are available on its dispersal and other movements; some larvae may drift along with the current, but ultimately, the species has remained in its small range. The splendid darter has a tendency to spend most of its life in deep, rocky pools and the riffles of small creeks and rivers, as well as streams.

The geographic distribution of E. barrenense and other darter species is extremely important to the way the species passes on its genes to subsequent generations. Much of the isolation that remains between closely related species of darters is due to brilliant nuptial coloring and behavioral isolation, ensuring that mates of the same species are attracted to one another. Since many of these species live in sympatric populations, there must be a mechanism such as this, allowing the genes of different species to remain isolated. Without the occurrence of this phenomenon, the very genes which define the species could be compromised, endangering its existence.

== Ecology ==
The splendid darter is a benthopelagic fish that occupies a freshwater habitat. Research has not yet revealed the specific dieting habits, competitors, or predators of this darter, but studies of other darter species indicate the splendid darter is likely insectivorous and at times consumed by larger predatory fish. These invertivorous fish spend most of their time feeding on the bottoms and sides of streams.

== Life history ==
E. barrenense reaches sexual maturity around one year of age, but the majority of breeding individuals sampled are between two and three years old. Typical mating pairs include a two-year-old female and a three-year-old male. Breeding occurs once a year, normally from March to June in Kentucky and March to May in Tennessee. The average lifespan of this species is only three years, so most individuals may breed once or twice before they die. No individuals have been known to live beyond three years.

Most species of Etheostoma exhibit unique nuptial coloration and E. barrenense is no exception. It Reproductive isolation and sexual selection between species is thought to maintain these diverse color patterns, as these fish are often found in sympatric populations. Breeding is an interesting phenomenon; males establish floating territories in deep pools and females approach these microhabitats where both fish will press against inclined stones to lay their eggs. Many eggs are laid at one time, but they are usually produced individually on separate, vertical rocks in slightly flowing currents. This dispersing of the eggs increases the chance of survival for at least a few of the offspring. The eggs are spherical, translucent, and adhesive, providing them a greater opportunity to survive as they are attached to a vertical wall and often difficult to detect.

== Management ==
On a conservation level, Etheostoma barrenense is considered secure using the NatureServe conservation status both nationally and globally, but vulnerable on a state scale in Tennessee. However, the International Union for the Conservation of Nature has not evaluated the conservation status of this species, so some debate exists surrounding just how threatened it may be. We have just cause to assume that for now, the species is stable. However, increasing anthropogenic change in the area may be leading to the future detriment of not only the splendid darter, but other wildlife inhabiting this small ecosystem in the southeastern United States. E. barrenense is considered a species that warrants protection in Tennessee, but not throughout its range.

Geographic extent, habitat specificity (the number of habitat types in which a species is known to exist), and local population size are good criteria to use as a basis for species rarity, and according to these three dimensions, the splendid darter is extremely rare. This characteristic alone is enough to warrant protection of the species, yet no management practices are in place specific to the conservation of the splendid darter.

In addition to its rarity, several other factors have the potential to contribute to a decline in splendid darter abundance. These include, but are not limited to, hybridization with closely related species, habitat destruction or modification, and the threat of invasive species. An estimated 10,000 individuals of E. barrenense exist across its native range in Kentucky and Tennessee.
