= Etheostoma nebra =

Conservation status
- Critically Imperiled (NatureServe)

Scientific classification
- Kingdom: Animalia
- Phylum: Chordata
- Class: Actinopterygii
- Order: Perciformes
- Family: Percidae
- Genus: Etheostoma
- Species: E. nebra

Binomial name
- Etheostoma nebra Near & Thomas, 2015

Species of fish

Etheostoma nebra is a species of freshwater ray-finned fish, classified as a darter within the subfamily Etheostomatinae of the family Percidae, which also includes perches, ruffes and pikeperches. this species is endemic to the eastern United States, where it is restricted to the Buck Creek system of the Cumberland River drainage in Kentucky. due to its restricted geographic range and the loss of populations within the Buck Creek system since the 1980s, Etheostoma nebra is likely to be critically imperiled.
