= Sunburst darter =

Conservation status
- Least Concern (IUCN 3.1)

Scientific classification
- Kingdom: Animalia
- Phylum: Chordata
- Class: Actinopterygii
- Order: Perciformes
- Family: Percidae
- Genus: Etheostoma
- Species: E. mihileze

Binomial name
- Etheostoma mihileze Mayden, 2010

Species of fish

The sunburst darter (Etheostoma mihileze) is a species of freshwater ray-finned fish, a darter from the subfamily Etheostomatinae, part of the family Percidae, which also contains the perches, ruffes and pikeperches. It is found in the Arkansas River drainage in southeastern Kansas, southwestern Missouri, northeastern Oklahoma, and northwestern Arkansas. It inhabits small, clear, cool streams and creeks with a clean gravel and/or cobble substrate.
