= Striped darter =

Conservation status
- Least Concern (IUCN 3.1)

Scientific classification
- Kingdom: Animalia
- Phylum: Chordata
- Class: Actinopterygii
- Order: Perciformes
- Family: Percidae
- Genus: Etheostoma
- Species: E. virgatum

Binomial name
- Etheostoma virgatum (D. S. Jordan, 1880)

Synonyms
- Poecilichthys virgatus Jordan, 1880

Species of fish

The striped darter (Etheostoma virgatum) is a species of freshwater ray-finned fish, a darter from the subfamily Etheostomatinae, part of the family Percidae, which also contains the perches, ruffes and pikeperches. It is found in the lower Cumberland River drainage (Stones River to Red River) in Kentucky and Tennessee, in the upper Caney Fork system in central Tennessee; and in Rockcastle River and nearby streams in eastern Kentucky. It inhabits rocky pools of headwaters, creeks and small to medium river. This species can reach a length of 7.8 cm (3.1 in), though most only reach about 4.8 cm (1.9 in).
