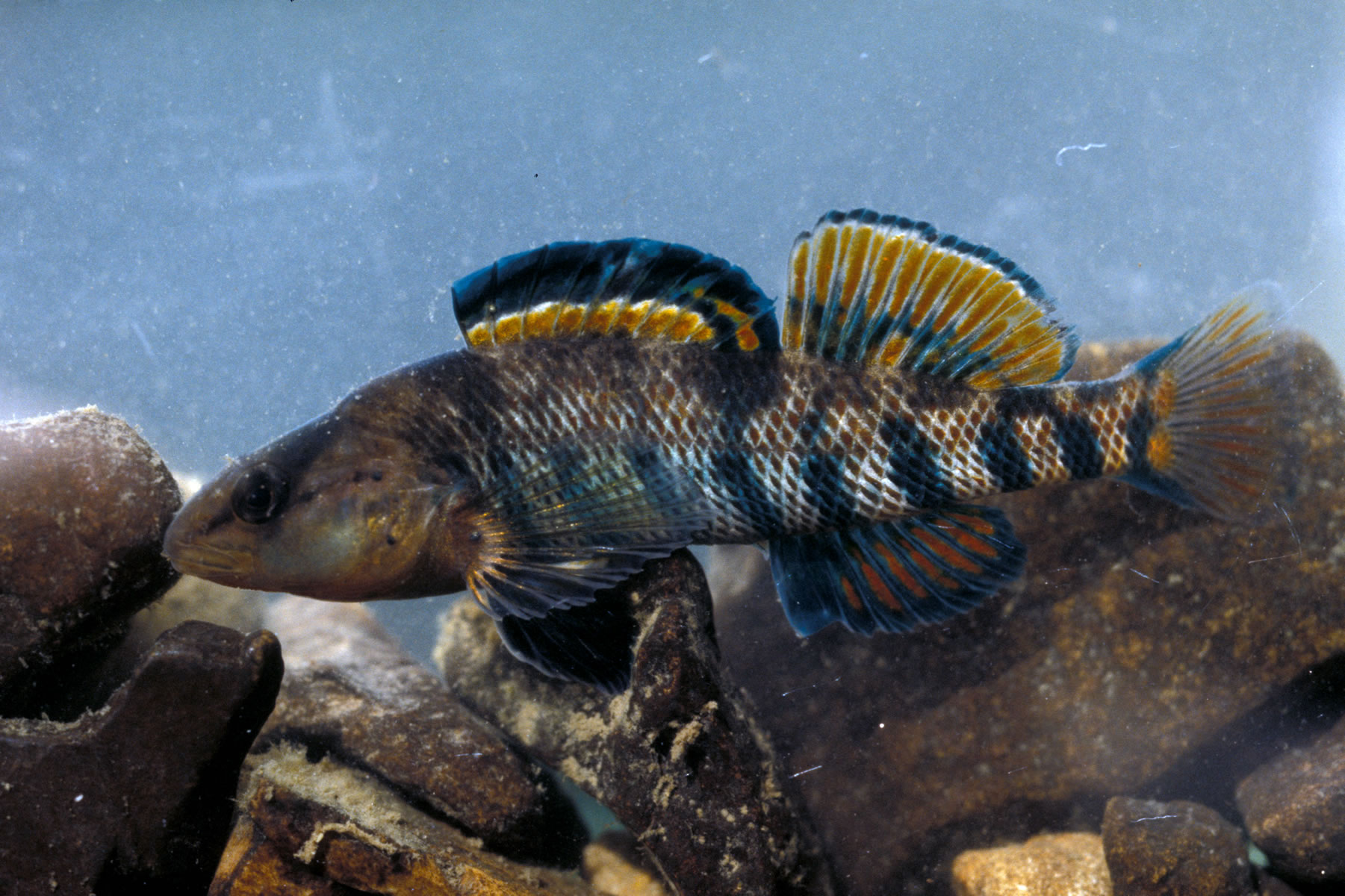
- Etheostoma caeruleum
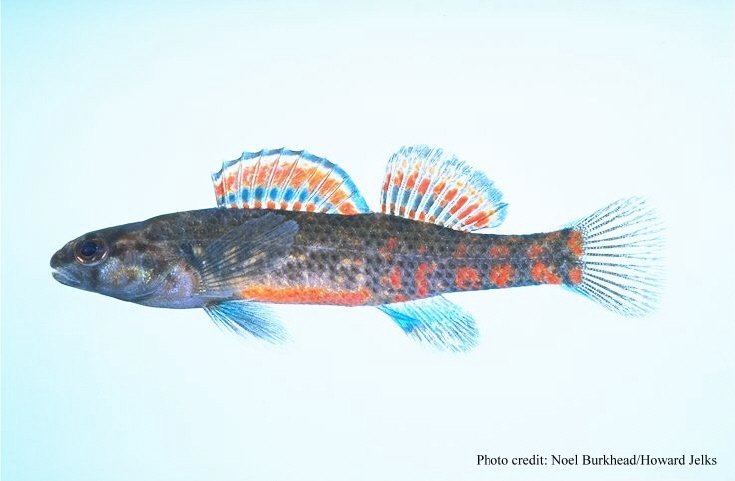
- Etheostoma swaini

Scientific classification
- Kingdom: Animalia
- Phylum: Chordata
- Class: Actinopterygii
- Division: Teleostei
- Order: Perciformes
- Family: Percidae
- Subfamily: Etheostomatinae
- Genus: Etheostoma; Rafinesque, 1819

Type species
- Etheostoma blennioides Rafinesque, 1819

Synonyms
- List: Arlina Girard, 1859; Astatichthys Vaillant, 1873; Austroperca C. L. Hubbs, 1936; Claricola D.S. Jordan & Evermann, 1896; Copelandellus D.S. Jordan & Evermann, 1896; Diplesion Rafinesque, 1820; Estrella Girard, 1859; Hyostoma Agassiz, 1854; Nanostoma Putnam, 1877; Nivicola D.S. Jordan & Evermann, 1896; Niviperca Whitley, 1951; Oopareia Near & Keck in Near et al., 2011; Poecilosoma Agassiz, 1850; Rafinesquiellus D.S. Jordan & Evermann, 1896; Rhothoeca D.S. Jordan, 1885; Richia Coker, 1926; Richiella Coker, 1927; Torrentaria D.S. Jordan & Evermann, 1896

= Etheostoma =

Genus of fishes

Etheostoma is a genus of small freshwater fish in the family Percidae, and within the subfamily Etheostomatinae, native to North America. Most are restricted to the United States, but species are also found in Canada and Mexico. They are commonly known as darters, although the term "darter" is shared by several other genera. Many can produce alarm pheromones that serve to warn nearby fish in case of an attack.

== Species ==
The 146 recognized species in this genus are arranged into 18 subgenera. Two former subgenera, Allohistium and Nothonotus have been promoted to full genera.

- Subgenus Belophlox Fowler, 1947
  - Etheostoma fricksium Hildebrand, 1923 (savannah darter)
  - Etheostoma mariae (Fowler, 1947) (pinewoods darter)
  - Etheostoma okaloosae (Fowler, 1941) (Okaloosa darter)
- Subgenus Boleosoma DeKay, 1842
  - Etheostoma longimanum D. S. Jordan, 1888 (longfin darter)
  - Etheostoma maculaticeps (E. D. Cope, 1870)
  - Etheostoma nigrum Rafinesque, 1820 (johnny darter)
  - Etheostoma olmstedi D. H. Storer, 1842 (tessellated darter)
  - Etheostoma perlongum C. L. Hubbs & Raney, 1946) (Waccamaw darter)
  - Etheostoma podostemone D. S. Jordan & O. P. Jenkins, 1889 (riverweed darter)
  - Etheostoma susanae (D. S. Jordan & Swain, 1883) (Cumberland darter)
  - Etheostoma vexillare (D. S. Jordan, 1880)
- Subgenus Catonotus Agassiz, 1854
  - Etheostoma barbouri Kuehne & J. W. Small, 1971 (teardrop darter)
  - Etheostoma basilare Page, Hardman & Near, 2003 (corrugated darter)
  - Etheostoma brevispinum (Coker, 1926) (Carolina fantail darter)
  - Etheostoma chienense Page & Ceas, 1992 (relict darter)
  - Etheostoma corona Page & Ceas, 1992 (crown darter)
  - Etheostoma crossopterum Braasch & Mayden, 1985 (fringed darter)
  - Etheostoma cumberlandicum D. S. Jordan & Swain, 1883
  - Etheostoma derivativum Page, Hardman & Near, 2003 (stone darter)
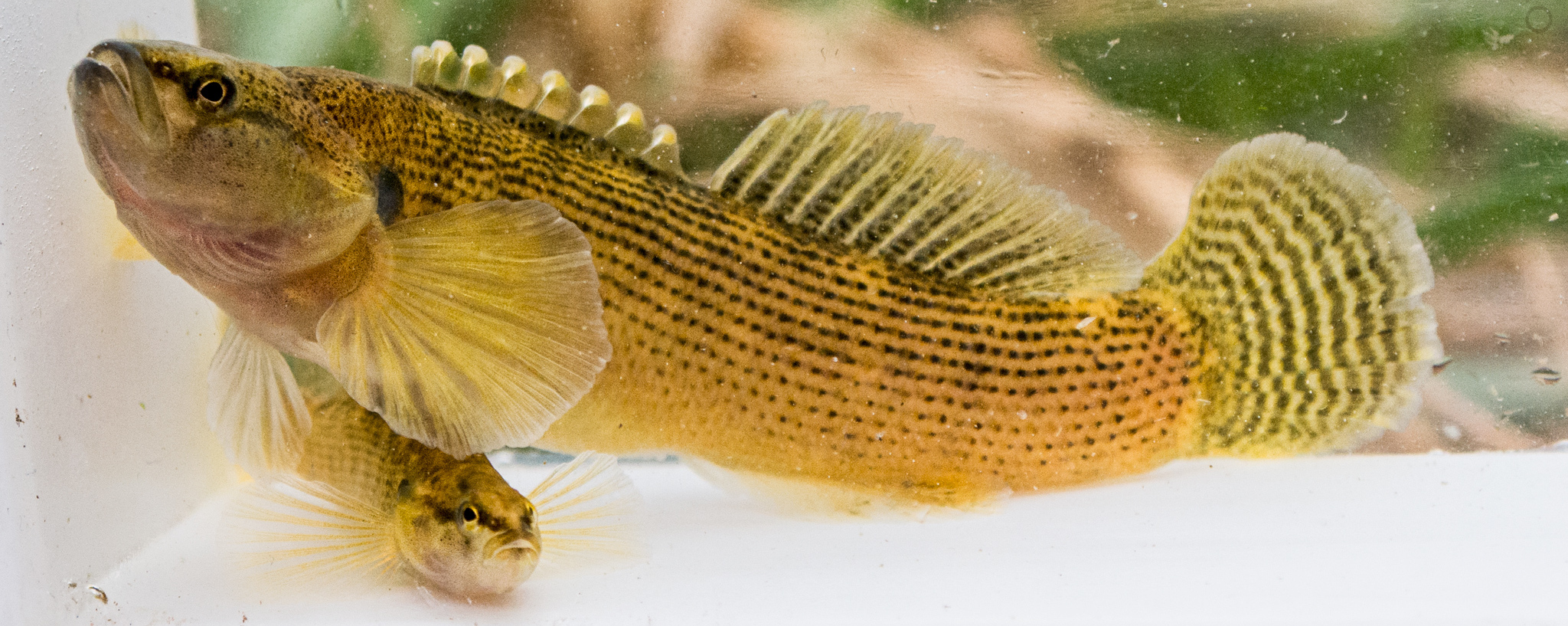
  - E. flabellare
    Etheostoma flabellare Rafinesque, 1819 (fantail darter)
  - Etheostoma forbesi Page & Ceas, 1992 (barrens darter)
  - Etheostoma kennicotti (Putnam, 1863) (stripetail darter)
  - Etheostoma lemniscatum Blanton, 2008 (tuxedo darter)
  - Etheostoma marmorpinnum Blanton & R. E. Jenkins, 2008 (marbled darter)
  - Etheostoma nebra Near & M. R. Thomas, 2015 (buck darter)
  - Etheostoma neopterum W. M. Howell & Dingerkus, 1978 (lollipop darter)
  - Etheostoma nigripinne Braasch & Mayden, 1985 (blackfin darter)
  - Etheostoma obeyense Kirsch, 1892 (barcheek darter)
  - Etheostoma olivaceum Braasch & Page, 1979 (sooty darter)
  - Etheostoma oophylax Ceas & Page, 1992 (guardian darter)
  - Etheostoma percnurum R. E. Jenkins, 1994 (duskytail darter)
  - Etheostoma pseudovulatum Page & Ceas, 1992 (egg-mimic darter)
  - Etheostoma sitikuense Blanton, 2008 (Citico darter)
  - Etheostoma smithi Page & Braasch, 1976 (slabrock darter)
  - Etheostoma squamiceps D. S. Jordan, 1877 (spottail darter)
  - Etheostoma striatulum Page & Braasch, 1977 (striated darter)
  - Etheostoma virgatum (D. S. Jordan, 1880) (striped darter)
  - Etheostoma xanthovum Wood & Near, 2023
- Subgenus Doration D.S. Jordan, 1929
  - Etheostoma akatulo Layman & Mayden, 2009 (bluemask darter)
  - Etheostoma clinton Mayden & Layman, 2012 (beaded darter)
  - Etheostoma gore Mayden & Layman, 2012 (Cumberland darter)
  - Etheostoma jessiae (D. S. Jordan & Brayton, 1878) (blueside darter)
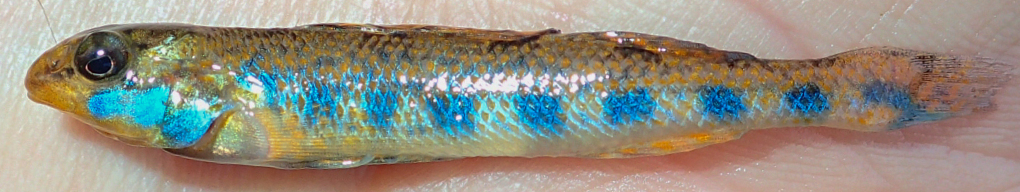
  - E. jimmycarteri
    Etheostoma jimmycarter Mayden & Layman, 2012 (bluegrass darter)
  - Etheostoma meadiae (D. S. Jordan & B. W. Evermann, 1898)
  - Etheostoma obama Mayden & Layman, 2012 (spangled darter)
  - Etheostoma stigmaeum (D. S. Jordan, 1877) (speckled darter)
  - Etheostoma teddyroosevelt Mayden & Layman, 2012 (highland darter)
- Subgenus Etheostoma
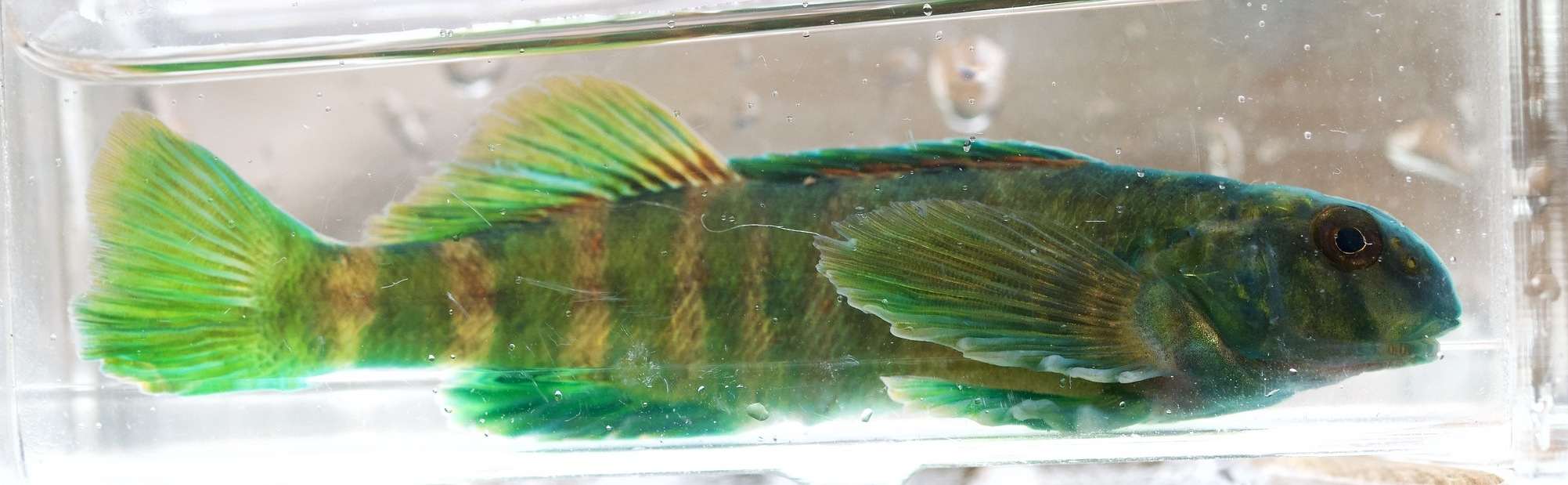
  - E. blennioides
    Etheostoma blennioides Rafinesque, 1819 (greenside darter)
  - Etheostoma blennius C. H. Gilbert & Swain, 1887 (blenny darter)
  - Etheostoma gutselli (Hildebrand, 1932) (Tuckasegee darter)
  - Etheostoma histrio D. S. Jordan & C. H. Gilbert, 1887 (harlequin darter)
  - Etheostoma inscriptum (D. S. Jordan & Brayton, 1878) (turquoise darter)
  - Etheostoma lynceum O. P. Hay, 1885 (brighteye darter)
  - Etheostoma rupestre C. H. Gilbert & Swain, 1887 (rock darter)
  - Etheostoma swannanoa D. S. Jordan & Evermann, 1889 (Swannanoa darter)
  - Etheostoma sequatchiense Burr, 1979 (Sequatchie darter)
  - Etheostoma thalassinum (D. S. Jordan & Brayton, 1878) (seagreen darter)
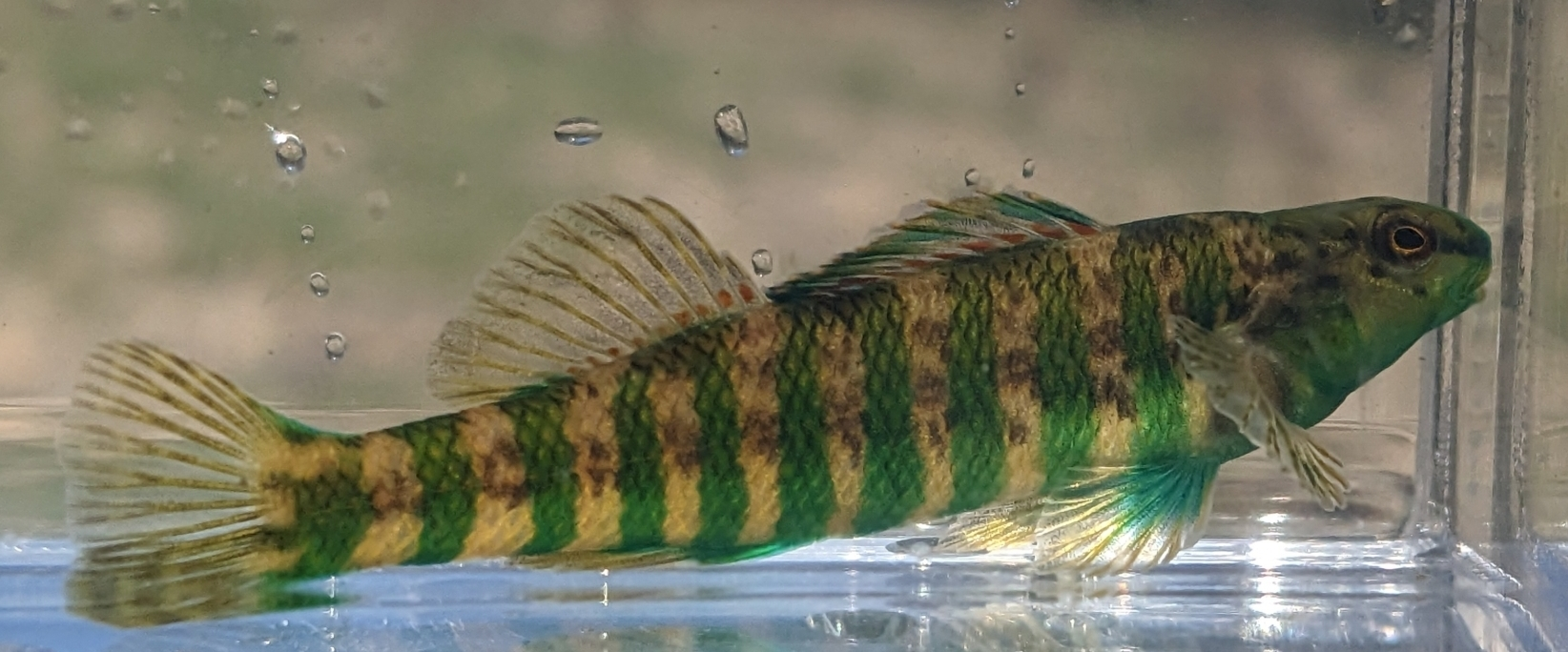
  - E. zonale
    Etheostoma zonale (Cope, 1868) (banded darter)
- Subgenus Fuscatelum Page, 1981
  - Etheostoma parvipinne C. H. Gilbert & Swain, 1887 (goldstripe darter)
  - Etheostoma phytophilum Bart & M. S. Taylor, 1999 (rush darter)
- Subgenus Hololepis Putnam, 1863
  - Etheostoma collis (C. L. Hubbs & Cannon, 1935) (Carolina darter)
  - Etheostoma fusiforme (Girard, 1854) (swamp darter)
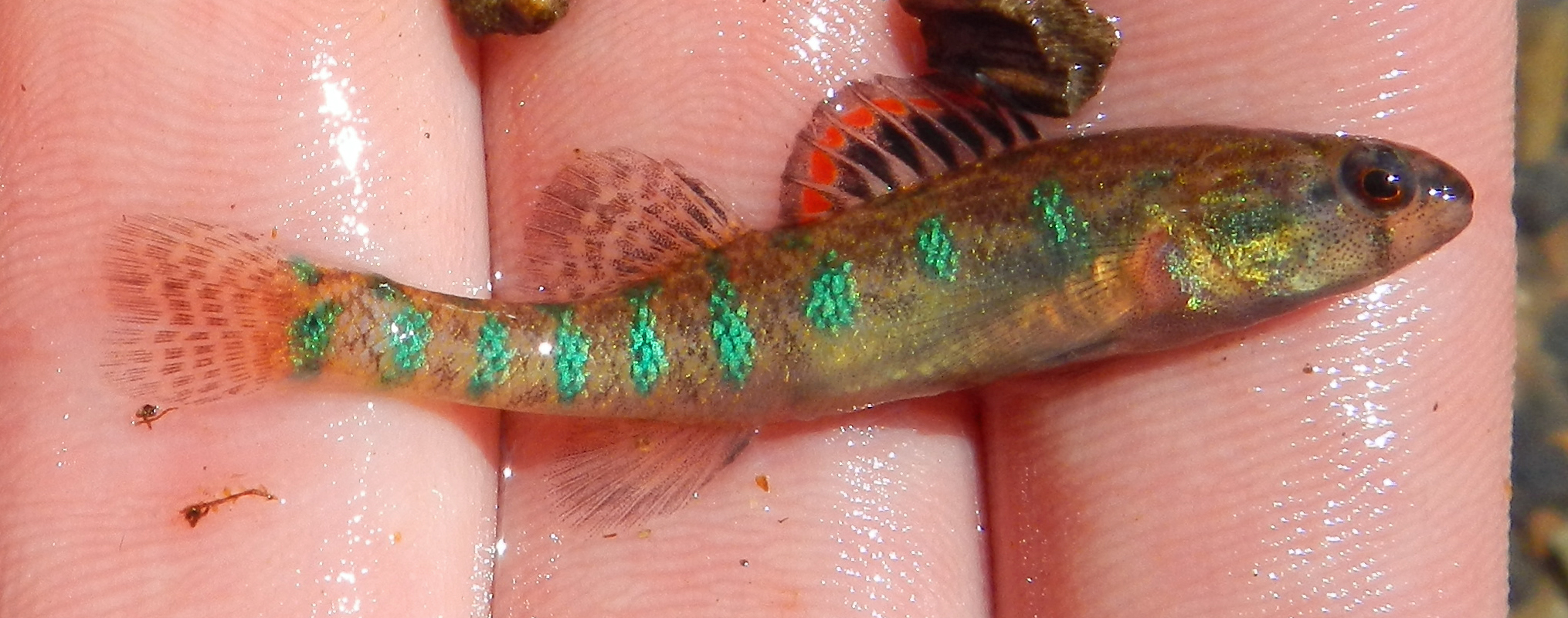
  - E. gracile
    Etheostoma gracile (Girard, 1859) (slough darter)
  - Etheostoma serrifer (C. L. Hubbs & Cannon, 1935) (sawcheek darter)
  - Etheostoma zonifer C. L. Hubbs & Cannon, 1935) (backwater darter)
- Subgenus Ioa D.S. Jordan & Brayton, 1878
  - Etheostoma vitreum (Cope, 1870) (glassy darter)
- Subgenus Litocara R.M. Bailey, 1948
  - Etheostoma nianguae C. H. Gilbert & Meek, 1887 (Niangua darter)
  - Etheostoma sagitta (D. S. Jordan & Swain, 1883) (arrow darter)
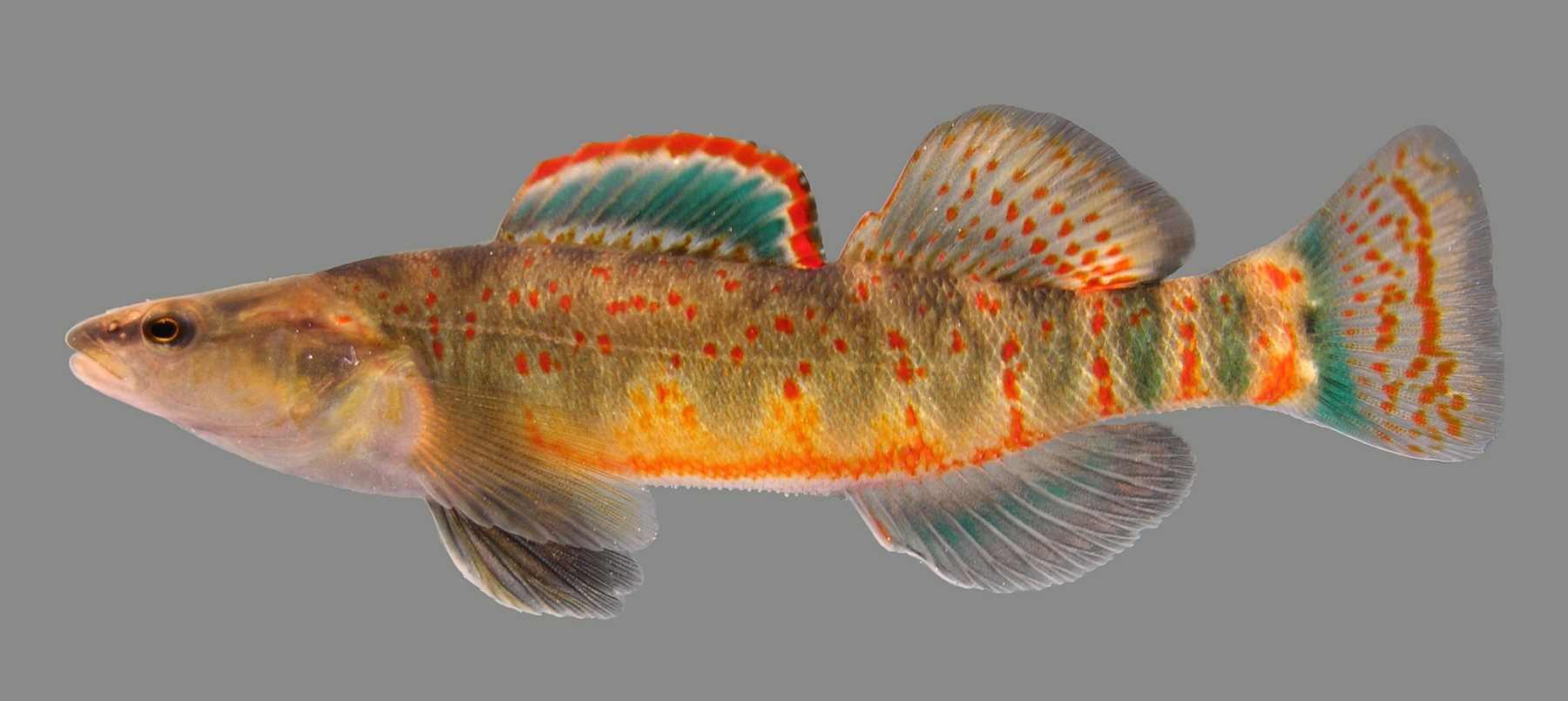
  - E. spilotum
    Etheostoma spilotum C. H. Gilbert, 1887 (Kentucky arrow darter, Cumberland Plateau darter)
- Subgenus Microperca Putnam, 1863
  - Etheostoma fonticola (D. S. Jordan & C. H. Gilbert, 1886) (fountain darter)
  - Etheostoma microperca D. S. Jordan & C. H. Gilbert, 1888 (least darter)
  - Etheostoma proeliare (O. P. Hay, 1881) (cypress darter)
- Subgenus Mooreichthys R.R. Stephens, K.A. Johnson & M.P. Grady, 2014
  - Etheostoma sellare (Radcliffe & W. W. Welsh, 1913) (Maryland darter)
- Subgenus Oligocephalus Girard, 1859
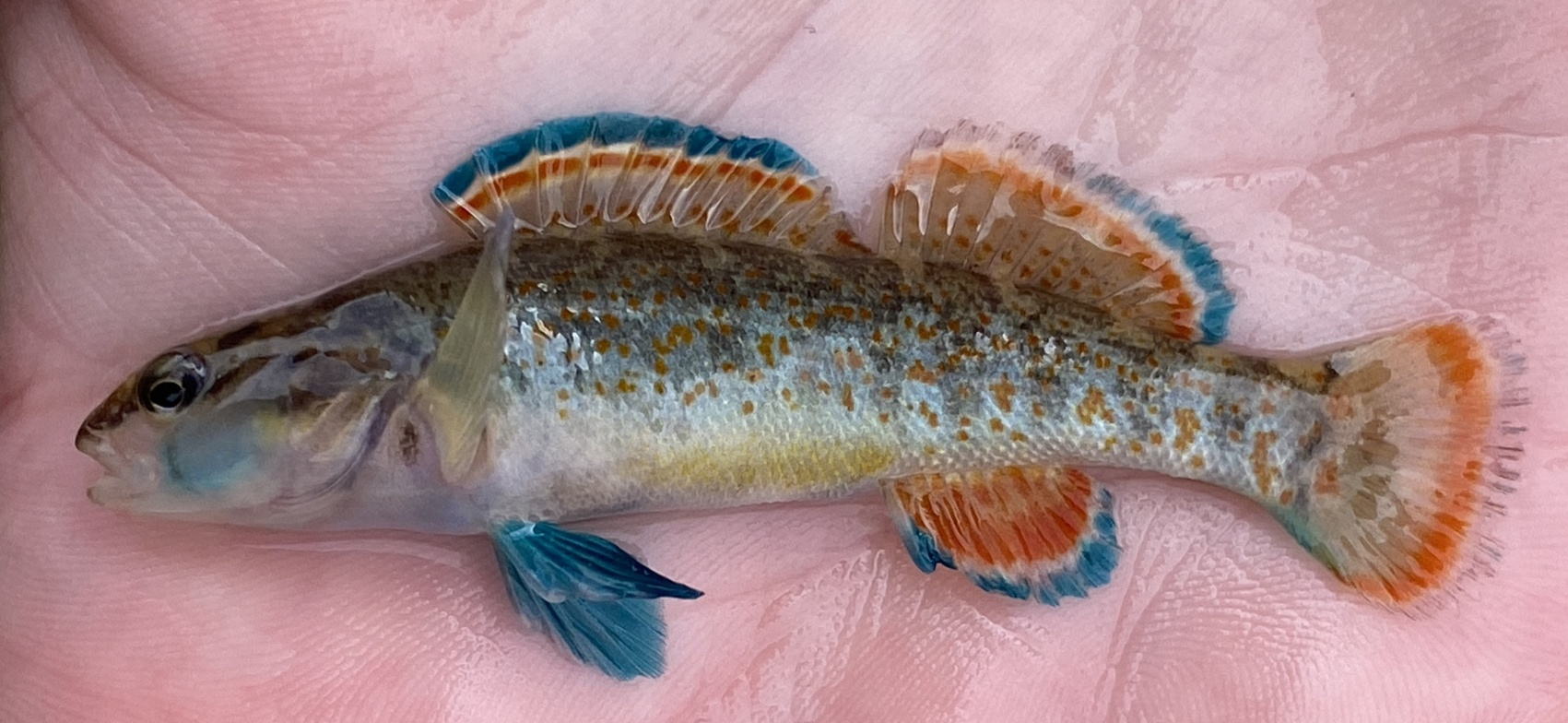
  - E. artesiae
    Etheostoma artesiae (O. P. Hay, 1881) (redspot darter)
  - Etheostoma asprigene (S. A. Forbes, 1878) (mud darter)
  - Etheostoma australe D. S. Jordan, 1889 (Conchos darter)
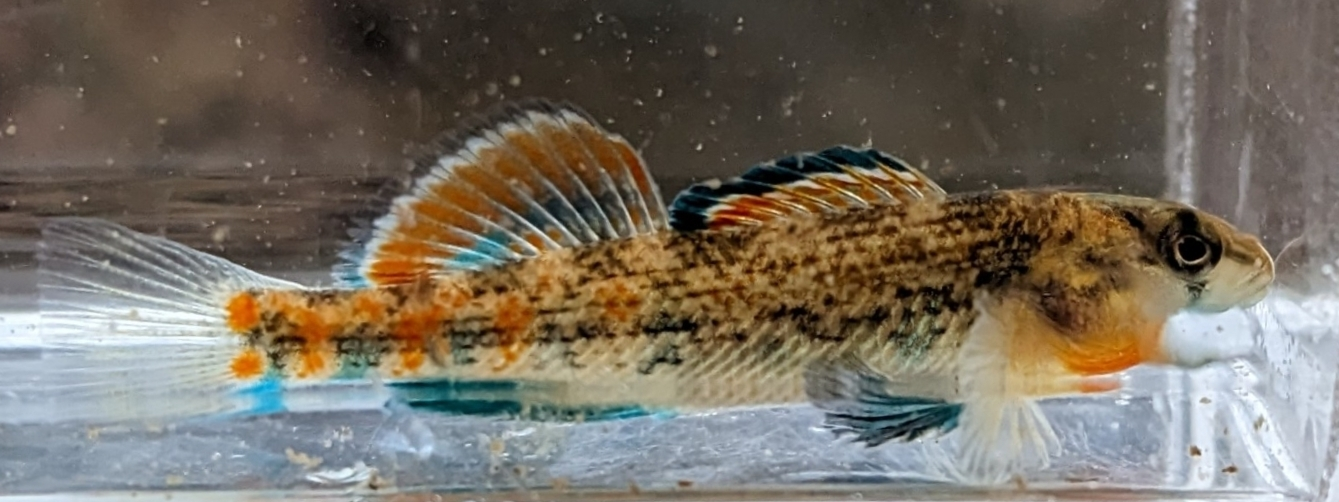
  - E. bison
    Etheostoma bison Ceas & Page, 1997 (buffalo darter)
  - Etheostoma burri Ceas & Page, 1997 (brook darter)
  - Etheostoma caeruleum D. H. Storer, 1845 (rainbow darter)
  - Etheostoma collettei Birdsong & L. W. Knapp, 1969 (creole darter)
  - Etheostoma cyanorum (Moore & Rigney, 1952)
  - Etheostoma ditrema Ramsey & Suttkus, 1965 (coldwater darter)
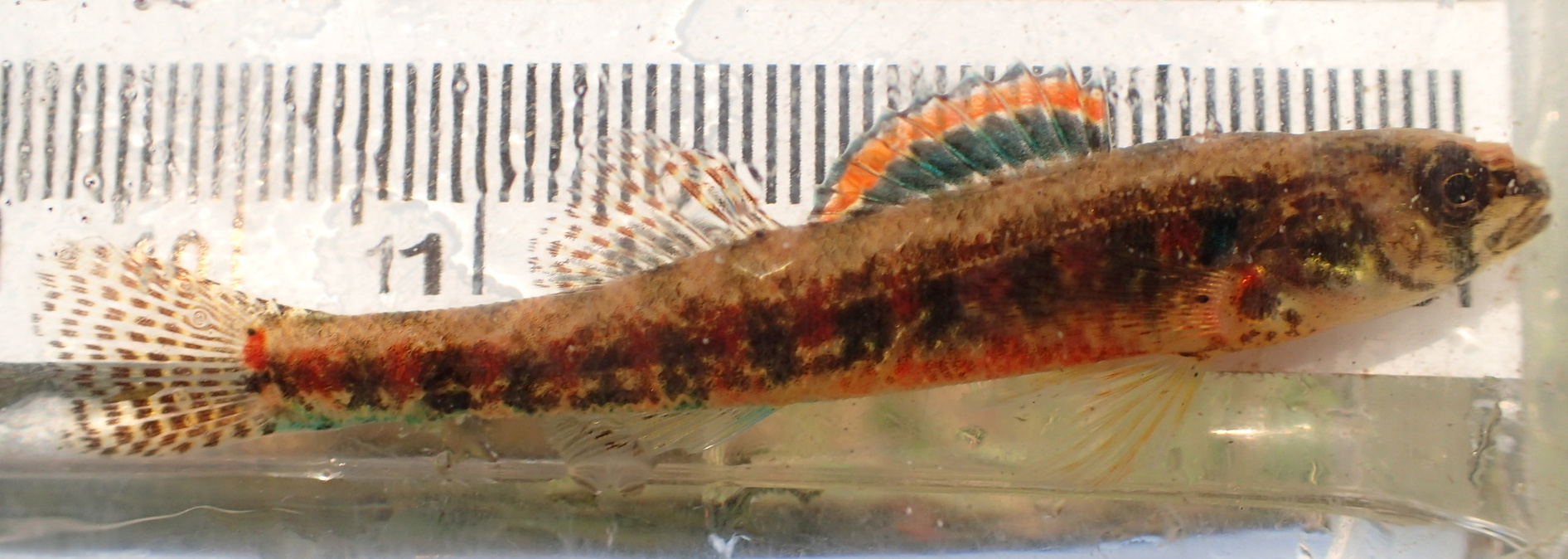
  - E. exile
    Etheostoma exile (Girard, 1859) (Iowa darter)
  - Etheostoma fragi Distler, 1968 (strawberry darter)
  - Etheostoma grahami (Girard, 1859) (Rio Grande darter)
  - Etheostoma hopkinsi (Fowler, 1945) (Christmas darter)
  - Etheostoma kantuckeense Ceas & Page, 1997 (Highland Rim darter)
  - Etheostoma lawrencei Ceas & Burr, 2002 (headwater darter)
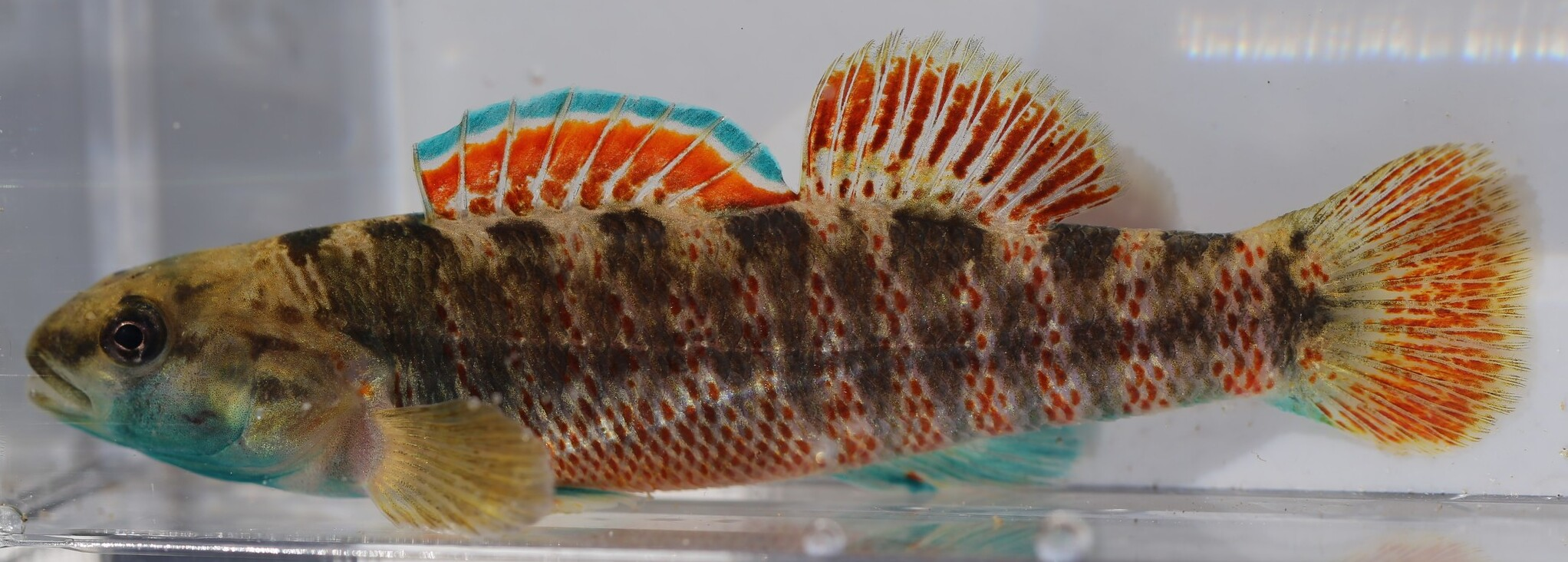
  - E. lepidum
    Etheostoma lepidum (S. F. Baird & Girard, 1853) (greenthroat darter)
  - Etheostoma lugoi S. M. Norris & W. L. Minckley, 1997 (tufa darter)
  - Etheostoma luteovinctum C. H. Gilbert & Swain, 1887 (redband darter)
  - Etheostoma nuchale W. M. Howell & R. D. Caldwell, 1965 (watercress darter)
  - Etheostoma pottsii (Girard, 1859) (Chihuahua darter)
  - Etheostoma radiosum (C. L. Hubbs & J. D. Black, 1941) (orangebelly darter)
  - Etheostoma segrex S. M. Norris & W. L. Minckley, 1997 (Río Salado darter)
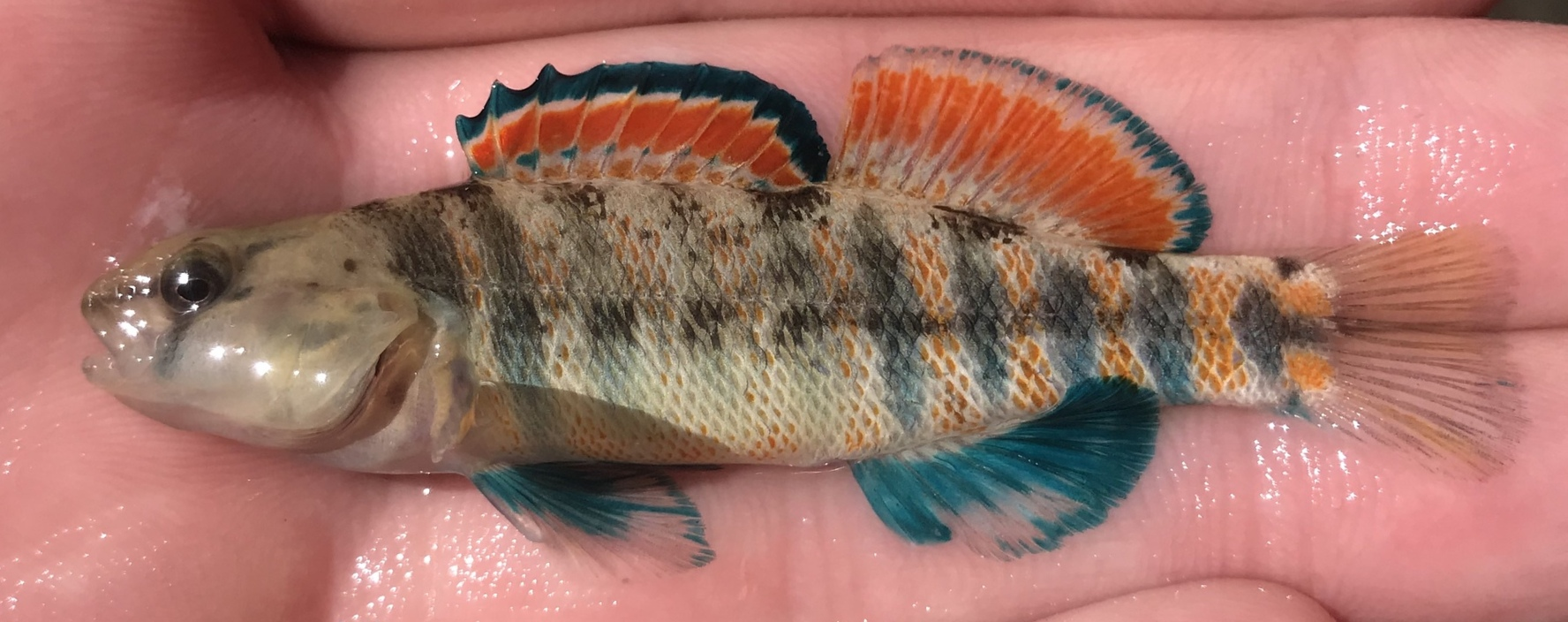
  - E. spectabile pulchellum
    Etheostoma spectabile (Agassiz, 1854) (orangethroat darter)
  - Etheostoma swaini (D. S. Jordan, 1884) (Gulf darter)
  - Etheostoma tecumsehi Ceas & Page, 1997 (Shawnee darter)
  - Etheostoma thompsoni Suttkus, Bart & Etnier, 2012 (gumbo darter)
  - Etheostoma uniporum Distler, 1968 (current darter)
  - Etheostoma whipplei (Girard, 1859) (redfin darter)
- Subgenus Ozarka J.D. Williams & Robison, 1981
  - Etheostoma autumnale Mayden, 2010 (autumn darter)
  - Etheostoma boschungi Wall & J. D. Williams, 1974 (slackwater darter)
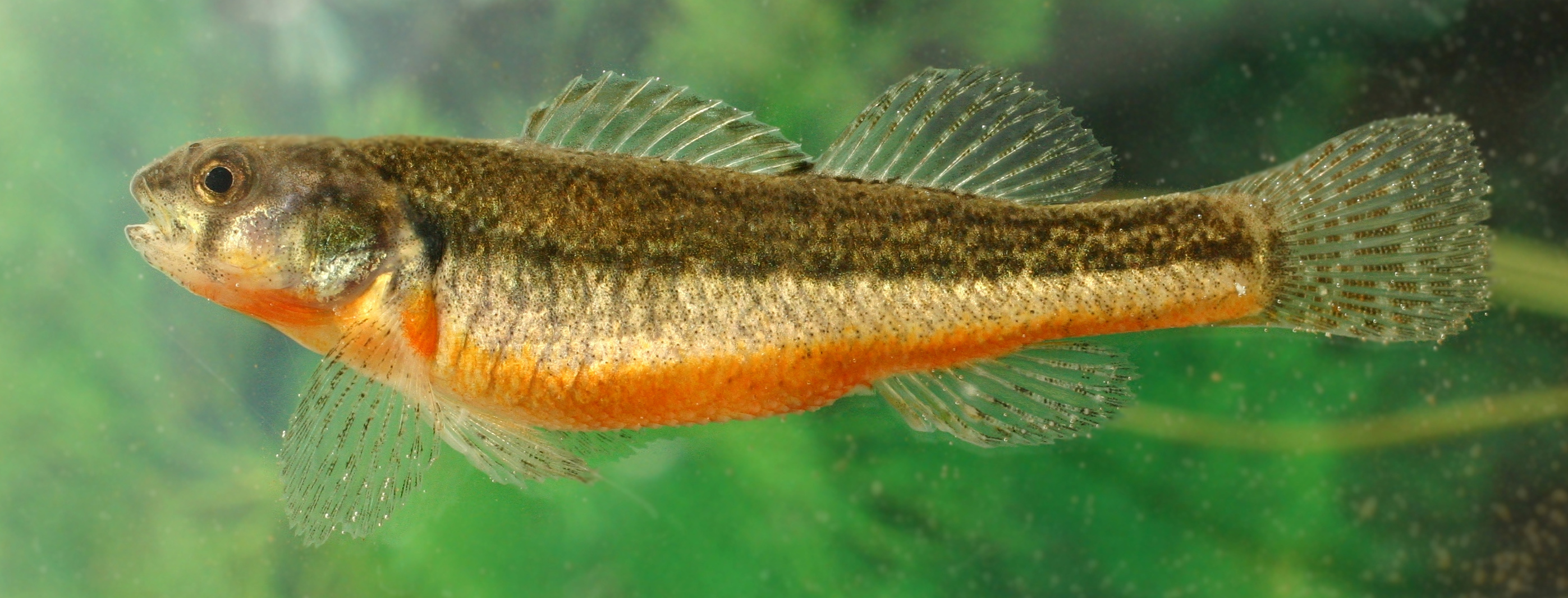
  - E. cragini
    Etheostoma cragini C. H. Gilbert, 1885 (Arkansas darter)
  - Etheostoma mihileze Mayden, 2010 (sunburst darter)
  - Etheostoma pallididorsum Distler & Metcalf, 1962 (paleback darter)
  - Etheostoma punctulatum (Agassiz, 1854) (stippled darter)
  - Etheostoma trisella R. M. Bailey & W. J. Richards, 1963 (trispot darter)
- Subgenus Poecilichthys Agassiz, 1854
  - Etheostoma erythrozonum Switzer & R. M. Wood, 2009 (Meramec saddled darter)
  - Etheostoma euzonum (C. L. Hubbs & J. D. Black, 1940) (Arkansas saddled darter)
  - Etheostoma kanawhae (Raney, 1941) (Kanawha darter)
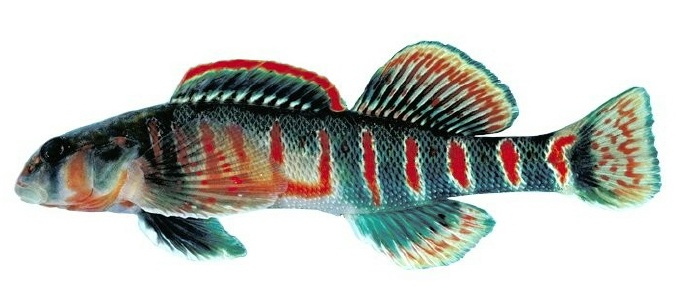
  - E. osburni
    Etheostoma osburni (C. L. Hubbs & Trautman, 1932) (candy darter)
  - Etheostoma tetrazonum (C. L. Hubbs & J. D. Black, 1940) (Missouri saddled darter)
  - Etheostoma variatum Kirtland, 1838 (variegated darter)
- Subgenus Psychromaster D.S. Jordan & Evermann, 1896
  - Etheostoma tuscumbia C. H. Gilbert & Swain, 1887 (Tuscumbia darter)
- Subgenus Ulocentra D.S. Jordan, 1878 “Snubnose darters”
  - Etheostoma atripinne (D. S. Jordan, 1877) (Cumberland snubnose darter)
  - Etheostoma baileyi Page & Burr, 1982 (emerald darter)
  - Etheostoma barrenense Burr & Page, 1982 (splendid darter)
  - Etheostoma bellator Suttkus & R. M. Bailey, 1993 (warrior darter)
  - Etheostoma birminghamense Brownstein, Kim, Wood, Alley, Stokes & Near, 2025
  - Etheostoma brevirostrum Suttkus & Etnier, 1991 (holiday darter)
  - Etheostoma cervus Powers & Mayden, 2003 (Chickasaw darter)
  - Etheostoma chermocki Boschung, Mayden & Tomelleri, 1992 (vermilion darter)
  - Etheostoma colorosum Suttkus & R. M. Bailey, 1993 (coastal darter)
  - Etheostoma coosae (Fowler, 1945) (Coosa darter)
  - Etheostoma cyanoprosopum Near & Kozal, 2017 (blueface darter)
  - Etheostoma duryi Henshall, 1889 (black darter)
  - Etheostoma etnieri Bouchard, 1977 (cherry darter)
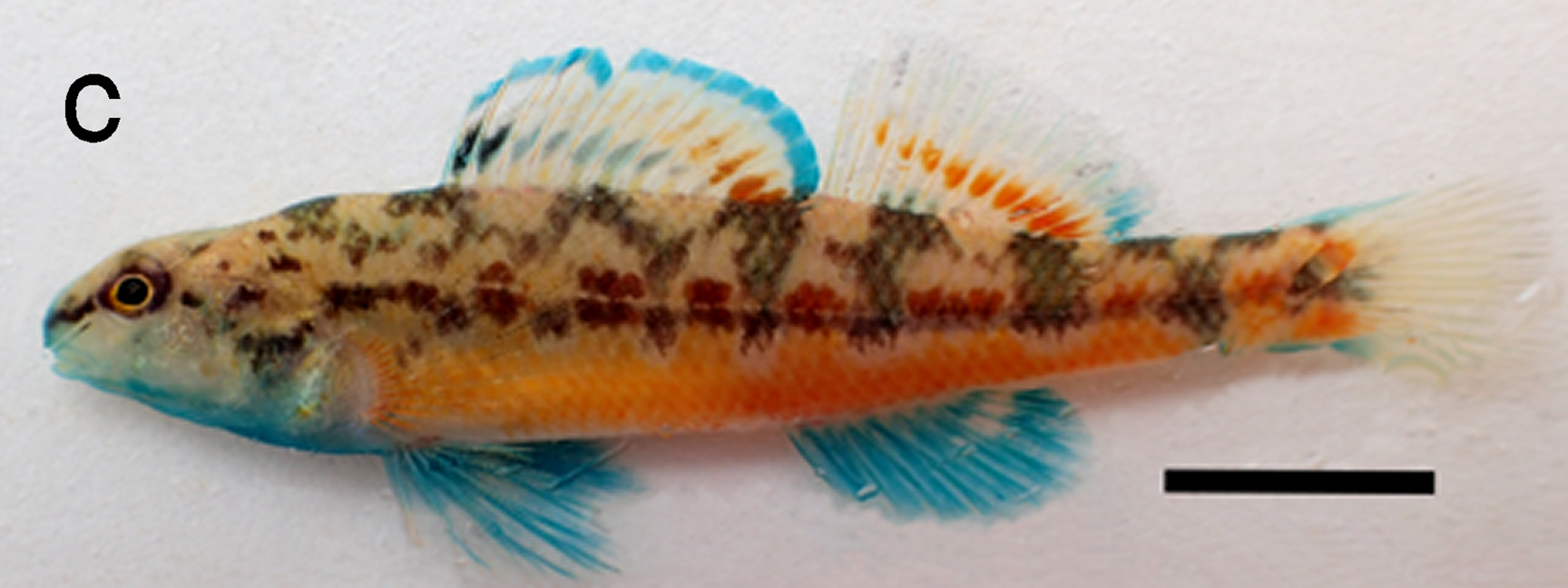
  - E. faulkneri
    Etheostoma faulkneri Sterling & Warren, 2020 (Yoknapatawpha darter)
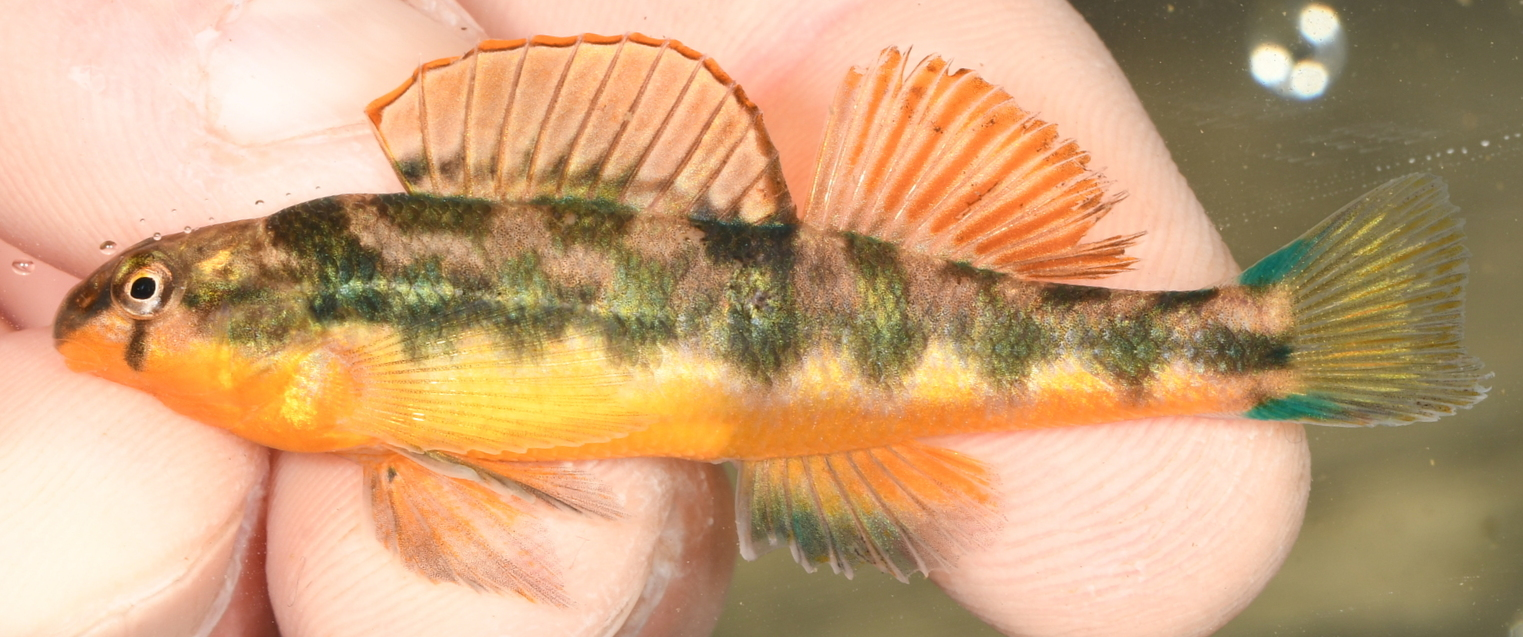
  - E. flavum
    Etheostoma flavum Etnier & R. M. Bailey, 1989 (saffron darter)
  - Etheostoma gurleyense Brownstein, Kim, Wood, Alley, Stokes & Near, 2025
  - Etheostoma kimberlae Mayden, 2025
  - Etheostoma lachneri Suttkus & R. M. Bailey, 1994 (Tombigbee darter)
  - Etheostoma michellae Mayden, 2025
  - Etheostoma orientale Powers & Mayden, 2007 (East Rim darter)
  - Etheostoma planasaxatile Powers & Mayden, 2007 (duck darter)
  - Etheostoma pyrrhogaster R. M. Bailey & Etnier, 1988 (firebelly darter)
  - Etheostoma rafinesquei Burr & Page, 1982 (Kentucky darter)
  - Etheostoma ramseyi Suttkus & R. M. Bailey, 1994 (Alabama darter)
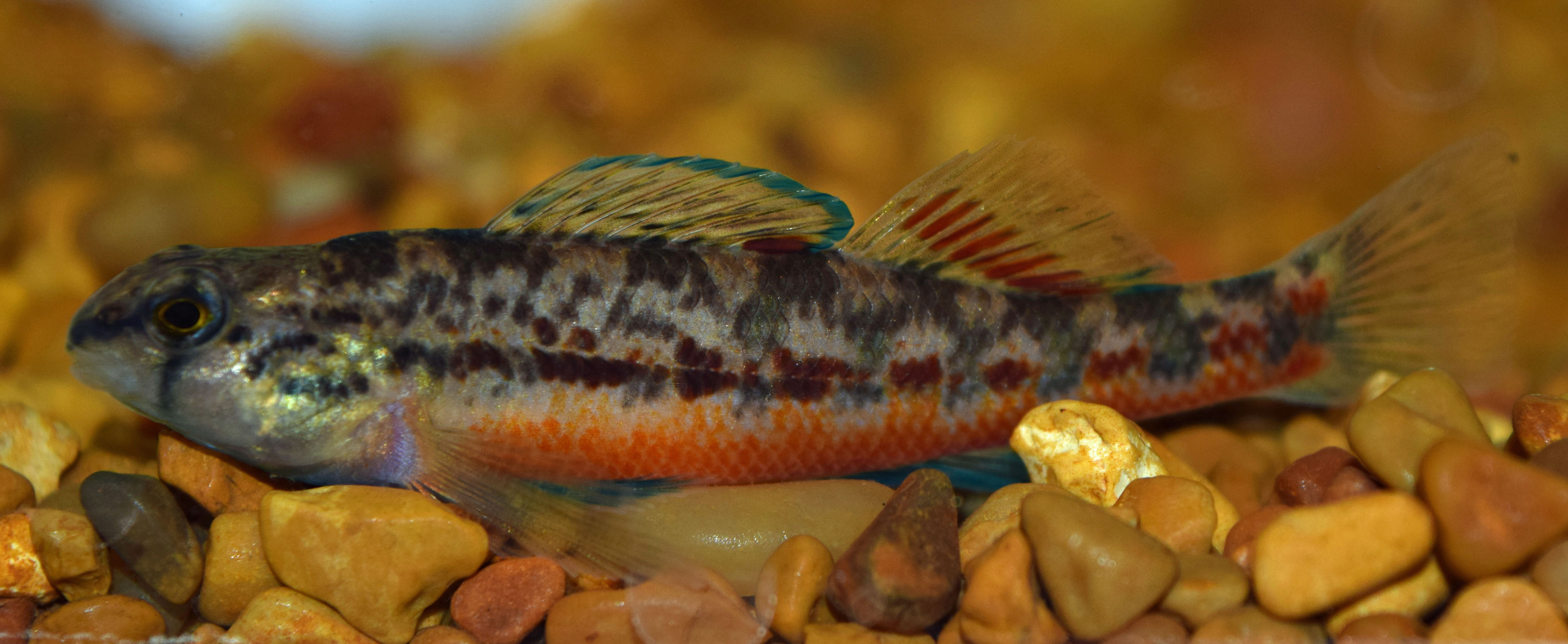
  - E. raneyi
    Etheostoma raneyi Suttkus & Bart, 1994 (Yazoo darter)
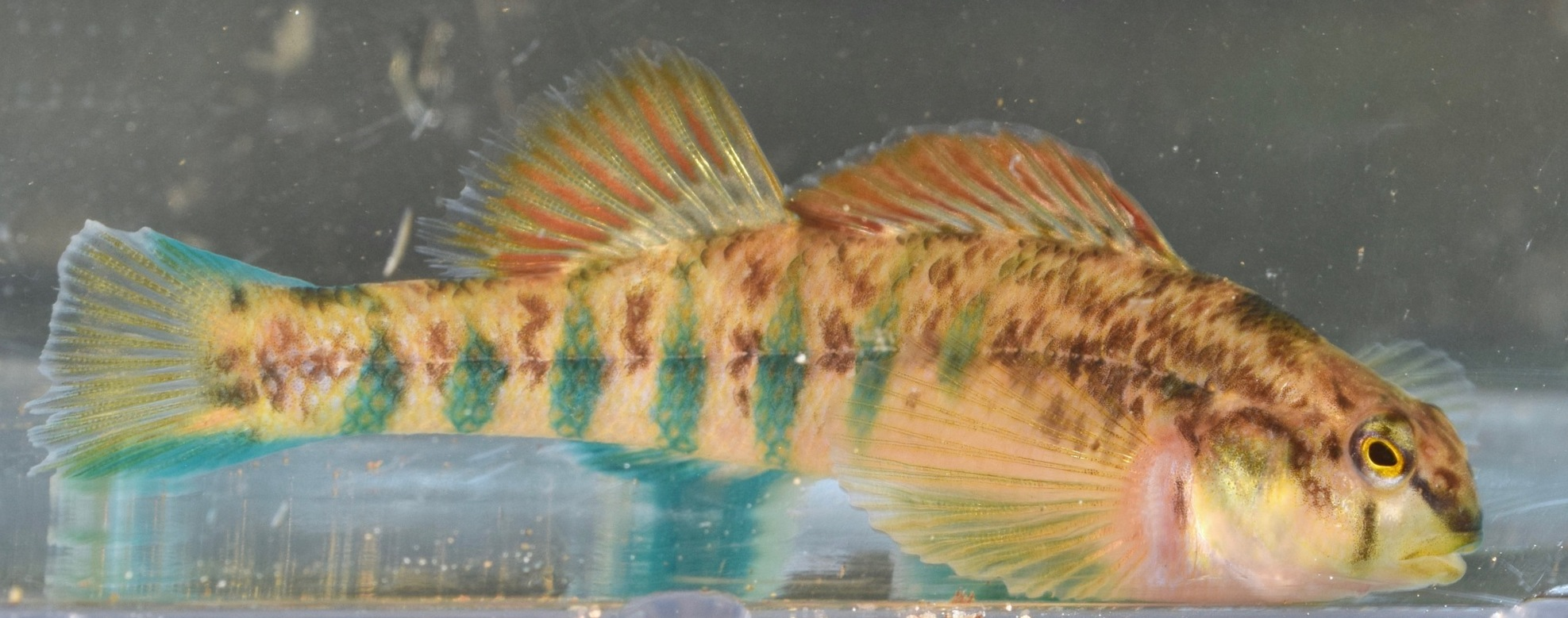
  - E. scotti
    Etheostoma scotti Bauer, Etnier & Burkhead, 1995 (Cherokee darter)
  - Etheostoma simoterum (Cope, 1868) (snubnose darter)
  - Etheostoma tallapoosae Suttkus & Etnier, 1991 (Tallapoosa darter)
  - Etheostoma zonistium R. M. Bailey & Etnier, 1988 (bandfin darter)
- Subgenus Vaillantia D.S. Jordan, 1878
  - Etheostoma chlorosoma (O. P. Hay, 1881) (bluntnose darter)
  - Etheostoma davisoni O. P. Hay, 1885 (Choctawhatchee darter)
- Subgenus Villora Hubbs & Cannon, 1935
  - Etheostoma edwini (C. L. Hubbs & Cannon, 1935) (brown darter)

Synonyms

- Etheostoma occidentale Powers & Mayden, 2007 (West Rim darter); valid as E. atripinne
- Etheostoma saludae (C. L. Hubbs & Cannon, 1935) (saluda darter); valid as E. collis
- Etheostoma tennesseense Powers & Mayden, 2007 (Tennessee darter); valid as E. simoterum
