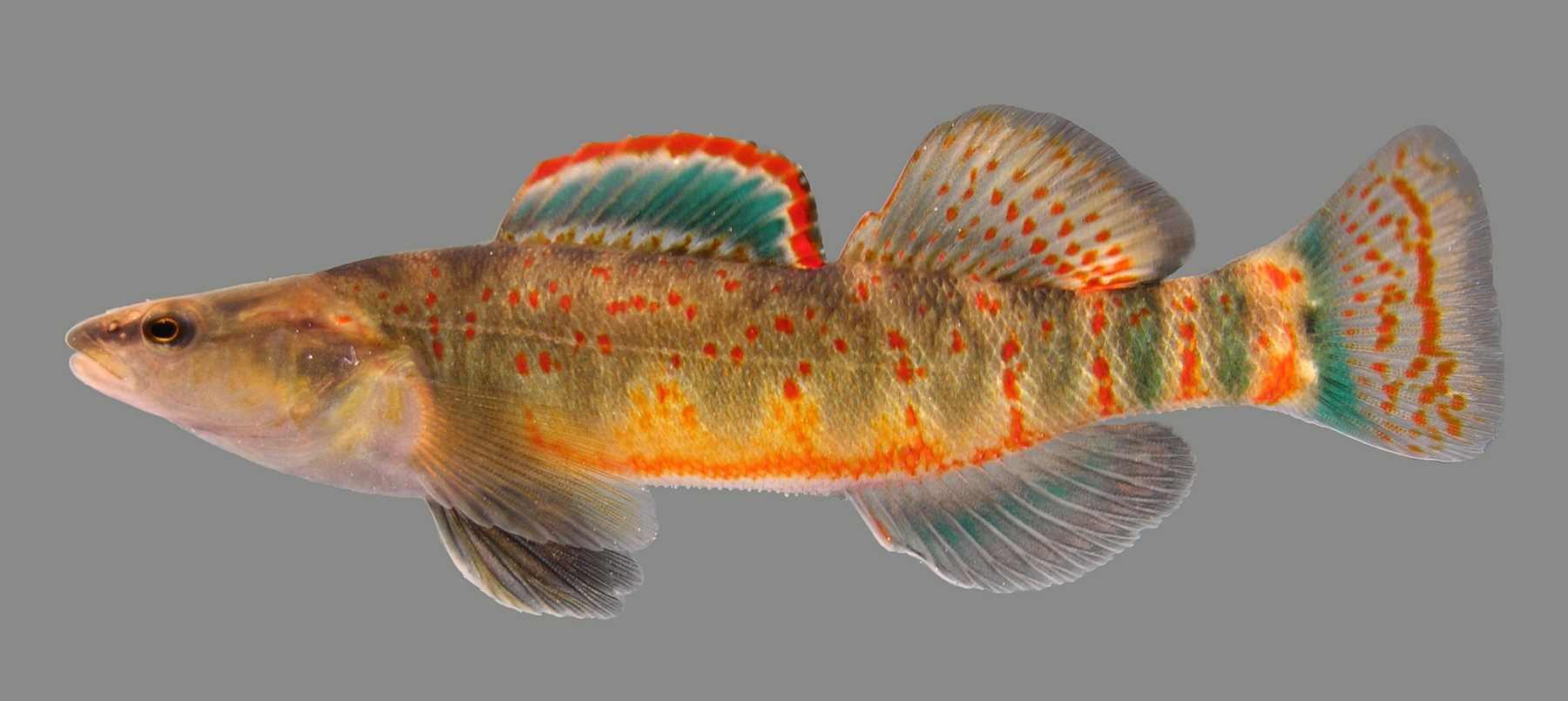

Conservation status
- Near Threatened (IUCN 3.1)

Scientific classification
- Kingdom: Animalia
- Phylum: Chordata
- Class: Actinopterygii
- Order: Perciformes
- Family: Percidae
- Genus: Etheostoma
- Species: E. spilotum

Binomial name
- Etheostoma spilotum (C. H. Gilbert, 1887)

= Kentucky arrow darter =

Species of fish

The Kentucky arrow darter (Etheostoma spilotum), sometimes known as the Cumberland Plateau darter, is a species of freshwater ray-finned fish, a darter from the subfamily Etheostomatinae, part of the family Percidae, which also contains the perches, ruffes and pikeperches. It is endemic to the eastern United States, where it is found only in the upper Kentucky River drainage in Kentucky. It inhabits rocky riffles and pools of headwaters, creeks and small rivers. This species can reach a length of 12 cm (4.7 in).

== Habitat and ecology ==
Habitat includes upland creeks and streams, generally in headwaters, but juveniles and sometimes adults are also sometimes found in larger streams; generally this darter occurs in slow to moderate current in cool, sluggish pools or areas above and below riffles (avoids swift currents) over bedrock, rubble, cobble, and pebble, often interspersed with sandy areas. Spawning occurs apparently in riffles in water about 5–15 cm deep or under or near rocks in raceways.

== Conservation ==
Habitat has been severely degraded and limited by water pollution from surface coal mining and gas exploration activities; removal of riparian vegetation; stream channelization; increased siltation associated with poor mining, logging, and agricultural practices; and deforestation of watersheds. These activities can permanently alter stream water quality (e.g., elevated conductivity) by contributing sediment, dissolved metals, and other solids to streams supporting populations. These water quality changes can be permanent and render these habitats unsuitable for the darter. Recent and past research has demonstrated that this darter is intolerant of these conditions, and it has been eliminated from a number of streams across its range. Current regulatory mechanisms have been inadequate to prevent these impacts.

Conservation Fisheries, Inc. (CFI) reported that CFI, in cooperation with Kentucky Department of Fish & Wildlife, developed captive propagation protocols for reintroduction of Etheostoma spilotum into streams within its native range to restore populations that have been extirpated. Reintroduction sites will be chosen where habitat conditions are suitable and there is some level of protection (e.g., within wildlife management area or national forest boundaries). Survivability and movement patterns of released fish will be assessed through mark-recapture methods and through periodic monitoring using non-invasive methods, such as visual census techniques. Accordingly, 110 juvenile Etheostoma spilotum were released to Sugar Creek, Kentucky in an effort to restore the species to a stream (near the source population) where the species had apparently been extirpated, but which exhibited currently suitable habitat.
