= Backwater darter =

Conservation status
- Least Concern (IUCN 3.1)

Scientific classification
- Kingdom: Animalia
- Phylum: Chordata
- Class: Actinopterygii
- Order: Perciformes
- Family: Percidae
- Genus: Etheostoma
- Species: E. zonifer

Binomial name
- Etheostoma zonifer (Hubbs & Cannon, 1935)

Synonyms
- Hololepis zonifer Hubbs & Cannon, 1935

Species of fish

The backwater darter (Etheostoma zonifer), a species of freshwater ray-finned fish, is a darter from the subfamily Etheostomatinae: part of the family Percidae that also contains the perches, ruffes, and pikeperches. The Backwater darter is endemic to the eastern United States, where it occurs in streams on the coastal plain in the Mobile Bay drainage in Alabama and Mississippi. Specifically, E. zonifer inhabits mud-bottomed, often vegetated, pools of sluggish creeks and small rivers. This species can reach a length of 4.4 cm (1.7 in).
