= Tuscumbia darter =

Conservation status
- Vulnerable (IUCN 3.1)

Scientific classification
- Kingdom: Animalia
- Phylum: Chordata
- Class: Actinopterygii
- Division: Teleostei
- Order: Perciformes
- Family: Percidae
- Genus: Etheostoma
- Species: E. tuscumbia

Binomial name
- Etheostoma tuscumbia C. H. Gilbert & Swain, 1887

Species of fish

The Tuscumbia darter (Etheostoma tuscumbia) is a species of freshwater ray-finned fish, a darter from the subfamily Etheostomatinae, part of the family Percidae, which also contains the perches, ruffes and pikeperches. It is endemic to the southeastern United States where it occurs in well-vegetated springs along the Tennessee River in Alabama. This species can reach a length of 6.1 centimetres (2.4 in) TL though most only reach about 4 centimetres (1.6 in).
