= Highland darter =

Scientific classification
- Kingdom: Animalia
- Phylum: Chordata
- Class: Actinopterygii
- Order: Perciformes
- Family: Percidae
- Genus: Etheostoma
- Species: E. teddyroosevelt

Binomial name
- Etheostoma teddyroosevelt Layman & Mayden, 2012
- Etheostoma teddyroosevelt range

Species of fish

The highland darter (Etheostoma teddyroosevelt) is a species of freshwater ray-finned fish, a darter from the subfamily Etheostomatinae, part of the family Percidae, which also contains the perches, ruffes and pikeperches. It is found in the Arkansas and upper White river drainages on the Ozark Plateau of Missouri, Arkansas, extreme southeastern Kansas, and northeastern Oklahoma.

It was named after the 26th president of the United States Theodore Roosevelt and for his enduring legacy in environmental conservation and stewardship, including the designation of vast areas as national forests, wildlife refuges, national monuments, and national parks, and his efforts to forge the American Museum of Natural History.
