= Río Salado darter =

Conservation status
- Critically Endangered (IUCN 3.1)

Scientific classification
- Kingdom: Animalia
- Phylum: Chordata
- Class: Actinopterygii
- Order: Perciformes
- Family: Percidae
- Genus: Etheostoma
- Species: E. segrex

Binomial name
- Etheostoma segrex (Norris & Minckley, 1997)

Species of fish

The Río Salado darter (Etheostoma segrex) is a species of freshwater ray-finned fish, a darter from the subfamily Etheostomatinae, part of the family Percidae, which also contains the perches, ruffes and pikeperches. It is endemic to the Río Salado and its tributaries in Mexico. It inhabits unvegetated river bottoms with moderate turbulence over gravel and small cobble substrate. This species can reach a length of 4.4 cm (1.7 in).
