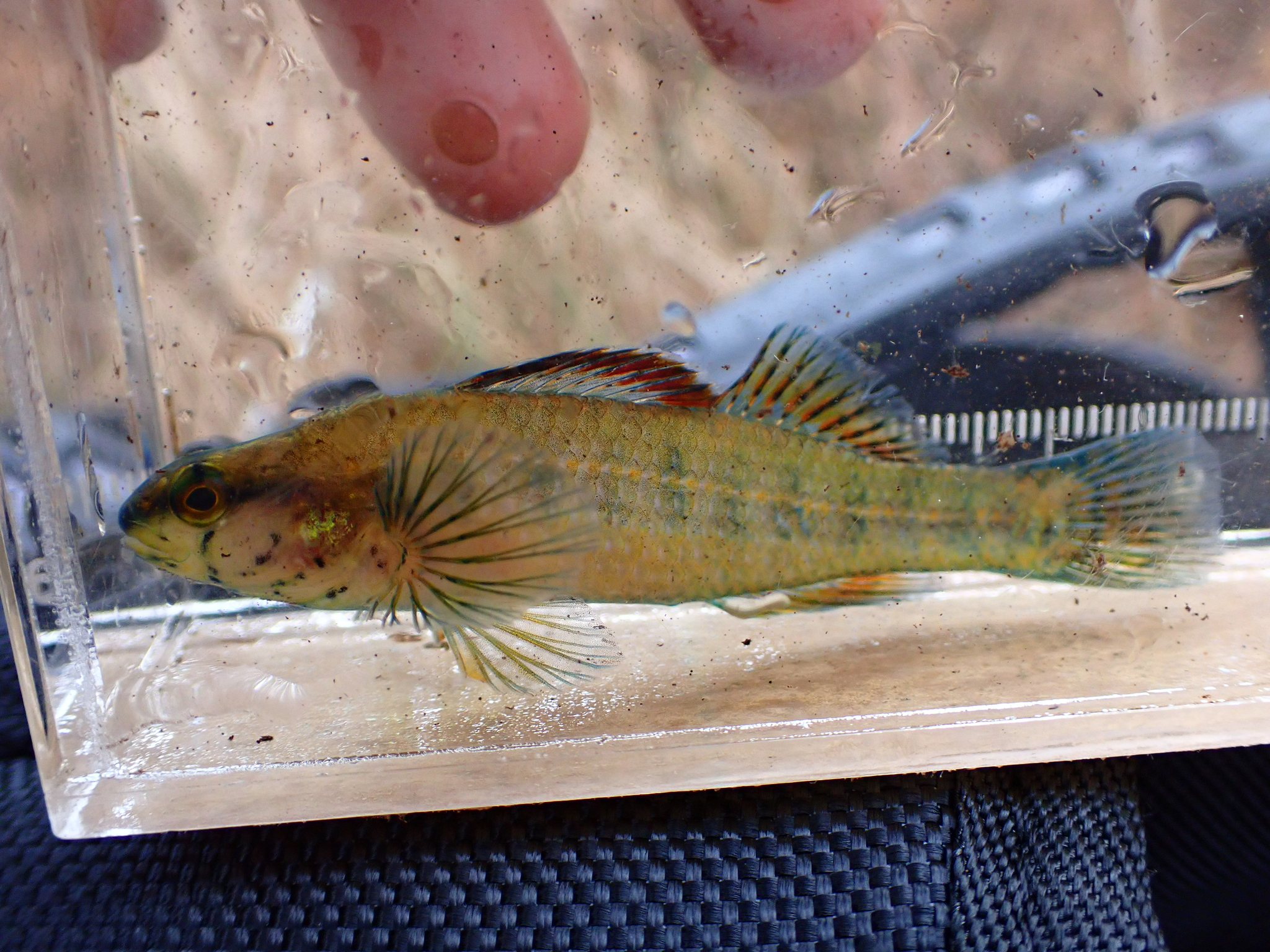

Conservation status
- Least Concern (IUCN 3.1)

Scientific classification
- Kingdom: Animalia
- Phylum: Chordata
- Class: Actinopterygii
- Division: Teleostei
- Order: Perciformes
- Family: Percidae
- Genus: Etheostoma
- Species: E. mariae

Binomial name
- Etheostoma mariae (Fowler, 1947)

Synonyms
- Belophlox mariae Fowler, 1947

= Pinewoods darter =

Species of fish

The pinewoods darter (Etheostoma mariae) is a species of freshwater ray-finned fish, a darter from the subfamily Etheostomatinae, part of the family Percidae, which also contains the perches, ruffes and pikeperches. It is endemic to the eastern United States where it is only known to occur in the Little Peedee River system in the Carolinas. It inhabits creeks, preferring gravel riffles and vegetated areas with strong currents. This species can reach a length of 7.6 centimetres (3.0 in) TL though most only reach about 5.2 centimetres (2.0 in).
