= Brook darter =

Conservation status
- Least Concern (IUCN 3.1)

Scientific classification
- Kingdom: Animalia
- Phylum: Chordata
- Class: Actinopterygii
- Order: Perciformes
- Family: Percidae
- Genus: Etheostoma
- Species: E. burri

Binomial name
- Etheostoma burri Ceas & Page, 1997

Species of fish

The brook darter (Etheostoma burri) is a small species of freshwater ray-finned fish, a darter from the subfamily Etheostomatinae, part of the family Percidae, which also contains the perches, ruffes and pikeperches. It is endemic to the eastern United States, where it occurs in the upper Black River system in Missouri, from headwaters to where the River flows into the Mississippi River alluvial plain. It inhabits shallow gravel riffles, sometimes rocky runs and pools, of headwaters, creeks, and small rivers. The brook darter was first formally described in 1997 by Patrick A. Ceas and Lawrence M. Page with the type locality given as the Black River on the northeastern outskirts of Mill Spring, Missouri. The specific name honours Brooks M. Burr, Emeritus Professor and Curator of Fishes of Southern Illinois University who first brought the fish to the attention of the authors.
