= Sooty darter =

Conservation status
- Least Concern (IUCN 3.1)

Scientific classification
- Kingdom: Animalia
- Phylum: Chordata
- Class: Actinopterygii
- Order: Perciformes
- Family: Percidae
- Genus: Etheostoma
- Species: E. olivaceum

Binomial name
- Etheostoma olivaceum Braasch & Page, 1979

Species of fish

The sooty darter (Etheostoma olivaceum) is a species of freshwater ray-finned fish, a darter from the subfamily Etheostomatinae, part of the family Percidae, which also contains the perches, ruffes and pikeperches. It is endemic the eastern United States. It is found in the Cumberland River basin where it is found only in the lower portion of the Caney Fork system and nearby tributaries in central Tennessee. It inhabits streams and creeks occurring in pools and their nearby riffles. This species can reach a length of 8 centimetres (3.1 in) TL though most only reach about 5 centimetres (2.0 in).
