= Strawberry darter =

Conservation status
- Least Concern (IUCN 3.1)

Scientific classification
- Kingdom: Animalia
- Phylum: Chordata
- Class: Actinopterygii
- Order: Perciformes
- Family: Percidae
- Genus: Etheostoma
- Species: E. fragi

Binomial name
- Etheostoma fragi (Distler, 1968)

Species of fish

The strawberry darter (Etheostoma fragi) is a species of freshwater ray-finned fish, a darter from the subfamily Etheostomatinae, part of the family Percidae, which also contains the perches, ruffes and pikeperches. It is endemic to the eastern United States, where it occurs in includes upland headwaters of the Strawberry River in Arkansas. It inhabits shallow gravel riffles, rocky runs, and pools of headwaters, creeks, and small rivers.
