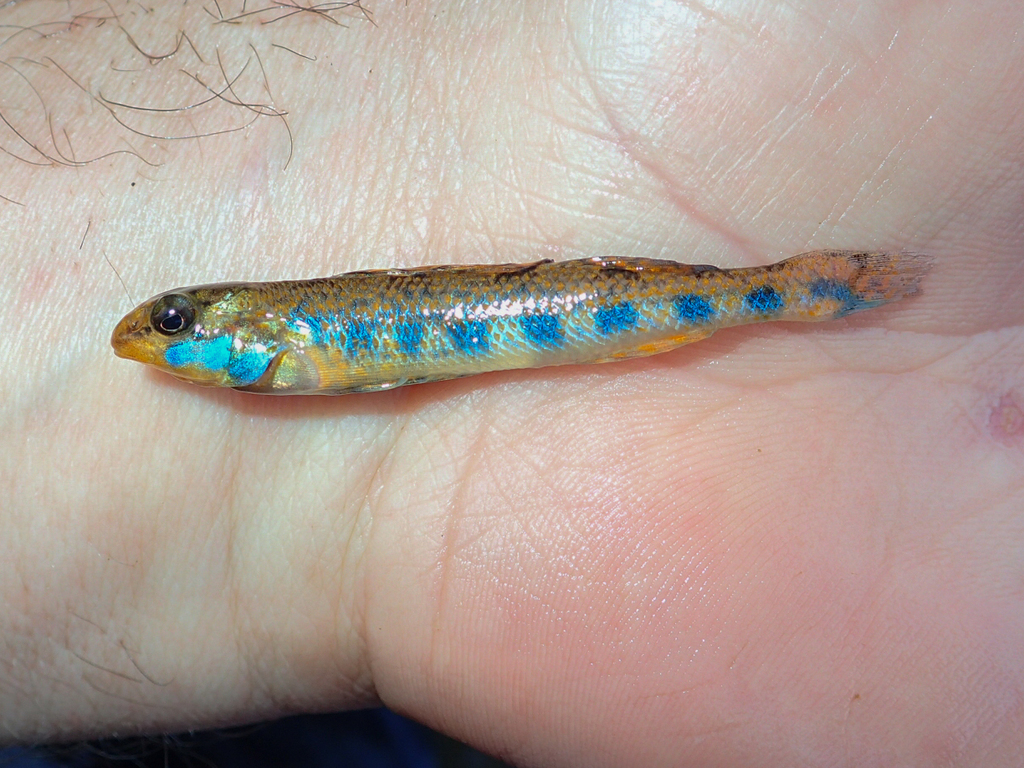

Scientific classification
- Kingdom: Animalia
- Phylum: Chordata
- Class: Actinopterygii
- Order: Perciformes
- Family: Percidae
- Genus: Etheostoma
- Species: E. jimmycarter

Binomial name
- Etheostoma jimmycarter Layman & Mayden, 2012

= Bluegrass darter =

Species of fish

The bluegrass darter (Etheostoma jimmycarter) is a fish found in the Green River drainage in Kentucky and Tennessee.

It was named after the 39th president of the United States Jimmy Carter for his environmental leadership and accomplishments in the areas of national energy policy and wilderness protection, and his lifelong commitment to social justice and basic human rights.

== See also ==
- List of organisms named after famous people (born 1900–1924)
