= Current darter =

Conservation status
- Least Concern (IUCN 3.1)

Scientific classification
- Kingdom: Animalia
- Phylum: Chordata
- Class: Actinopterygii
- Division: Teleostei
- Order: Perciformes
- Family: Percidae
- Genus: Etheostoma
- Species: E. uniporum

Binomial name
- Etheostoma uniporum (Distler, 1968

Species of fish

The current darter (Etheostoma uniporum) is a species of freshwater ray-finned fish, a darter from the subfamily Etheostomatinae, part of the family Percidae, which also contains the perches, ruffes and pikeperches. It is endemic to the eastern United States. This fish occurs in the Black River drainage system from south central Missouri to north central Arkansas, where it is found in shallow gravel riffles, sometimes rocky runs and pools of headwaters and creeks.
