= Etheostoma duryi =

Conservation status
- Least Concern (IUCN 3.1)

Scientific classification
- Kingdom: Animalia
- Phylum: Chordata
- Class: Actinopterygii
- Order: Perciformes
- Family: Percidae
- Genus: Etheostoma
- Species: E. duryi

Binomial name
- Etheostoma duryi Henshall, 1889

Species of fish

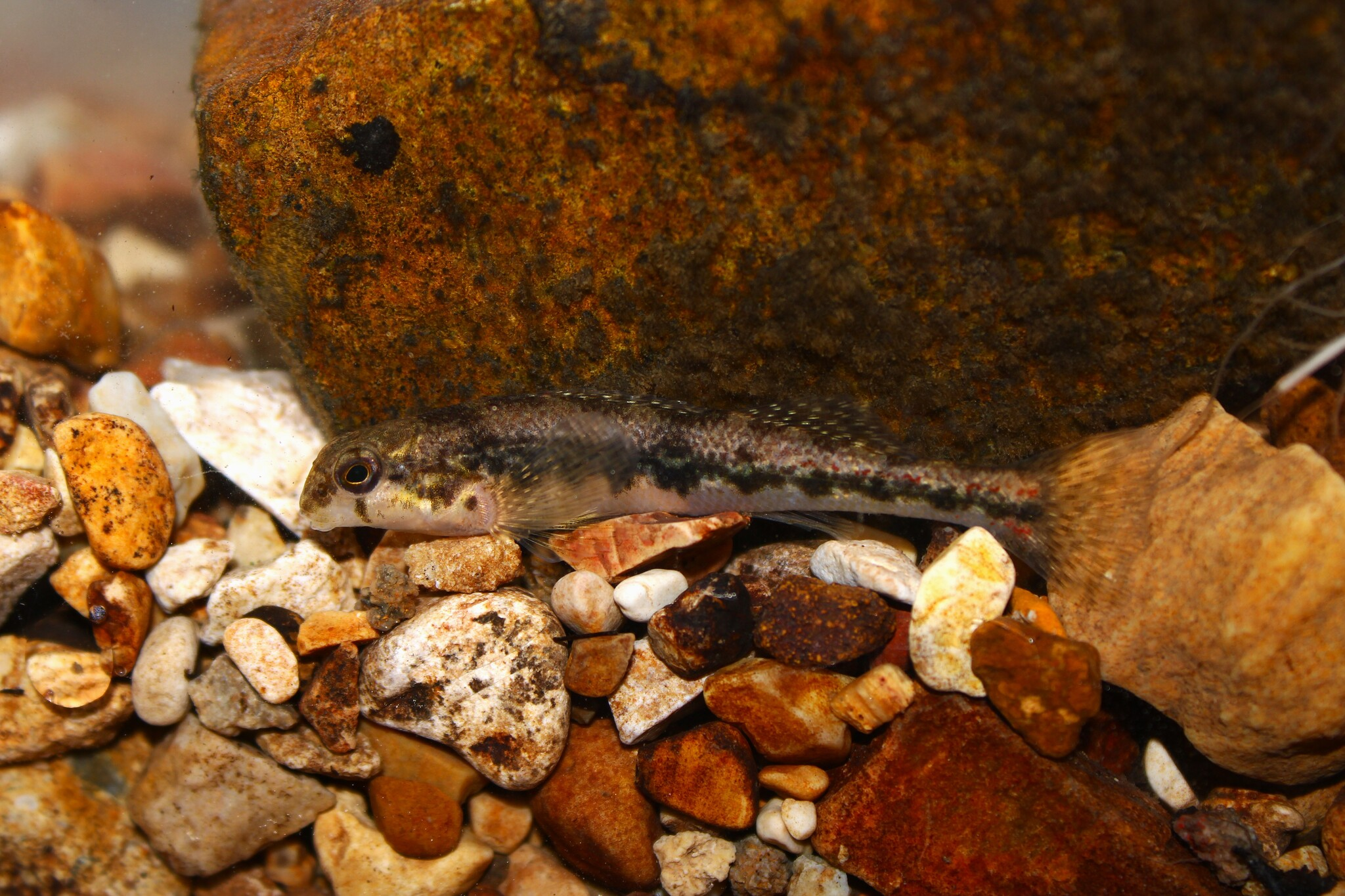
Etheostoma duryi, United States

Etheostoma duryi, the black darter, is a species of darter endemic to the eastern United States, where it occurs in the drainage of the Tennessee River in the states of Tennessee, Georgia, and Alabama. It is an inhabitant of rocky pools in streams and smaller rivers and their adjacent riffles. This species can reach a length of 7.2 cm (2.8 in), though most only reach about 5 cm (2.0 in). The specific epithet honors Charles Dury (1847–1931), who collected the original type specimens.
