= List of fishes of Tennessee =

The location of the State of Tennessee in the United States of America.

Topographic map of Tennessee

The U.S. state of Tennessee has a diverse array of fresh-water fish species, owing to its large network of rivers and creeks, with major waterways in the state including the Mississippi River which forms its western border, the Tennessee River, the Cumberland River, and the Duck River.

Tennessee has more than 300 species of fishes.

The following tags note species in each of those categories:

- (I) - Introduced
- (E) - Endemic

== Order Petromyzontiformes (Lampreys) ==
Family Petromyzontidae (Northern lampreys)

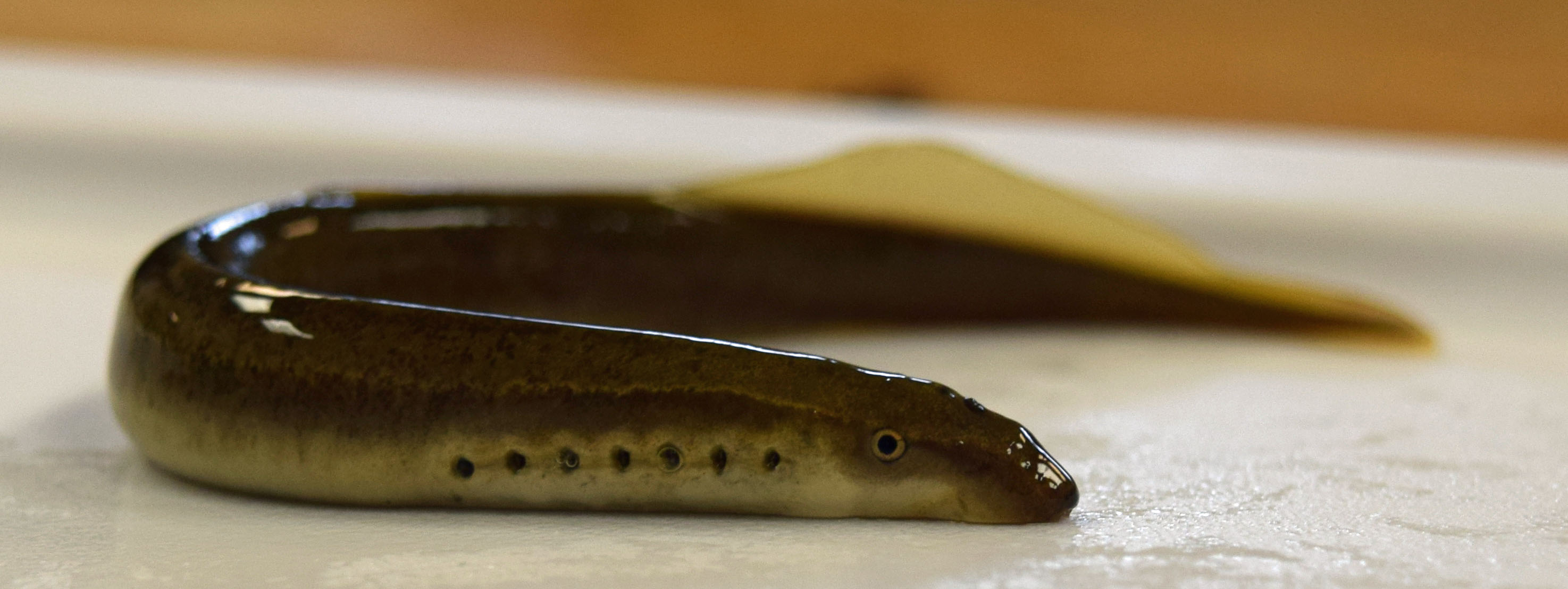
Least brook lamprey

- Least brook lamprey (Lampetra aepyptera)
- American brook lamprey (Lethenteron appendix)
- Ohio lamprey (Ichthyomyzon bdellium)
- Chestnut lamprey (Ichthyomyzon castaneus)
- Southern brook lamprey (Ichthyomyzon gagei)
- Mountain brook lamprey (Ichthyomyzon greeleyi)
- Silver lamprey (Ichthyomyzon unicuspis)

== Order Acipenseriformes (Sturgeons & paddlefish) ==
Family Acipenseridae (Sturgeons)

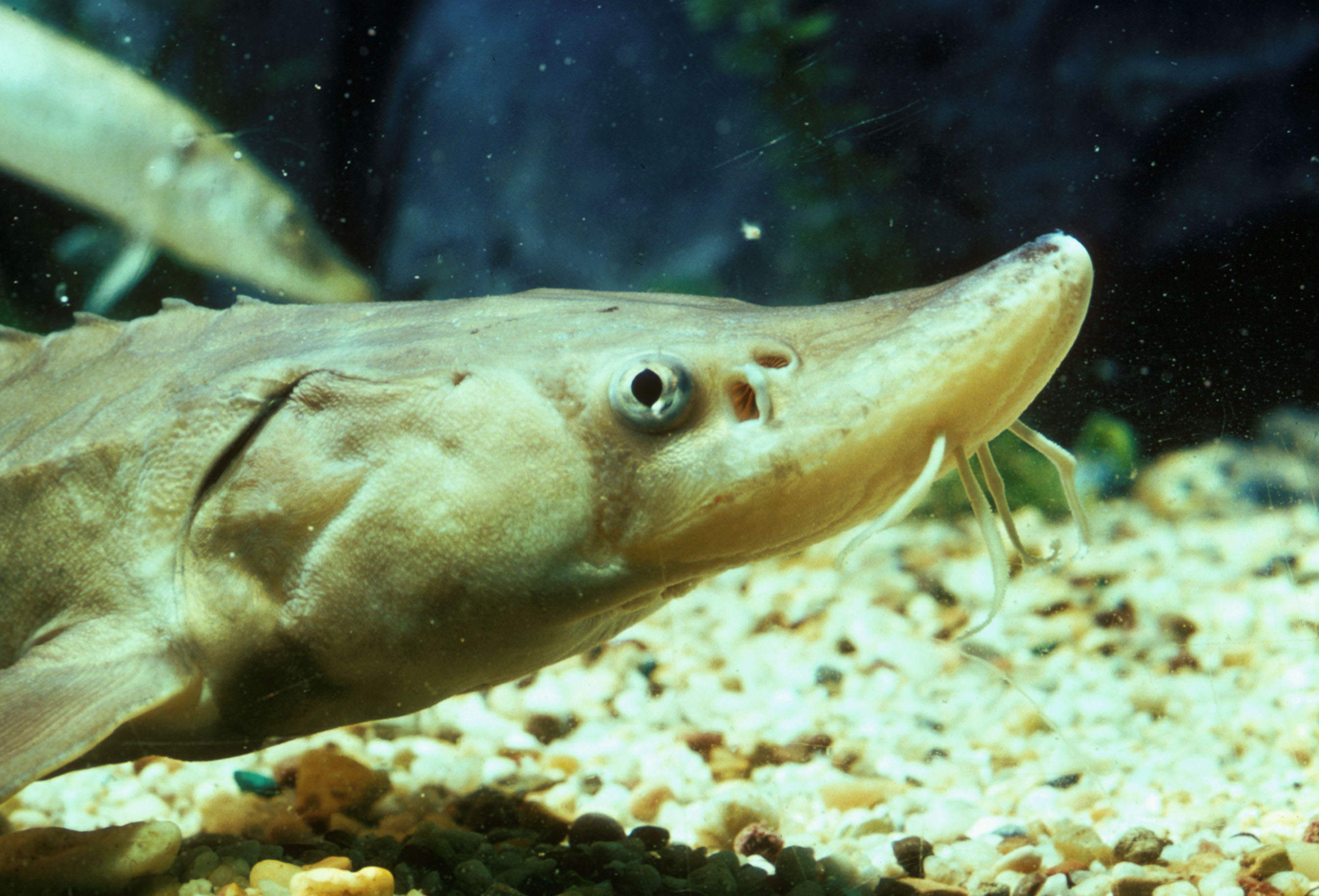
Lake sturgeon

- Lake sturgeon (Acipenser fulvescens)
- Pallid sturgeon (Scaphirhynchus albus)
- Shovelnose sturgeon (Scaphirhynchus platorynchus)

Family Polyodontidae (Paddlefish)

- American paddlefish (Polyodon spathula)

== Order Lepisosteiformes (Gars) ==
Family Lepisosteidae (Gars)

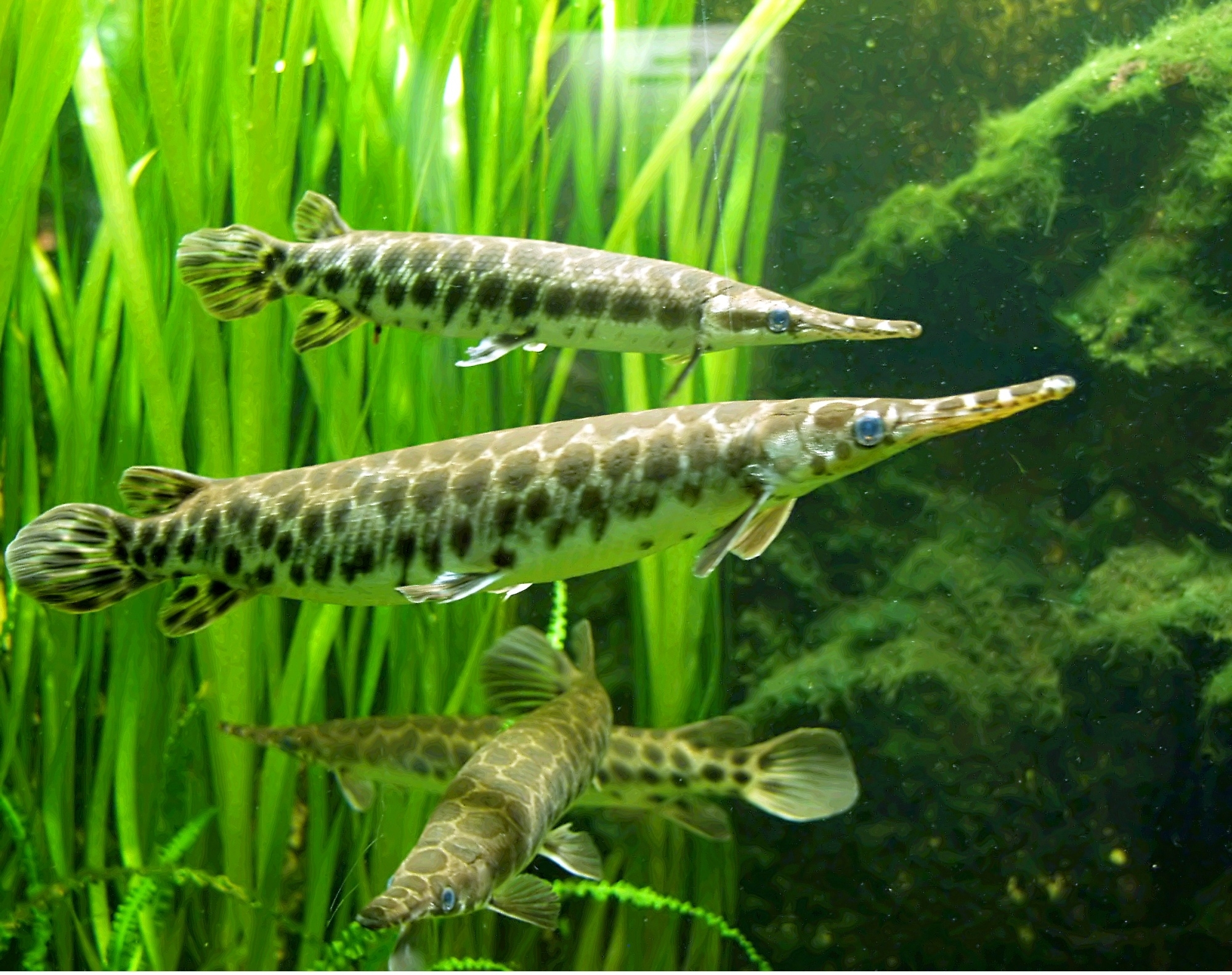
Spotted gar

- Alligator gar (Atractosteus spatula)
- Spotted gar (Lepisosteus oculatus)
- Longnose gar (Lepisosteus osseus)
- Shortnose gar (Lepisosteus platostomus)

== Order Amiiformes (Bowfins) ==
Family Amiidae (Bowfins)

- Eyetail bowfin (Amia ocellicauda)

== Order Hiodontiformes (Mooneyes) ==
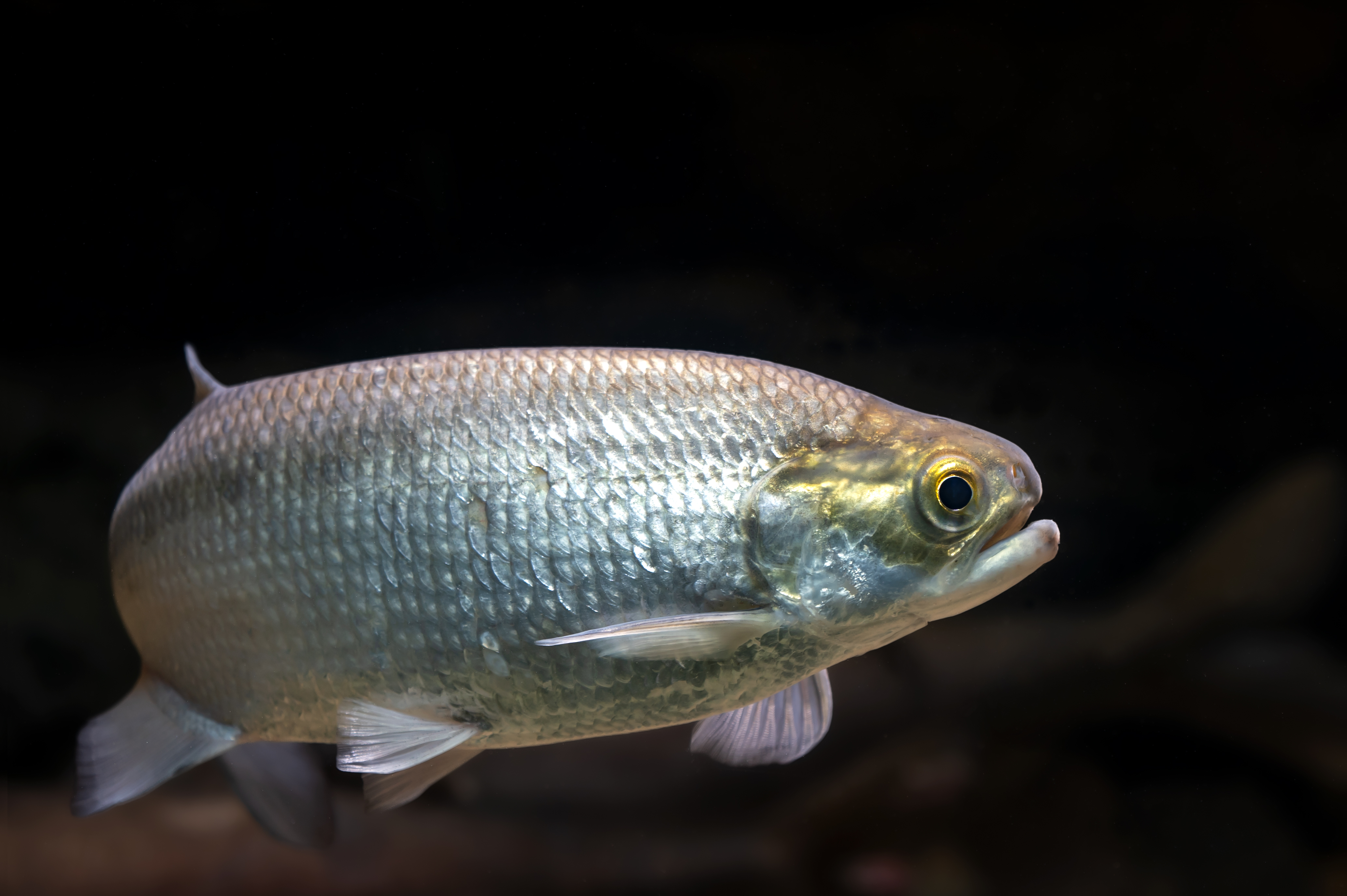
Goldeye

Family Hiodontidae (Mooneyes)

- Goldeye (Hiodon alosoides)
- Mooneye (Hiodon tergisus)

== Order Anguilliformes (Eels) ==
Family Anguillidae (Freshwater eels)

- American eel (Anguilla rostrata)

== Order Clupeiformes (Herrings & relatives) ==
Family Alosidae (Shads & sardines)

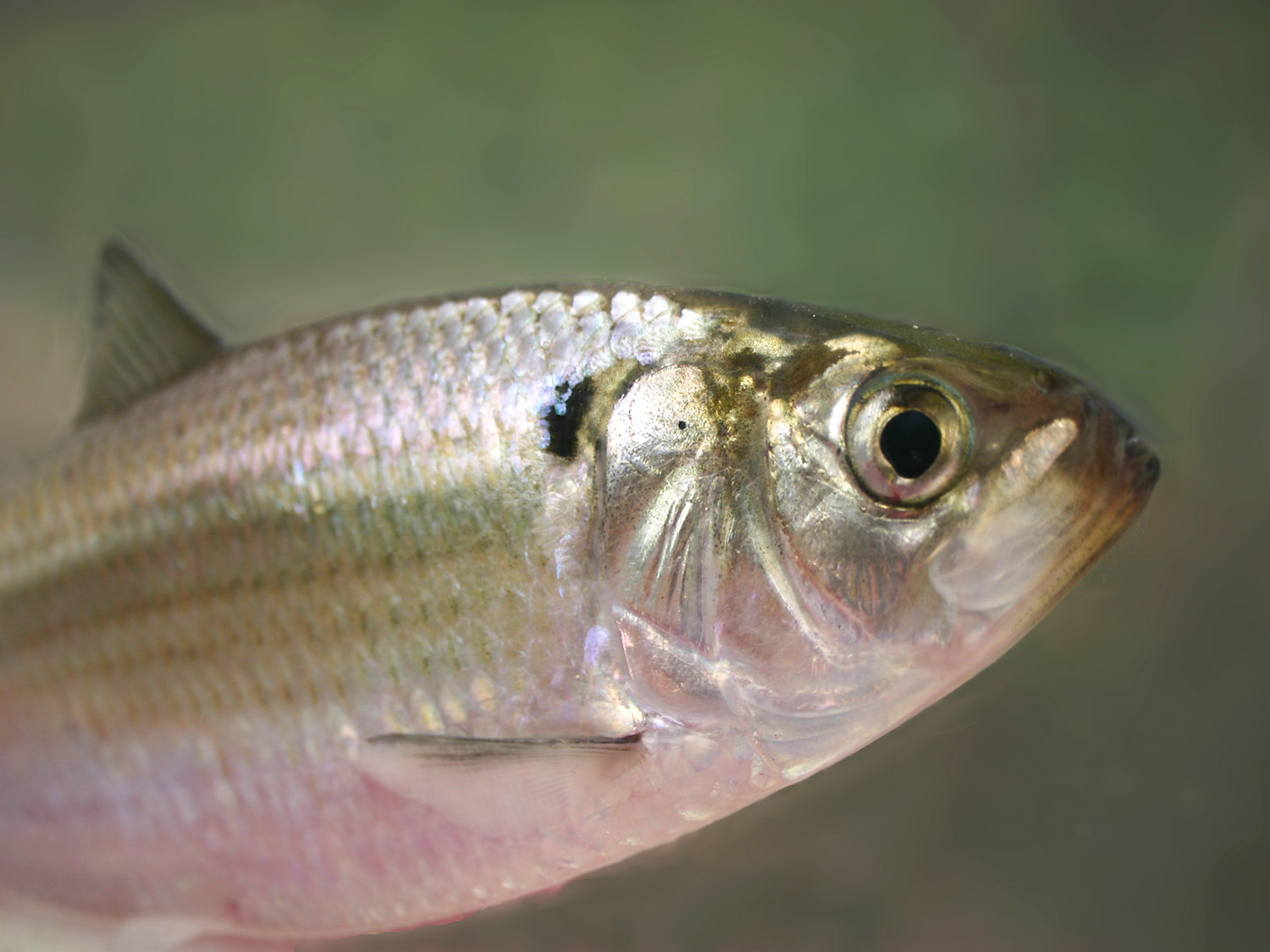
American gizzard shad

- Alabama shad (Alosa alabamae)
- Skipjack shad (Alosa chrysochloris)
- Alewife (Alosa pseudoharengus)

Family Dorosomatidae (Thread herrings & gizzard shads)

- American gizzard shad (Dorosoma cepedianum)
- Threadfin shad (Dorosoma petenense)

== Order Cypriniformes (Carps, minnows, and relatives) ==
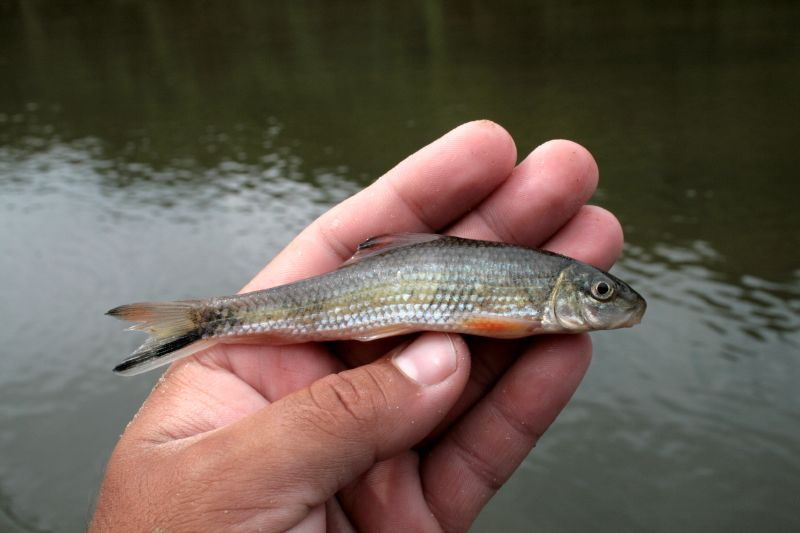
Blacktail Redhorse

Family Catostomidae (Suckers)

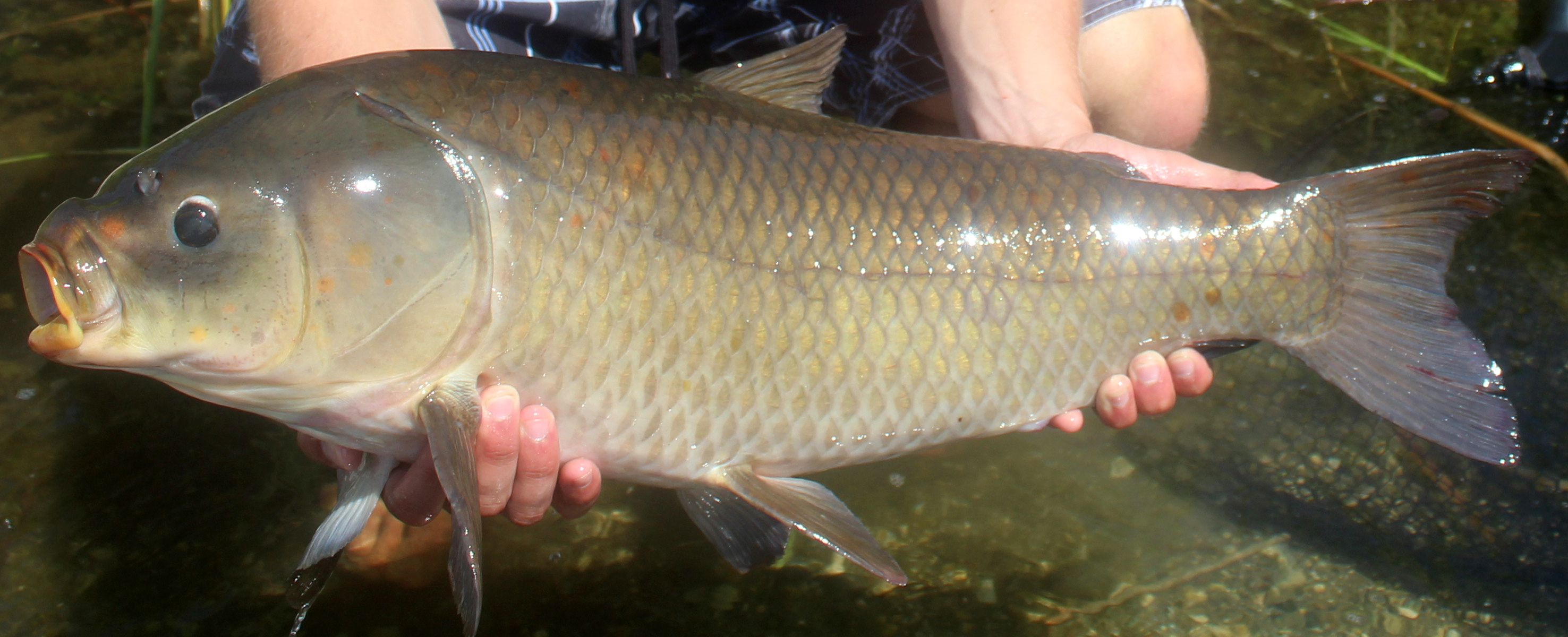
Bigmouth Buffalo

- River carpsucker (Carpiodes carpio)
- Quillback (Carpiodes cyprinus)
- Highfin carpsucker (Carpiodes velifer)
- White sucker (Catostomus commersonii)
- Blue sucker (Cycleptus elongatus)
- Creek chubsucker (Erimyzon oblongus)
- Lake chubsucker (Erimyzon sucetta)
- Alabama hogsucker (Hypentelium etowanum)
- Northern hogsucker (Hypentelium nigricans)
- Smallmouth buffalo (Ictiobus bubalus)
- Bigmouth buffalo (Ictiobus cyprinellus)
- Black buffalo (Ictiobus niger)
- Spotted sucker (Minytrema melanops)
- Silver redhorse (Moxostoma anisurum)
- Smallmouth redhorse (Moxostoma breviceps)
- River redhorse (Moxostoma carinatum)
- Golden redhorse (Moxostoma erythrurum)
- Shorthead redhorse (Moxostoma macrolepidotum)
- Blacktail redhorse (Moxostoma poecilurum)

Family Cyprinidae (cyprinids)

- Goldfish (Carassius auratus) (I)
- European carp (Cyprinus carpio) (I)
- Amur carp (Cyprinus rubrofuscus) (I)

Family Leuciscidae (True minnows)

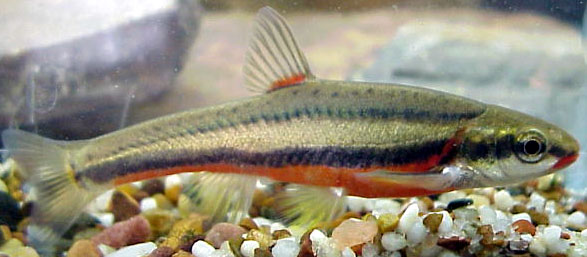
Laurel dace is endemic to Tennessee

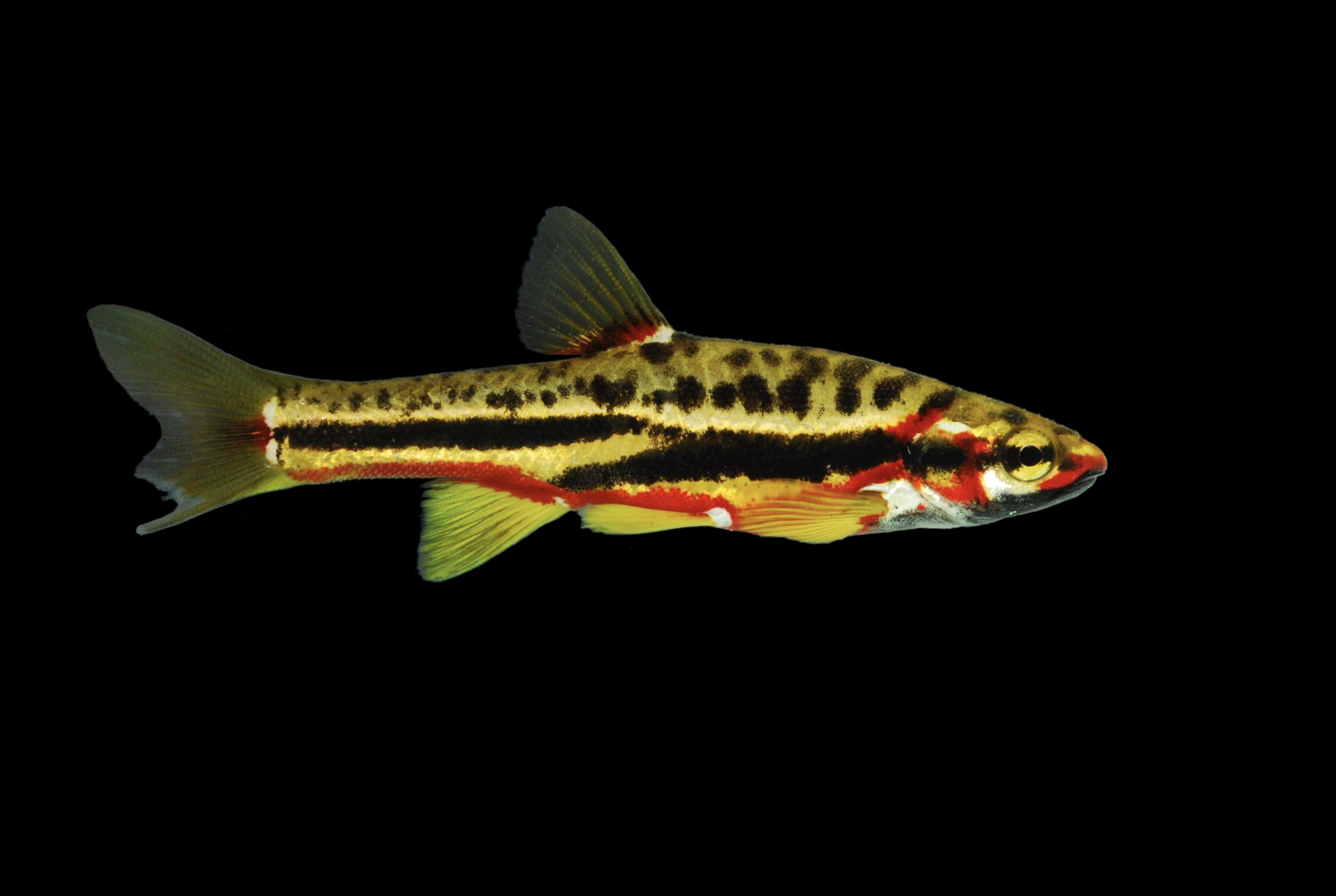
Mountain redbelly dace

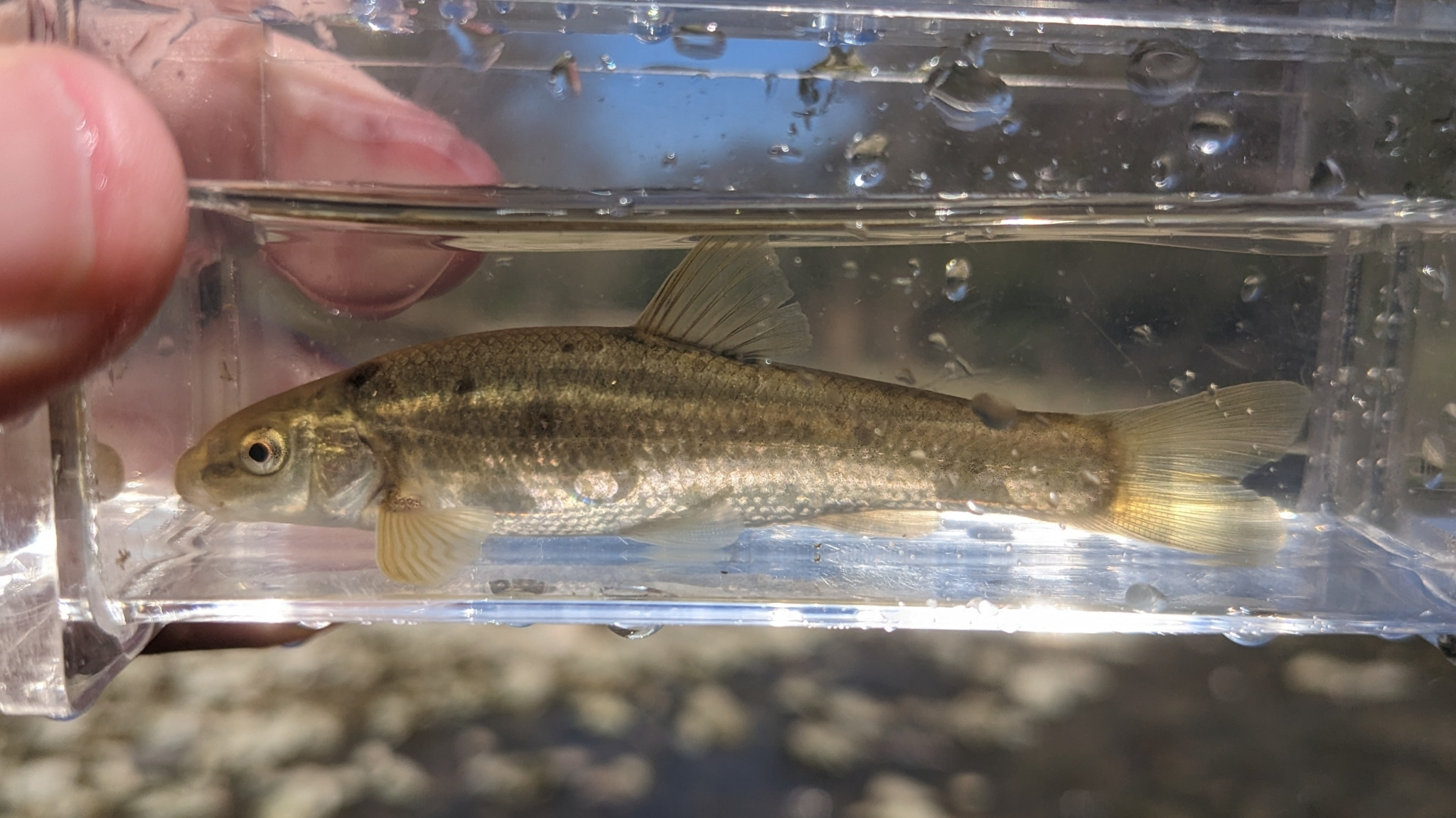
Central stoneroller

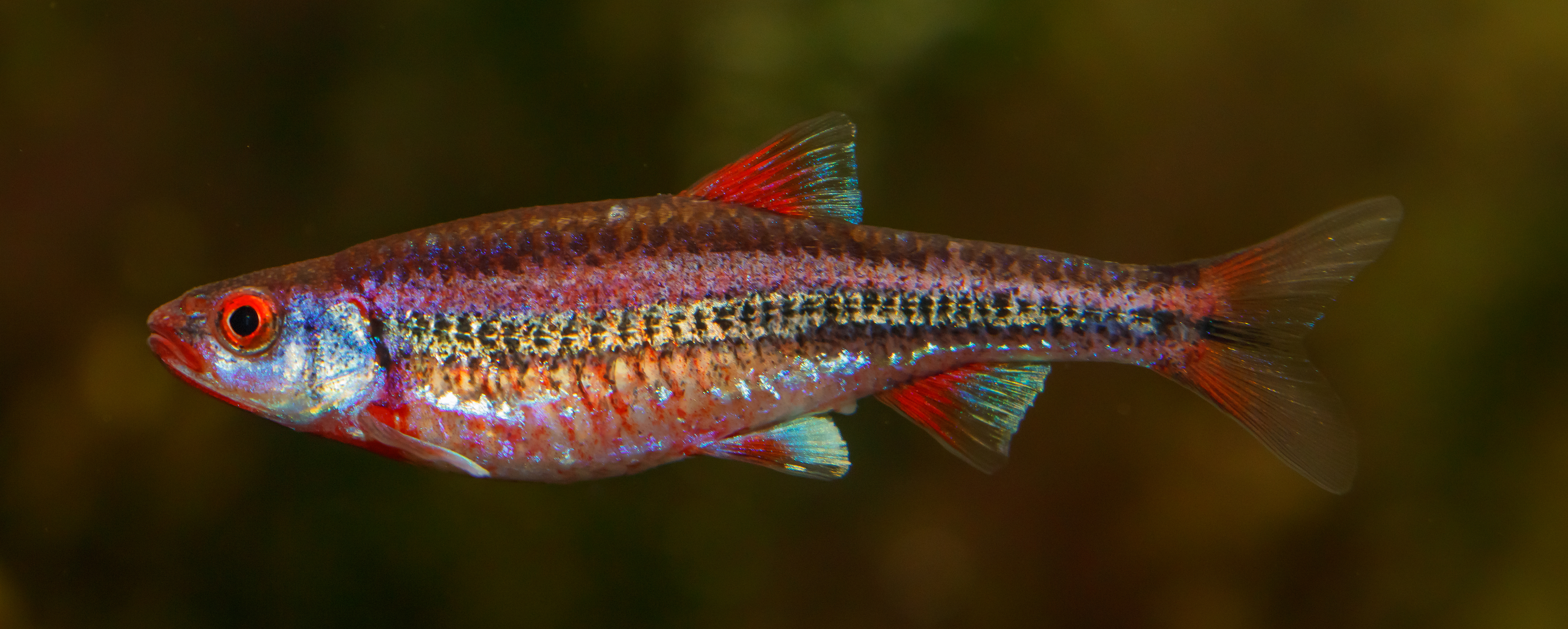
Rainbow shiner

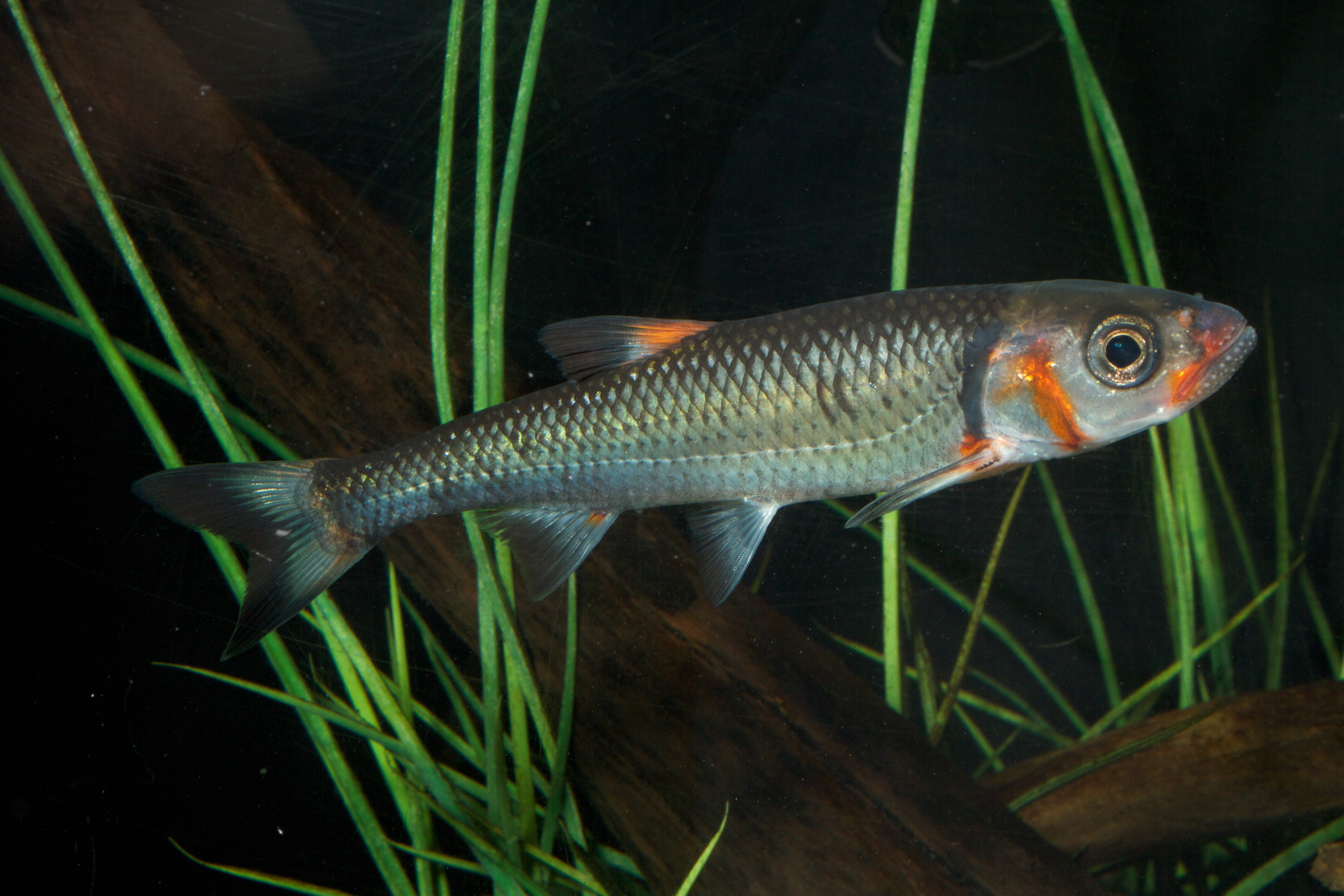
Warpaint shiner

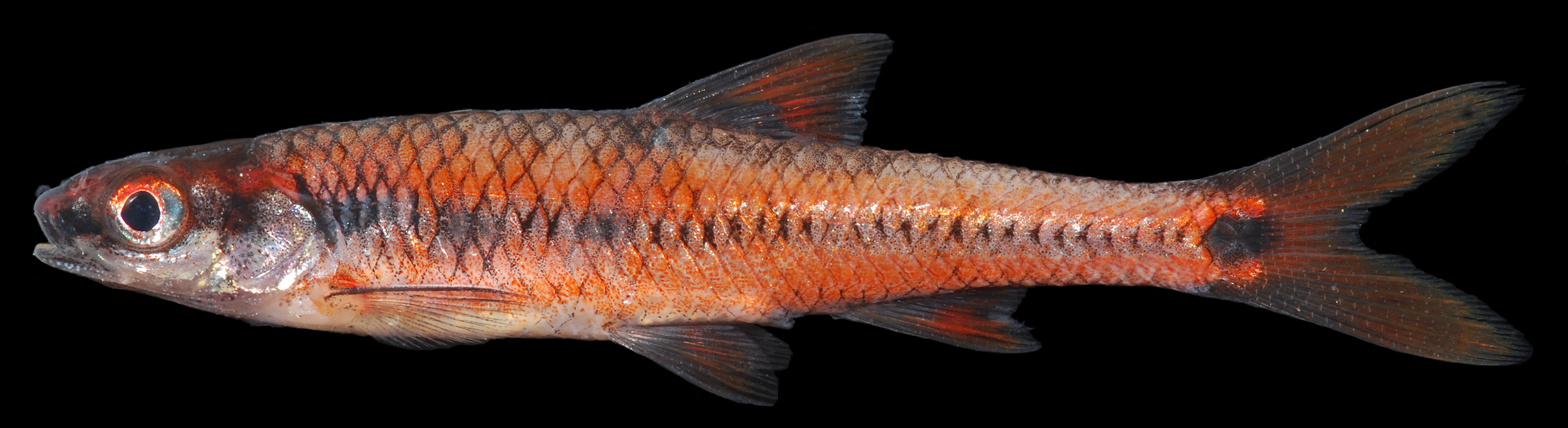
Taillight shiner

- River shiner (Alburnops blennius)
- Ironcolor shiner (Alburnops chalybaeus)
- Central stoneroller (Campostoma anomalum)
- Largescale stoneroller (Campostoma oligolepis)
- Blackside dace (Chrosomus cumberlandensis)
- Southern redbelly dace (Chrosomus erythrogaster)
- Mountain redbelly dace (Chrosomus oreas)
- Laurel dace (Chrosomus saylori) (E)
- Tennessee dace (Chrosomus tennesseensis)
- Warpaint shiner (Coccotis coccogenis)
- Blue shiner (Cyprinella caerulea)
- Alabama shiner (Cyprinella callistia)
- Spotfin chub (Cyprinella monacha)
- Tricolor shiner (Cyprinella trichroistia)
- Steelcolor shiner (Cyprinella whipplei)
- Silverjaw minnow (Ericymba buccatus)
- Streamline chub (Erimystax dissimilis)
- Blotched chub (Erimystax insignis)
- Flame chub (Hemitremia flammea)
- Brassy minnow (Hybognathus hankinsoni)
- Pallid shiner (Hybopsis amnis)
- Rainbow shiner (Hydrophlox chrosomus)
- Saffron shiner (Hydrophlox rubricroceus)
- White shiner (Luxilus albeolus)
- Striped shiner (Luxilus chrysocephalus)
- Common shiner (Luxilus cornutus)
- Scarlet shiner (Lythrurus fasciolaris)
- Redfin shiner (Lythrurus umbratilis)
- Sicklefin chub (Macrhybopsis meeki)
- Redtail chub (Nocomis effusus)
- River chub (Nocomis micropogon)
- Golden shiner (Notemigonus crysoleucas)
- Palezone shiner (Notropis albizonatus)
- Taillight shiner (Notropis maculatus)
- Rosyface shiner (Notropis rubellus)
- Bedrock shiner (Notropis rupestris) (E)
- Ghost shiner (Paranotropis buchanani)
- Tennessee shiner (Paranotropis leuciodus)
- Mimic shiner (Paranotropis volucellus)
- Bluntnose minnow (Pimephales notatus)
- Fathead minnow (Pimephales promelas)
- Bullhead minnow (Pimephales vigilax)
- Flathead chub (Platygobio gracilis)
- Creek chub (Semotilus atromaculatus)

Family Xenocyprididae (xenocyprins)

- Grass carp (Ctenopharyngodon idella) (I)
- Silver carp (Hypophthalmichthys molitrix) (I)
- Bighead carp (Hypophthalmichthys nobilis) (I)

== Order Siluriformes (Catfishes) ==
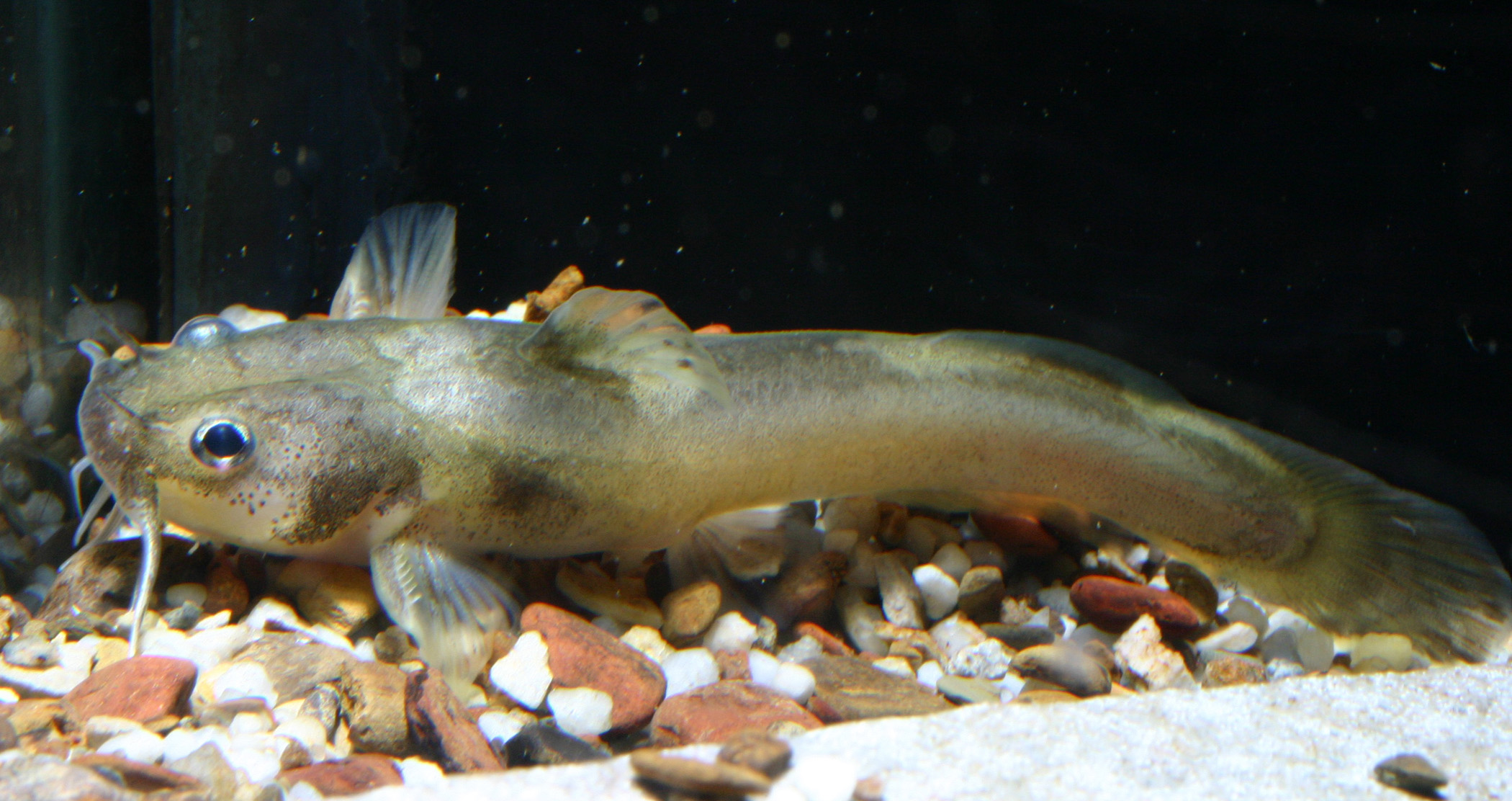
Chucky madtom is endemic to Tennessee

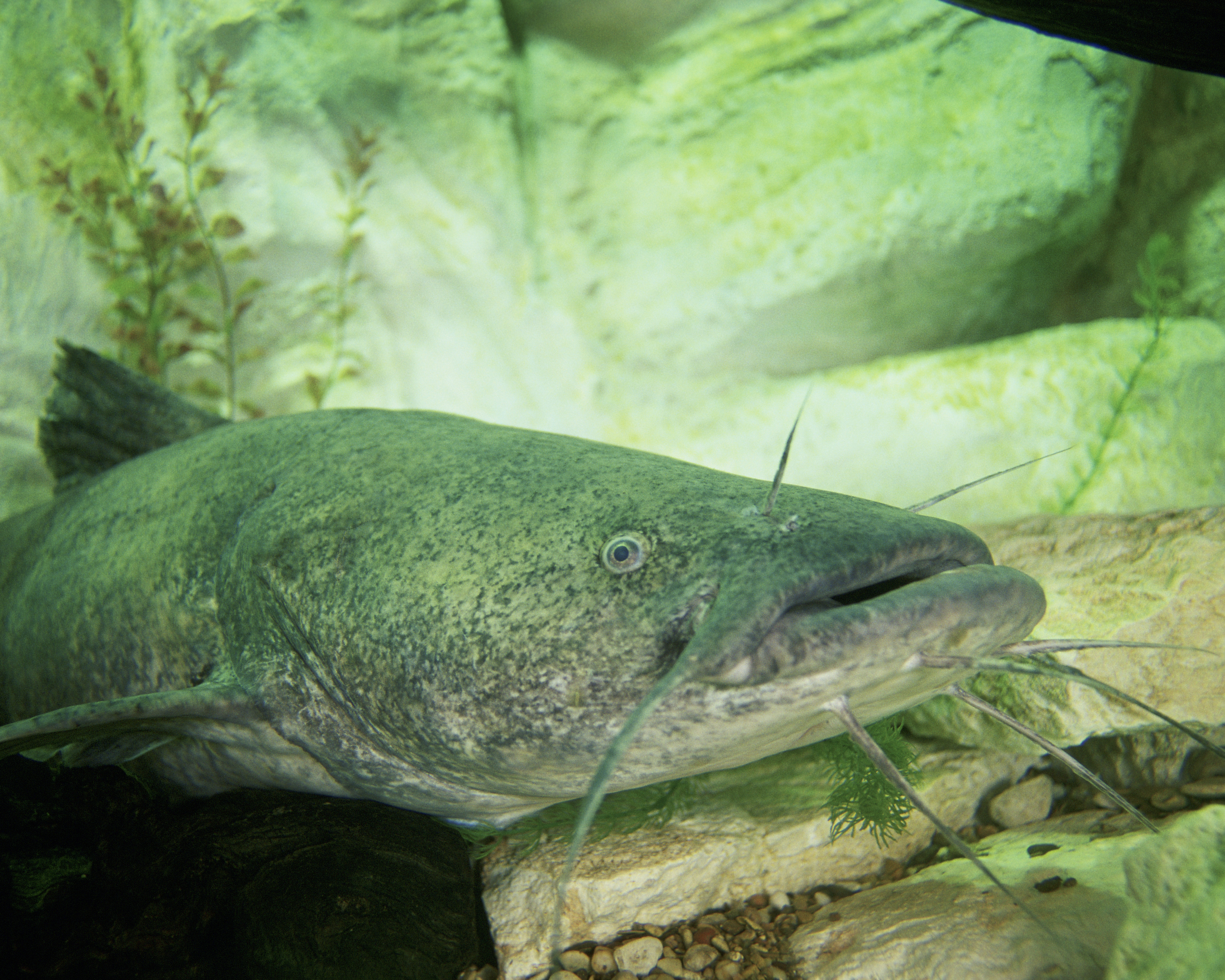
Flathead catfish

Family Ictaluridae (North American freshwater catfishes)

- White bullhead (Ameiurus catus)
- Black bullhead (Ameiurus melas)
- Yellow bullhead (Ameiurus natalis)
- Brown bullhead (Ameiurus nebulosus)
- Blue catfish (Ictalurus furcatus)
- Channel catfish (Ictalurus punctatus)
- Smoky madtom (Noturus baileyi) (E)
- Chucky madtom (Noturus crypticus) (E)
- Elegant madtom (Noturus elegans)
- Saddled madtom (Noturus fasciatus) (E)
- Yellowfin madtom (Noturus flavipinnis)
- Stonecat (Noturus flavus)
- Piebald madtom (Noturus gladiator)
- Brindled madtom (Noturus miurus)
- Brown madtom (Noturus phaeus)
- Pygmy madtom (Noturus stanauli)
- Flathead catfish (Pylodictis olivaris)

== Order Esociformes (Pikes and mudminnows) ==
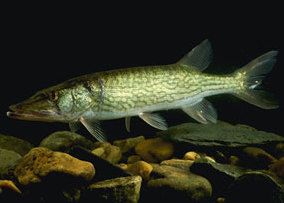
Chain pickerel

Family Esocidae (Pikes)

- American pickerel (Esox americanus)
- Northern pike (Esox lucius)
- Muskellunge (Esox masquinongy)
- Chain pickerel (Esox niger)

Family Umbridae (Mudminnows)

- Central mudminnow (Umbra limi)

== Order Salmoniformes (Salmon, trout, and whitefish) ==
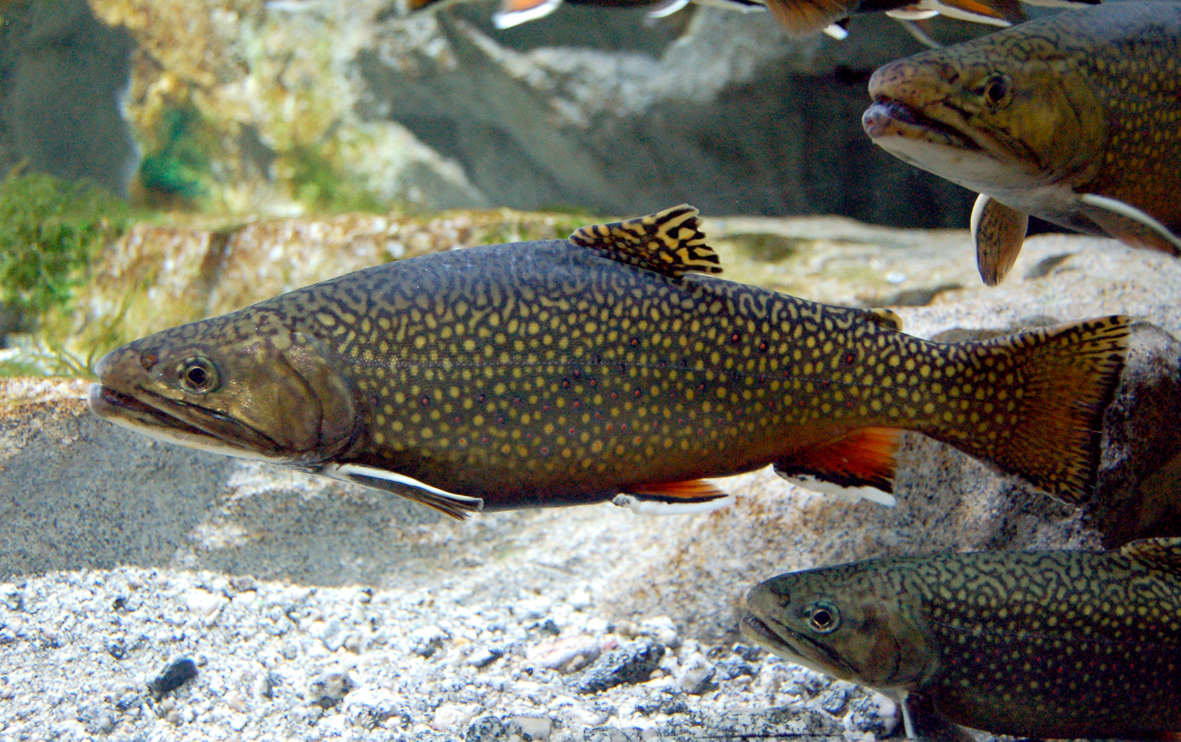
Brook trout

Family Salmonidae (Salmons, trouts, and whitefishes)

- Rainbow trout (Oncorhynchus mykiss)
- Cutthroat trout (Oncorhynchus virginalis) (I)
- Brown trout (Salmo trutta) (I)
- Brook trout (Salvelinus fontinalis)
- Lake trout (Salvelinus namaycush) (I)

== Order Percopsiformes (Trout-perches) ==
Family Amblyopsidae (Cavefishes)

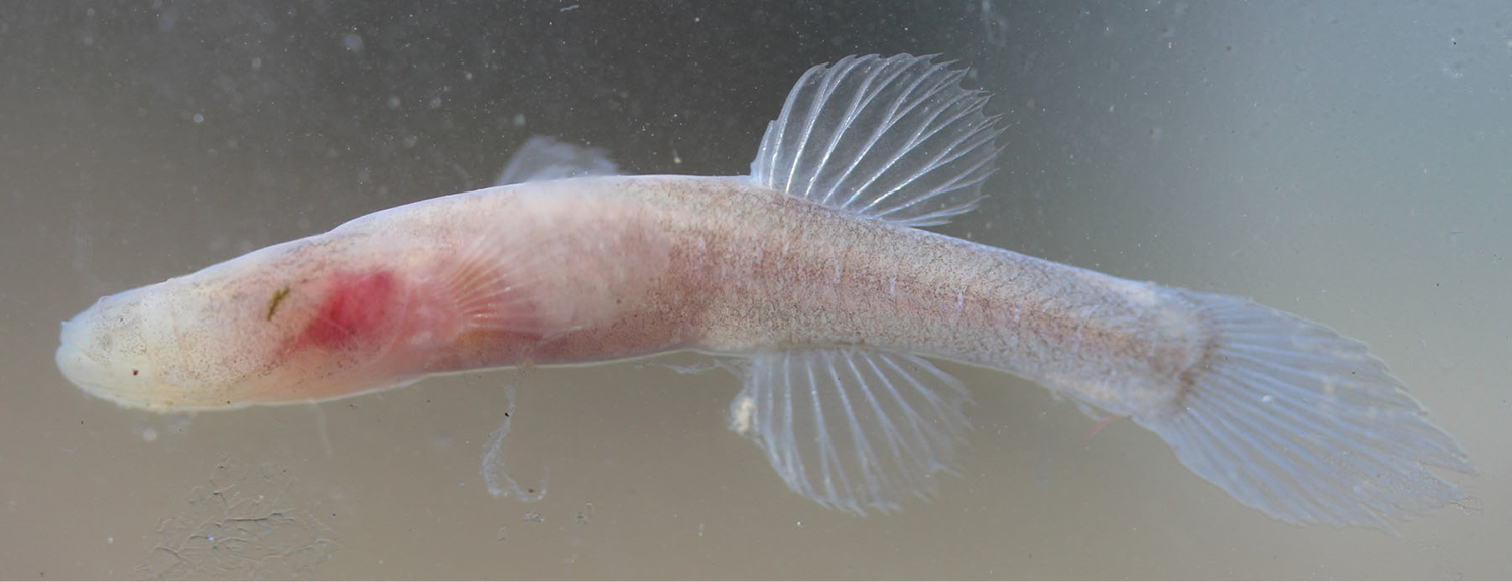
Southern cavefish

- Spring cavefish (Forbesichthys agassizii)
- Southern cavefish (Typhlichthys subterraneus)

Family Aphredoderidae (Pirate perches)

- Pirate perch (Aphredoderus gibbosus)

Family Percopsidae (Trout-perches)

- Trout-perch (Percopsis omiscomaycus)

== Order Cyprinodontiformes (Toothcarps) ==
Family Fundulidae (Topminnows)

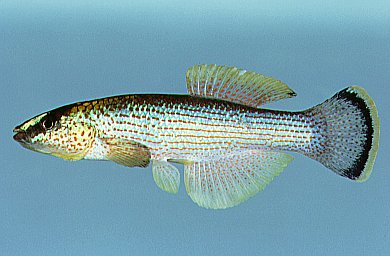
Northern studfish

- Western starhead topminnow (Fundulus blairae)
- Northern studfish (Fundulus catenatus)
- Golden topminnow (Fundulus chrysotus)
- Barrens topminnow (Fundulus julisia)
- Blackstripe topminnow (Fundulus notatus)
- Southern studfish (Fundulus stellifer)

== Order Atheriniformes (Silversides) ==
Family Atherinopsidae (Neotropical silversides)

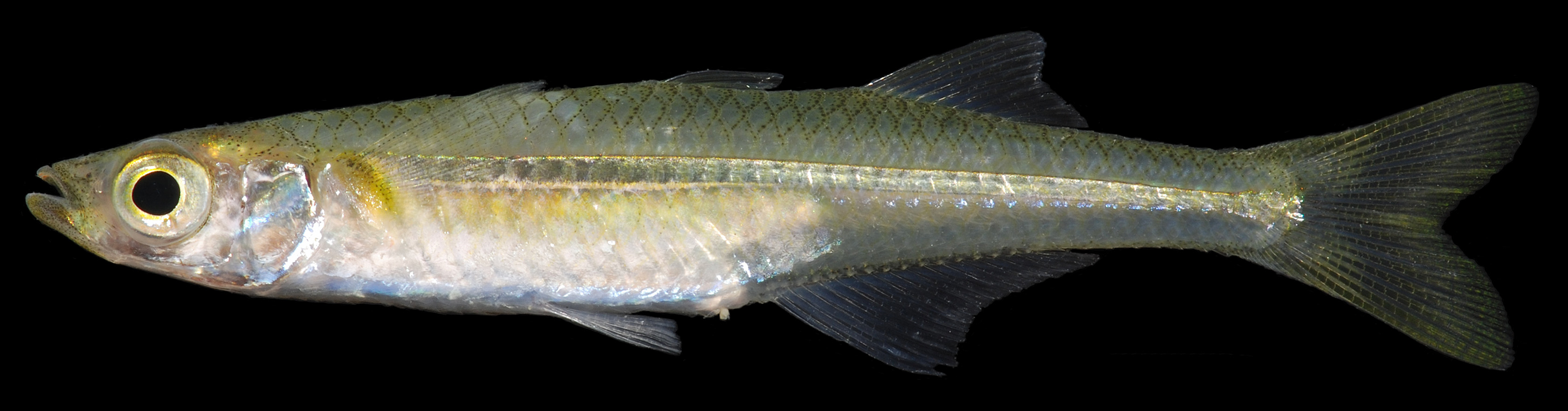
Inland silverside

- Brook silverside (Labidesthes sicculus)
- Mississippi silverside (Menidia audens)
- Inland silverside (Menidia beryllina)

== Order Scorpaeniformes (Mail-cheeked fishes) ==
Family Cottidae (Sculpins)

- Black sculpin (Cottus baileyi)
- Mottled sculpin (Cottus bairdii)
- Banded sculpin (Cottus carolinae)

== Order Perciformes (Perch-like fish) ==
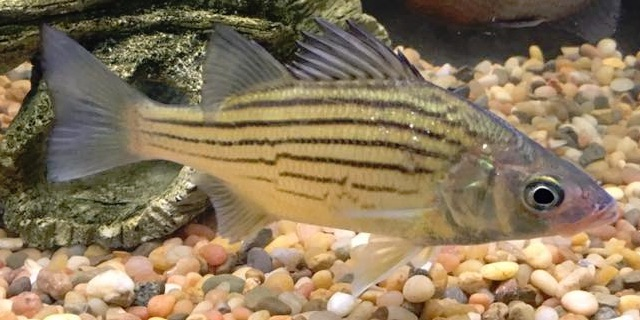
Yellow bass

Family Moronidae (Temperate basses)

- White bass (Morone chrysops)
- Yellow bass (Morone mississippiensis)
- Striped bass (Morone saxatilis)

Family Centrarchidae (Sunfishes)

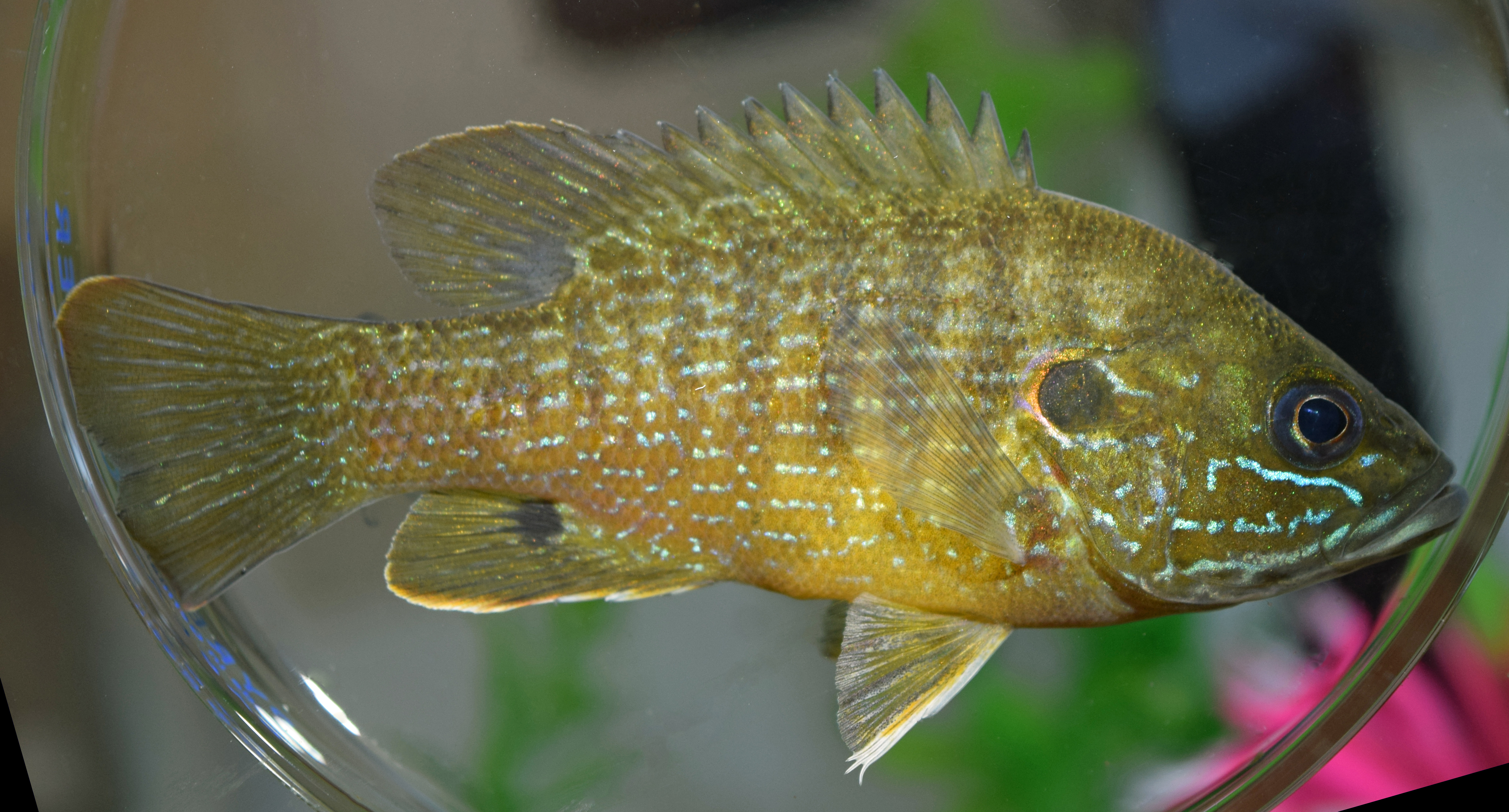
Green sunfish

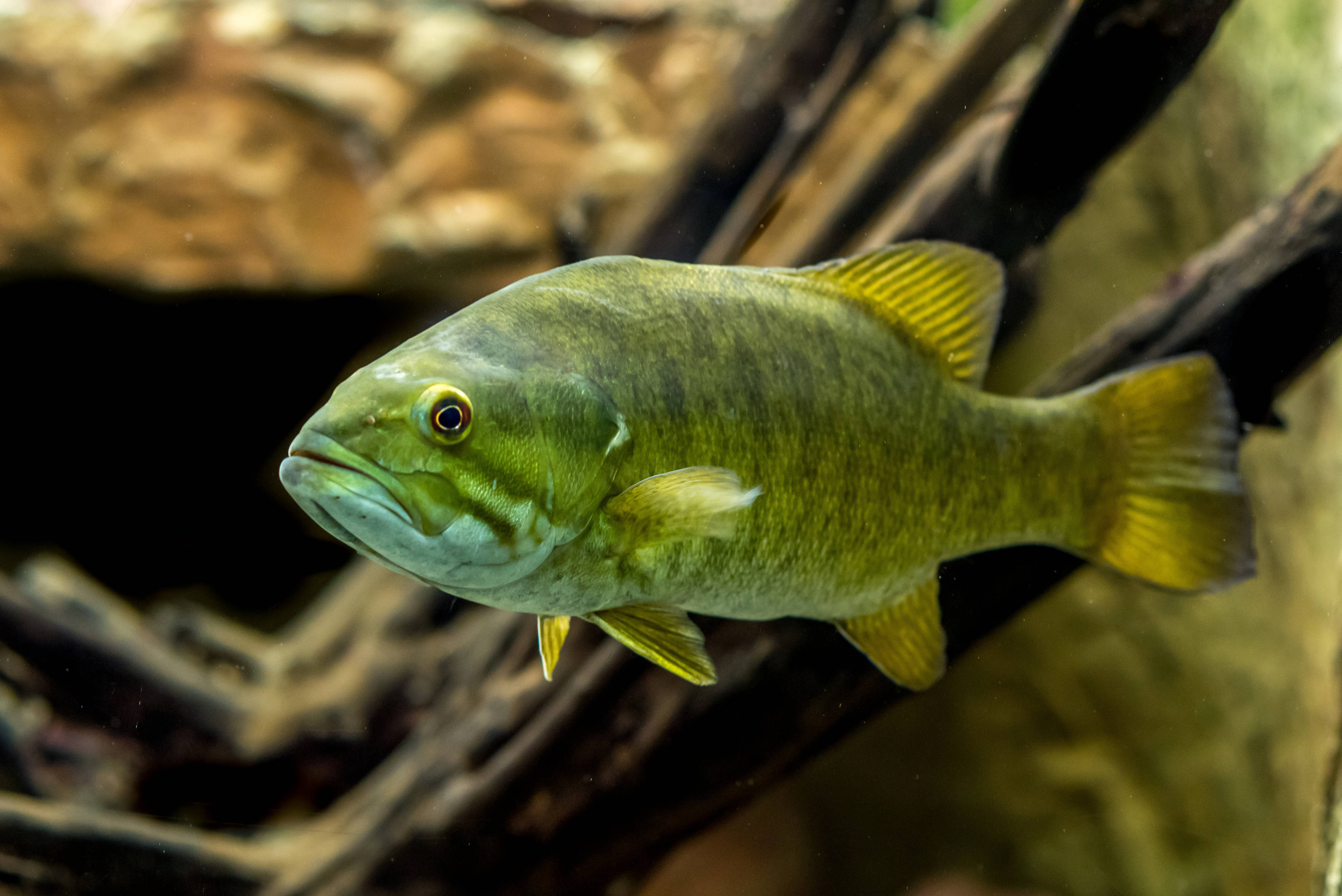
The Smallmouth bass is the state fish of Tennessee

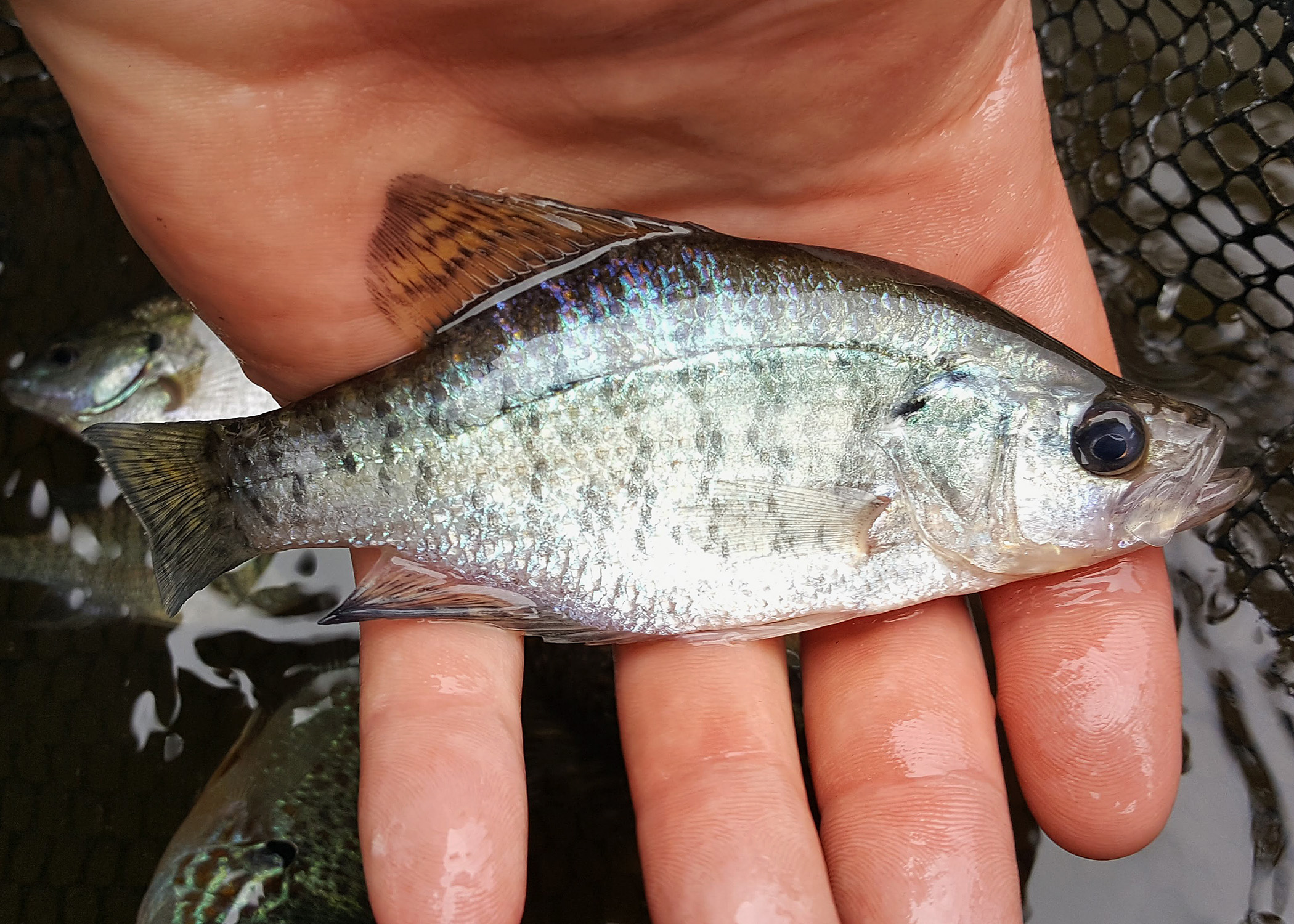
White crappie

- Shadow bass (Ambloplites ariommus)
- Rock bass (Ambloplites rupestris)
- Flier (Centrarchus macropterus)
- Redbreast sunfish (Lepomis auritus)
- Green sunfish (Lepomis cyanellus)
- Warmouth (Lepomis gulosus)
- Orangespotted sunfish (Lepomis humilis)
- Bluegill (Lepomis macrochirus)
- Dollar sunfish (Lepomis marginatus)
- Longear sunfish (Lepomis megalotis)
- Redear sunfish (Lepomis microlophus)
- Redspotted sunfish (Lepomis miniatus)
- Spotted sunfish (Lepomis punctatus)
- Swampland longear sunfish (Lepomis solis)
- Bantam sunfish (Lepomis symmetricus)
- Redeye bass (Micropterus coosae) (I)
- Smallmouth bass (Micropterus dolomieu)
- Alabama bass (Micropterus henshalli) (I)
- Largemouth bass (Micropterus nigricans)
- Spotted bass (Micropterus punctulatus)
- White crappie (Pomoxis annularis)
- Black crappie (Pomoxis nigromaculatus)

Family Percidae (perch & darters)

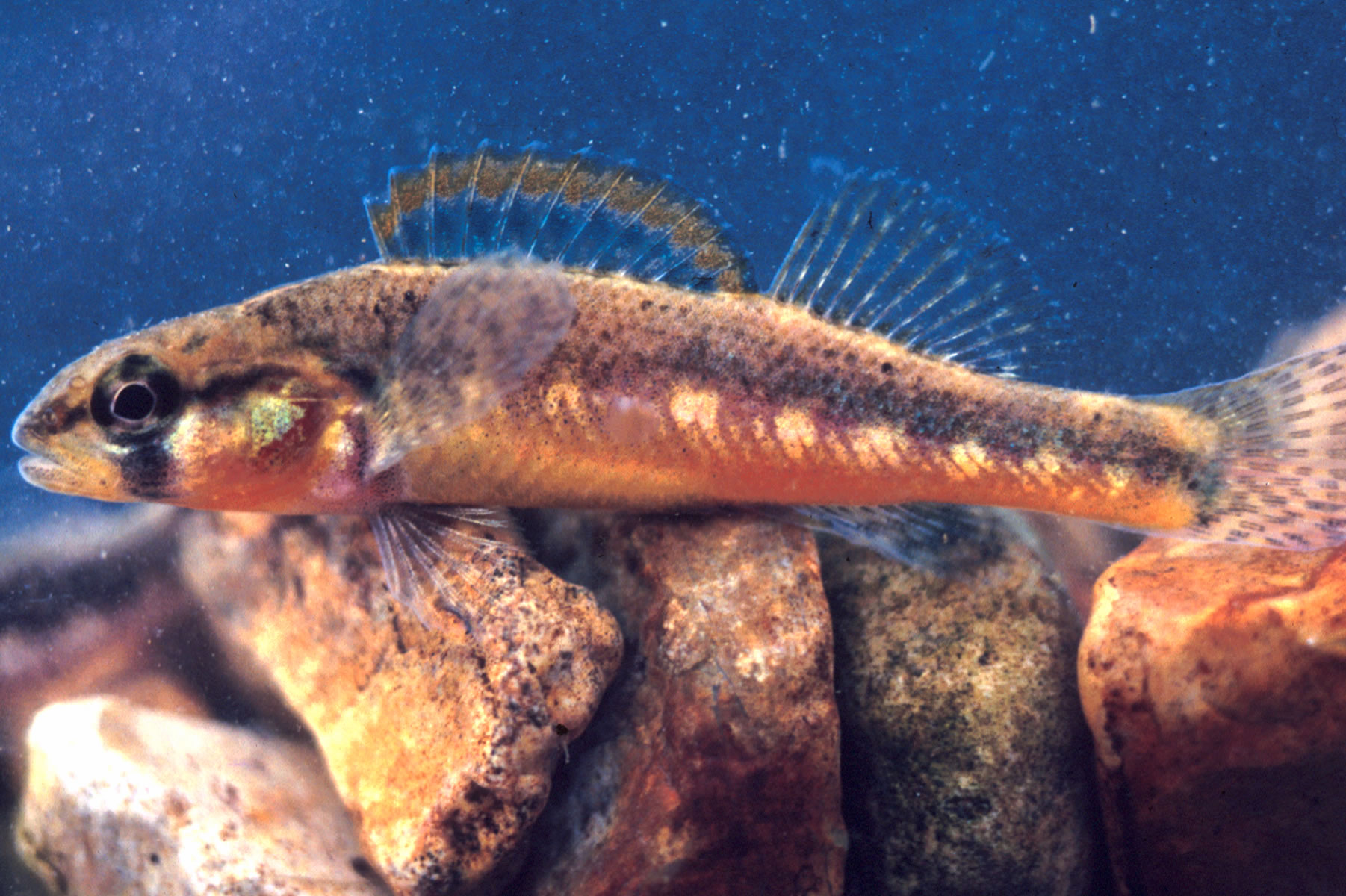
Slackwater darter

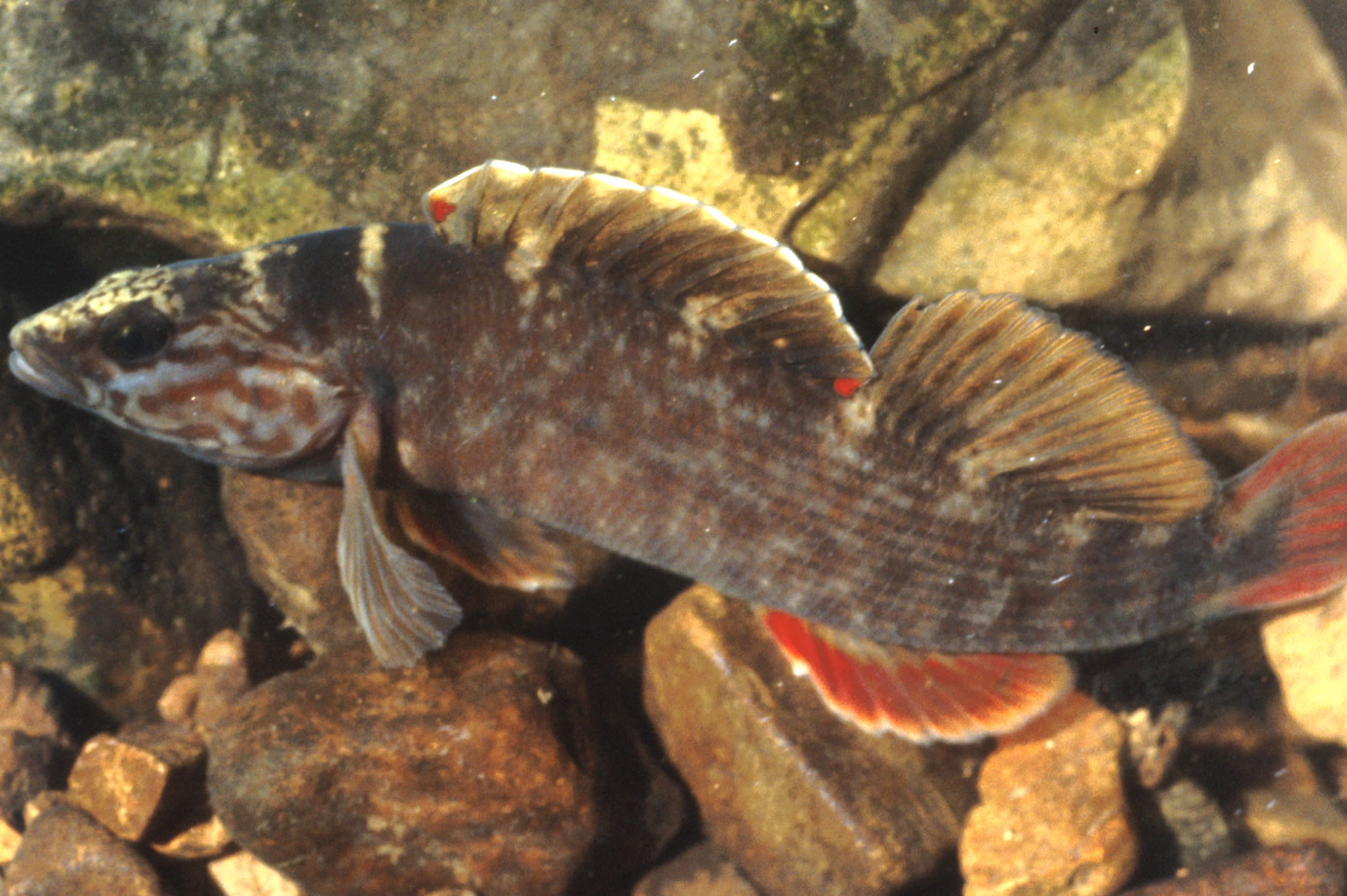
the Coppercheek darter is endemic to Tennessee

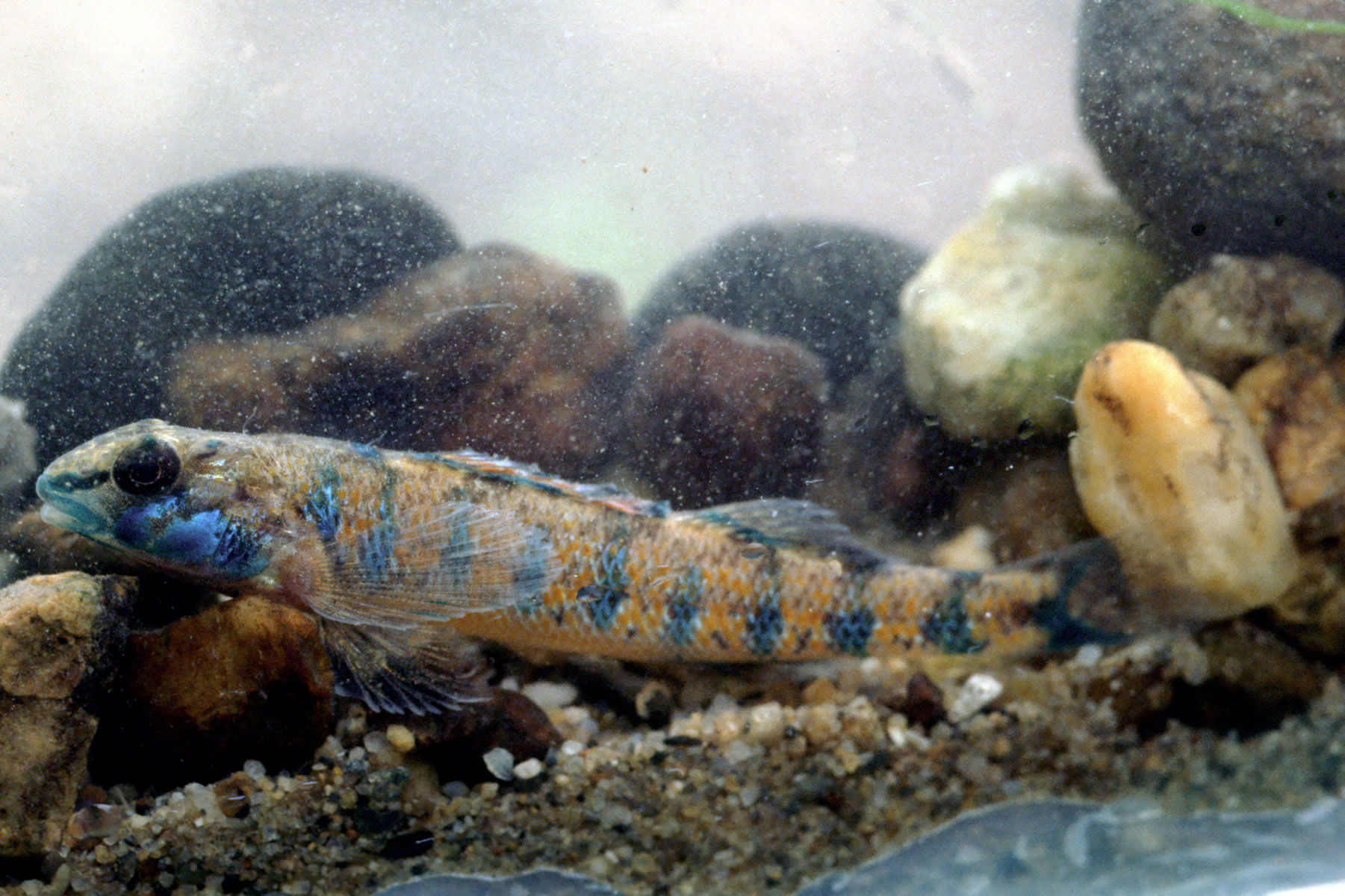
Speckled darter

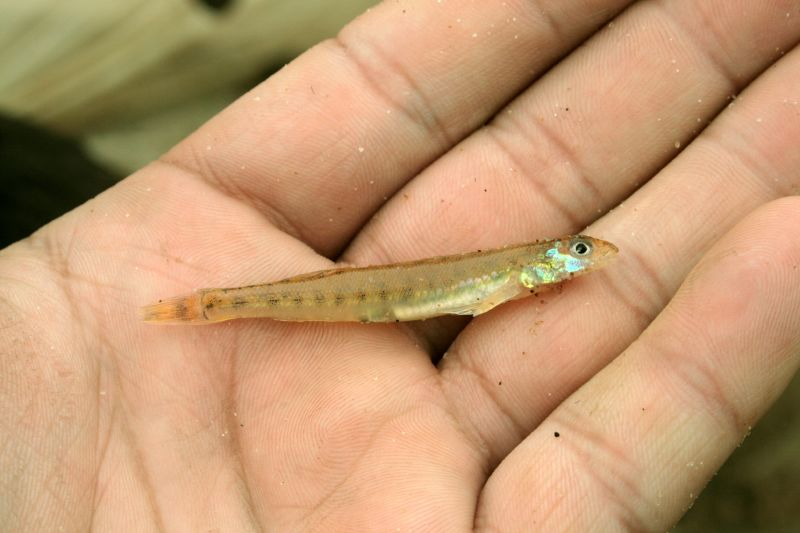
Scaly sand darter

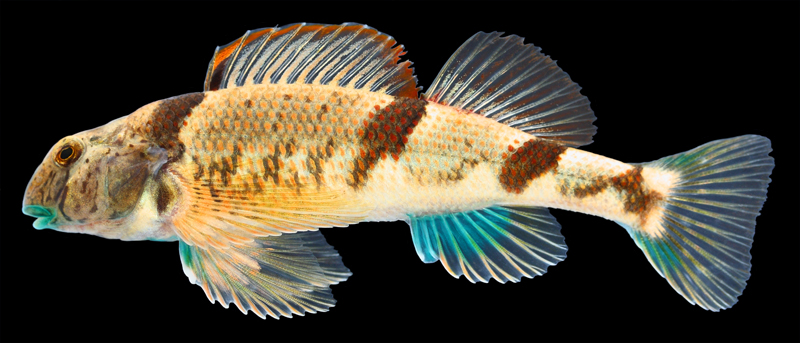
Blenny darter

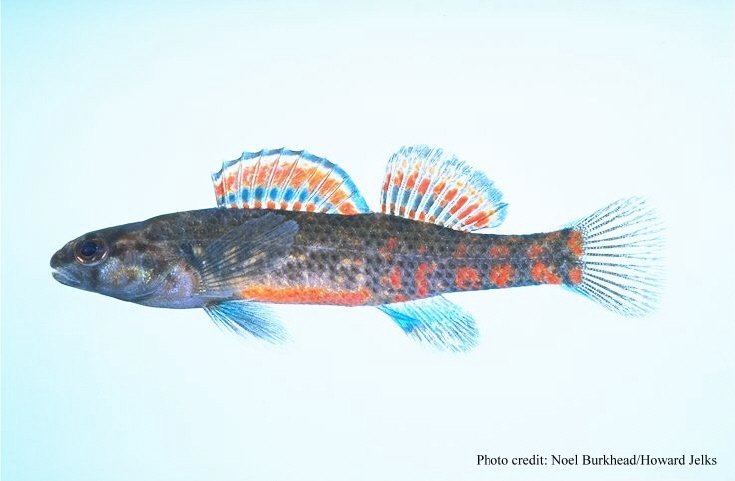
Gulf darter

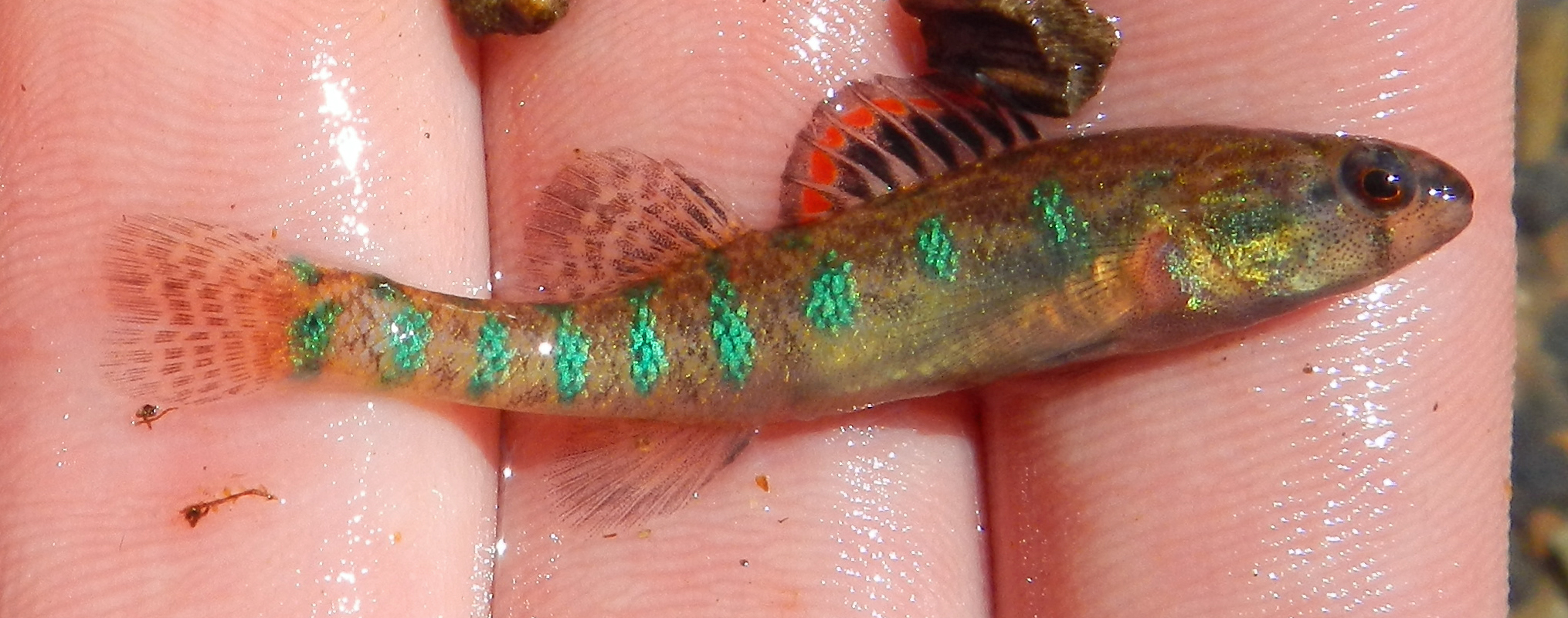
Slough darter

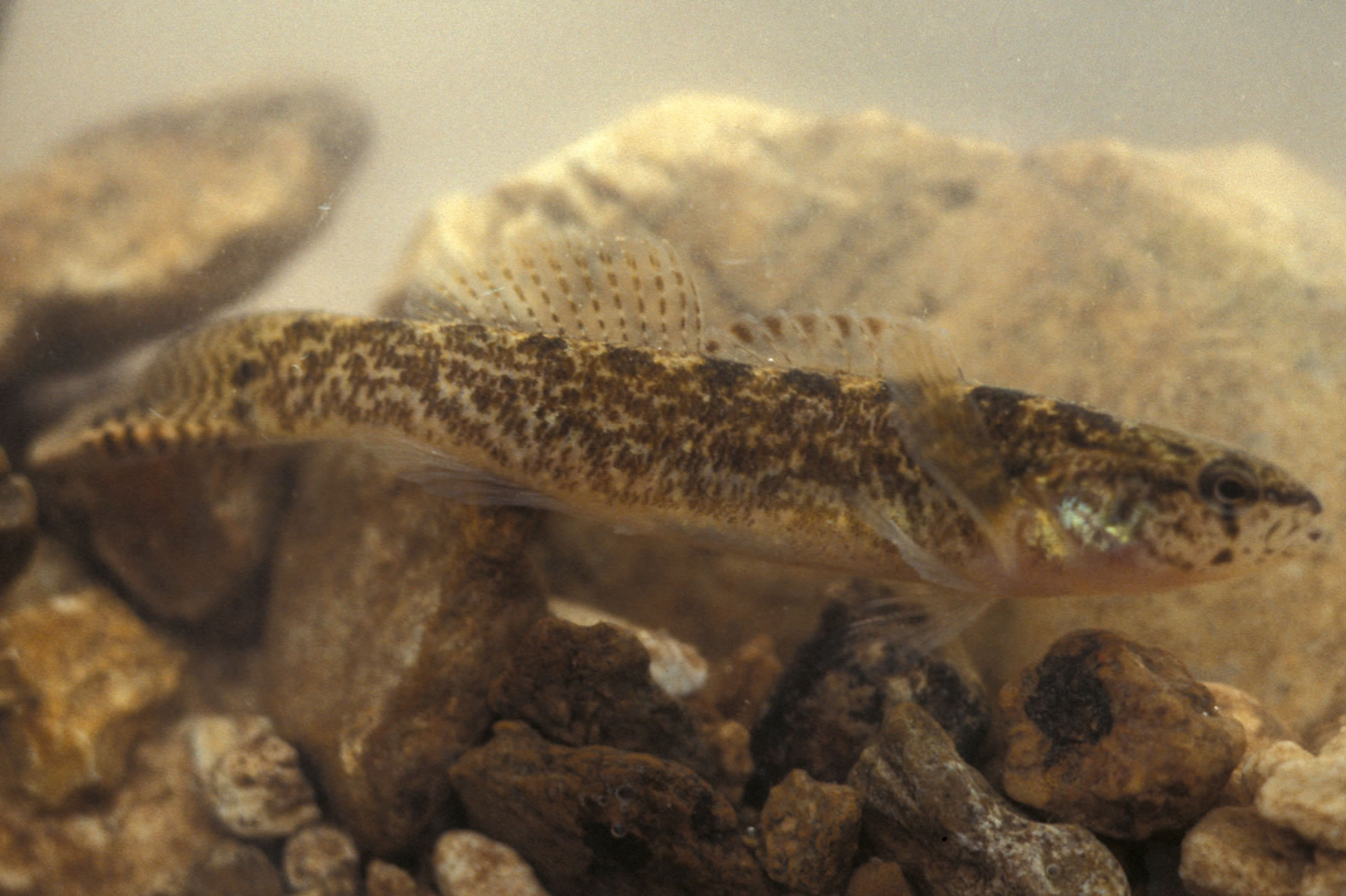
The Barrens darter is endemic to Tennessee

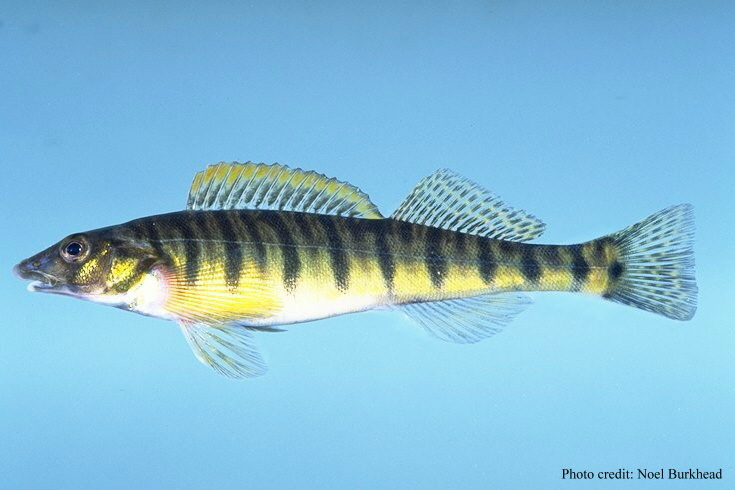
Mobile logperch

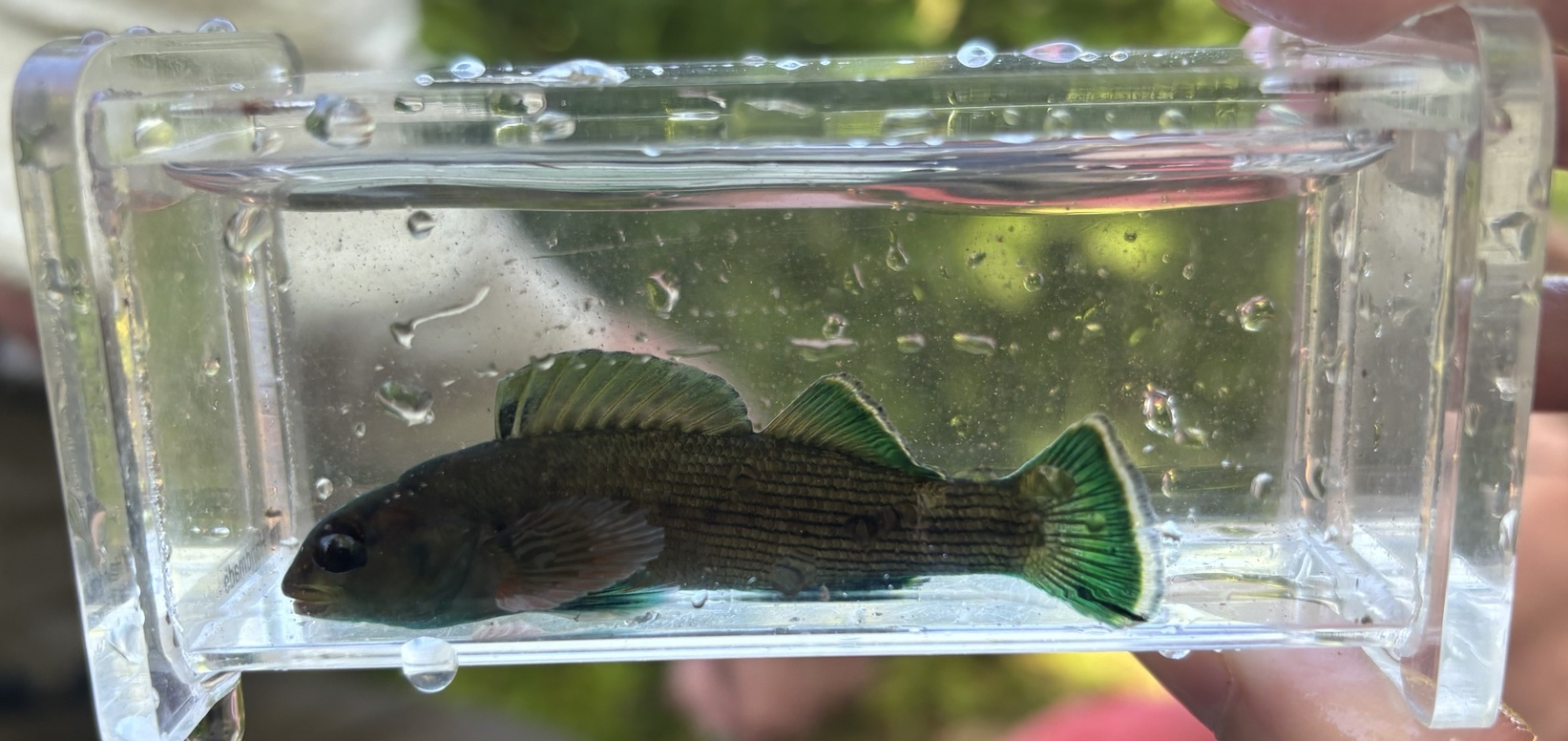
Greenfin darter

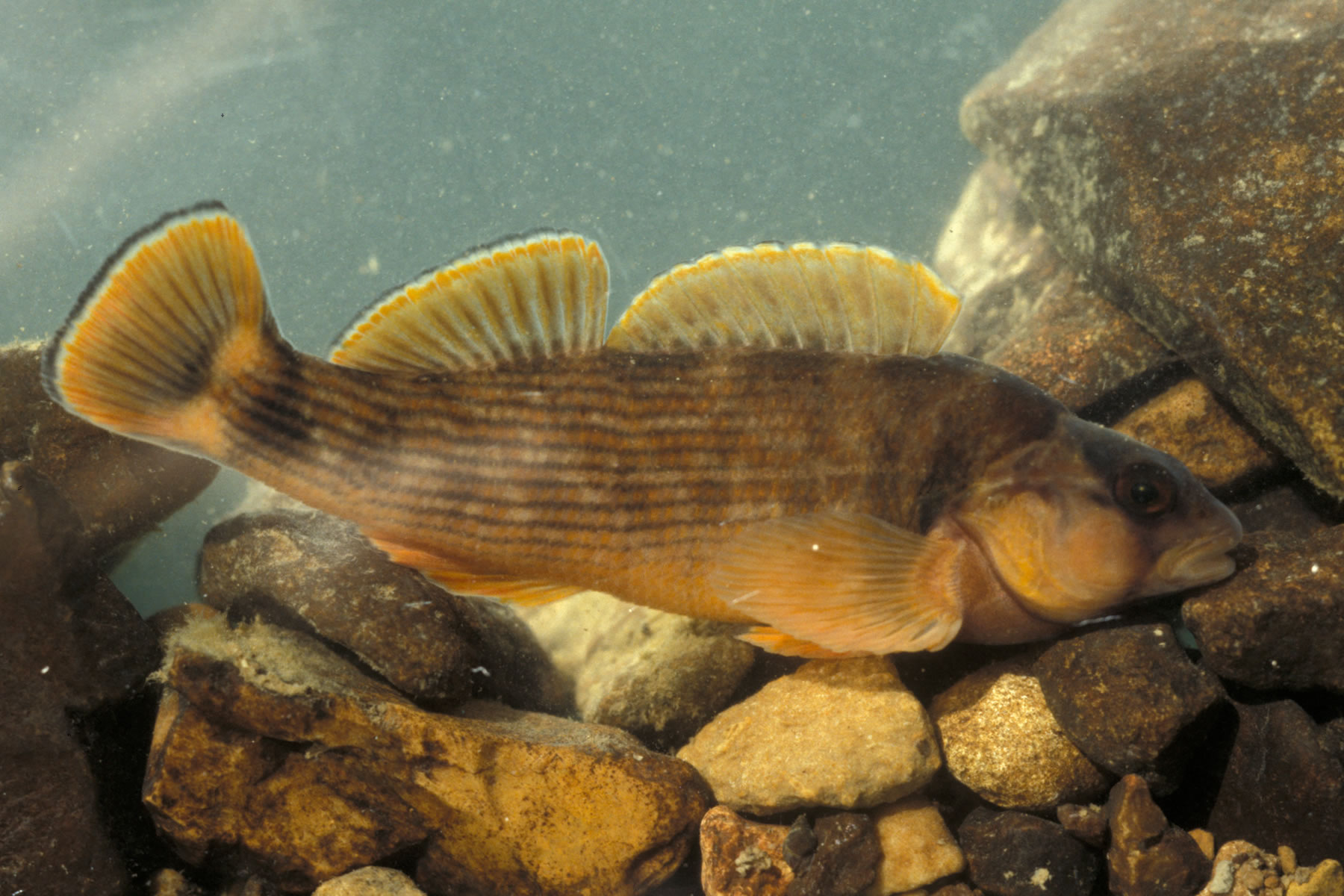
Orangefin darter

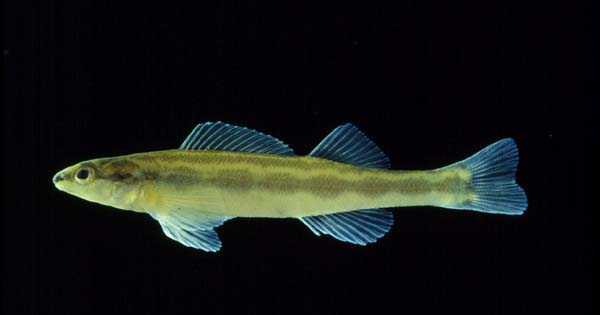
Goldline darter

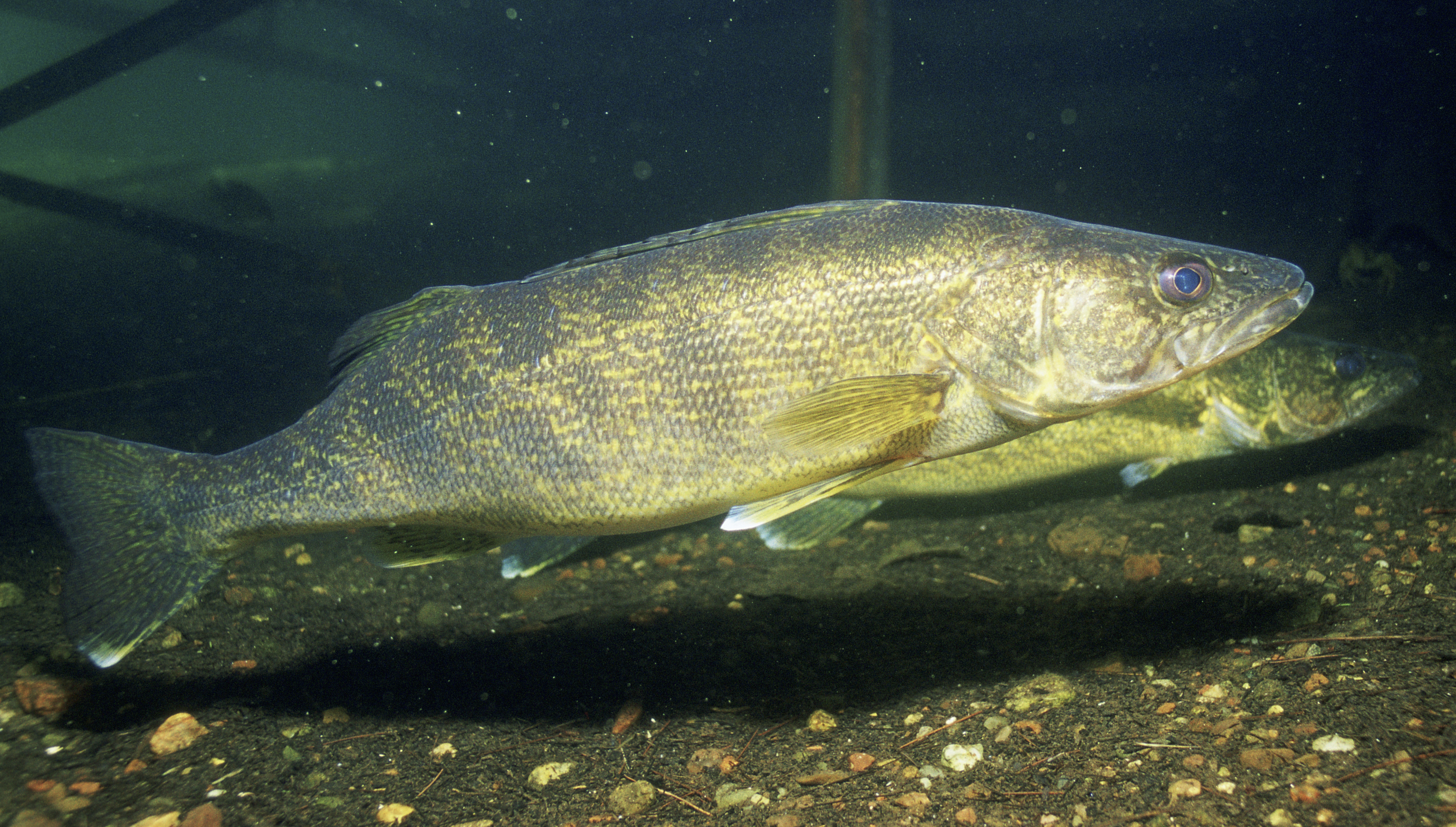
Walleye

- Ashy darter (Allohistium cinereum)
- Naked sand darter (Ammocrypta beanii)
- Eastern sand darter (Ammocrypta pellucida)
- Scaly sand darter (Ammocrypta vivax)
- Bluemask darter (Etheostoma akatulo)
- Mud darter (Etheostoma asprigene)
- Splendid darter (Etheostoma barrenense)
- Corrugated darter (Etheostoma basilare) (E)
- Buffalo darter (Etheostoma bison)
- Greenside darter (Etheostoma blennioides)
- Blenny darter (Etheostoma blennius)
- Slackwater darter (Etheostoma boschungi)
- Holiday darter (Etheostoma brevirostrum)
- Rainbow darter (Etheostoma caeruleum)
- Chickasaw darter (Etheostoma cervus) (E)
- Bluntnose darter (Etheostoma chlorosoma)
- Ashy darter (Etheostoma cinereum)
- Coosa darter (Etheostoma coosae)
- Crown darter (Etheostoma corona)
- Fringed darter (Etheostoma crossopterum)
- Moonbow darter (Etheostoma cumberlandicum)
- Stone darter (Etheostoma derivativum)
- Coldwater darter (Etheostoma ditrema)
- Blackside snubnose darter (Etheostoma duryi)
- Cherry darter (Etheostoma etnieri)) (E)
- Fantail darter (Etheostoma flabellare)
- Saffron darter (Etheostoma flavum)
- Barrens darter (Etheostoma forbesi) (E)
- Swamp darter (Etheostoma fusiforme)
- Warioto darter (Etheostoma gore)
- Slough darter (Etheostoma gracile)
- Harlequin darter (Etheostoma histrio)
- Blueside darter (Etheostoma jessiae)
- Highland Rim darter (Etheostoma kantuckeense)
- Stripetail darter (Etheostoma kennicotti)
- Headwater darter (Etheostoma lawrencei)
- Redband darter (Etheostoma luteovinctum)) (E)
- Brighteye darter (Etheostoma lynceum)
- Lollipop darter (Etheostoma neopterum)
- Blackfin darter (Etheostoma nigripinne)
- Johnny darter (Etheostoma nigrum)
- Spangled darter (Etheostoma obama) (E)
- Barcheek darter (Etheostoma obeyense)
- Dirty darter (Etheostoma olivaceum) (E)
- Guardian darter (Etheostoma oophylax)
- East Rim darter (Etheostoma orientale)
- Goldstripe darter (Etheostoma parvipinne)
- Duck darter (Etheostoma planasaxatile) (E)
- Cypress darter (Etheostoma proeliare)
- Egg-mimic darter (Etheostoma pseudovulatum) (E)
- Firebelly darter (Etheostoma pyrrhogaster)
- Bayou darter (Etheostoma rubrum)
- Rock darter (Etheostoma rupestre)
- Cumberland arrow darter (Etheostoma sagitta)
- Tennessee snubnose darter (Etheostoma simoterum)
- Citico darter (Etheostoma sitikuense) (E)
- Slabrock darter (Etheostoma smithi)
- Orangethroat darter (Etheostoma spectabile)
- Speckled darter (Etheostoma stigmaeum))
- Striated darter (Etheostoma striatulum) (E)
- Cumberland darter (Etheostoma susanae)
- Spottail darter (Etheostoma squamiceps)
- Gulf darter (Etheostoma swaini)
- Swannanoa darter (Etheostoma swannanoa)
- Tippecanoe darter (Etheostoma tippecanoe)
- Trispot darter (Etheostoma trisella)
- Tuscumbia darter (Etheostoma tuscumbia)
- Wounded darter (Etheostoma vulneratum)
- Boulder darter (Etheostoma wapiti)
- Banded darter (Etheostoma zonale)
- Bandfin darter (Etheostoma zonistium)
- Sharphead darter (Nothonotus acuticeps)
- Coppercheek darter (Nothonotus aquali) (E)
- Orangefin darter (Nothonotus bellus)
- Bluebreast darter (Nothonotus camurus)
- Greenfin darter (Nothonotus chlorobranchius)
- Golden darter (Nothonotus denoncourti)
- Greenbreast darter (Nothonotus jordani)
- Smallscale darter (Nothonotus microlepidus)
- Redline darter (Nothonotus rufilineatus)
- Bloodfin darter (Nothonotus sanguifluus)
- Caney Fork darter (Nothonotus starnesi) (E)
- Yellow perch (Perca flavescens)
- Amber darter (Percina antesella)
- Tennessee logperch (Percina apina) (E)
- Tangerine darter (Percina aurantiaca)
- Goldline darter (Percina aurolineata)
- Blotchside logperch (Percina burtoni)
- Common logperch (Percina caprodes)
- Channel darter (Percina copelandi)
- Gilt darter (Percina evides)
- Mobile logperch (Percina kathae)
- Bridled darter (Percina kusha)
- Bronze darter (Percina palmaris)
- Dusky darter (Percina sciera)
- River darter (Percina shumardi)
- Olive darter (Percina squamata)
- Snail darter (Percina tanasi)
- Saddleback darter (Percina vigil)
- Sickle darter (Percina williamsi)
- Sauger (Sander canadensis)
- Walleye (Sander vitreus)

Family Sciaenidae (drums)

- Freshwater drum (Aplodinotus grunniens)

== See also ==
- List of birds of Tennessee
