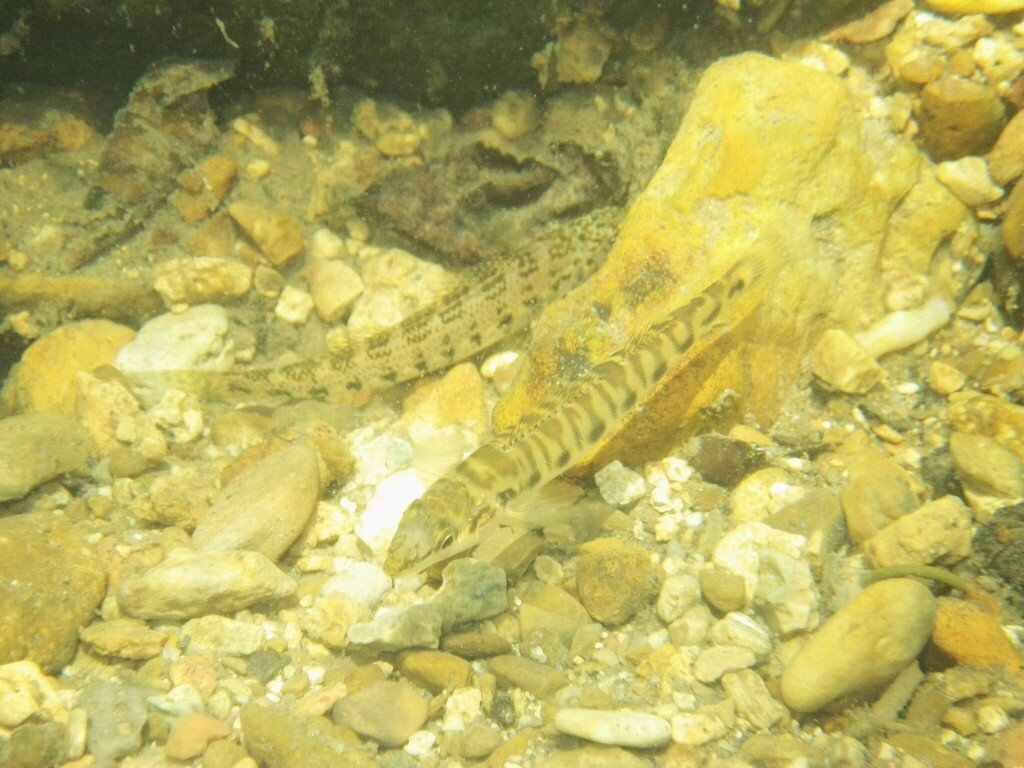

Scientific classification
- Kingdom: Animalia
- Phylum: Chordata
- Class: Actinopterygii
- Order: Perciformes
- Family: Percidae
- Genus: Percina
- Species: P. apina

Binomial name
- Percina apina Simmons, 2017

= Tennessee logperch =

Species of fish

The Tennessee logperch (Percina apina) is a freshwater fish in the perch family found in the Duck River and White Oak Creek in Middle Tennessee. The fish was first identified in 1971 as the Blotchside Logperch (Percina burtoni), but was found to be its own species in 2006.

== Description ==
The fish primarily varies from the Blotchside Logperch in its average scale count and pigmentation. Percina apina has a larger average number of lateral line scales and transverse scales. The pigmented spots along the Tennessee Logperch are on average wider and shorter than the spots on the Blotchside Logperch.
