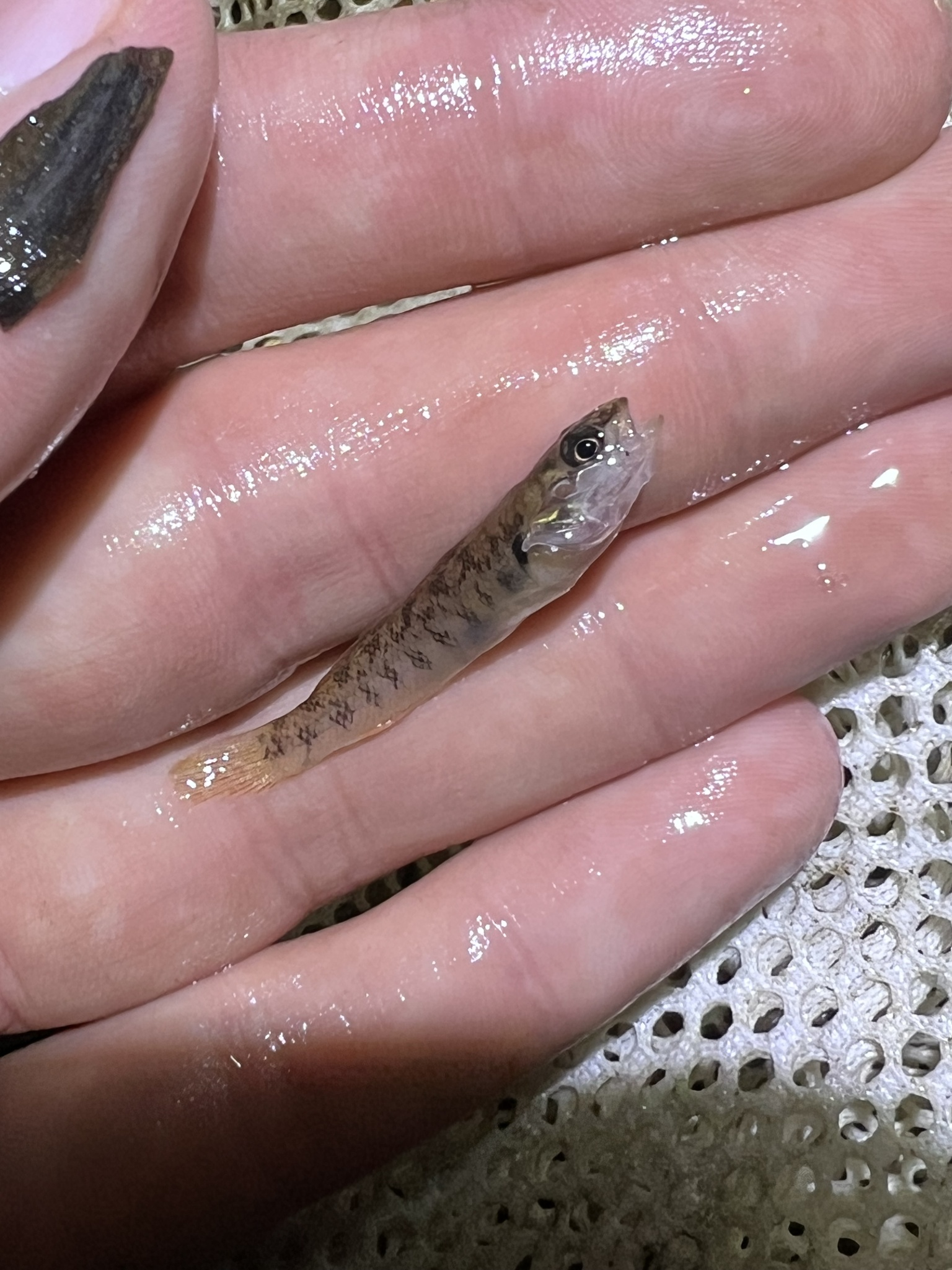

Conservation status
- Least Concern (IUCN 3.1)

Scientific classification
- Kingdom: Animalia
- Phylum: Chordata
- Class: Actinopterygii
- Order: Perciformes
- Family: Percidae
- Genus: Etheostoma
- Species: E. smithi

Binomial name
- Etheostoma smithi Page & Braasch, 1976

= Slabrock darter =

Species of fish

The slabrock darter (Etheostoma smithi) is a species of freshwater ray-finned fish, a darter from the subfamily Etheostomatinae, part of the family Percidae, which also contains the perches, ruffes and pikeperches. It is endemic to the eastern United States. It occurs in the drainages of the lower Cumberland River and the lower Tennessee River in the states of Kentucky and Tennessee. It inhabits rocky pools in smaller rivers and streams, and along the rocky margins of larger streams and bodies of water. This species preys on insect larvae and extremely small crustaceans. It can reach a length of 6.2 centimetres (2.4 in) TL though most only reach about 4.1 centimetres (1.6 in). The specific name honors the vertebrate zoologist, Dr. Philip Wayne Smith (1921–1986).
