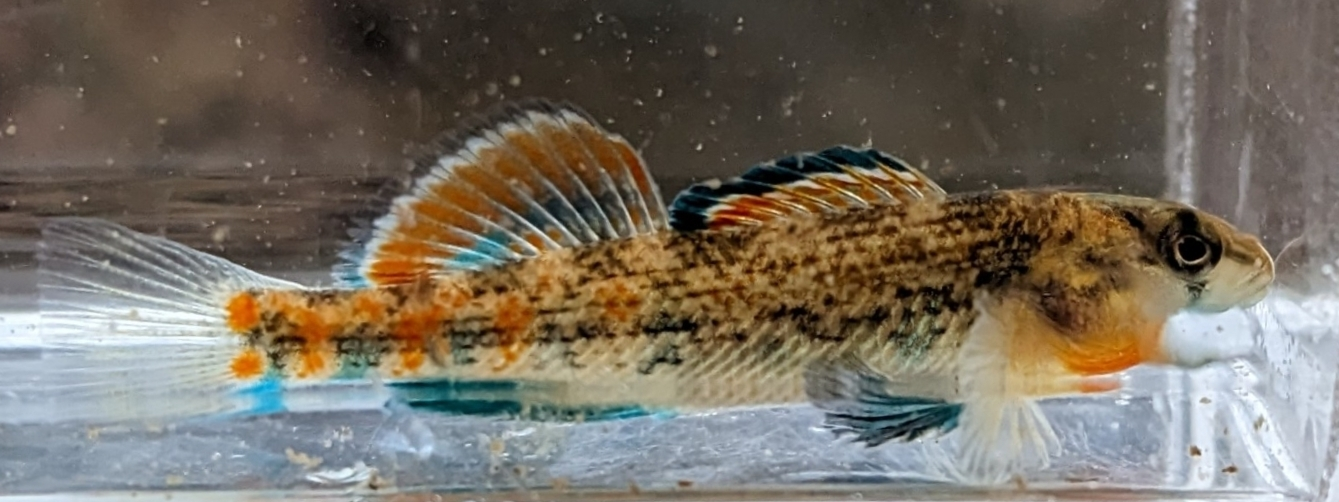
- In Tennessee

Conservation status
- Least Concern (IUCN 3.1)

- Apparently Secure (NatureServe)

Scientific classification
- Kingdom: Animalia
- Phylum: Chordata
- Class: Actinopterygii
- Order: Perciformes
- Family: Percidae
- Genus: Etheostoma
- Species: E. bison

Binomial name
- Etheostoma bison Ceas & Page, 1997

= Buffalo darter =

Species of fish

The buffalo darter (Etheostoma bison) is a species of freshwater ray-finned fish, a darter from the subfamily Etheostomatinae, part of the family Percidae, which also contains the perches, ruffes and pikeperches. It is found in the tributaries of the lower Duck and lower Tennessee Rivers. It is distinguished from other darter species by the presence of eight anal rays, as well breeding males having a unique hump behind the head reminiscent of a buffalo.

== Geographic distribution ==
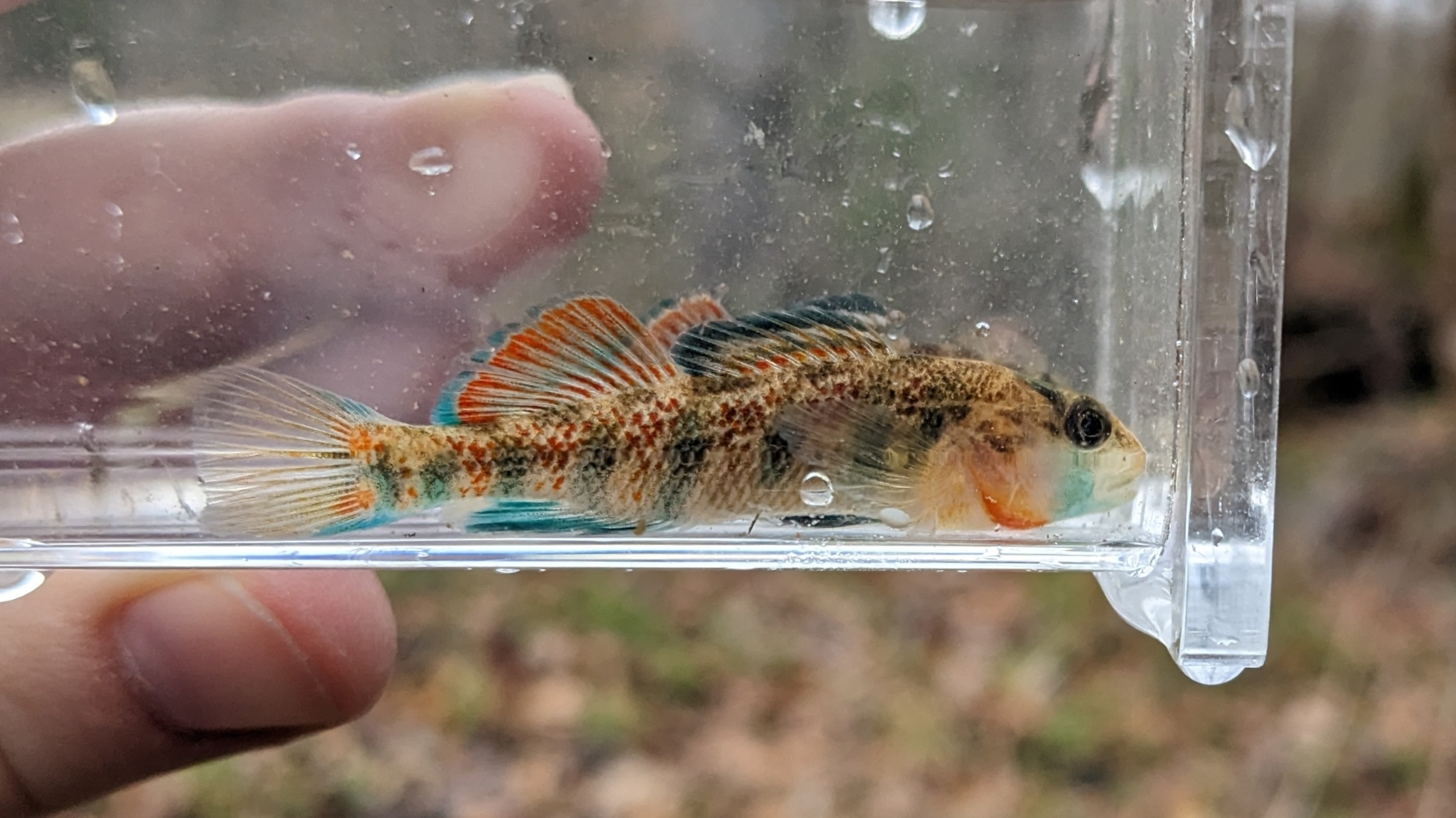
In Tennessee

E. bison is found in a very small range of tributaries in Tennessee, although a population survey has not been done to assess the actual range of these species specifically. The current distribution of this species is only known to be in the tributaries of the lower Duck and Tennessee Rivers. This small area of habitats and limited sightings could be due to these fish evolving to inhabit smaller, less connected areas of these rivers, or it could be due to human disturbances, such as erosion and dam building.

== Ecology ==
A dearth of literature exists on the ecology of these species explicitly, but based on similar darter ecology, as well as the slightly subterminal present mouth on the fish, they probably rest near the bottom on the creeks and rivers they inhabit. In the areas where they have been found, these darters are generally small in size and occupy the benthic zone of various freshwater habitats, including the riffles, pools, and runs of small to large streams. These fish most likely eat a diet similar to other darters, which is made up of insects and their larvae, copepods, and other small aquatic organisms. Because these fish live and hunt on the beds of smaller streams and tributaries, destruction/ defilement of these habitats could reduce populations of these species.

== Life history ==
Due to the lack of research on buffalo darter life history ecology, inferences will be made based on closely related darter species found in similar habitats. Darters usually mate in the spring, with active mating occurring from early spring to early summer. Clutch sizes can vary from a few eggs to 2000 or more eggs per brood created by multiple females. Darters use nesting rocks to lay their eggs, and can either be in shallow or deep rushing water. A marked trend of male parental care exists in darters, with males keeping close to the eggs for protection. E. bison most likely has a lifespan to similar to other darters, which is typically a few years.

== Management ==
No management plan is in place for this species, as it not listed as threatened or endangered in Tennessee or federally. Because population statistics of this fish are unknown, it is hard to know the state of current populations and if they are in threat or could become so. As with any aquatic species it is important to mitigate human effects on river dynamics to reduce damage to populations. To ensure the sustainability of E. bison and other fish like it, the effects of erosion due to urbanization and agriculture and the construction of dams need to be controlled. Siltation is a huge issue for small benthic fish such as these darters' it can cause physical ailments and behavioral changes.
