= Barcheek darter =

Conservation status
- Least Concern (IUCN 3.1)

Scientific classification
- Kingdom: Animalia
- Phylum: Chordata
- Class: Actinopterygii
- Order: Perciformes
- Family: Percidae
- Genus: Etheostoma
- Species: E. obeyense

Binomial name
- Etheostoma obeyense Kirsch, 1892

Species of fish

The barcheek darter (Etheostoma obeyense) is a species of freshwater ray-finned fish, a darter from the subfamily Etheostomatinae, part of the family Percidae, which also contains the perches, ruffes and pikeperches. It is endemic to the eastern United States where it is only known to occur in the states of Kentucky and Tennessee in the Cumberland River drainage from the Big South Fork down to the Obey River. It is an inhabitant of smaller rivers, streams and creeks where it lives in small, rocky pools. This species can reach a length of 8.4 centimetres (3.3 in) TL though most only reach a length of 5 centimetres (2.0 in).
