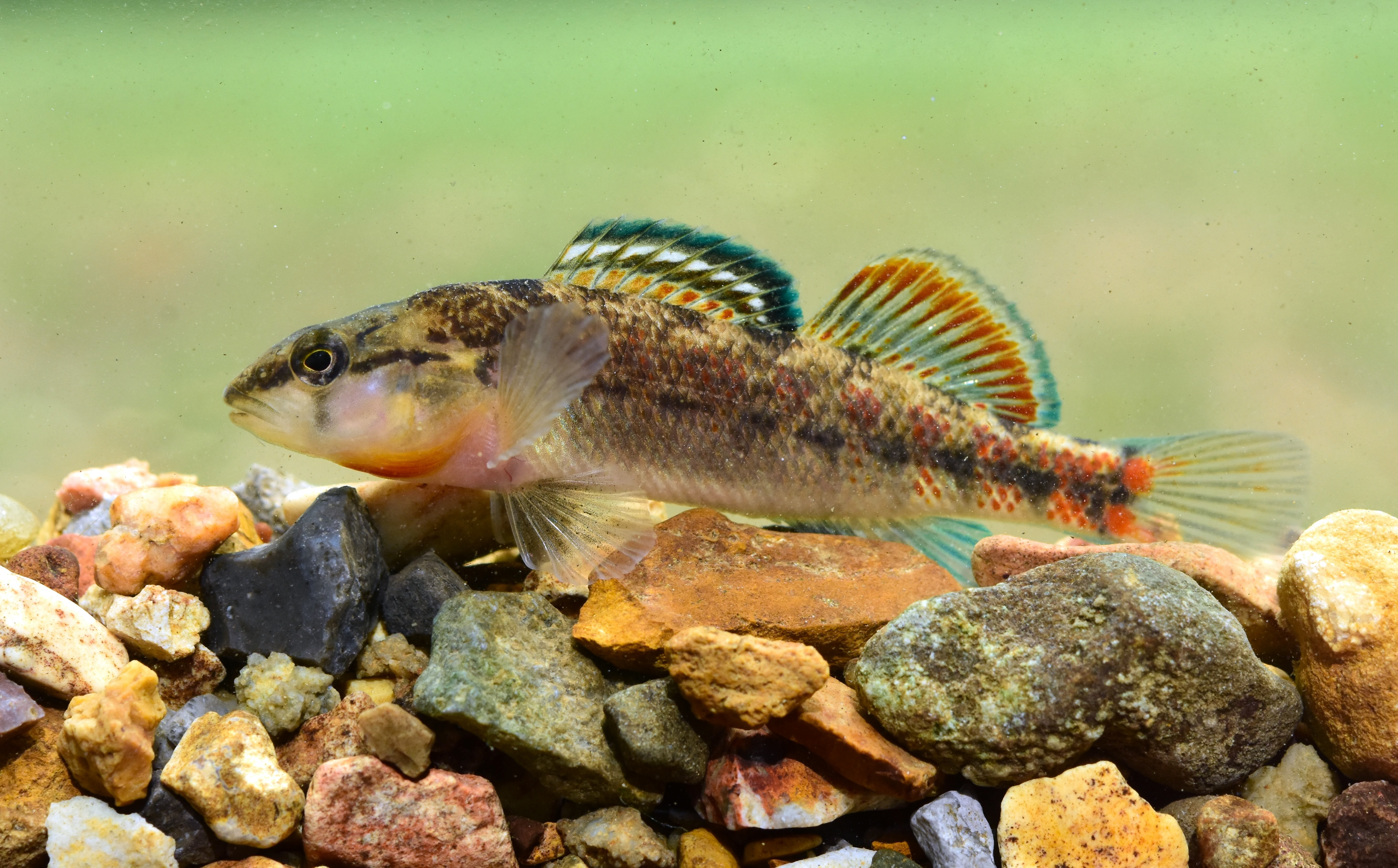

Conservation status
- Least Concern (IUCN 3.1)

Scientific classification
- Kingdom: Animalia
- Phylum: Chordata
- Class: Actinopterygii
- Division: Teleostei
- Order: Perciformes
- Family: Percidae
- Genus: Etheostoma
- Species: E. kantuckeense

Binomial name
- Etheostoma kantuckeense Ceas & Page, 1997

= Highland Rim darter =

Species of fish

The Highland Rim darter (Etheostoma kantuckeense) is a species of freshwater ray-finned fish, a darter from the subfamily Etheostomatinae, part of the family Percidae, which also contains the perches, ruffes and pikeperches. It is endemic to the eastern United States, where it is only known to occur in Tennessee and Kentucky in the Barren River system. This species can reach a length of 5.6 centimetres (2.2 in) SL.

== Identification ==
Similar to the orangethroat darter but has blue-grey breast, belly, and faint lines on side. The Highland Rim darter lacks scales on its breast.

== Habitat ==
The Highland Rim Darter can be found in shallow gravel riffles, rocky runs and pools, of headwaters creeks, and small rivers.
