= Firebelly darter =

Conservation status
- Near Threatened (IUCN 3.1)

Scientific classification
- Kingdom: Animalia
- Phylum: Chordata
- Class: Actinopterygii
- Order: Perciformes
- Family: Percidae
- Genus: Etheostoma
- Species: E. pyrrhogaster

Binomial name
- Etheostoma pyrrhogaster R. M. Bailey & Etnier, 1988

Species of fish

The firebelly darter (Etheostoma pyrrhogaster) is a species of freshwater ray-finned fish, a darter from the subfamily Etheostomatinae, part of the family Percidae, which also contains the perches, ruffes and pikeperches. It is endemic to the eastern United States, where it is only known to occur in the drainage systems of the Obion and Forked Deer rivers of Kentucky and Tennessee. It inhabits gravel or sand-bottomed pools in creeks up to small rivers. This species can reach a length of 7 centimetres (2.8 in) TL.

== Habitat ==
Firebelly darters occur in small to medium streams, and adults typically occupy the swiftest waters and coarsest substrates available. In the low gradient streams where they occur, these habitats are gentle riffles with fine gravel substrates. They often encounter them in areas with rooted aquatic vegetation, but this probably reflects a preference for clearer streams rather than the vegetation, since they are abundant in several Obion River system streams where vegetation is absent.

== Range ==
Confined to upper Coastal Plain streams of the Obion and Forked Deer river systems in Kentucky and Tennessee, where it is locally abundant in the few remaining good quality streams.
