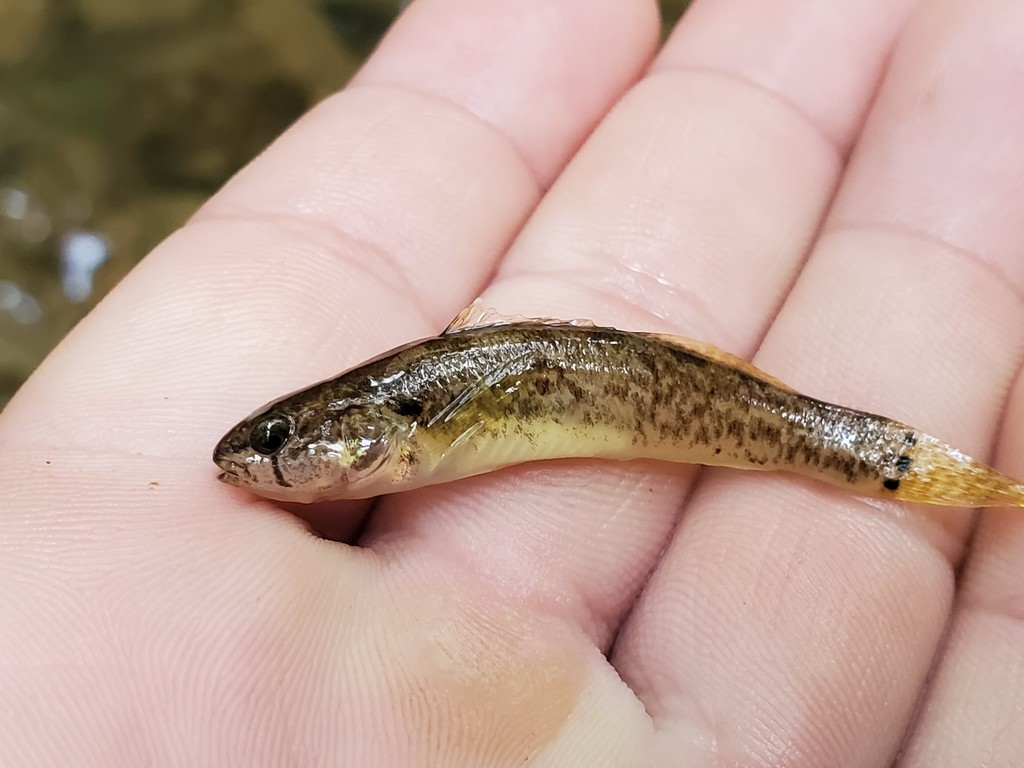

Conservation status
- Least Concern (IUCN 3.1)

Scientific classification
- Kingdom: Animalia
- Phylum: Chordata
- Class: Actinopterygii
- Order: Perciformes
- Family: Percidae
- Genus: Etheostoma
- Species: E. crossopterum

Binomial name
- Etheostoma crossopterum Braasch & Mayden, 1985

= Fringed darter =

Species of fish

The fringed darter (Etheostoma crossopterum) is a species of freshwater ray-finned fish, a darter from the subfamily Etheostomatinae, part of the family Percidae, which also contains the perches, ruffes and pikeperches. It is endemic to the eastern United States, where it occurs in the drainage of the Cumberland River, the Duck River system, the Shoal Creek system, and the tributaries of the Reelfoot Lakes of Kentucky, Tennessee, and Alabama. It is an inhabitant of small streams and rocky pool and nearby riffles where they prey on insect larvae and nymphs, as well as small crustaceans. This species can reach a length of 10 cm (3.9 in).
