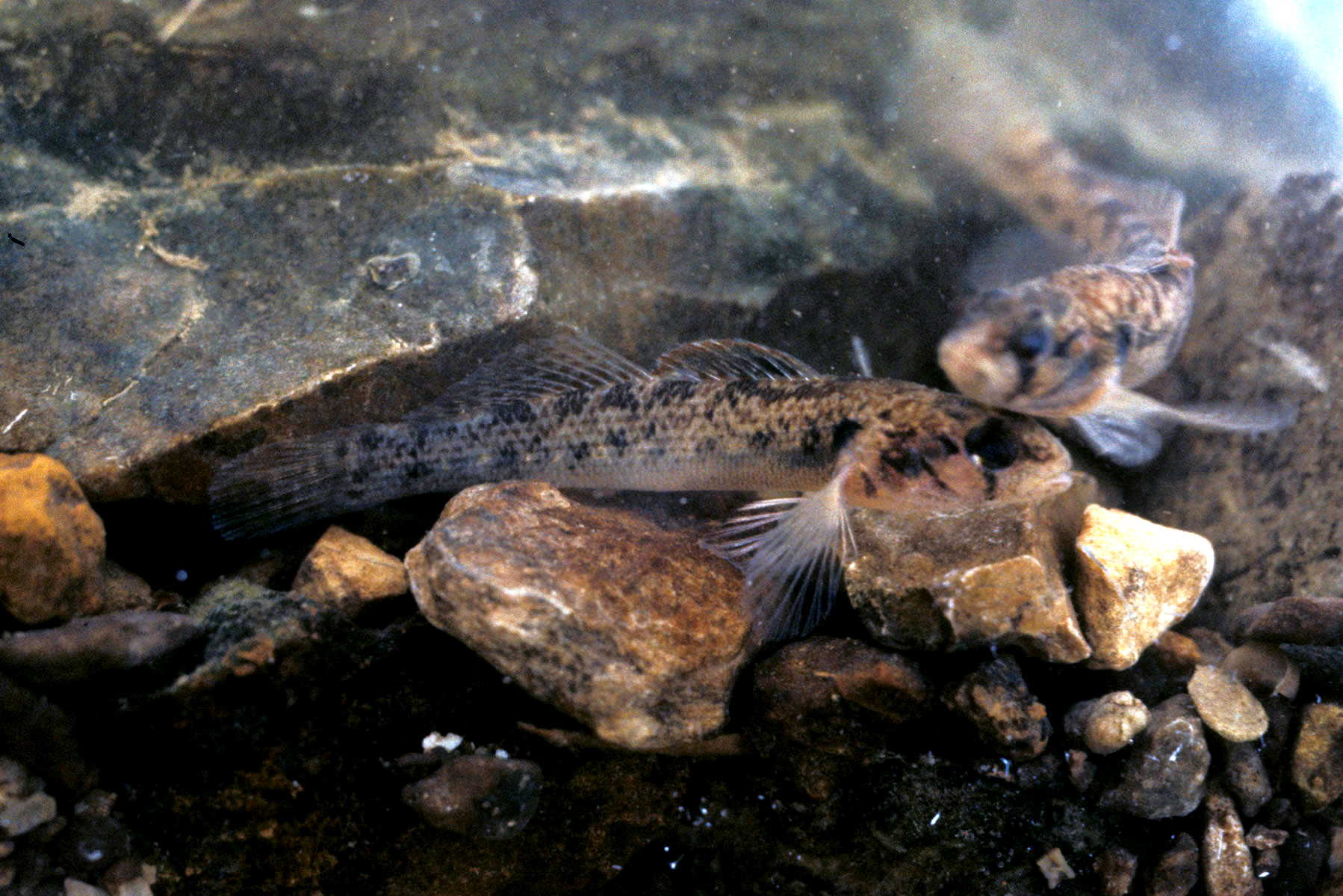

Conservation status
- Vulnerable (IUCN 3.1)

Scientific classification
- Kingdom: Animalia
- Phylum: Chordata
- Class: Actinopterygii
- Order: Perciformes
- Family: Percidae
- Genus: Etheostoma
- Species: E. striatulum

Binomial name
- Etheostoma striatulum Page & Braasch, 1977

= Striated darter =

Species of fish

The striated darter (Etheostoma striatulum) is a species of freshwater ray-finned fish, a darter from the subfamily Etheostomatinae, part of the family Percidae, which also contains the perches, ruffes and pikeperches. It is endemic to the eastern United States. It occurs in the Duck River system in Tennessee. It inhabits rocky pools in creeks. This species can reach a length of 5.6 centimetres (2.2 in) TL though most only reach about 3.8 centimetres (1.5 in).
