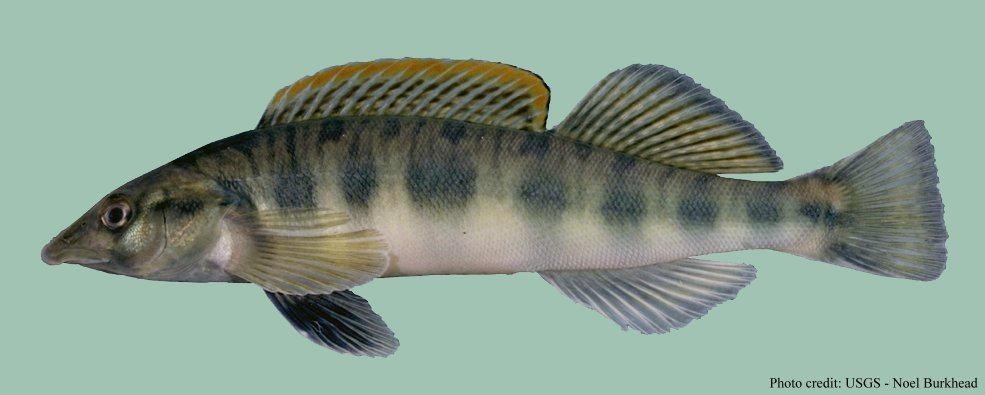

Conservation status
- Vulnerable (IUCN 3.1)

Scientific classification
- Kingdom: Animalia
- Phylum: Chordata
- Class: Actinopterygii
- Order: Perciformes
- Family: Percidae
- Genus: Percina
- Species: P. burtoni

Binomial name
- Percina burtoni Fowler, 1945

Synonyms
- Percina caprodes burtoni Fowler, 1945

= Percina burtoni =

Blotchside logperch

Species of fish

Percina burtoni, the blotchside logperch or blotchside darter, is a small, endangered species of freshwater ray-finned fish, a darter from the subfamily Etheostomatinae, part of the family Percidae, which also contains the perches, ruffes and pikeperches. It is endemic to the United States and classified as vulnerable on the IUCN Red List.

== Taxonomy ==
The blotchside darter was formerly described as a subspecies of Percina caprodes. It was first formally described as P. c. burtoni in 1945 by the American ichthyologist Henry Weed Fowler (1878–1961) with the type locality given as The Swannanoa River near Oteen in Buncombe County, North Carolina. The specific name honors the eminent naturalist who collected the type, Edward Milby Burton (1898–1977), formerly of the Charleston Museum.

== Description ==
The blotchside darter is mostly covered with blotches on the midlateral row of the body. It has prepectoral scales and an orange submarginal band in the first dorsal fin. There are 15–18 dorsal spines, 14–15 dorsal rays, 14–15 pectoral rays, 2 anal spines, 10–12 anal rays, and 6 branchiostegal rays.

The species is olive in color dorsally, cream-colored ventrally, and has a lateral series of 8–10 dark green to black round or oval blotches. There is a distinct black spot at the base of the tail. The head is dark above and white below. In the first dorsal fin is a thin black margin. There is a thin orange submarginal band and a wide diffuse black basal band. The second dorsal and caudal fins have several narrow black bands; other fins are clear or yellow in color.

== Distribution and habitat ==
The blotchside darter is endemic to the United States. It can occasionally be found in the Tennessee River system in Tennessee, Virginia, and North Carolina. It formerly occurred in the Cumberland River system in Kentucky and Tennessee and may still persist in what is known as Little South Fork in Kentucky.

The species lives in swift streams and is usually found over gravel in water 0.5–1 m in depth. It has been observed in clear, moderately large streams in which a variety of fishes occur, indicating that it requires high water quality and ecosystem health. It appears intolerant of reservoir conditions.

== Conservation ==
The blotchside darter is classified as vulnerable on the IUCN Red List. It is known from several dozen localities, but total population size is unknown. It is likely to be detrimentally affected by siltation, turbidity, chemical pollution, and impoundment.
