= Elegant madtom =

Conservation status
- Least Concern (IUCN 3.1)

Scientific classification
- Kingdom: Animalia
- Phylum: Chordata
- Class: Actinopterygii
- Division: Teleostei
- Order: Siluriformes
- Family: Ictaluridae
- Genus: Noturus
- Species: N. elegans

Binomial name
- Noturus elegans W. R. Taylor, 1969

Species of fish

The elegant madtom (Noturus elegans) is a fish native to Tennessee, Alabama, and Kentucky, and is one of twenty-nine species of madtom. It prefers to live in small rivers and gravel-bottomed creeks. The average lifespan of the elegant madtom is two years.

The elegant madtom is not listed on any federal or state conservation lists. However, scientists who have done surveys on the fish have recommended that it should be listed as threatened.

== Classification ==
Until the 1990s and early 2000, Noturus crypticus and Noturus fasciatus were thought to be the same species as Noturus elegans. However, they are now considered distinct species. The chucky madtom, N. crypticus, is the only one of the three currently listed as severely threatened.

== Geographic distribution ==
The elegant madtom is found primarily in Tennessee and northern Alabama, in the upper and lower portions of the Tennessee River, and also in the Roaring River, the Green River drainage, Dunn Creek, Tennessee, and in Piney Creek, Paint Rock River, and Flint River, Alabama. It can be found in lower north-central Tennessee rivers, such as at Little Chucky Creek in Greene County. The elegant madtom was also found in central Kentucky, in the Green River drainage. Its status in Alabama is unknown. N. exilis was misidentified in 1996 at Bear Creek, Alabama, as N. elegans. This mis-identification could be a reason for a small decrease in the overall population size. According to surveys there are very low numbers of the elegant madtom in the middle and upper Tennessee River drainage. The survey reports that these low populations could be due to the lack of available nesting sites, as it prefers habitats with riffles and rocks to nest under. However, the elegant madtom is common in the Green River and lower rivers in Tennessee that are close to Alabama.

== Ecology ==
The elegant madtom from immaturity to adulthood is an invertivore, which means it feeds on invertebrates. It is only common in a few places, and faces predation from larger fish such as the largemouth bass and catfish. However, the elegant madtom does have a defense in its venom delivery system, a venom delivery gland in its pectoral and dorsal spines to deter potential predators or competitors. Competitors for invertebrate food sources include salamanders, lizards, and some snakes.

The elegant madtom prefers to live in small rivers and gravel-bottomed creeks, with only minor ripples in the stream, and can be found most commonly underneath large rocks. There is little known about what abiotic factors influence where the elegant madtom will decide to nest. From investigation of a sister species in the same genus, Noturus baileyi, which lives in a similar habitat, it has been posited that the elegant madtom will prefer a pH of 6.2 to 7, and a temperature of 14.0 to 22.0 °C (57.2 to 71.6 °F). Dams, uplands habitats and waterfalls cause barriers for the elegant madtom. Human activity in flooding a river or changing its structure can ruin the habitat of the elegant madtom, which prefers shallow slow-moving freshwater. Dams can also affect the distribution of the species, isolating them and limiting their ability to change habitats or mate. The release of toxic chemicals or invasive fish into the stream can destroy small populations.

== Reproductive cycle ==
Approximately a year after emerging from its egg, the elegant madtom will reach sexual maturity. Then, after this year of growth, a member of Noturus elegans will find a mate and make a nest beneath a rock in a river or stream. Rocks are very important for the elegant madtom, because without this substrate to lay their eggs under, they will not have the ability to make an effective nest that they can protect. The average brood size for the elegant madtom is 50 eggs. Not much is known about when or how often the elegant madtom mates. It has been estimated, again from data on sister species Noturus baileyi, that mating takes place once a year in the months of May to August. The average lifespan for the elegant madtom is two years.

== Current management ==
The elegant madtom is not listed on the endangered or threatened federal or state lists. Scientists who have done surveys on the fish have recommended that it should be listed as threatened.
