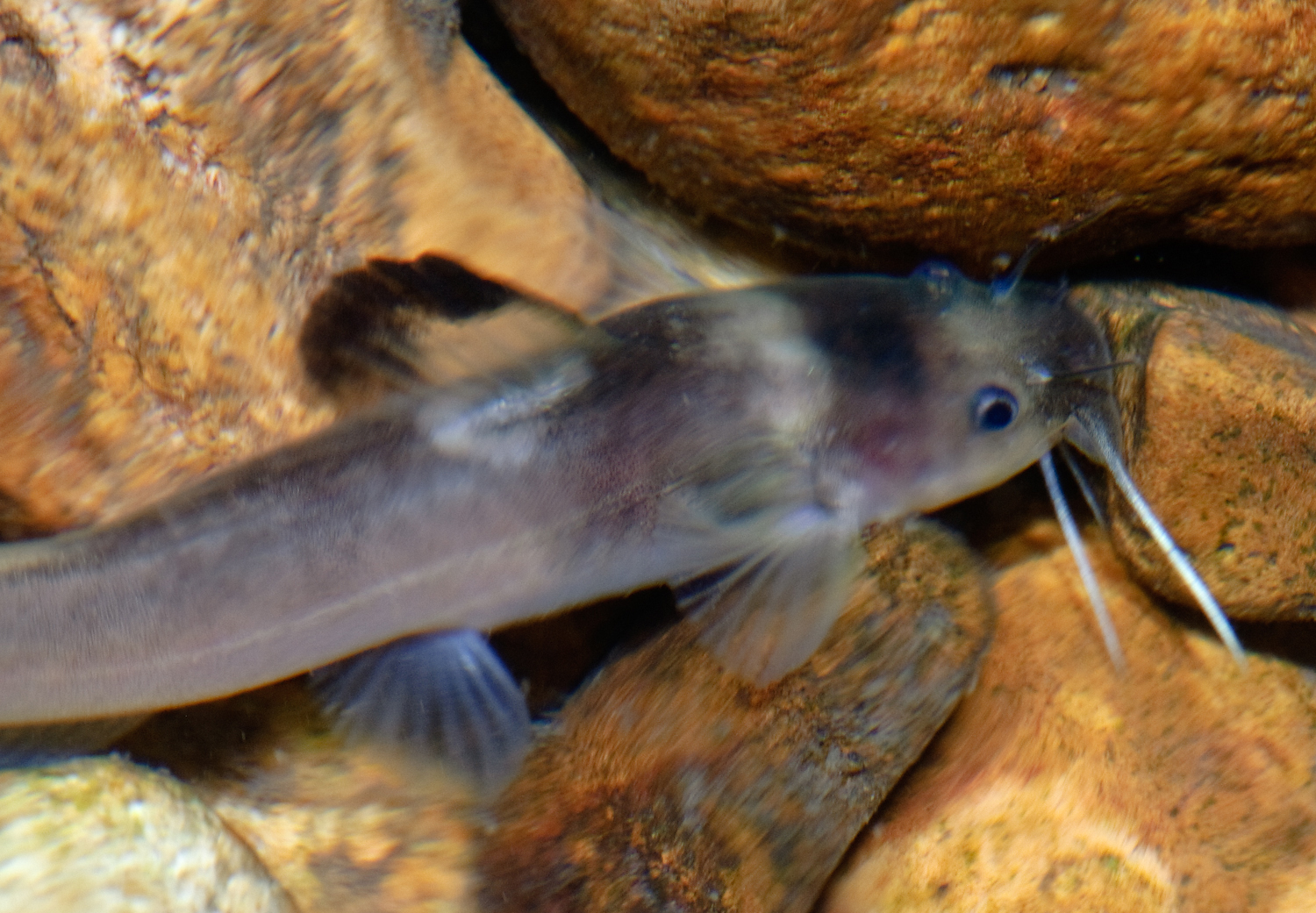

Conservation status
- Least Concern (IUCN 3.1)

Scientific classification
- Kingdom: Animalia
- Phylum: Chordata
- Class: Actinopterygii
- Order: Siluriformes
- Family: Ictaluridae
- Genus: Noturus
- Species: N. exilis

Binomial name
- Noturus exilis E. W. Nelson, 1876

= Noturus exilis =

Species of fish

Noturus exilis, also called the slender madtom, is a species of the catfish family Ictaluridae. Ictaluridae includes bullheads, madtoms, channel catfish, and blue catfish. Noturus exilis is found in the central portion of the Mississippi River basin, but is most abundant in Ozarkian streams. Slender madtoms occur west of the Mississippi River in the Ozarks of Oklahoma, Arkansas, and Missouri north to southern Wisconsin and Minnesota. It also occurs east of the Mississippi River in the uplands of Alabama, Tennessee, and Kentucky in the Tennessee, Cumberland, and Green drainages. Edward Nelson first described Noturus exilis in 1876. The slender madtom is moderately large with a terminal to sub-terminal mouth, flat head, small eyes, and black marginal bands on the median fins. Most slender madtoms are less than 90 millimetres (3.5 in). Noturus flavus and Noturus nocturnus are rather similar in shape and coloration to Norturus exilis. Slender madtoms inhabit small to medium-sized streams, in riffle and flowing pool habitats with coarse gravel to slab rock substrates. The presence of a shelter object, such as a large rock, seems to be important in habitat selection.

== Distribution ==
Slender madtoms inhabit two disjunct areas of the Central Highlands: one in the Ozark Highlands ranging from eastern Kansas and Oklahoma to the southern tip of Illinois and including most of Missouri and northwest Arkansas, and the other in the Eastern Highlands, from middle Tennessee and part of southeastern Kentucky, ranging into northern Alabama and Mississippi. The slender madtom also occurs as several smaller, isolated populations in Iowa, Illinois and southern Wisconsin and Minnesota. Slender madtoms have seen a decrease in population size from their previous habitat ranges. Due to habitat alteration along the small streams of the Tennessee drainage, this species may be in great danger of extirpation from Mississippi. It has also declined in the northern part of its range in Wisconsin, due primarily to agricultural runoff or alterations in river flow due to dams. The slender madtom's range has mostly likely decreased due to dam construction, channelization, and agricultural runoff.

== Ecology ==
The slender madtom's diet consists of midges, mayflies, caddisflies, isopods, amphipods, and copepods, but ephemeroteran naiads and chironomid larvae make up a majority of their diet. Smallmouth bass (Micropterus dolomieu) is a known predator of slender madtoms, which may be one reason why slender madtoms prefers a nocturnal lifestyle, seeking cover during the day when this visual predator is on the prowl. Embryo predation by Orconectes virilis (virile crayfish), Campostoma anomalum (central stoneroller) and Etheostoma caeruleum (rainbow darter) has also been noted. The slender madtom and the orangethroat darter (Etheostoma spectabile) also compete for and share the same diet. The slender madtom inhabits the rocky riffles and pools of creeks and small rivers, spending much of the day hiding under large rocks and emerging to feed at night. Slender madtoms feed preferably after dusk and before dawn. Slender Madtoms have also been observed in high percentages in vegetated patches and backwaters during late summer. The slender madtom can be found in streams with current speeds from 8–92 cm/s and can be found at depths between 5–42 cm. The slender madtom has never been a strong swimmer, which has reduced their dispersal over the centuries.

== Life history ==
Mayden and Burr found that reproductive activity was concentrated from mid-June through July at water temperatures of 23.5–29 °C in Southern Illinois. Large lowland rivers, such as the Missouri River and Mississippi River, have high silt loads, covering the gravel and rocks that madtoms require for nesting and diurnal refugia. Spawning sites are usually cavities excavated under large rocks, usually in pool areas. Nests have been found to contain 27–74 eggs and are protected by the male until the yolk sac is absorbed by the juveniles. Hatching occurs within eight to nine days in 25 °C water. Individuals are one half the length of a one-year-old by three weeks. Summer is the season of greatest growth, particularly during the first two years of life, and in winter growth slows to a near standstill. Females are capable of spawning their first summer, especially in harsher northern conditions, as long as a critical size is attained (approximately 50 mm in southern Illinois). In contrast, males do not breed until two years of age. The ratio of ovary weight to adjusted body weight (GSI) increased in females in fall and spring, with greater rates of growth in mature adults. Slender madtom are usually 3 inches (7.6 cm) or less in size with a maximum of about 4 inches (10 cm). Slender madtoms can live up to 5 years of age, but most have been collected between 1–3 years old. Adult slender madtoms are weak dispersers, with poor swimming abilities, a characteristic that may have contributed to the existence of two disjoint populations of the species.

== Current management ==
Populations across the slender madtom's range have declined since the late 1970s. The species is nearly extirpated in Wisconsin, although once more widespread there than in Minnesota. Causes for decline may include siltation and turbidity in farming areas, and the dewatering of habitats by hydropower operations. Poor farming practices near streams could be contributing sediments and large amounts of nutrients into streams inhabited by slender madtoms and other species that make the overall ecosystem uninhabitable. Human uses have degraded the habitat and livelihood of the slender madtom and associated species. Predation and intraspecific and interspecific competition may also affect the survival of slender madtoms. The Minnesota Department of Natural Resources has done stream surveys but found very few slender madtom specimens. The slender madtom has not had a population assessment at the national level. The slender madtom is classified as endangered in Mammoth Cave National Park. The slender madtom is also classified as endangered in Wisconsin. No current management is being done to protect the slender madtom from outside pollutants and other detrimental factors. Some state agencies have surveyed streams for slender madtoms, but no management plan has been put in place. Sufficient research has not been collected on the slender madtom to determine the best method to create new habitat or restore the previous habitat to benefit the slender madtom for decades to come.
