= Pygmy madtom =

Conservation status
- Endangered (IUCN 3.1)

Scientific classification
- Kingdom: Animalia
- Phylum: Chordata
- Class: Actinopterygii
- Division: Teleostei
- Order: Siluriformes
- Family: Ictaluridae
- Genus: Noturus
- Species: N. stanauli

Binomial name
- Noturus stanauli Etnier & R. E. Jenkins, 1980

Species of fish

The pygmy madtom (Noturus stanauli) is a species of fish in the family Ictaluridae endemic to the United States, in only two known regions of Tennessee. Madtoms are the smallest members of the Ictalurid catfish family. Members of the genus Noturus can be distinguished by their small size, unusually long adipose fin, and rounded caudal fin. Most specimens have been collected over shallow, fine gravel shoals with moderate to swift flow, usually near the stream bank.

== Distribution ==
The pygmy madtom has an extremely limited distribution, appearing only in samples taken from the Duck River, in Humphreys and Hickman Counties, Tennessee; and from the Clinch River, Hancock County, Tennessee. These two locations are separated by about 600 river miles, though no current evidence indicates the entire historical range of the species.

== Ecology ==
The pygmy madtom is the smallest of madtoms, reaching only about 50 mm in length at adulthood. It is dark brown dorsally and nearly white ventrally, and is similar to the least madtom, but is distinguished by its white snout and large teeth on the front edge of the pectoral spine. The caudal fin has a dark band or dusky blotches in the middle. The anal fin has 14–17 rays.

N. stanauli has currently been observed and collected in moderate to swift gravel runs of clear medium-sized rivers in pea-sized gravel of fine sand substrates. Although no observations of seasonal habitat shifts have been made, the closely related smoky madtom is known to switch from riffles to overwinter in shallow pools. Two closely related species, N. baileyi (smoky madtom) and N. flavipinnis (yellowfin madtom), are found in the flowing portions of pools during the reproductive season.

Many specific biological traits of this madtom have not been gathered to date, mainly stemming from a lack of observable specimens in their natural environment. A total of 10 individuals have been found from both locations since the species was listed as endangered in 1993. Conservation Fisheries, Inc. of Knoxville, Tennessee, was able to propagate young on several instances and reported adult activity was limited only to the early evening hours. Because of this observation, the adults are believed to be crepuscular.

Madtoms almost exclusively prey on aquatic insect larvae. They are primarily opportunistic feeders and take prey items in proportion to their abundance.

Related madtoms nest in cavities beneath slab rocks and at times use other cover objects, such as cans and bottles. As native mussels are abundant in pygmy madtom habitat, this species might use empty mussel shells for nesting cover. Reproduction likely occurs from spring to early summer.

== Management ==
The pygmy madtom was listed as federally endangered throughout its entire range in 1993, so a management plan was drafted in 1994 by the United States Fish and Wildlife Service outlining description of actions to be taken, time frame, responsible parties, labor type and various other activities relating to species repopulation.

The two known populations are isolated from each other by impoundments, making recolonization of any extirpated population impossible without human intervention. The absence of natural gene flow among the limited populations of these fishes leaves the long-term genetic viability of these isolated populations in question.

Additionally, several madtom species have, for unexplained reasons, been extirpated from sections of their naturally occurring range. One hypothesis states, "...in addition to visible habitat degradation be related to their being unable to cope with olfactory 'noise' being added to riverine ecosystems in the form of a wide variety of complex organic chemicals that may occur only in trace amounts." Many species that once existed throughout major portions of the Tennessee River now exist only as isolated remnant populations, and extirpations and extinctions are predicted.

Threats affecting the pygmy madtom are increased urbanization, coal mining, toxic chemical spills, siltation, improper pesticide use, and stream bank erosion. Additional threats include gravel dredging, water withdrawals, and agricultural practices. None of the threats has been eliminated since the fish was listed; consequently, both the Duck and Clinch River populations remain vulnerable to extirpation. Existing federal and state laws and regulations are applied to actions conducted within the range of pygmy madtom to protect the fish and its habitats. However, due to difficulty in finding the fish in surveys, the extent of its habitat is unknown.

Monitoring of the species is difficult due to its scarcity in both abundance and distribution. Given the current state of the population, monitoring techniques must minimize impact to the existing individuals.
