= Checkered madtom =

Conservation status
- Least Concern (IUCN 3.1)

Scientific classification
- Kingdom: Animalia
- Phylum: Chordata
- Class: Actinopterygii
- Order: Siluriformes
- Family: Ictaluridae
- Genus: Noturus
- Species: N. flavater

Binomial name
- Noturus flavater W. R. Taylor, 1969

Species of fish

The checkered madtom (Noturus flavater) is a small freshwater catfish found in the United States, in the rivers of Arkansas and Missouri. It is one of 29 species of madtom.

== Description ==
Like many other madtoms, the checkered madtom has a stout body. The body is yellow and has four obvious saddle-like stripes of black on top. The bottom is white to yellow. The dorsal fin on the back has a black blotch on the top third of the fin. The caudal (tail) fin has a black bar at its base and at the end. The caudal fin is usually straight or slightly rounded.

The checkered madtom is thought to be the second largest species of madtom commonly 4-7 inches, with the largest being Noturus flavus.

== Distribution and habitat ==
The checkered madtom is uncommon in the upper White River system in southern Missouri and northern Arkansas. The checkered madtom has a disjunct population in the Jacks Fork and Current River (Missouri) in Missouri.

The fish inhabits the margins of pools and in the backwaters of clear small or medium rivers, usually with a moderate to high gradient. It is often found among leaves and woody debris. The fish is demersal—it stays near the bed of the body of water.

== Biology ==
Daytime habitat use in the Jacks Fork River, Missouri, found Checkered Madtom commonly associated with boulder substrate and an average water depth of 0.67 meters.

Checkered madtoms are ready to spawn by April, but may not spawn until July. Males of three to five years guard the nests. Females most likely leave the nests while males remain to care for the embryos.

Checkered madtom embryos resemble the embryos of other madtoms. Larvae 10 to 12 days old begin to have proportions resembling adults.
