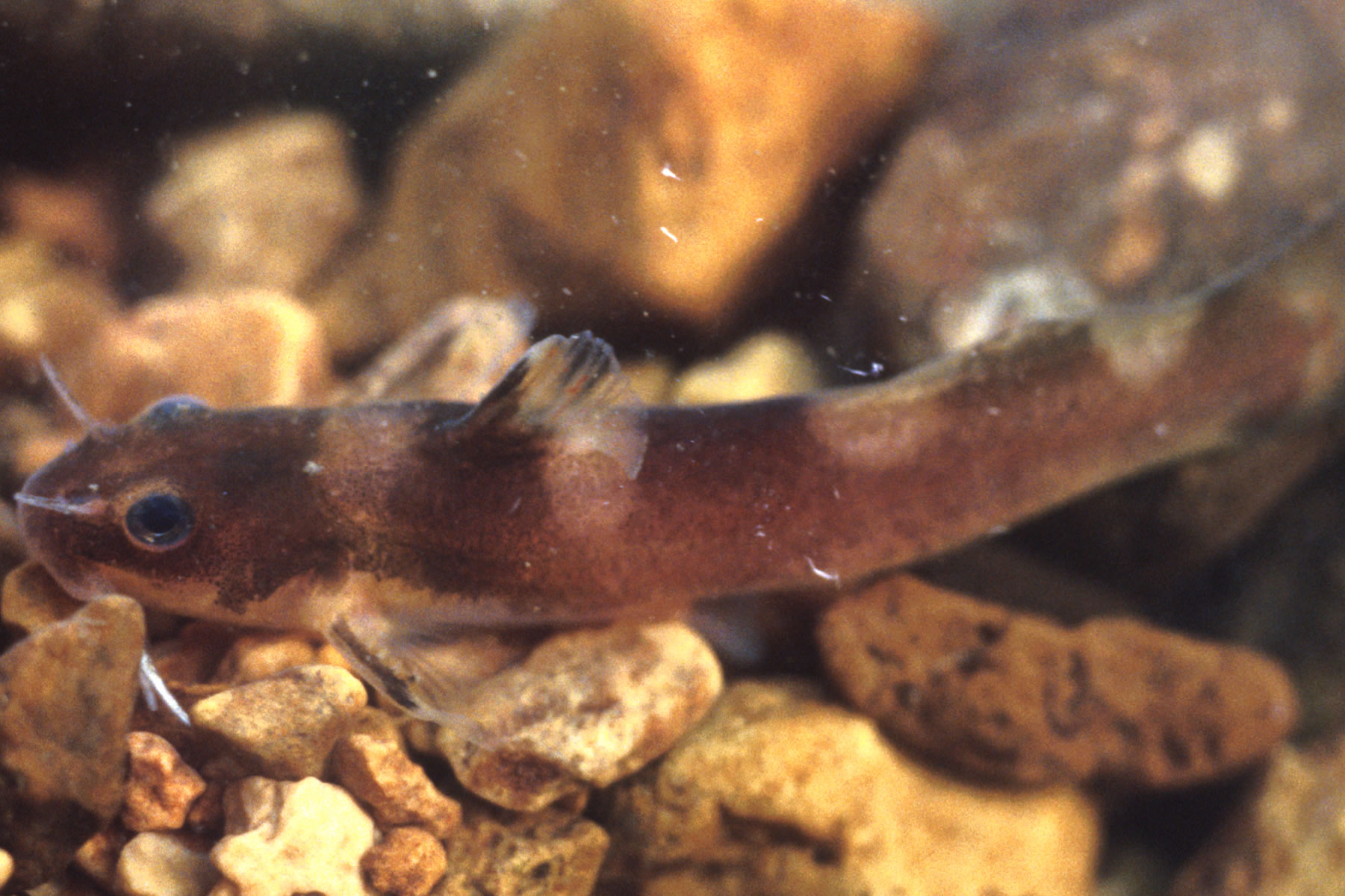

Conservation status
- Endangered (IUCN 3.1)

- Imperiled (NatureServe)

Scientific classification
- Kingdom: Animalia
- Phylum: Chordata
- Class: Actinopterygii
- Order: Siluriformes
- Family: Ictaluridae
- Genus: Noturus
- Species: N. fasciatus

Binomial name
- Noturus fasciatus Burr, Eisenhour & Grady, 2005

= Noturus fasciatus =

Species of fish

Noturus fasciatus (saddled madtom) is a rare freshwater fish native to the U.S. state of Tennessee. It was first described as a species separate from Noturus crypticus in 2005. It is restricted to the Duck River system and is also found in two minor tributaries on the lower section of the Tennessee River. This species dwells in small to medium-sized streams where they can be found under gravel, rubble, and slab rock. They feed mostly on insects such as: stone, caddis, and mayfly larvae.

== Geographic distribution ==
The saddled madtom is found in the Duck River system and two minor tributaries of the Tennessee River in the western part of Tennessee and has not yet been found in other streams or states. It is believed that this species can be found in neighboring streams and river systems but until proper research is conducted, it remains a theory.

== Ecology ==
A quantitative diet analysis has not yet been performed on the saddled madtom. However, using diet information of other species that are closely related to, even so closely related that they are known to interbreed with each other, suggest that they are invertivores, feeding mostly on insects, such as caddis, may, and stone fly larva. Feeding on these insects can present competition with other species, such as salamanders and trout species. The saddled madtom is a small species, which allows it to be prey to larger species such as: rock, small mouth, and largemouth bass. Other species that may prey on this species are larger, piscivorous fish, brown trout being a good example. Madtoms in general, have a distinct adaptation that allows them to secrete venom through delivery glands located on the dorsal and pectoral spines. This venom is intended to injure predators and keep them safe from predation. Another strategy that allows for less predation on the saddled madtom is that it lives in riffles under gravel and rubble.

== Life history ==
The saddled madtom has not been researched enough to determine things such as when, where and how often it breeds, how long it takes to reach sexual maturity, or the life span of the species. Using sister species, such as Noturus elegans, crypticus, and baileyi, we can gather a general idea of its life history. Based on the sister species, the saddled madtom breeds between late May and August, breeding on rocks and gravel substrate. The average brood size would be around 50 and the average life span would be two years, reaching sexual maturity after the first year of life. Human impacts on this species include dam construction, which prohibits the species from spreading. Also erosion and run off pollution from agriculture affect the health of this species.

== Management ==
As of 2011, there were no specific management practices in place to protect the saddled madtom. The saddled madtom is currently listed as G2 by NatureServe, which is globally imperiled, and it is also believed to be on the decline in numbers due to pollution, erosion, and siltation problems.
