= Ozark madtom =

Conservation status
- Least Concern (IUCN 3.1)

Scientific classification
- Kingdom: Animalia
- Phylum: Chordata
- Class: Actinopterygii
- Order: Siluriformes
- Family: Ictaluridae
- Genus: Noturus
- Species: N. albater

Binomial name
- Noturus albater W. R. Taylor, 1969

Species of fish

The Ozark madtom (Noturus albater) is a freshwater fish endemic to the United States. It is one of 29 species of madtom.

== Description ==
The Ozark madtom has a stout body and small head. A dark bar can be found at the base of the caudal fin, and the caudal fin is usually straight or slightly rounded. The pectoral fin has 9 rays, and the anal fin has 13 to 16 rays. The fish has a total length of 120 mm (4 in).

== Distribution and habitat ==
The Ozark madtom are found around the upper White River and the Little Red River in the Ozark Uplands in Arkansas and Missouri, United States.

The Ozark madtom can by found in riffles and rocky pools, as well as cool, clear, high-gradient creeks and small to medium-sized rivers. They are found in shallow depths (usually of less than half a meter deep) and high velocity currents. During the day, they use the rocky bed bottom as cover.

== Diet ==
Most of the Ozark madtom's diet consists of aquatic insects, with Diptera (flies) making up a majority. Ephemeroptera (mayflies) make up most of the remainder of the diet.

== Behavior ==
It is presumed that Ozark madtom are nocturnal.

Nests are found under small flat rocks in pools that are about one-third to two-thirds of a meter deep. In the moments before spawning, males have enlarged head muscles and swollen lips, similar to other madtoms. It is presumed that these enlarged heads are associated with nest construction, helping with the clearing and burrowing by males under rocks.

== Life history ==
Ozark madtoms have yellow spherical eggs. Their eggs adhere to each other but to no other surfaces. After about 4 days after spawning, the embryos obviously show blood, myomeres are well developed, the tail is free from the yolk sac, pigment is well developed in the eye, and a couple sets of barbels are beginning to form.

At hatching, the larvae are 8 mm (0.3 in) long and mostly translucent. They gain melanophores on their head. Caudal and anal fins begin to develop and another pair of barbels appears near the nostrils. About 7 days after hatching, the larvae are 12 mm (0.5 in) long. All fins are nearly adult-like. The barred pattern found in adults does not form until later.

After 9 months, the fish are about 53 mm (2 in) long.

== Predators ==
Luxilus zonatus (bleeding shiners) are known to prey upon the Ozark madtom's eggs, while Etheostoma caeruleum (rainbow darters) and Percina evides (gilt darters) are known to prey upon the Ozark madtom's larvae.

== Parasites ==
Ozark madtoms are known to possess Lernaea scars.
