= Piebald madtom =

Conservation status
- Near Threatened (IUCN 3.1)

Scientific classification
- Kingdom: Animalia
- Phylum: Chordata
- Class: Actinopterygii
- Order: Siluriformes
- Family: Ictaluridae
- Genus: Noturus
- Species: N. gladiator

Binomial name
- Noturus gladiator Thomas & Burr, 2004

Species of fish

The piebald madtom (Noturus gladiator) is a species of madtom catfish that is found in seven river systems in the Tennessee and Mississippi coastal tributaries. The most common systems the species is found in are the Hatchie River, Obion River, and Wolf River. This species is very susceptible to environmental changes, including flow regimes, siltation in nesting sites, and poor environmental quality. The Noturus catfish reproduces from February to September, and females reach sexual maturity in only one year. Current management strategies for this recently discovered species haven't been completely developed yet, but could be comparable to the management of other madtom species. Siltation in the southern portions of the rivers inhabited by Noturus gladiator that comes from the northern aspects of the waterways is causing stress on the reproductive success due to nest suffocation. There are records as close as twenty years ago showing the species inhabiting multiple other rivers around the areas it currently inhabits. This could be a sign that the species is in decline. There should be population surveys done on the existing habitat and water quality surveys done in the inhabited areas, as well as the uninhabited neighboring areas, to see what the limiting pollutant might be in the water, causing habitats to shrink. The area that this species inhabits needs to be managed in a way that could see a resurgence in the numbers of this species.

== Geographic distribution ==
Noturus gladiator has a relatively small range, only including a few of the Mississippi River drainages coming out of Tennessee and Mississippi. This range also includes the Yazoo and Big Black River systems in central Mississippi, but has not been collected in the Yazoo River since 1978, or the Big Black River since 1983. To the north, it occupies the Hatchie River, Obion River, and Wolf River. The species is believed to have inhabited a broader range at one time, but due to siltation from river-based transport, construction, and farming, it has been reduced. In the past, it was present in the Loosahatchie River, but has not been found since 1954. It is thought to have once occupied the Forked Deer drainage, but no longer does after the channelization of this system. Most of the remaining populations have been pushed to sites of the rivers with lower human densities and clearer flowing water. At one point, N. gladiator was lumped with another species of Noturus, but recent molecular testing made it able to become its own species. The dorsal spine structure of N. gladiator had to be studied to determine if it was its own species. This finding limited the range of N. stigmosus to only the northern portion of its formerly known range and gave the southern range to N. gladiator.

== Ecology ==
Noturus gladiator is found most commonly on clay or sandy substrate in areas that can provide cover, such as leaf or woody debris. Environmental cleanliness is a major factor in determining if a habitat is suitable or not. Areas that consistently contain silt or have soft, muddy bottoms are not preferred by the species. The preferred stream width is from 4–15m wide, at a temperature of 20–26 degrees Celsius, is 15–50 cm deep, and has a dissolved oxygen level from 4.6-8.5ppm. N. gladiator prefers moderate current. Sexual maturity is reached in the second summer, and the average life span is three years. N. gladiator's diet consists mainly of aquatic insects such as mayflies, caddisflies, stoneflies, and occasionally small fish when size allows. These insects usually only occur in healthy, clean streams, which human activity has limited the amount of suitable streams for these prey items. Like all catfish, they have pectoral and dorsal spines, which ward off predators. These spines are one of the four different variations of spines in Noturus catfish. The dorsal spine of N. gladiator has six to twelve teeth on the rear edge and more large teeth on the front.

== Life history ==
The spawning period is during the summer months, starting in June and running through August. The clutch sizes consist of anywhere from reported seventy to one-hundred oocytes. Dry mass, clutch size, and clutch volume have been found to be directly correlated to female size. The males guard the nests and do not retreat when disturbed. Males stay on the nest after the young hatch and until they are free swimming. The most common nest sites are under rocks or in discarded cans or jugs. Males that do not have a nest to guard still will find a nest site and guard it until the mating season is over. Growth is rapid over N. gladiator's lifespan. After the first three months of life, N. gladiator will be 35–40mm, and after the first year, 45–50mm. Sexually mature adults are between 40mm and well over 100mm. Their egg size is relatively large compared to their body size, and the intensive parental care given to the young helps maintain the species' populations. In captivity, N. gladiator has been found to be easily induced to spawn.

== Current management ==
Tennessee lists N. gladiator as a vulnerable species, and also as "In need of management." The state of Mississippi's madtom population is shrinking to the point of proposing N. gladiator to become an endangered species. Population studies have since been done and revealed that N. gladiator is sporadic but not as rare as once thought. Due to human-related activities, the success of the species has dwindled from recent historical reports. N. gladiator is a new species, but was once thought to be a subspecies of another Noturus. This former group was thought to be one of the most richly populated species of Noturus in America. Poor agricultural practices and river reconstruction are the main causes of the diminishing populations. The lower Hatchie River was channelized for agricultural purposes and has taken out all of the cover N. gladiator could have used to feed and reproduce. Before this channelization, the lower portion was also uninhabitable for N. gladiator because of extreme siltation due to erosion from agriculture. The remaining populations of N. gladiator are sustaining themselves in the stretches of untainted habitat in the upper portions of their river ranges. As long as these areas remain undisturbed from siltation and cover loss, N. gladiator should not decline any more.
