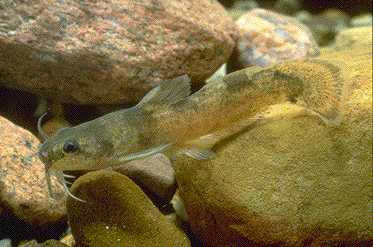

Conservation status
- Least Concern (IUCN 3.1)

Scientific classification
- Kingdom: Animalia
- Phylum: Chordata
- Class: Actinopterygii
- Order: Siluriformes
- Family: Ictaluridae
- Genus: Noturus
- Species: N. miurus

Binomial name
- Noturus miurus D. S. Jordan, 1877

Synonyms
- Schilbeodes miurus (Jordan, 1877)

= Brindled madtom =

Species of fish

The brindled madtom (Noturus miurus) is a small catfish of the family Ictaluridae that is native to the eastern United States.

== Description ==
Brindled madtoms are approximately 10.1 to 12.6 centimeters (4.0 to 5.0 in) long. The brindled madtom, like other Noturus species, has a caudally-fused adipose fin which extends from the caudal fin and runs nearly to the dorsal fin. The caudal fin spreads around the caudal peduncle, terminating just prior to the anal fin. The species has smooth skin without scales and possesses four pairs of barbels along the premaxilla and dentary. The brindled madtom is laterally compressed along the caudal peduncle and has a dorsally compressed anterior from the pelvic fins to the jaw. The brindled madtom is light brown, with dark dorsal splotches along the tip and two conspicuous saddle marks just behind the dorsal fin. The dorsal fin has a dark, spotted blotch on the tip and is located between the pectoral and pelvic fins.

== Geographic distribution ==
The habitat range is in the eastern United States, west of the Appalachian/Blue Ridge Mountains and from the lower Great Lakes drainage, southwest to Louisiana. River systems included are the Cache (Illinois), Huron, Mississippi and Ohio river basins, Pearl River, Wabash River, and Lake Pontchartrain drainage into the Gulf of Mexico. This species is endangered in Missouri, Kansas, Pennsylvania, and Michigan.

== Ecology ==
In a 1982 study by Burr and Mayden, the quantitative diet of the brindled madtom was determined via dissection of stomach contents which

[…] contained mostly dipteran larvae and pupae, ephemeropteran naiads, trichopteran larvae and adult isopods, […], chironomids and simuliids were most frequently eaten. Ephemeropteran larvae, including the genera Potamanthus and Stenonema, were second in frequency, and trichopteran larvae, primarily the genus Chematopsyche, were third in frequency. Among crustacea, Lirceus and a variety of copepods were next in importance in the diet. Worms, other microcrustaceans, other aquatic insects and fish and plant material made only small contributions to the total diet....

Predation upon adult brindled madtoms is primarily from upper trophic level aquatic predators such as the longnose gar. Brindled madtom egg clutches are a viable food source for multiple opportunistic species including crustaceans, insects, and other fishes. Although most other Noturus species occur primarily in riffles, the brindled madtom occurs primarily in moderately silted pools with heavy texture and mild currents. The brindled madtom thrives in clean, benthic regions of pools in swift streams and rivers that have moderate siltation over a cobble or heavily textured bottom. The species thrives in water with consistent temperatures around 25 to 27 °C (77 to 81 °F). Temperatures above 30 °C (86 °F) are not well tolerated, and mass mortalities observed at temperatures above 33 °C (91 °F).

== Life history ==
It takes one year for females and two years for males to mature sexually and nesting/reproduction extends from May to July, with regional variance according to water temperature. When reproduction begins, the mating pair guards their clutch of 50-100 eggs, which is usually deposited in a protective shelter with a very small opening such as under rocks or in bottles/cans that litter the waterways; and these shelters are layered with mud or silt by the parents. The brindled madtom can produce multiple clutches per year and the average lifespan of the species is about 3 years, with most specimens being found in the 2 year old range. The selective nature of this species as it relates to reproduction habitat puts the reproductive fitness of the species as a whole, in jeopardy. Since this species prefers a substrate which has equal stone, cobble, sediment and texture which provides shelter and preferred nesting opportunities, even the slightest disturbance can drastically alter and distort the balance needed for fitness. The decrease in preferred habitat has contributed to the decline of various species of madtoms, leading to an inter-species breeding, specifically between the brindled madtom and the tadpole madtom, which may lead to further chromosomal evolution within this species as identified by LeGrand's study.
