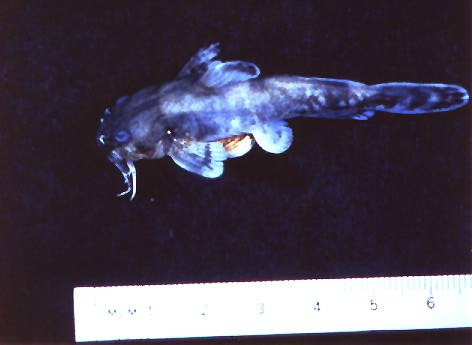

Conservation status
- Near Threatened (IUCN 3.1)

- Threatened (ESA)

Scientific classification
- Kingdom: Animalia
- Phylum: Chordata
- Class: Actinopterygii
- Order: Siluriformes
- Family: Ictaluridae
- Genus: Noturus
- Species: N. placidus

Binomial name
- Noturus placidus W. R. Taylor, 1969

= Neosho madtom =

Species of fish

The Neosho madtom (Noturus placidus) is a small North American freshwater catfish. It has been listed as a near-threatened species in the United States since 1996 by the International Union for Conservation of Nature and as a federally threatened species under the Endangered Species Act of 1973 since June 1990.

The Neosho madtom has features characteristic of all North American catfish, including scaleless skin and a relatively large head with sensory barbels. Adults average less than 3 in (8 cm) in length. They have a brownish midline stripe and an overall mottled appearance. The light-colored edge of the adipose fin is the best characteristic to distinguish it from similar species.

Neosho madtoms are short-lived fish, only occasionally surviving more than three years. Little is known about their reproductive habits. They are believed to spawn in June and July. In closely related species, eggs are laid under small stones, and the eggs and sometimes young fish are guarded by a parent. Adults bury themselves in the gravel during the day and come out to feed at night. Larval, aquatic insects are the major food source of Neosho madtoms. Their preferred habitat is shallow riffles with loose, uncompacted gravel bottoms. They are occasionally found in areas with sandy bottoms covered with leaf litter. Young Neosho madtoms may be found in deeper pools, downstream from riffles.

Historically, the Neosho madtom was found in the Neosho, Cottonwood, Spring, and Illinois Rivers in Kansas, Missouri, and Oklahoma. It is believed to be no longer present in the Illinois River and scattered through the rest of its historic range. In Oklahoma, it is present only in Ottawa and Craig Counties. The Neosho madtom has declined due to habitat destruction. Construction of dams, dredging of gravel, and an increase in water demands have contributed to habitat loss. Pollution from cattle feedlot runoff has adversely affected the fish, as well.
