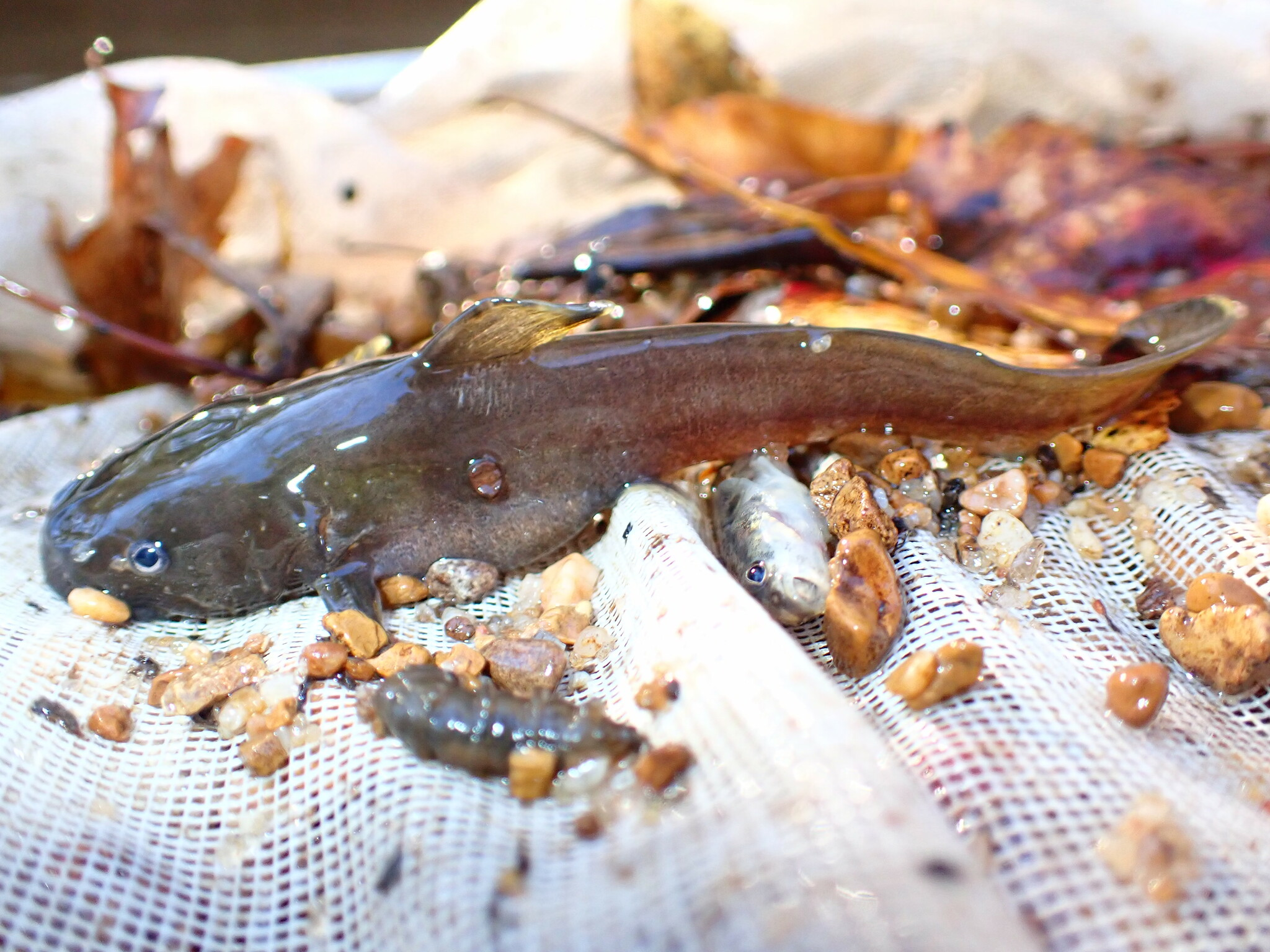

Conservation status
- Least Concern (IUCN 3.1)

Scientific classification
- Kingdom: Animalia
- Phylum: Chordata
- Class: Actinopterygii
- Order: Siluriformes
- Family: Ictaluridae
- Genus: Noturus
- Species: N. phaeus

Binomial name
- Noturus phaeus W. R. Taylor, 1969

= Brown madtom =

Brown Madtom

Species of fish

The brown madtom (Noturus phaeus) is a species of madtom catfish native to the southern United States.

== Distribution ==
The distribution of the brown madtom includes disjunct tributaries of the Mississippi River from the Obion River in Tennessee and Kentucky south to southwestern Mississippi and central and northern Louisiana extending to extreme southern Arkansas. It occupies creeks and small rivers with sand-gravel riffles and runs with debris, rocks, and undercut banks.
