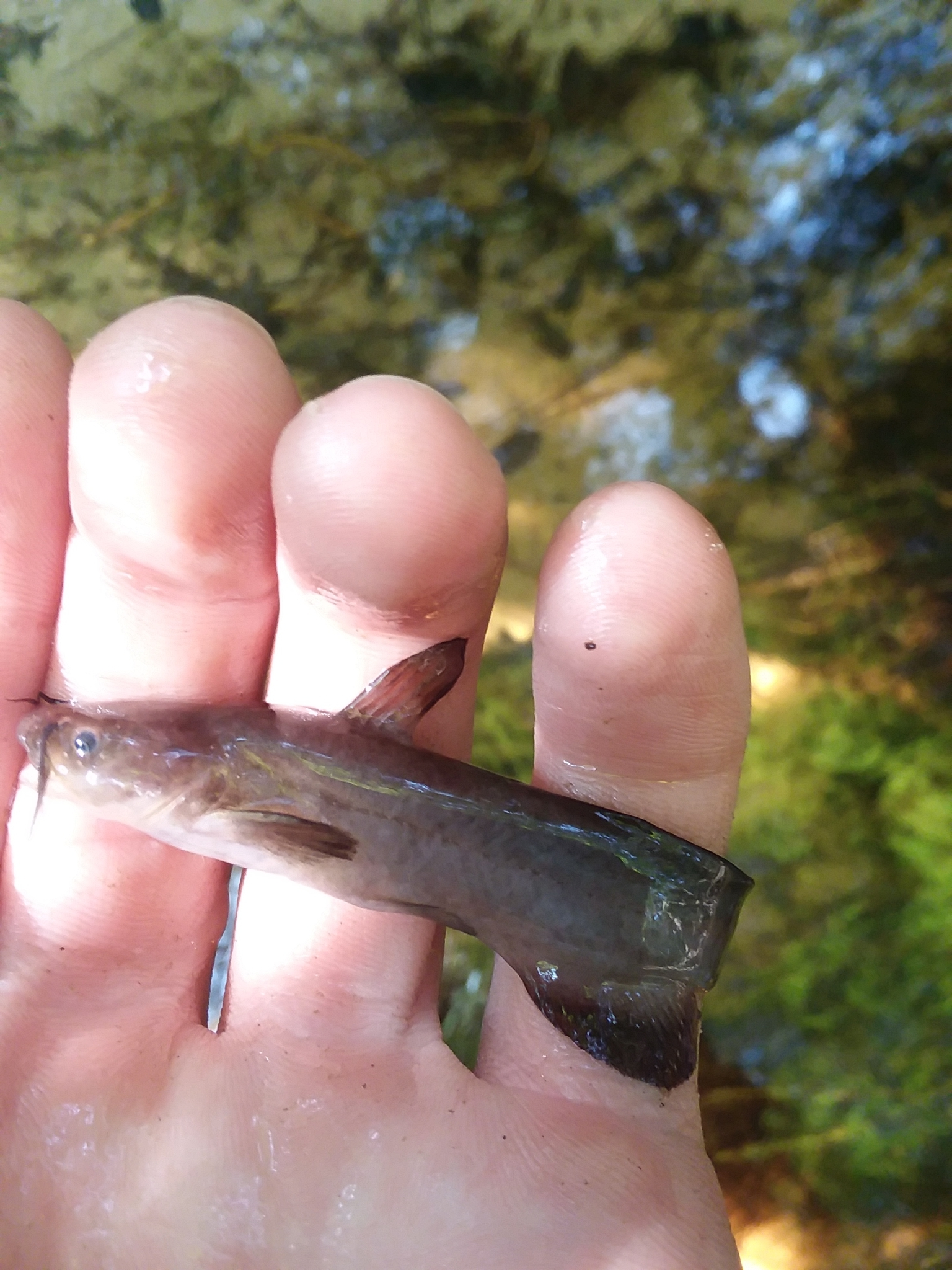

Conservation status
- Least Concern (IUCN 3.1)

Scientific classification
- Kingdom: Animalia
- Phylum: Chordata
- Class: Actinopterygii
- Order: Siluriformes
- Family: Ictaluridae
- Genus: Noturus
- Species: N. funebris

Binomial name
- Noturus funebris (C. H. Gilbert & Swain, 1891)

= Black madtom =

Species of fish

The black madtom (Noturus funebris) is a nocturnal, freshwater, diminutive catfish found in watersheds in Florida, Louisiana, Alabama, and Mississippi, and is one of 29 species of madtom.

== Description ==
The black madtom has a rather plump body. It is a black or dark black blue on the top half and lighter on the lower half. It has an average total length of 7.9 cm, but can reach a total length of 15 cm. They have many tiny dots across their body, most obvious under the head and belly. The anal fin—the fin found under the body of the fish—is long and has 21 to 27 rays, reaching the caudal—or tail—fin. The caudal fin is usually straight or barely rounded. Like other madtoms, black madtoms possess many chemically sensitive sensory pores and barbels.

== Distribution and habitat ==
These fish can commonly be found from gulf slope drainages from Econfina Creek, Florida, to the Pearl River in Louisiana and Mississippi.

Black madtoms prefer permanent springs and creeks or rivers with a moderate or fast flow. They prefer a habitat with a small gravel or coarse sand bed, and prefer the cover of vegetation. It is presumed that eggs are laid under rocks.

== Diet ==
The black madtom is believed to have a similar diet to those of other madtom, consisting of decapods and the larvae of flies, mayflies, and caddisflies. Plant material makes up a greater percent of the diet in summer.

== Behavior ==
The black madtom have been noted to be nocturnal.
