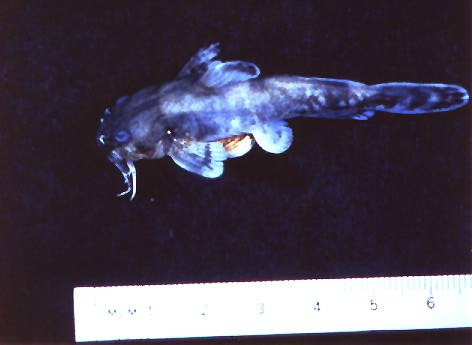
- Neosho madtom, Noturus placidus

Scientific classification
- Kingdom: Animalia
- Phylum: Chordata
- Class: Actinopterygii
- Order: Siluriformes
- Family: Ictaluridae
- Genus: Noturus; Rafinesque, 1818

Type species
- Noturus flavus Rafinesque, 1818

Synonyms
- Schilbeodes Bleeker, 1858; Pimelodon Lesueur, in Vaillant, 1896; Rabida Jordan & Evermann, 1896

= Madtom =

Genus of fishes

Madtoms are freshwater catfishes (order Siluriformes) of the genus Noturus of the family Ictaluridae. It is the most species-rich genus of catfish in North America, native to the central and eastern United States, and adjacent parts of Canada. Their fin spines contain a mild venom with a sting comparable to that of a honey bee.

Nearly half the species of madtom catfishes were described in a single comprehensive revision of the group. Morphology is very conserved in this genus; most of the species look very similar and telling them apart with the usual meristic and morphometric characters used to identify species is difficult. The more conspicuously variable attributes of these secretive fishes are features of pigmentation, which also are more difficult to quantify and often vary according to substrate and water quality. These species have small to tiny or fragmented ranges, and aspects of pigmentation are important diagnostic characters of each. Over one-quarter of the recognized species diversity in Noturus remains undescribed.

A number of madtom species are narrowly distributed and extremely rare, and thus are at great risk of extinction. Noturus trautmani was last sighted in 1957 and declared extinct in 2023.

== Species ==
The 29 recognized species in this genus are:

- Noturus albater W. R. Taylor, 1969 (Ozark madtom)
- Noturus baileyi W. R. Taylor, 1969 (smoky madtom)
- Noturus crypticus Burr, Eisenhour & Grady, 2005 (chucky madtom)
- Noturus elegans W. R. Taylor, 1969 (elegant madtom)
- Noturus eleutherus D. S. Jordan, 1877 (mountain madtom)
- Noturus exilis E. W. Nelson, 1876 (slender madtom)
- Noturus fasciatus Burr, Eisenhour & Grady, 2005 (saddled madtom)
- Noturus flavater W. R. Taylor, 1969 (checkered madtom)
- Noturus flavipinnis W. R. Taylor, 1969 (yellowfin madtom)
- Noturus flavus Rafinesque, 1818 (stonecat)
- Noturus funebris C. H. Gilbert & Swain, 1891 (black madtom)
- Noturus furiosus D. S. Jordan & Meek, 1889 (Carolina madtom)
- Noturus gilberti D. S. Jordan & Evermann, 1889 (orangefin madtom)
- Noturus gladiator Thomas & Burr, 2004 (piebald madtom)
- Noturus gyrinus (Mitchill, 1817) (tadpole madtom)
- Noturus hildebrandi (R. M. Bailey & W. R. Taylor, 1950) (least madtom)
- Noturus insignis (J. Richardson, 1836) (margined madtom)
- Noturus lachneri W. R. Taylor, 1969 (Ouachita madtom)
- Noturus leptacanthus D. S. Jordan, 1877 (speckled madtom)
- Noturus maydeni Egge, 2006 (Black River madtom)
- Noturus miurus D. S. Jordan, 1877 (brindled madtom)
- Noturus munitus Suttkus & W. R. Taylor, 1965 (frecklebelly madtom)
- Noturus nocturnus D. S. Jordan & C. H. Gilbert, 1886 (freckled madtom)
- Noturus phaeus W. R. Taylor, 1969 (brown madtom)
- Noturus placidus W. R. Taylor, 1969 (Neosho madtom)
- Noturus stanauli Etnier & R. E. Jenkins, 1980 (pygmy madtom)
- Noturus stigmosus W. R. Taylor, 1969 (northern madtom)
- Noturus taylori N. H. Douglas, 1972 (Caddo madtom)
- †Noturus trautmani W. R. Taylor, 1969 (Scioto madtom)
