= Mountain madtom =

Conservation status
- Least Concern (IUCN 3.1)

Scientific classification
- Kingdom: Animalia
- Phylum: Chordata
- Class: Actinopterygii
- Order: Siluriformes
- Family: Ictaluridae
- Genus: Noturus
- Species: N. eleutherus

Binomial name
- Noturus eleutherus D. S. Jordan, 1877

Species of fish

The mountain madtom (Noturus eleutherus) is a North American species of temperate freshwater fish belonging to the Noturus genus of the family Ictaluridae. The species was first described to the United States National Museum by Professors Jordan and Gilbert in the Big Pigeon River. The mountain madtom has a body that is characterized as being robust, and by the toxic sting that is associated with their pectoral and dorsal spines. Currently, the Pigeon River Recovery Project is working to try to restore the mountain madtom population that was lost in fisheries. Aside from the Pigeon River Recovery Project, there is little management being applied to this species, and it is currently listed on the threatened species list for the state of Tennessee.

== Geographic distribution ==
The mountain madtom has a broad distribution. Its native range includes larger streams of the Mississippi River drainage from the Little River system of southeastern Oklahoma northeastward. East of the Mississippi it appears through the Ohio drainage to western Pennsylvania. In the south-east it occurs in the Cumberland and Tennessee drainages. In the Tennessee, Cumberland, and Green systems it is confined to the Highland Rim. It is also found in the North Fork Holston, Clinch, and Powell rivers. Generally the mountain madtom is restricted to ridge and valley areas. In the Ohio river basin the mountain madtom and the northern madtom occur in very similar environments but usually not together. It is not found on the Cumberland Plateau or the high reaches on the Blue Ridge mountain streams, due to large boulders found in the streams that lack vegetation. It is not generally found in glaciated regions, nor is it found with any other madtom species except the pygmy madtom (Noturus stanauli). It has also been reported to have been seen occasionally with stonecat madtoms (Noturus flavus) in Ohio.

== Ecology ==
The mountain madtom is found in fast-flowing clear riffles that are shallow generally headwater streams. Because the mountain madtom is sensitive to siltation it is not found where there is sandy substrate. Human actions, like farming or logging, that cause siltation in streams degridate local populations. It likes an intermediate sized cobble substrate. In Pennsylvania it has been noted to be found in areas where there is dense vegetation. Mountain madtoms are found in streams with mainly limestone substrate that would affect the pH of the stream. Its diet is mainly mature aquatic insects. Out of 287 stomachs viewed the following contents were found; Plecoptera 1.0, Ephemeroptera 48.9, Trichoptera 10.8, Diptera 37.3, Miscellaneous 2.0. Based on its diet, it competes with Etheostoma blennioides, E. rfilineatum, and Cottus caroline. In all cases the mountain madtom is a nocturnal feeder and hides under large flat rocks during the day time. The entire genus Noturus has pectoral spines, some of which are serrated, some have a venomous sting, and some have both. The mountain madtom has both and these serve as an anti-predatory function, not to catch prey as previously thought. Human actions such as dam building can hurt mountain madtoms because they prefer fast flowing water.

== Life history ==
Juvenile mountain madtoms are 20–30mm in length usually. Adult mountain madtoms range from 75–127 mm in length and the life span averages 4–5 years. It is uncertain what age they reach sexual maturity due to the secrecy of the species. One study located a nest and eggs were collected. In the study the nest was found in a moderately flowing stream, in a clean swept gravel substrate under a rock, 20m above a riffle. A male mountain madtom was seen guarding the nest. The estimated clutch size is 55–115 eggs per female Relative to other fish the mountain madtom has a small clutch size because they do provide a lot of parental care to the young. The breeding season was determined to be June–July, based on the time the nest was found and how developed the eggs were. Human activity that puts silt in the streams can cause the eggs to suffocate which is detrimental to the population. The ideal temperature for the eggs to hatch is 24 C.

== Current management ==
In Tennessee the mountain madtom is listed as threatened. Nationally it is listed as apparently secure. There is currently no specific management in effect for the mountain madtom. There is, however, The Pigeon River Recovery Project. This project has reintroduced many species of darters, mussels, and the mountain madtom to the Pigeon River. At one time there was a mill that pumped waste into the Pigeon River that killed almost all the organisms downstream of the mill. Because of the secrecy of the mountain madtom, the exact causes of its decline are not known. However, since it is very sensitive to silt, poor logging practices at the turn of the century are believed to have been detrimental to the population. The mountain madtom is not a sport fish or pan fish and is not favored by fishermen, except for biologists doing research, so overfishing is not a problem. Nothing has ever been noted to prey on the mountain madtom, due to its venomous sting and spines, so predation is not a problem for it either.
