= Speckled madtom =

Conservation status
- Least Concern (IUCN 3.1)

Scientific classification
- Kingdom: Animalia
- Phylum: Chordata
- Class: Actinopterygii
- Order: Siluriformes
- Family: Ictaluridae
- Genus: Noturus
- Species: N. leptacanthus

Binomial name
- Noturus leptacanthus D. S. Jordan, 1877

Species of fish

The speckled madtom (Noturus leptacanthus) is a small freshwater fish found in the southeastern United States that belongs to the genus Noturus of the family Ictaluridae.

== Description ==
The speckled madtom is a dark reddish-brown color and has a dusky or mottled caudal fin with a pale border. The species' average length is between 39 and 50 millimetres (1.5 and 2.0 in); however, the longest ever recorded specimen was 110 millimetres (4.3 in).

== Distribution ==
The speckled madtom has a wide range throughout the southeastern United States. The species is found in abundance throughout Louisiana, Mississippi, Alabama, Georgia, Florida, South Carolina, and Tennessee. In Tennessee it is found only in the Conasauga River system, where it is abundant. It is also found in Atlantic and Gulf slope drainages from the Edisto River in South Carolina to the Amite-Comite River system of Louisiana. The St. Johns River system in the Florida peninsula makes up the southernmost area of their range.

== Ecology ==
The speckled madtom inhabits small to moderate-sized streams. They often inhabit very shallow riffles with sand, rock or gravel bottoms. During the day speckled madtoms will rest in areas with aquatic vegetation such as pondweed or burweed. However, due to their nocturnal feeding patterns, they will leave these areas at night to go feed. Feeding begins at dusk and the amount of food in their stomach will increase until dawn when the feeding stops. Their diet is mostly insect larvae, especially midge larvae. They detect their food with their sensory barbels, and their vision plays little part in their feeding behavior. Major competition for the speckled madtom comes from other species from the genus Noturus. The only known predators of the speckled madtom are the rock bass (Ambloplites rupestris) and larger Noturus species. In order to protect themselves from predation, all Noturus species have developed a venomous sting from their pectoral spines; however, the speckled madtom has a relatively low level of toxicity.

== Life history ==
The spawning period for the speckled madtom is from May through August with water temperatures ranging from 20 to 24 °C (68 to 75 °F). The speckled madtom is one of the least fecund species of freshwater North American fishes. They normally spawn two clutches per year with each clutch consisting of 14-45 eggs. Their eggs are very large relative to their body size, with the average size being 5.5 millimetres (0.22 in) in diameter. It is believed that the large egg size compensates for the extremely small clutch size. The large egg size allows for the larvae to be very large and well developed upon hatching. The average size of a one-year-old is 39 millimetres (1.5 in), and the average size of a 2-year-old is 50 millimetres (2.0 in). They reach sexual maturity by their second summer and have a maximum lifespan of 2.5–3 years. The speckled madtom is known to nest inside of discarded cans and bottles that are cleared of debris and silt by the male. The male then guards the eggs without feeding for around 2.5 weeks.

== Conservation ==
The population of this species is steady throughout its range and shows no signs of major decline. No widespread threats to the species are known. One study showed that the speckled madtom is more abundant in areas with agricultural land use, though agriculture has been known to hurt many species because of runoff. No agencies or non-governmental groups are actively protecting this species.
