= Scioto madtom =

Conservation status
- Extinct (2013) (IUCN 3.1)

- Presumed Extinct (2013) (NatureServe)

Scientific classification
- Kingdom: Animalia
- Phylum: Chordata
- Class: Actinopterygii
- Division: Teleostei
- Order: Siluriformes
- Family: Ictaluridae
- Genus: Noturus
- Species: †N. trautmani

Binomial name
- †Noturus trautmani W. R. Taylor, 1969

Extinct species of fish

The Scioto madtom (Noturus trautmani) was a species of fish in the family Ictaluridae. It is listed as extinct by the International Union for Conservation of Nature, which notes that it has likely been entirely or functionally extinct since 1957 given the lack of records since that year.

This fish was endemic to Ohio in the United States. Only one population was ever known; it was located in Big Darby Creek, a tributary of the Scioto River. Eighteen specimens were collected, all at one riffle in this creek, an area called Trautman's Riffle. It has not been seen since 1957.

It was proposed for removal from the list of endangered species by the U.S. Fish & Wildlife Service on September 30, 2021. It was removed on October 16, 2023, in accordance with the Endangered Species Act due to it being declared extinct.
