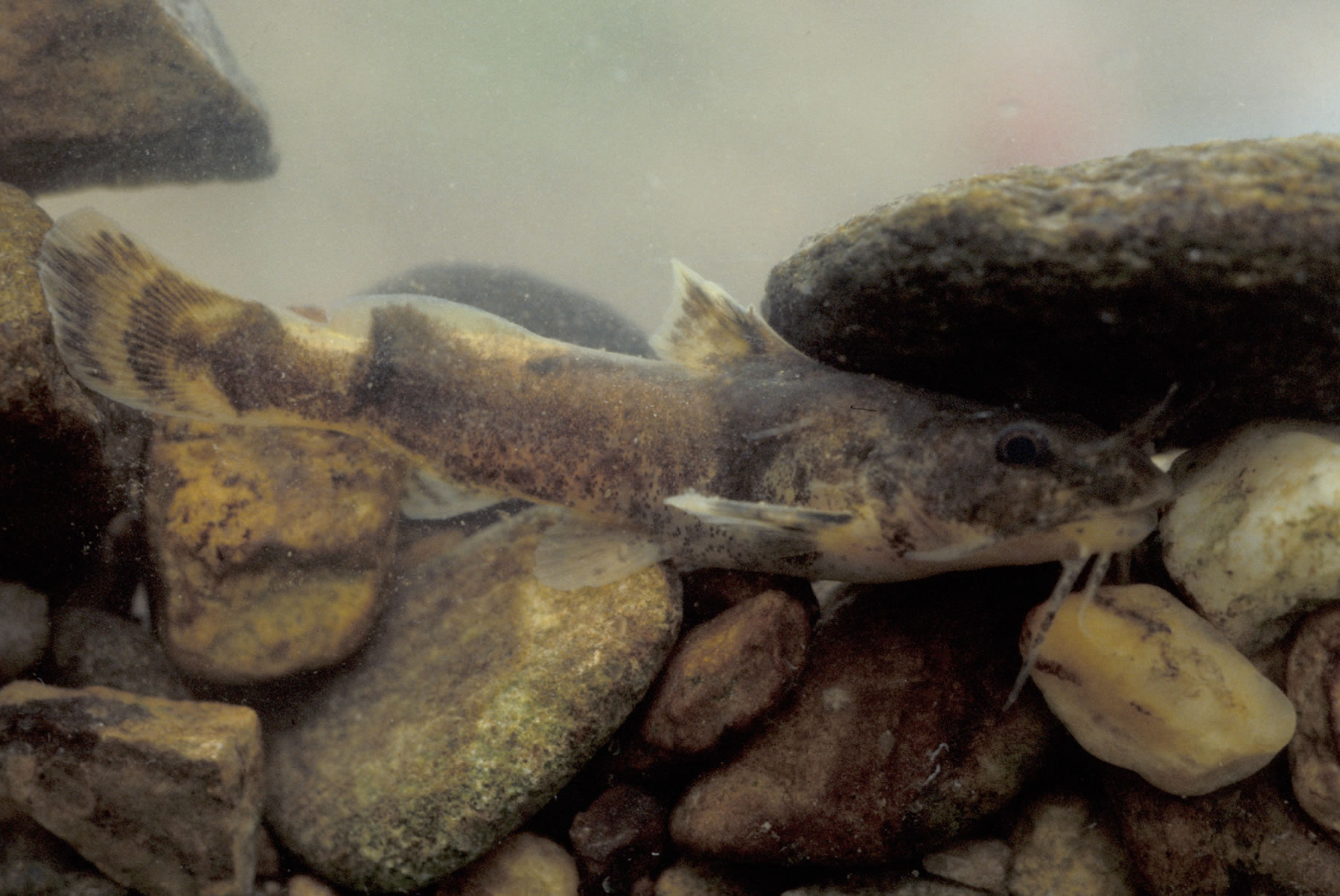

Conservation status
- Vulnerable (IUCN 3.1)

Scientific classification
- Kingdom: Animalia
- Phylum: Chordata
- Class: Actinopterygii
- Order: Siluriformes
- Family: Ictaluridae
- Genus: Noturus
- Species: N. munitus

Binomial name
- Noturus munitus Suttkus & W. R. Taylor, 1965

= Frecklebelly madtom =

Species of fish

The frecklebelly madtom (Noturus munitus) is a species of fish in the family Ictaluridae endemic to the United States. Madtoms are in the genus Noturus, which is a group of catfish prevalent in North America. In 2023, the Upper Coosa River distinct population segment (DPS) of N. munitus was listed as federally threatened under the Endangered Species Act of 1973.

== Description ==
The frecklebelly madtom is a robust, boldly patterned member of the monophyletic saddled madtom subgenus Rabida. Historically, the population thrived in large rivers in the Mobile Basin and Pearl River drainages in the southeastern United States. However, it is currently limited to the Gulf Coastal Plain rivers. The species lives exclusively in medium to large rivers free of sedimentation and over gravel shoals. They spawn between June and August while producing 50 to 75 mature eggs in a single clutch.

All madtom species, including N. munitus have experienced decline since the 1950s due to channelization, gravel mining, dredging, and siltation, which reduce the ability for the species to properly breed and survive.

== Distribution ==
N. munitus is a diminutive catfish with a disjunct distribution across the southeastern United States. It is historically known from the Pearl River drainage and the Upper Tombigbee River drainage in Mississippi and Louisiana, and the Alabama River and Cahaba River drainages in Alabama. However, it has been extirpated from the main channel of the Tombigbee and Alabama Rivers, and is currently limited to the Coastal Plain rivers. The species lives exclusively in medium to large rivers free of sedimentation and over gravel shoals. N. munitus has declined rapidly since the mid-1950s when river modification began. The loss of gravel substrates and increased levels of sedimentation due to poor agricultural practices have also affected the species. It is now reliably found in high numbers in only a few locations and is considered threatened with extinction.

== Ecology ==
The habitats of N. munitus and other Noturus species are very specific. They must have moving, cool water, with no sedimentation. Dams interrupt the water flows, and sedimentation can cover eggs, preventing them from hatching. Several large-river specialists were frequently collected with N. munitus, including Macrhybopsis sp.cf. aestivalis (speckled chub), Macrhybopsis storeriana (silver chub), Notropis uranoscopus Suttkus (skygazing shiner), Crystallaria asprella (crystal darter), Percina lenticula (freckled darter), and P. vigil (saddleback darter).

Since N. munitus is an opportunistic insectivore, like most of these fish, competition for food may be present in the ecology of the species. A diet analysis showed Bactidae nymphs (31%), Hydropsychidae larvae (20%), and Simuliidae larvae (20%) provided most of the food for N. munitus. Consequently, in the long run, managing for N. munitus would also benefit other species. However, another reason for decline that should be assessed is predators, but predators were hard to find. Like all madtoms, they are known for their pectoral spines that contain saw-like teeth and a neurotoxin gland. These spines and toxins produce a painful sting when used, and indicate the presence of predators.

=== Life history ===
N. munitus reproduction is similar to those of other madtom species. They spawn between June and August while producing 50 to 75 mature eggs in a single clutch. They also prefer to make homes in cavities under rocks. They use these cavities for spawning. The male locates and guards a suitable site while the female deposits the eggs. The male then protects the eggs from predators and keeps them clean until they hatch; sedimentation plays a big role in the decline of the species. It can cover the eggs and cause them to die. If successful, the young reach reproductive maturity during the second summer of life, and 2–3 years.

=== Current management ===
Of the 29 Noturus species, more than 50% are considered vulnerable, imperiled, or extinct, and many are likely in need of conservation action due to small ranges and increasing anthropogenic threats, such as: water impoundment, channelization, gravel mining, dredging, and siltation. These activities reduce the ability for the species to properly breed and survive. Its habitat specificity and lack of published research are also affecting further conservation actions. They are protected in Mississippi and Alabama, but not in Louisiana. The Alabama Forever Wild Land Trust has aimed to protecting habitat sites that would be used by N. munitus.

== Conservation ==
Conservation recommendations include:

- First, monitor the populations.
- Second, the habitats need to be protected. Human modification needs to be eliminated, and the development of riparian buffer zones should be encouraged. Riparian areas filter out excessive sedimentation and maintain erosion. These buffer zones could also increase insect abundance and larvae. N. munitus trophic ecology appears to be typical of other small benthic fishes, and aquatic insect larvae comprise the bulk of their diet.
- Third, further research of the species would be beneficial. Successful conservation of aquatic biodiversity in the future will depend on accurate knowledge of species habitat and life-history traits, the communities and ecosystems they occupy, recognition and description of evolutionary diversity within currently described species, and the ability of scientists to educate and involve more citizens in research and conservation efforts.
