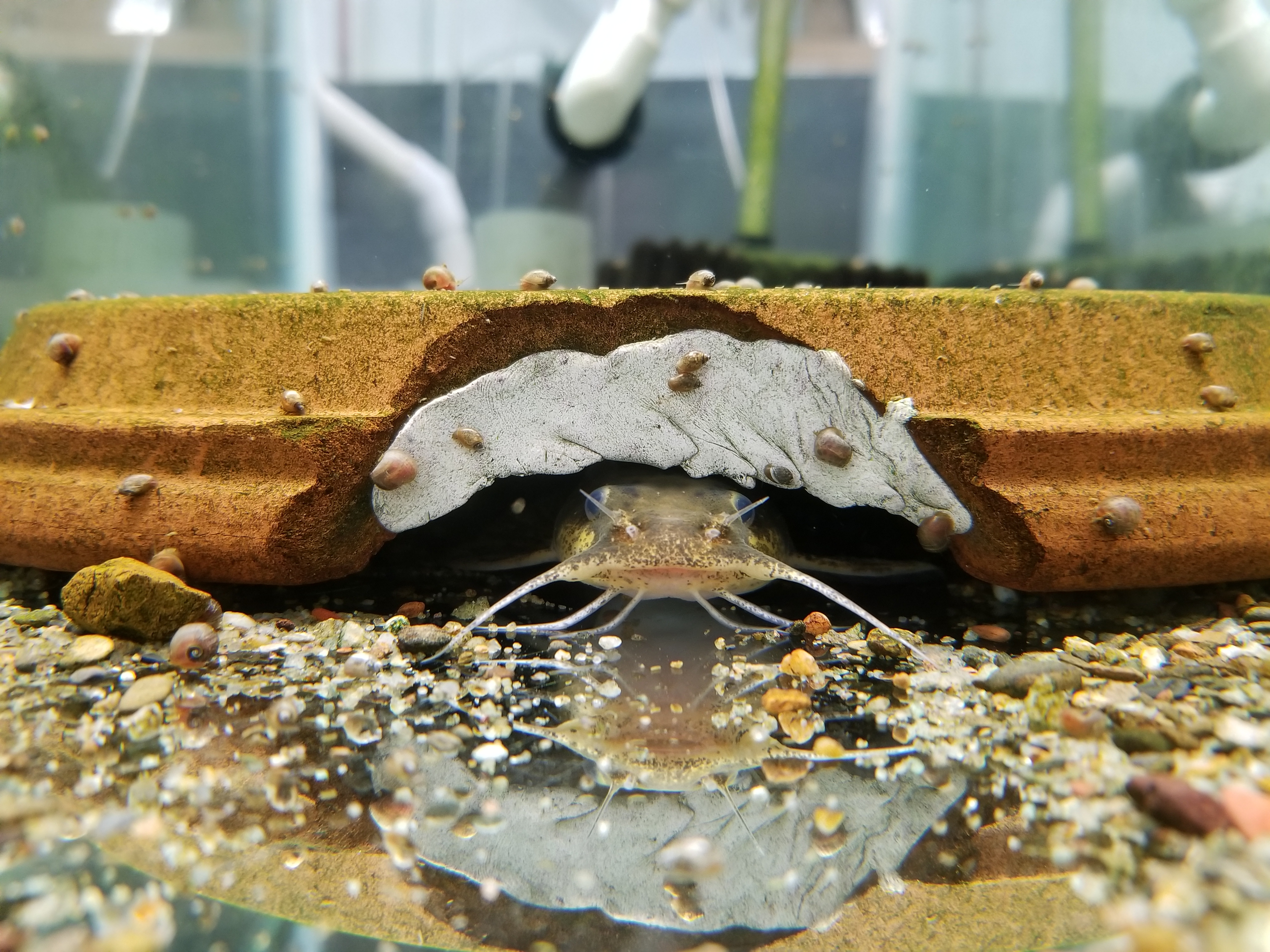

Conservation status
- Near Threatened (IUCN 3.1)

- Endangered (ESA)

Scientific classification
- Kingdom: Animalia
- Phylum: Chordata
- Class: Actinopterygii
- Division: Teleostei
- Order: Siluriformes
- Family: Ictaluridae
- Genus: Noturus
- Species: N. furiosus

Binomial name
- Noturus furiosus D. S. Jordan & Meek, 1889

Synonyms
- Noturus eleutherus Jordan & Brayton, 1878; Schilbeodes furiosus (Jordan & Meek, 1889)

= Carolina madtom =

Species of fish

The Carolina madtom (Noturus furiosus) is an endangered species of fish in the family Ictaluridae. It is endemic to North Carolina. It is a small catfish, reaching a maximum length of nearly five inches. Described in the late-1800s by ichthyologists Jordan and Meek, this fish is the only madtom that is endemic to North Carolina, as indicated by its common name.

== Appearance ==
When compared to other madtoms, the Carolina madtom has a short, chunky body and a distinct color pattern. Three dark saddles along its back connect a wide, black stripe along its side extending from its snout to the base of its tail. The adipose fin has a dark blotch that does not quite reach the fin's edge, giving the impression of a fourth saddle. Yellowish to tan blotches space the saddles, while the rest of the fish is tan. The belly is un-speckled, and the tail has crescent-shaped brown bands near its edge and center. Its pectoral spines have well-defined serrated (saw-like) projections along both margins. Stinging spines in its pectoral fins, earn this fish the "furiosus" title that is part of its scientific name.

== Habitat ==
The Carolina madtom lives in medium to large freshwater streams and rivers throughout the Piedmont and Coastal Plain areas, specifically in riffles, runs, and pools where there's a constant flow of water and a moderate gradient. They inhabit substrate which is stable, made up of gravel and cobble, and primarily free of any silt. Furthermore, they require the use of cover, such as under rocks, bark, mussel shells, and more, for their nesting areas.

Carolina madtoms have a relatively limited habitat distribution and population abundance, only being found in specific regions of the Tar and Neuse river basins of North Carolina. Because of this, they are classified as "Significantly Rare" in the Tar River basin and of "Special Concern" in the Neuse River basin according to the N.C. Natural Heritage Program.

=== Artificial cover units ===
In response to recent habitat degradation and cover loss, scientists have experimented with the use of implementing artificial cover units throughout the Tar and Neuse River basins. These artificial cover units are made up of terra cotta and aim to improve the habitat conditions for Carolina madtoms by providing them with adequate cover and protection. Studies have shown that Carolina madtoms effectively use these artificial cover units for reproduction, guarding eggs, and escaping from predators, suggesting that they could be helpful in the mitigation of habitat loss and the conservation of the species.

== Diet ==
The Carolina madtom is a sight feeder most active during the night, with peaks at dawn and dusk. It eats bottom-dwelling invertebrates such as larval midges, mayflies, caddisflies, dragonflies and beetle larvae.

== Life history ==
Female Carolina madtoms lay around 80 to 300 eggs each season while the male Carolina madtoms protect and watch over the eggs. Spawning season typically starts in May and may continue through July. Carolina madtoms fully mature at around two to three years old, and during their first two years of life, they grow to a length of roughly two inches. While their exact lifespan is currently unknown, Carolina madtoms live to at least four years old.

== Conservation challenges ==
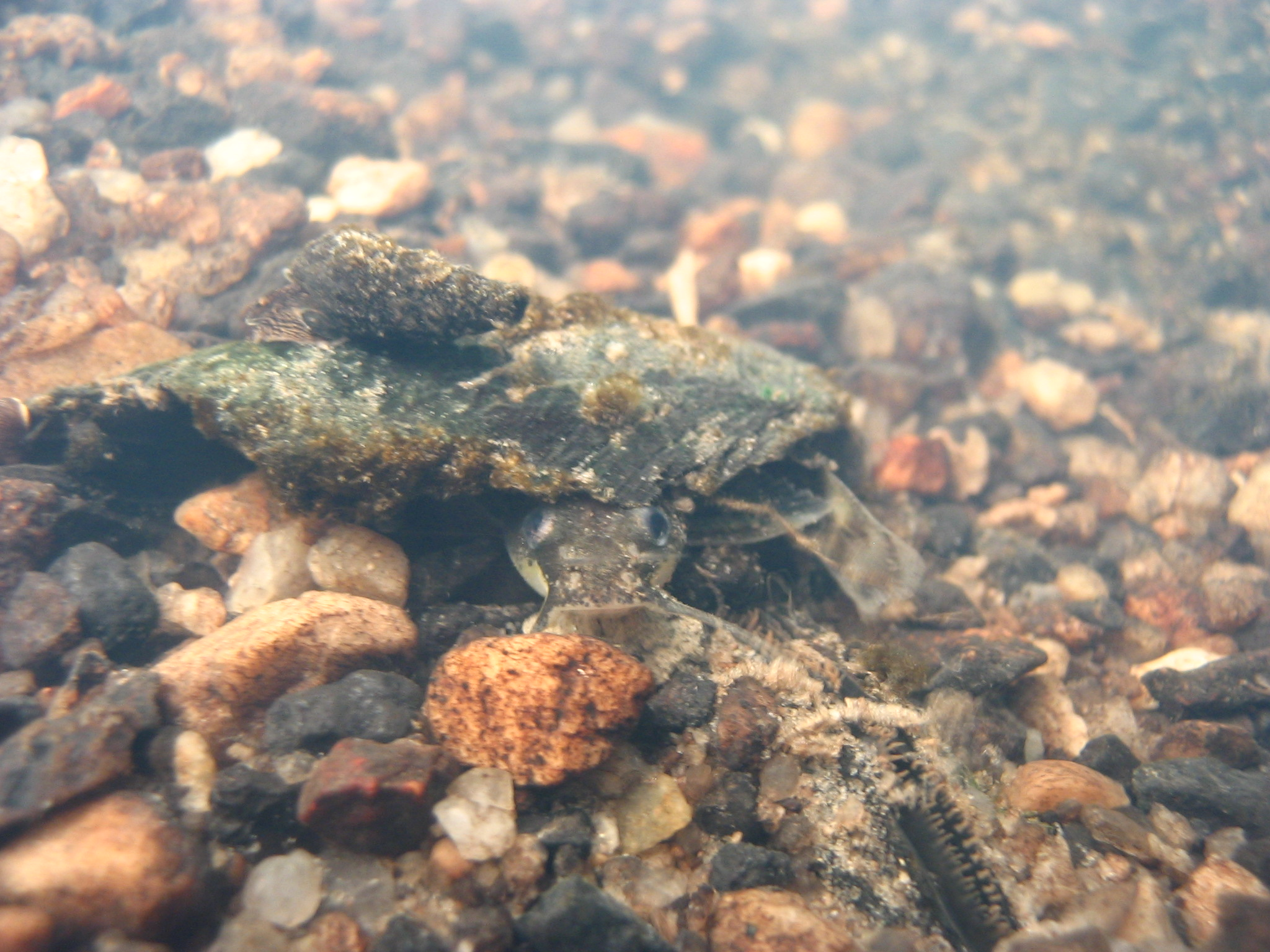
A hiding madtom

The Carolina madtom faces a variety of threats from declines in water quality, loss of stream flow, riparian and instream fragmentation, deterioration of instream habitats, and expansion of the invasive predator Flathead catfish. These threats are expected to be exacerbated by urbanization and climate change.

=== Pollution ===
The Carolina madtom needs clean, flowing water to survive. Human-caused increases in river water temperatures have been identified as a factor in the decline of the madtom.

=== Reduced stream flow ===
Drought and impoundments slow down the natural flow of streams, compromise water quality, hamper fish movement, limit available prey, and prevent waste and fine sediments from flushing out of the stream.

=== Agriculture and development ===
Streams with urbanized or agriculturally dominated riparian corridors tend to have more sediment in the water and unstable banks and/or impervious surface runoff, resulting in less suitable streams for fish as compared to habitat with forested corridors. For example, increased sedimentation can lead to less sunlight reaching the lower depths of the water. This negatively affects the growth and survival of plants and other primary producers, which Carolina madtoms and other species depend on for feeding and respiration. Increased sedimentation can also degrade the Carolina madtom's suitable habitat by filling in areas of cover.

=== Habitat fragmentation ===
Dams and perched or undersized culverts limit the madtom's ability to distribute throughout streams to find good quality habitat. For example, the construction of Falls Lake dam in the upper Neuse isolated Carolina madtoms in the upper basin from the middle Neuse basin. Isolated and fragmented habitats may separate individuals of a population and hinder their ability to reproduce with one another, resulting in decreased genetic diversity and overall fitness over time. In 2021, researchers discovered signs of low genetic diversity and potential population bottleneck events among sampled Carolina madtoms throughout the Tar and Neuse River basins. They also found evidence of genetic drift and inbreeding among populations.

=== Invasive species ===
The flathead catfish is an invasive top predator in the Neuse and Tar River basins, upon which no other creatures prey. They have been found to prey on Carolina madtoms, and evidence suggests that they could decrease native fish population by up to 50% via competition and predation. Furthermore, Hydrilla is an invasive, submerged aquatic plant that forms nearly impenetrable mats of stems and leaves at the surface of the water. It alters stream habitat, decreases flows, and contributes to sediment buildup in streams.
