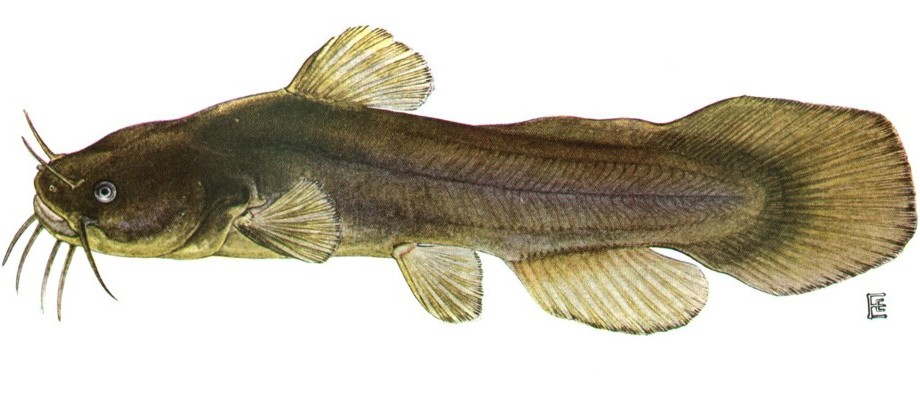

Conservation status
- Least Concern (IUCN 3.1)

- Secure (NatureServe)

Scientific classification
- Kingdom: Animalia
- Phylum: Chordata
- Class: Actinopterygii
- Division: Teleostei
- Order: Siluriformes
- Family: Ictaluridae
- Genus: Noturus
- Species: N. gyrinus

Binomial name
- Noturus gyrinus (Mitchill, 1817)

Synonyms
- Silurus gyrinus Mitchill, 1817; Schilbeodes gyrinus (Mitchill, 1817)

= Tadpole madtom =

Species of fish

The tadpole madtom (Noturus gyrinus) is a species of fish in the family Ictaluridae. It is native to Canada and the United States.

== Description ==
An adult tadpole madtom is typically 2–3 inches (50–80 mm), however they have been recorded at a length of 5 inches (130 mm). The tadpole madtom has a dark brown back with a lighter brown color on their sides and a yellow or white stomach. The pelvic and pectoral fins of adults are heavily covered in melanophores responsible for pigmentation, and the dorsal and anal fins contain fewer melanophores. There are also bands of melanophores on both the upper and lower jaws creating a dark horizontal streak along the side. Chin barbels vary from white to being lightly covered with melanophores. The tadpole madtom possess dark nasal and maxillary barbels and white mandibular barbels. Their adipose fin is completely connected to their large and round caudal fin, and their pectoral fin is not serrated. They possess 6–7 gill rakers; 6–7 dorsal rays; 15–18 anal rays; 7–9 pectoral rays; and 8–10 pelvic rays. The anal fin is of moderate length, but decreases with increasing body length. The tadpole madtoms also possess two pectoral spines through which an anti-predatory venom is transmitted. They have a terminal mouth with numerous small and sharp cardiform teeth. The teeth exist in numerous broad bands across the upper and lower jaw.

== Range and habitat ==
The tadpole madtom is found in parts of the U.S. and Canada. In Canada it is native to Manitoba, Ontario, Quebec, and Saskatchewan, and can be found in the Assiniboine, Saskatchewan, Souris, Red, English, Winnipeg, and Nelson rivers. The tadpole madtom's range in the United States is extensive, ranging from Texas to Florida and north along the Atlantic coast to New York. It can be found in the Mississippi River valley as well as the Great Lakes basin. In Minnesota it is present in all adjacent drainage systems to the Red River basin. In North Dakota it can be found in the Missouri river drainage. In South Dakota it is present in the eastern tributaries to the Missouri River, including the James River, as well as the Minnesota and Big Sioux river drainages. The tadpole madtom lives in areas with little to no current. They typically inhabit swamps and marshes, as well as lakes and slow moving streams and rivers 0.1–1.5 meters deep and 12–24 meters wide. They also prefer habitats with turbid water; a soft mud, sand or gravel bottom; and thick vegetation to use for crypsis.

== Diet ==
The tadpole madtom is an invertivore, planktivore, but also feeds on particulate. A Common food source for the tadpole madtom are immature insects and small crustaceans such as cladocera, ostracods, hyalella, and chironomids. Another popular food source is small crustaceans such as amphipods and isopods. Smaller fish feed more on small crustaceans while large fish tend to consume large prey such as worms and grass shrimp. Researchers in Wisconsin recorded the stomach contents of numerous tadpole madtoms and found an average diet consisting of 44% insects, 28.3% small crustaceans, 18.3% oligochaetes, 5.9% plants, 3% silt and debris, 0.1% snails, and 0.1% algae.

== Reproduction, life cycle ==
Due to the tadpole madtom's secretive nature, little is known of their spawning habits. In most areas the tadpole madtom spawn in June or July when the water temperature reaches 80 °F. Breeding males exhibit swelling of the lips and genital papillae as well as enlarged muscles on top of the head. Breeding tadpole madtoms do not build nests, but instead rely on any present solid substrate with which to attach their eggs. This generally includes things such as a rocks, logs, and vegetation. However, they have also been known to attach their eggs to submerged garbage such as pop cans. They have also been known to use abandoned crayfish burrows as a place to house their eggs. The female produces numerous clutches of eggs throughout breeding season, however not much is known of the number of clutches that they produce. Each clutch generally contains anywhere from 75 to 200 eggs. The male then guards the eggs until they hatch to ensure their safety.

== Conservation status ==
Tadpole madtom populations are secure in most areas. However, they are critically endangered in Pennsylvania, and they are on Kansas's list of species in need of conservation. Populations in Saskatchewan, New York, South Dakota, Oklahoma, Iowa, and Nebraska are considered vulnerable as well.

== Etymology ==
The tom segment of the name is used as another word for cat. There are two explanations proposed for the reasoning behind the mad segment of the name. One is that it refers to the venomous spines that it possesses; which maddens predators that get stuck by them. The alternative is that it refers to their habit of darting every which way when startled by predators. The tadpole segment of the name exists, because of their rounded caudal fin which gives them the appearance of a tadpole. Noturus (no-tour´-us) means "back tail" in Greek, which refers to the strip of skin which connects the tail and adipose fins. Gyrinus (jie-wren´-us) is Greek for tadpole.

== Literature cited ==
- Case, Brian E. 1970. An ecological study of the Tadpole Madtom in the Rat River, Manitoba, with special reference to movements and populations. MSc. thesis, University of Manitoba.
- Cochran, Philip A.(1996) 'Cavity Enhancement by Madtoms (Genus Noturus)', Journal of Freshwater Ecology, 11: 4, 521 – 522
- Pearse A. 1918. The food of the shore fishes of certain Wisconsin lakes. Bulletin of the Bureau of Fisheries 35:249–292.
- Whiteside, L.; Burr, B. 1986. Aspects of the life history of the tadpole madtom, Noturus gyrinus (Siluriforms: Ictaluridae) in southern Illinois. Ohio Journal of Science 86:153–160.
- Wright JJ. Adaptive significance of venom glands in the tadpole madtom Noturus gyrinus (Siluriformes: Ictaluridae). J Exp Biol. 2012 Jun 1;215(Pt 11):1816-23. doi: 10.1242/jeb.068361. PMID 22573760.
