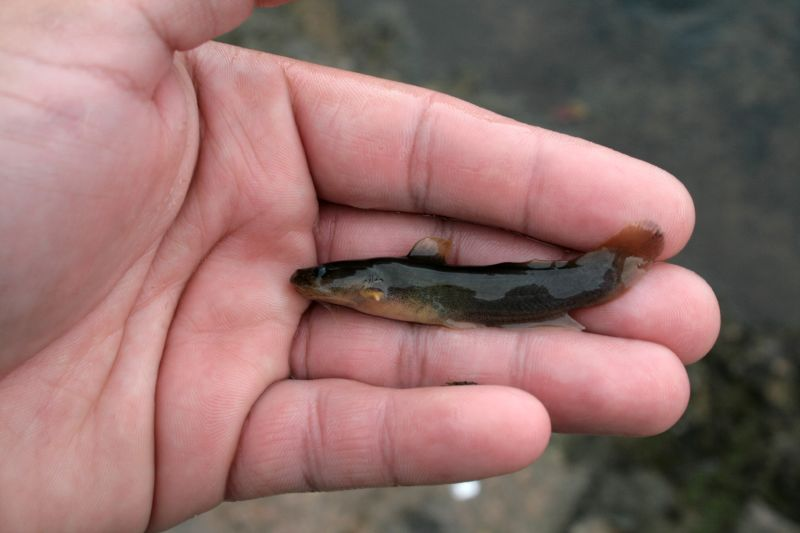

Conservation status
- Least Concern (IUCN 3.1)

Scientific classification
- Kingdom: Animalia
- Phylum: Chordata
- Class: Actinopterygii
- Order: Siluriformes
- Family: Ictaluridae
- Genus: Noturus
- Species: N. nocturnus

Binomial name
- Noturus nocturnus D. S. Jordan & C. H. Gilbert, 1886

= Freckled madtom =

Species of fish

The freckled madtom (Noturus nocturnus) a species of freshwater madtom (catfish) found in the eastern United States. The freckled madtom is a benthic feeder mostly of invertebrates and usually inhabits waters that are medium to large in size, living mostly in riffle areas that have mostly clear waters and rocky bottoms. Its spawning season occurs from spring to early summer in riffle areas, and sexual maturation occurs after two years.

== Geographic distribution ==
The freckled madtom is a freshwater species found across the eastern United States; it is common across most of its range. This range includes the Mississippi River basin and tributaries of the Gulf of Mexico in Alabama, Mississippi, Louisiana, and Texas. This species is also found in the lower Ohio River basin in Kentucky, Indiana, and Illinois. Other areas it is found include Oklahoma, southeastern Iowa, central Kansas, Arkansas, Georgia, and western Tennessee. Latitudinally it is found mostly between 41 and 30°N. This range has been identified since at least 1980; the current distribution is similar to the historical one, though some small extensions have been driven north, possibly as a result of global warming. This species is not known to travel often, especially over long distances. Further, its distribution is not entirely known due to its small population sizes and tendency to be easily misidentified. Freckled madtoms are often misidentified as bullheads or other catfish.

Further, the freckled madtom is said to be an intolerant species that sometimes disappears after a disturbance. These individuals are fluvial specialists, meaning they are specialized to a particular habitat, theirs being fast-moving riffle habitats. Human litter may be a potential disturbance to the species; young and breeding adult male individuals have often been found in beverage cans and other human-created debris. It may be difficult to determine range expansion, though, because of its small population sizes in certain areas, including central Oklahoma. However, freckled madtom distributions may have extended slightly as water quality in certain regions has improved.

== Ecology ==
The freckled madtom is known to inhabit fast-moving and permanently moving streams that are medium to large in size. The streams usually contain rocky bottoms. Further, this species is sometimes found in the vicinity of undercut banks near masses of sticks and roots.

The freckled madtom is primarily an invertivore (feeding on invertebrates). It uses ambush tactics in benthic regions largely at night to feed. It notably consumes insect larvae, including mayfly, black fly, caddisfly, and midge larvae. It also occasionally eats crustaceans. Though it is largely an invertivore, it has also been known to occasionally eat other fish. In southern Mississippi, evidence was found of freckled madtoms feeding on the smaller speckled madtom (N. leptacanthus). To aid in devouring victims, this catfish has venom glands along smooth spines on the pectoral and dorsal fins.

== Life history ==
The maximum reported size of the freckled madtom is 15 cm (5.9 in). One source lists the average size as 4.6 cm (1.8 in), and another source lists an average size range between 5 and 13.5 cm (2.0 and 5.3 in) long.

The maximum age reported is 4.0 to 4.5 years. Males become sexually mature by 2 years, most females by their second summer if not sooner, and polygamy is common among this species, as well as other Noturus species. Females produce an average of around 100 eggs per summer. The oocytes mature by late May to early July, and males guard the nests usually by late June. Optimal water temperature surrounding the nests is 25 °C (77 °F). Nests have been found under flat rocks, though still in the same fast-moving riffle areas this species inhabits.

== Conservation and management ==
The freckled madtom is not considered an endangered species at the federal level, and it is not found on the International Union for Conservation of Nature's endangered species lists. However, it has been listed as an endangered species in Iowa since 1984.
