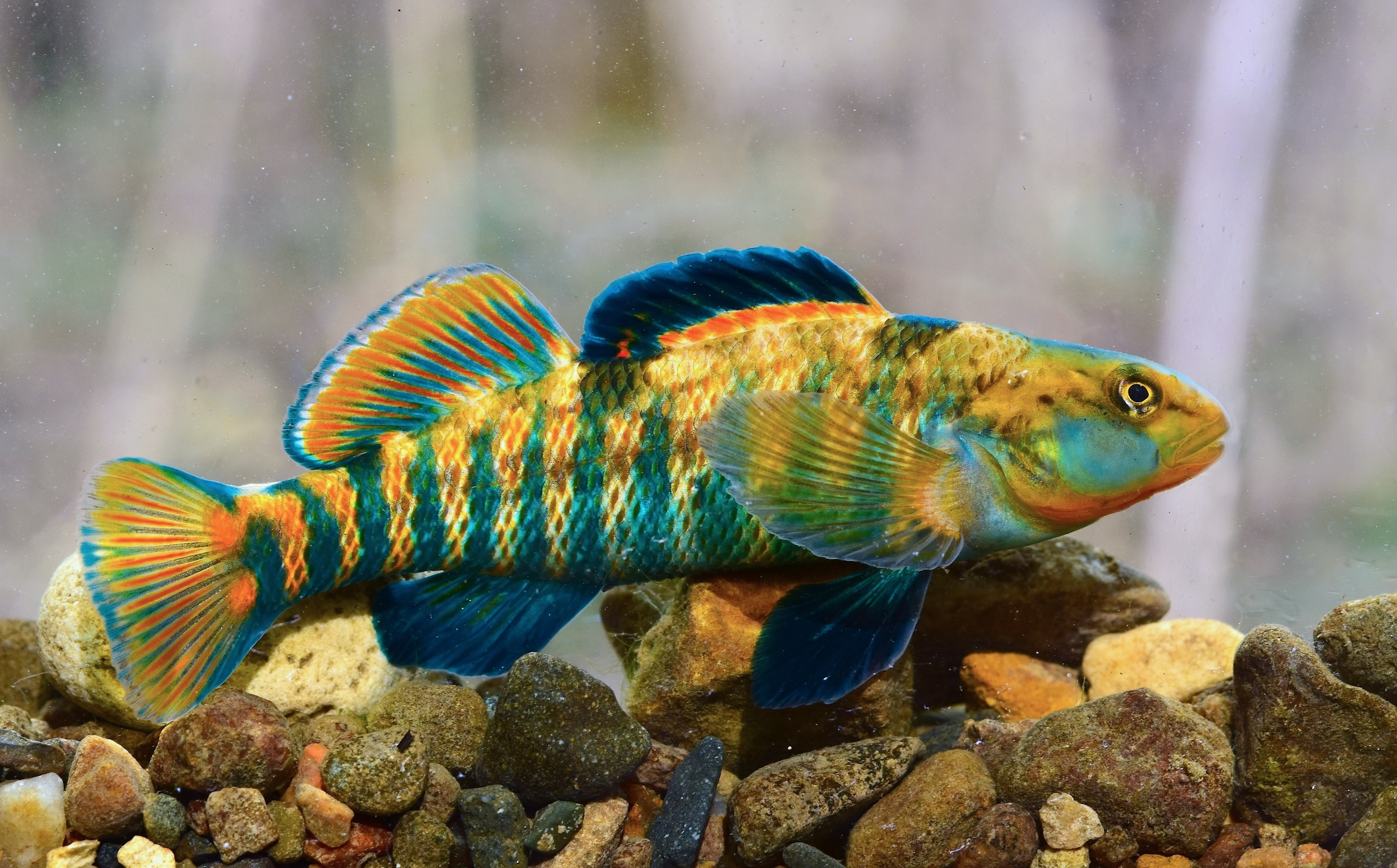

Conservation status
- Least Concern (IUCN 3.1)

- Secure (NatureServe)

Scientific classification
- Kingdom: Animalia
- Phylum: Chordata
- Class: Actinopterygii
- Order: Perciformes
- Family: Percidae
- Genus: Etheostoma
- Species: E. caeruleum

Binomial name
- Etheostoma caeruleum D. H. Storer, 1845

= Rainbow darter =

Species of fish

The rainbow darter (Etheostoma caeruleum) is a small species of freshwater ray-finned fish, a darter from the subfamily Etheostomatinae, part of the family Percidae, which also contains the perches, ruffes and pikeperches. It is native to North America where it is found in small, fast-moving streams and small to medium-sized rivers. It grows to 2 to 3 inches (51 to 76 mm) in length. The species is very sensitive to pollution and silt, staying in clean, pollution-free water. The rainbow darter is easily identified by three dark spots on the back, and blue and orange in the dorsal and anal fins.

== Life ==
The rainbow darter lives in clean, rocky riffles from March through June. It has a lifespan of about 4 years. The males can grow up to 48 mm long, while the largest female reaches just under 43 mm. The male form is resplendent in bright oranges and iridescent blue spots, stripes, and checks.

== Distribution ==
The rainbow darter is a small, benthic freshwater fish found in many creeks and small to medium-sized rivers throughout North America. In particular, it is common throughout the eastern United States, specifically throughout the Great Lakes and Ohio River Valley regions. Its distribution extends south to northern parts of Alabama and as far west as Missouri and Arkansas. This distribution has been suggested to be due to once existing glaciers and to its intolerance of brackish water. One study to examine the phylogeography of E. caeruleum and its colonization patterns found its distribution is greatly due to historic glaciations, and furthermore, due to distributions from drainages which have since then resulted in the current morphological diversity of the rainbow darter. Geographically, the rainbow darter is one of the most abundant and common darter species. Current distribution shown may be outdated and should be verified with state agencies.

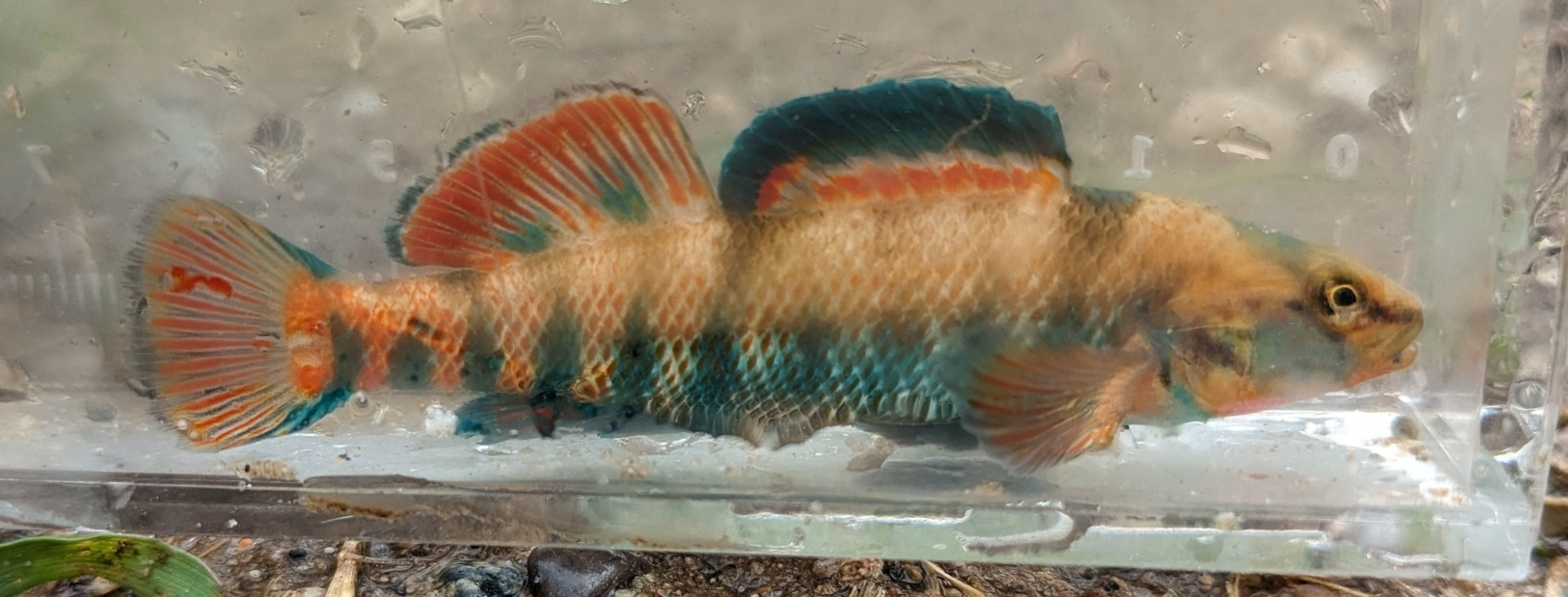
Michigan

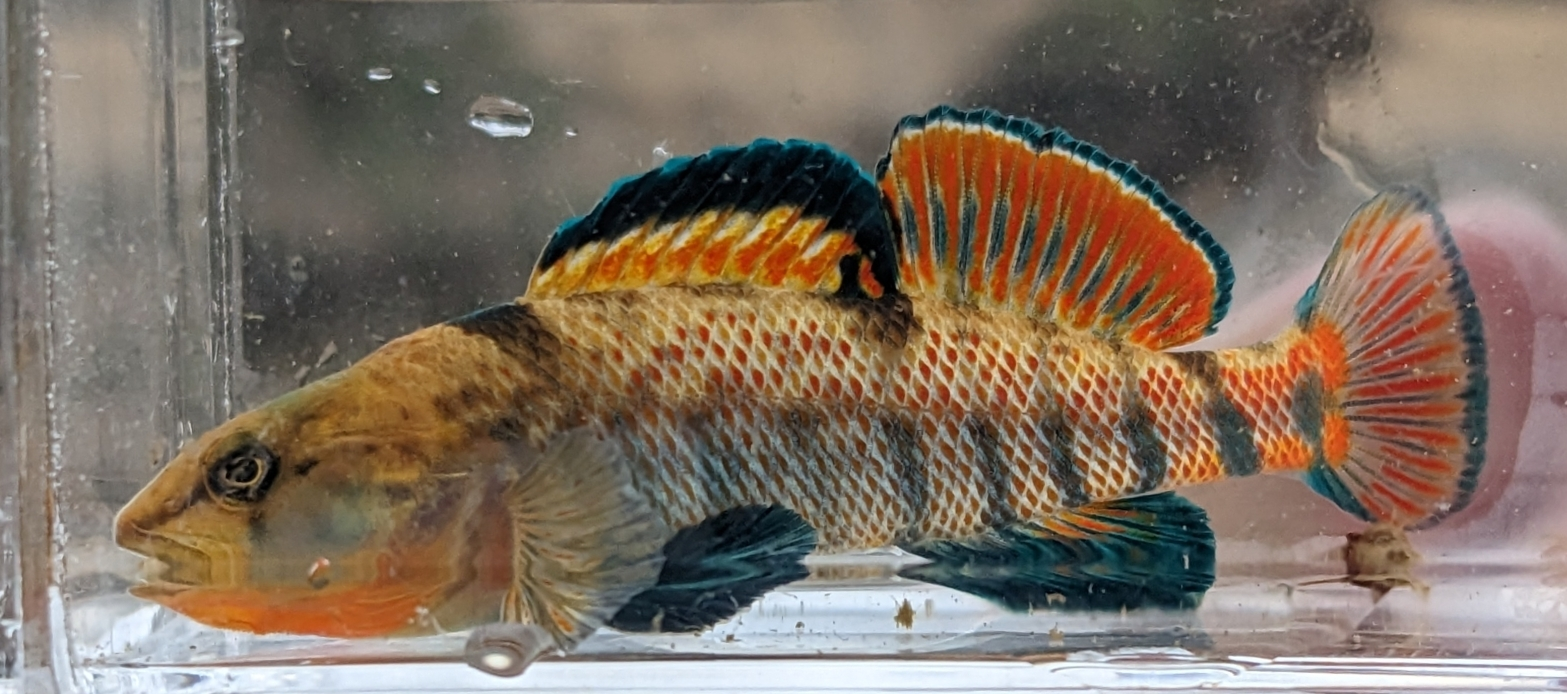
Tennessee

== Ecology ==
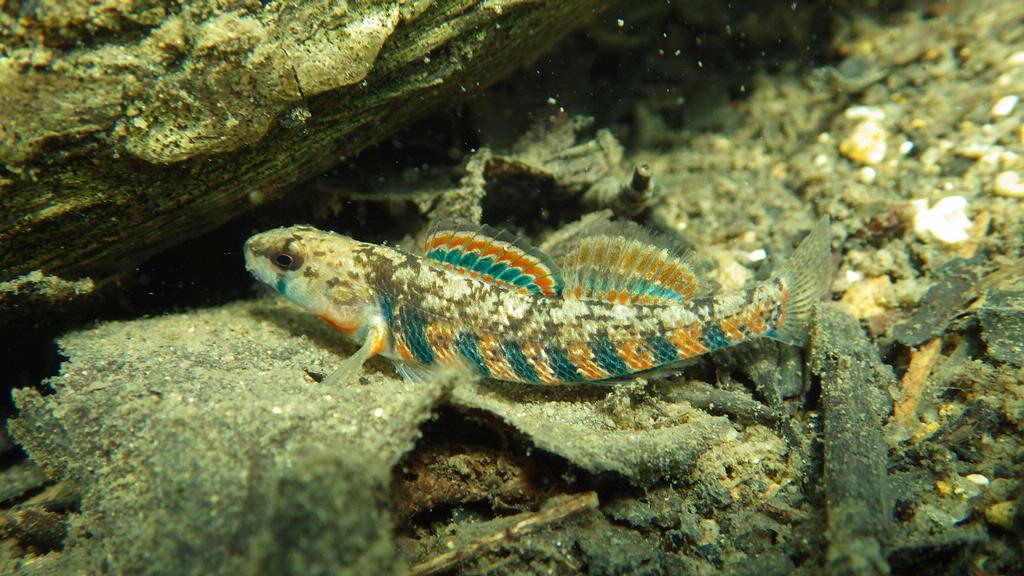
Rainbow darter

The rainbow darter is classified as insectivorous, feeding on small invertebrates such as insects and crayfish, but it has also been known to feed on some fly larvae. In Four-Mile Creek in Ohio, the rainbow darter lives primarily on trichopterans (i.e. caddisflies), having two feeding peaks: one in the morning and a second in the late afternoon or early evening.

The primary predators of the rainbow darter are larger freshwater fish, such as burbots (Lota lota), stonecats (Noturus flavus), and smallmouth bass (Micropterus dolomieu). Like many other darter species, it has the ability to maintain position on the substrate in flowing water. This unique characteristic plays a key role in its microhabitat preference. E. caeruleum has been shown to prefer creeks and rivers with rocky substrates and swift-moving riffles. This microhabitat preference has been suggested to be due to oxygen levels in the water during season changes or other factors, such as feeding or shelter-related habitat preferences. Because E. caeruleum has such a low tolerance for brackish water, human-induced changes such as pollution or sewer drainage has the potential to cause a significant negative impact on its abundance.

== Life history ==
Darters have a wide range of life histories, but size correlates with most life history characteristics. For example, larger darters grow faster, live longer, produce bigger clutches, and have longer reproductive spans. Mate selection by female darters is assumed to be common. When examining the rainbow darter, life history traits were: average size 45 mm, growth 32 mm, maximum age four years, and clutch size 82. E. caeruleum mates during the spring, typically when water temperature is between 17 and 18 °C, and they will leave their normal microhabitat in the rapids to congregate on pebbles, where the stream leaves a pool, to mate. Once mates are selected, the fish mate repeatedly for several days until the female lays about 800 eggs. This darter also displays group spawning, and the males tend to exhibit territorial behavior during the breeding season.

== Current management ==
Currently, the largest threat to E. caeruleum is run-off and pollution due to the population shift from rural to urban areas. One study found the development of an interstate highway negatively affected the abundance of several fish species, including E. caeruleum, because of decreasing quality of water of the nearby creek. Currently, management plans consist of reducing nutrient, pesticide, and sediment loadings within such streams. This same study suggests conservation practices should be a combination of both physical habitat monitoring and water chemistry monitoring, because it would benefit fish communities within headwater streams more than just implementing one conservation practice or the other. Although broad management plans are in place for many rivers and streams and their fish communities as a whole, no current management plans in place are specifically designed for E. caeruleum.
