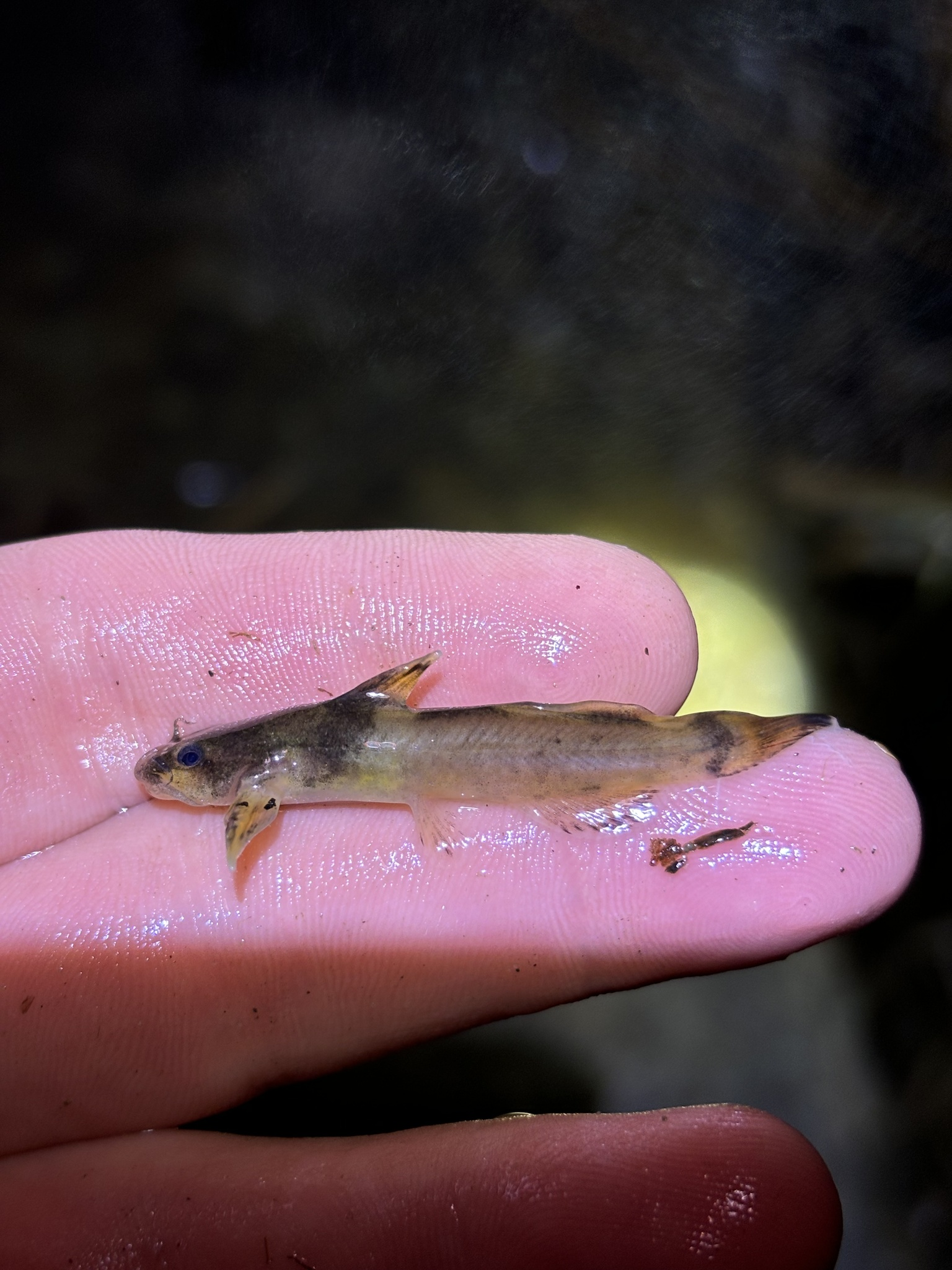

Conservation status
- Near Threatened (IUCN 3.1)

Scientific classification
- Kingdom: Animalia
- Phylum: Chordata
- Class: Actinopterygii
- Order: Siluriformes
- Family: Ictaluridae
- Genus: Noturus
- Species: N. stigmosus

Binomial name
- Noturus stigmosus W. R. Taylor, 1969

= Northern madtom =

Species of fish

The northern madtom (Noturus stigmosus) is a freshwater fish.

== Ranges and habitat ==
N. stigmosus can be found in the Ohio River valley stretching into distinct locations in Canada, where it is considered endangered. It is a fairly rare species with little data available because such small numbers are observed. The northern madtom prefers habitats with relatively swift currents along with sand, silt, or rocky substrates. The species begins spawning around 23 °C, which is sometime in early summer throughout its range. It is a cavity nester and builds its nests under large rocks and logs. Presently, not much is known about the ecology or life history of this species because it is found in such small numbers throughout its range.

The species can survive in waters with some turbidity, but not in waters with a high amount of sediment pollution. One of the leading management actions aiding in the successful reproduction of this species is keeping the waters void of sediment pollution and habitat alterations.

The northern madtom is also found along the Allegheny River system running from Canada through the Northeastern United States to Tennessee. However, over much of its range, the species is found in only a few streams/creeks in each state. In Canada, the species is confined to only four distinct locations: St. Clair River, Lake St. Clair, Thames River (Ontario), and Detroit River. The population status of these four locations has been classified as poor by Fisheries and Oceans Canada.

In Pennsylvania, the northern madtom is only found in one creek on the far western edge of the state. Because of this restricted distribution across most of its range, the species has been labeled as critically imperiled. In Tennessee, the species is more common and is classified as vulnerable, instead. However, the Tennessee Wildlife Resources Agency places the northern madtom on the "Wildlife in Need of Management Proclamation" list. The sporadic distribution of the species across its range suggests that the northern madtom probably has very specific habitat requirements, so is vulnerable to habitat alterations.

== Ecology ==
The diet of the northern madtom consists of small insects and invertebrates. However, because the species is found in such small numbers, no real evidence supports the specifics of their diet. Little is known as to the quality or quantity of what the northern madtom eats.

The northern madtom is found in different habitats throughout its range. In the northern extent of its distribution, the species is found more in larger rivers and even in a few lentic environments such as Lake St. Clair. However, in the lower most stretches of its range, such as in Tennessee, the species is generally more common in small creeks and streams with a somewhat moderate current. Across all regions, the species tends to prefer habitat with sand, gravel, or rock substrates. The species is somewhat tolerant of turbidity, but avoids areas of high siltation.

The northern madtom shares its habitat with several similar species ranging from the very similar mountain madtom to some invasive species, which create competition for both food and resources. However, not much is known about the specifics of the effect of this competition on the northern madtoms because they are found in such small numbers.

== Life history ==
Both sexes of N. stigmosus come into reproductive condition in early summer. However, spawning does not take place until the water temperature reaches 23 °C. The species is thought to produce only one clutch per year with an average clutch size of 32 to 160 eggs. The wide range of clutch size can possibly be caused by females laying eggs in multiple nests. The northern madtom is a cavity-nesting species; they have been found in depressions under large rocks, logs, and inside crayfish burrows. Their nests have also been found inside anthropogenic debris such as bottles, cans, and boxes.

Males guard the eggs, and when the eggs hatch, the adult males continue to guard them for around one month. In Canada, the juveniles are found mainly in areas with a water temperature between 19.5 and 28 °C, a pH of 8.03 to 8.47, a dissolved oxygen content between 6.0 and 10.05, a depth between 0.06 and 0.90 meters, and a near bottom velocity between 0 and 0.55 meters per second. Although this sounds like very specific data, the many species fall into this data set, and little is known about the specifics of the northern madtom's life history.

== Current management ==
Noturus stigmosus is listed as "vulnerable" on the federal level. However, throughout the majority of its distribution, especially in the northern region, many states have it classified as "critically imperiled". The reason for this is the sporadic distribution and small numbers associated with the species. These characteristics also show that the northern madtom probably has very specific habitat parameters is probably very sensitive to habitat alterations.

One of the main causes for the decline of the northern madtom is loss of suitable habitat. Several factors contribute to this, ranging from the changing of the landscape for anthropogenic purposes to the building of small dams in the creeks where the species occurs. Increases in the amount of stream siltation are also believed to have negative impacts on the species.

Because so little information is available regarding the habitat requirements and life history strategies of N. stigmosus, little to no management is occurring that specifically targets the species. The current management practices consist of attempting to conserve the species natural habitat through maintaining stream flow, avoiding bank erosion and soil deposition, and altering stream bank habitat. Individual counts are conducted via seining and trapping. However, because the species is so rare in the northern portion of its range, not much is learned from these collections.
