= Noturus hildebrandi =

Least madtom

Conservation status
- Least Concern (IUCN 3.1)

Scientific classification
- Kingdom: Animalia
- Phylum: Chordata
- Class: Actinopterygii
- Order: Siluriformes
- Family: Ictaluridae
- Genus: Noturus
- Species: N. hildebrandi

Binomial name
- Noturus hildebrandi (R. M. Bailey & W. R. Taylor, 1950)

Synonyms
- Schilbeodes hildebrandi Bailey & Taylor, 1950

Species of fish

Noturus hildebrandi, also known as the least madtom, is a species of catfish. Its native range stretches from the Obion River in Kentucky to the Homochitto River in Mississippi.

== Description ==
The least madtom is a small slender-bodied fish with a flat head. It measures up to 6.9 centimetres (2.7 in) in length. The adipose fin is either clear or white; however, populations in Mississippi sometimes have a dark patch on the adipose fin. Body coloration varies by geography. There are two known subspecies, Noturus h. hildebrandi and Noturus h. lautus. N. h. hildebrandi, which inhabits the Homochitto River and Bayou Pierre, has a long head and a mottled coloration. N.h. lautus lives in the Obion and surrounding rivers; this subspecies has a shorter head and four light-colored oval areas on a red-brown to black back. Males and females are identical in appearance. Most live about 12 to 15 months, dying shortly after reproducing.

== Habitat ==
The least madtom inhabits sandy riffles, mixed rock riffles, creeks, pools, and small rivers. It is commonly found in shallow areas containing submerged logs, sticks, leaves, and other debris.

== Reproduction ==
The least madtom's spawning season lasts from June through August. During this time the males increase in size. The females spawn during their second summer. To prepare for spawning, adults take shelter, either singly or in pairs, under stones, shells, or in debris. An average of 19 orange oocytes are laid in these areas. Both parents guard the nest as the eggs develop. Eggs hatch within 8 to 9 days. Yolk resorption takes about 9 to 10 days after hatching.

== Diet ==
The least madtom's diet consists of 16 different invertebrate taxa. Midges make up the majority of their diet, followed by caddisfly larva. Crustaceans are consumed only in late winter and early spring. The size of prey is proportional to body size.
