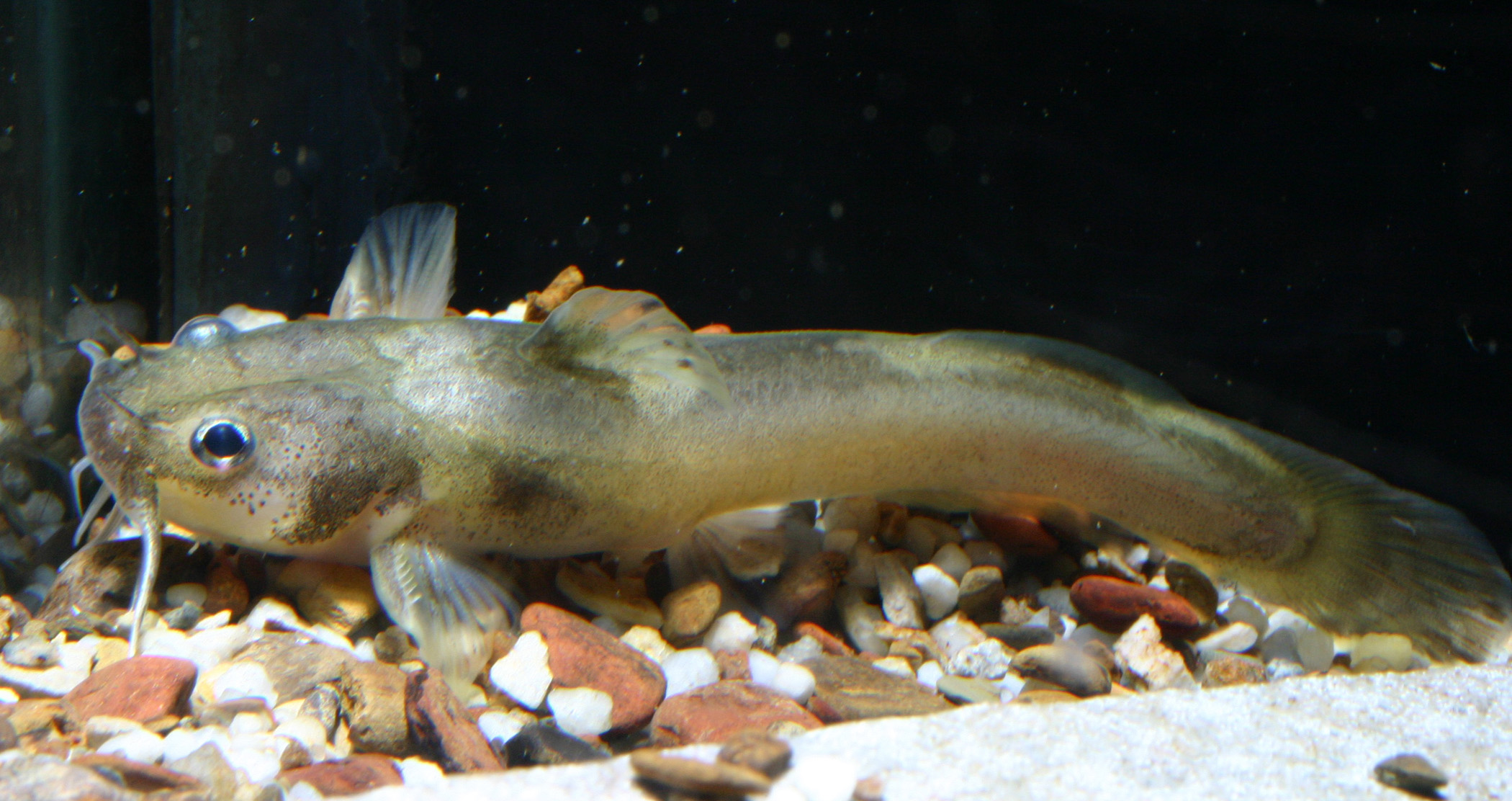

Conservation status
- Critically Endangered (IUCN 3.1)

- Endangered (ESA)

Scientific classification
- Kingdom: Animalia
- Phylum: Chordata
- Class: Actinopterygii
- Division: Teleostei
- Order: Siluriformes
- Family: Ictaluridae
- Genus: Noturus
- Species: N. crypticus

Binomial name
- Noturus crypticus Burr, Eisenhour & Grady, 2005

= Chucky madtom =

Species of fish

The chucky madtom (Noturus crypticus) is a critically endangered freshwater fish endemic to the U.S. state of Tennessee.

It has been observed in two streams in eastern Tennessee, Little Chucky Creek and Dunn Creek. It was described to science as a new species in 2005. It is in the N. elegans clade.

== Appearance and anatomy ==
Chucky madtoms can grow up to 7.4 centimeters (2.9 inches). The dorsal side of this fish consists of three dark blotches with pale saddles in front of each blotch.

== Distribution ==
The chucky madtom has an extremely small distribution and is only known from two streams in the French Broad river system in eastern Tennessee. In 1940, one specimen was found in Dunn Creek in Sevier County. No other individuals have been recovered from that location despite suitable habitat and a healthy fish population, potentially indicating that the population in Dunn Creek has been extirpated. Fourteen chucky madtoms have been collected from Little Chucky Creek in Greene County, the last of which was found in 2004. It is not known why these two small streams are the only place where the species is found, as there is similar habitat along portions of the Little Chucky Creek. Further conventional capture surveys of surrounding areas with suitable habitat did not yield any more specimens. However, eDNA sampling in 2023 and 2024 detected chucky madtom DNA in both creeks, yielding the first evidence for the potential persistence of the species in decades.

== Life history and ecology ==
Due to the small range and lack of specimens, little is known about the life history of the chucky madtom. There is currently no information about diet, predators, spawning times, fecundity, or sex ratio. The low species count and protected status of this species makes it challenging for researchers to examine the diet of this species. Although exact life history details are unknown, the chucky madtom may exhibit some of the same life history traits as other Noturus species, including spring or summer spawning, low fecundity, cavity nesting, nest guarding, and a diet primarily consisting of aquatic macroinvertebrates.

The chucky madtom requires clear and slow to moderate flowing water in stream runs. All collected specimens were found in areas where the dominant substrate included gravel, cobble, or rock slabs. Other fish species found during chucky madtom surveys include the central stoneroller, banded sculpin, greenside darter, redline darter, and banded darter.

== Threats ==
Threats to the chucky madtom include poor water quality, erosion, pollution (especially sedimentation), habitat degradation, and riparian habitat destruction associated with agricultural land use in the area. Moreover, non-native species such as the virile crayfish (Faxonius virilis) and Kentucky river crayfish (Faxonius juvenilis) may compete with chucky madtoms for habitat and prey upon small individuals.

== Current management plan ==
The chucky madtom was listed as a federally endangered species in 2011. Prior to federal listing, a captive breeding program was established by Conservation Fisheries, a Knoxville-based non-profit focused on captive breeding and reintroduction of non-game fish. Conservation Fisheries capture one male and one female in 2004, but was unsuccessful at captive propagation following the female's death soon after capture. No other attempts have been made to breed the species, as no individuals have been found since. Currently, the U.S. Fish and Wildlife Service's final recovery plan for the species includes such methods as capturing and rearing broodstock, protecting and improving habitat within Little Chucky Creek, local outreach, education, and awareness.

A 2024 status review of the species from U.S. Fish and Wildlife Service recommended no change in status.
