= Smoky madtom =

Conservation status
- Vulnerable (IUCN 3.1)

Scientific classification
- Kingdom: Animalia
- Phylum: Chordata
- Class: Actinopterygii
- Order: Siluriformes
- Family: Ictaluridae
- Genus: Noturus
- Species: N. baileyi

Binomial name
- Noturus baileyi W. R. Taylor, 1969

Species of fish

The smoky madtom (Noturus baileyi) is a species of catfish. Little information exists about the smoky madtom, along with other members of the Noturus species, due to the high turbidity in which they spawn, preventing observation, as well as their nocturnal behaviors.

== Description ==
The madtom is a small member of the family Ictaluridae, only reaching a maximum of 5 cm (2 in) long. It is olive brown on top with white to yellow below. Four saddles line the back of this species.

== Distribution ==
The smoky madtom is endemic to Abrams Creek in the Great Smoky Mountains National Park, Tennessee. In 1957, Chilhowee Dam was closed and an ichthyocide was administered to Abrams Creek, in an attempt to improve trout fishery. Extirpation of the smoky madtom resulted. The smoky madtom was presumed extinct until in 1980, when another population was found in Citico Creek in the Cherokee National Forest within Monroe County, Tennessee. In 1986, a restoration project was begun to restore this native population. Efforts include collecting egg masses from Citico Creek, rearing them in the lab, and reintroducing them into Abrams Creek after a year.

== Ecology ==
The smoky madtom is a very secretive catfish. During the day, it buries itself under gravel. It is nocturnal and feeds at night on aquatic invertebrates and small fish. It prefers areas of transition between pools and riffles and spawns in the summer under large, flat rocks. Specimens have been collected in areas of transition between pools and riffles in depths around 25 cm (10 in). In the winter and spring, it seems to prefer more gentle runs and pools. The area also includes large boulders for the madtom to hide under, which it has been documented to do when disturbed at night. The water is clear and its temperature is also intermediate between cold and cool water. Stream width is about 4–10 m (13–32 ft). Smallmouth bass have been recorded preying on the smoky madtoms. Noturus species can be used as an indicator of the environment because they are very susceptible to changes. Human disturbances such as logging, mining, and cattle grazing can cause siltation of the water and drop the populations dramatically.

The female madtom reaches maturity after two years. Spawning happens once per year, and on average 30 eggs are produced. The life expectancy is 4 years, allowing only 2 years of reproduction, with a total of 72 eggs. This low reproduction, coupled with extirpation and low tolerance, has led the smoky madtom to be federally listed as endangered. The average spawning season is between June and July. The male, like other catfish, defends its nest. The muscles of the head also swell during the breeding season. Siltation plays a vital role in whether the species will reproduce. Too much silt in the water smothers the eggs.

== Management ==
In 1984, the population was as low as 500-1,000 fish due to a combination of building the Chilhowee Dam, poisoning the creek, and degrading the stream by livestock and tourists. The restoration project in 1986 required the help of the North Carolina Wildlife Resources Commission, the Tennessee Wildlife Resources Agency, the US Fish and Wildlife Service, the US Forest Service, the National Park Service, and the University of Tennessee. Since the population was so low, the risk of stocking live fish into Abrams Creek was too high. Egg masses were collected during the spawning season and reared in the lab. The young were released after one year. They were also released at night to minimize predation risk and help them get used to their surroundings. Since then, 10 to 20 clutches have been removed from Citico Creek and a total of 3,167 stocked in Abrams Creek. The average survival is 55%. Since 1990, observations of smoky madtom in Abrams Creek have been increasing. In 2002, 43 of 56 were young-of-year, indicating successful spawning.
