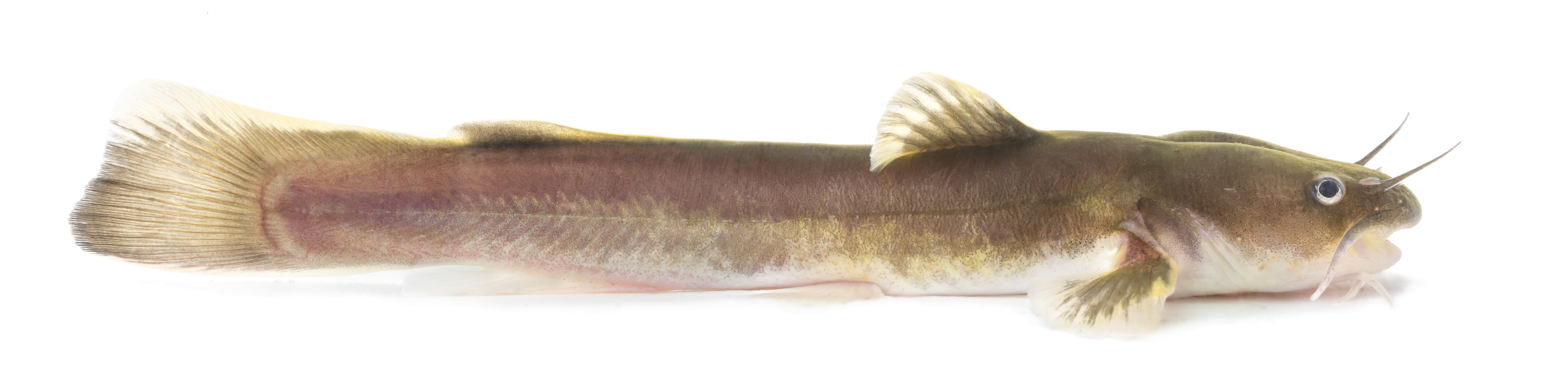

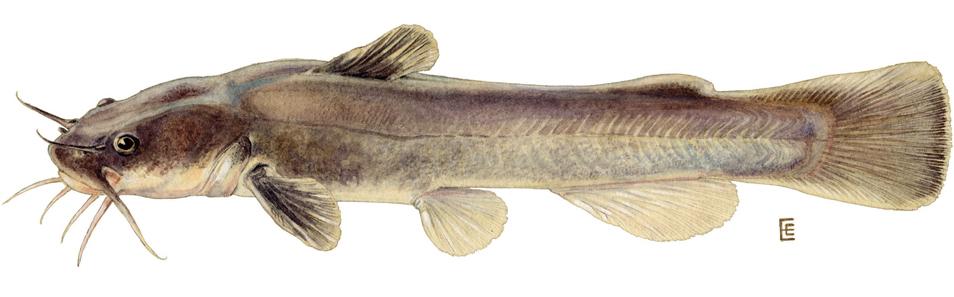

Conservation status
- Least Concern (IUCN 3.1)

Scientific classification
- Kingdom: Animalia
- Phylum: Chordata
- Class: Actinopterygii
- Order: Siluriformes
- Family: Ictaluridae
- Genus: Noturus
- Species: N. flavus

Binomial name
- Noturus flavus Rafinesque, 1818

= Noturus flavus =

Stonecat

Species of fish

Noturus flavus, the stonecat, is a North American freshwater catfish of the family Ictaluridae. The common name is due to its habit of hiding near or under stones in fast-moving water.

== Anatomy ==
Stonecats are small, slender, flat-headed catfishes, with the adipose fin keel-like and continuous with the caudal fin except for a shallow notch. While the dorsal and pectoral spines of most members of this family cause wounds that irritate, the stonecat has venom glands, particularly on the bases of the pectoral spines, that cause extreme pain similar to that of a wasp sting. The pectoral fin lacks any posterior serrae. Anal fin rays number 15 to 18, pectoral fin rays 9 to 11, and pelvic fin rays 8 to 10. The caudal fin rays number 55 to 67.

The upper jaw projects beyond the lower jaw and the tooth pad on the upper jaw has a narrow, crescent-shaped extension on each side. The premaxillary band of teeth has lateral backward extensions.

The skin of the stonecat is thick and is yellowish-brown in color. The sides of the head shade to yellow. The belly is whitish.

The stonecat has two forms. In the Cumberland drainage in Tennessee, a scientifically undescribed form possesses two light bars (perpendicular to body length) on its nape. In other areas, a patch exists in place of the bars. In both forms, the stonecat has a white spot at the rear of the dorsal fin base and one on the upper edge of the caudal fin. The rear of the pectoral spine has either no or a few weak teeth.

== Size/age ==
Stonecats typically reach four to eight inches in length, but can reach 12 inches, at weights of 0.22 to 1.1 lbs. Typically, Stonecats live five to six years.

== Distribution ==
The stonecat has a widespread distribution. Stonecats exist in the Great Lakes, the St. Lawrence River, drainages of Hudson Bay, and the Mississippi River basin. Stonecats can also be found from the Hudson River drainage of New York west to the Red River drainage of Hudson Bay. Stonecats inhabit the drainage of the Mississippi River basin from Quebec to Alberta, southerly to northern Alabama and Mississippi and westerly to northeastern Oklahoma. In Colorado, stonecats are present in St. Vrain Creek near Longmont, Colorado and in the Republican River south of Wray, Colorado.

== Ecology ==
=== Habitat ===
Stonecats live in freshwater environments, and are found from large creeks to small rivers. They occasionally are found in tiny creeks, or rivers as large as the Lower Mississippi. Stonecats occupy gently to fast-moving riffle areas with rocky substrates. They spend the majority of their time in moderate-moving, shallow riffles, but can also be found in deeper water (2 to 3 meters deep). Stonecat inhabit natural lakes, such as Lake Erie, where it prefers rock and gravel bars that are subject to significant wave action.

=== Diet ===
The stonecat is a benthic, opportunistic feeder, using its sensitive barbels during the night to search for food on the river bottom. Stonecats eat a diversity of food items, such as aquatic insect larvae (e.g., mayflies), mollusks, minnows, fish eggs, isopods, amphipods, crayfish, plant material, worms and chilopods.

=== Reproduction ===
Females mature in three to four years and a mean standard length of 4.7 inches. Stonecats form monogamous pairs for breeding, and spawn when water temperatures reach 25 °C. Clutches are guarded by males under large, flat rocks in pools or crests of riffles. Rocks used as spawning cover averaged 200 square inches and were found in water depths averaging 34 inches. The eggs are amber-yellow and are very large, ranging between 3.5 and 4 mm in diameter, with the whole egg mass enveloped by a gelatinous material. A female stonecat may produce between 200 and 1,200 eggs per year. Stonecats exhibit parental care, with the male or both sexes guarding the clutch, until the young head to shallower, calmer streams and waters to mature.

== Etymology ==
The genus name Noturus, meaning "back tail", refers to the fusion of the adipose and caudal fins. The specific epithet flavus meaning "yellow", refers to the color distinction.

== Importance/conservation status ==
Stonecats serve as indicators of water quality: they are not present in highly polluted or heavily silted areas. Stonecats are a valuable indicator species to humans, as they may also be useful as a marker for water temperature.

The US Endangered Species Act lists the status of N. flavus as not threatened or no special status, meaning that this species faces no risk of extinction.

== Bibliography ==
- Eddy, Samuel and Surber Thaddeus. Northern Fishes The University of Minnesota Press, Minneapolis, 1943 pp. 160–161, ASIN: B001OJ4F5W.
- Phillips, L. Gary, Schmid, D. William, and Underhill, C. James. Fishes of the Minnesota Region The University of Minnesota Press, Minneapolis, 1982 pp. 179–180, ISBN 978-0-8166-0982-6.
- Page, M. Lawrence and Burr, M. Brooks. Freshwater Fishes Houghton Mifflin Company, Boston, New York, 1999 pp. 199–200, Plate 26, ISBN 978-1-4214-1201-6.
- Froese, Rainer; Pauly, Daniel (eds.). "Noturus flavus". FishBase.
