= Stephen Alfred Forbes =

American naturalist

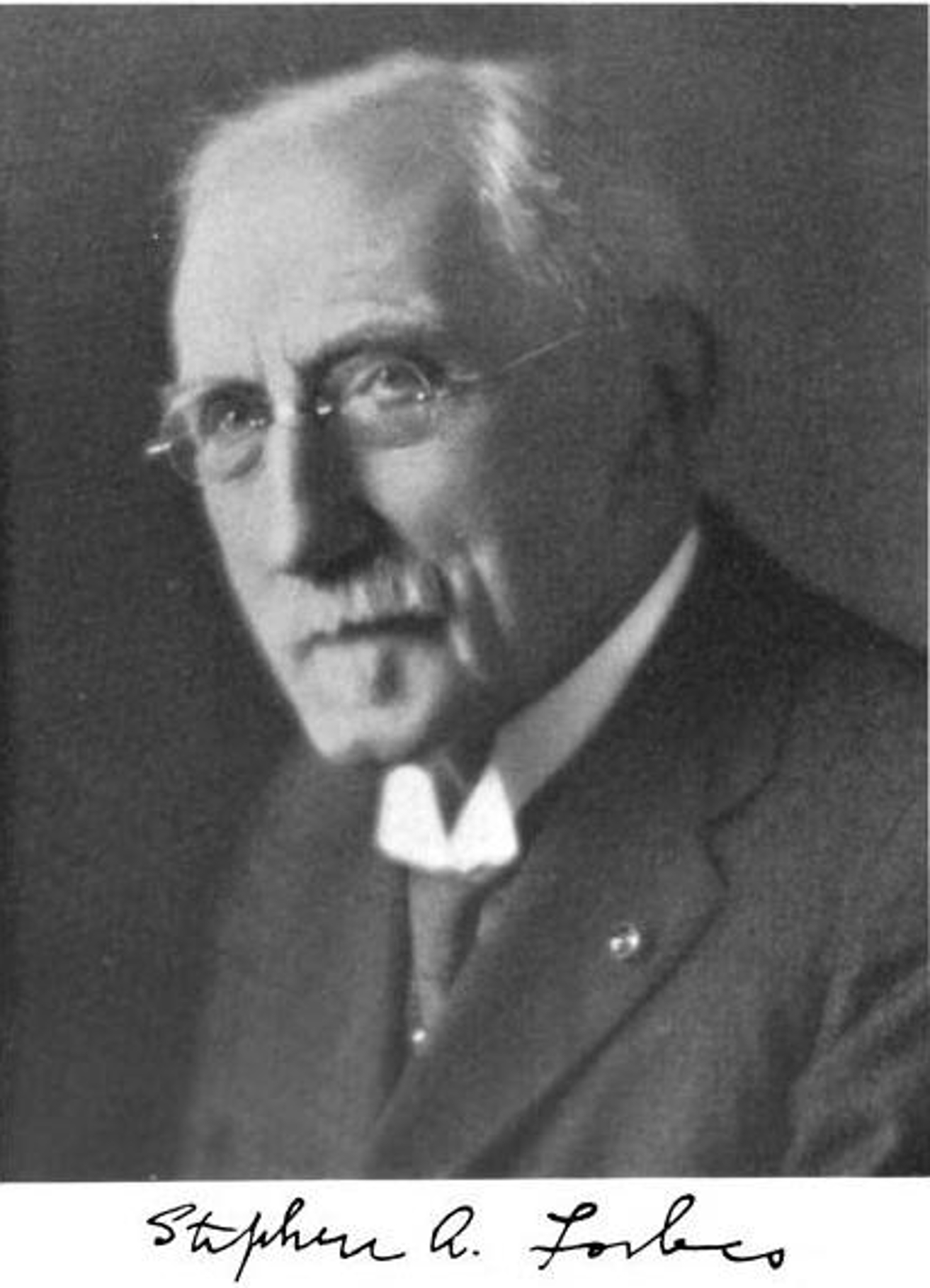
- Born: May 29, 1844; Silver Creek, Stephenson County, Illinois, United States
- Died: March 13, 1930 (aged 85); Urbana, Illinois
- Education: Illinois State Normal University; Rush Medical College
- Spouse: Clara Shaw Gaston
- Children: Bertha Van Hoesen; Ernest Browning; Winifred; Ethel; Richard Edwin
- Scientific career
- Fields: Entomology; Ecology
- Workplaces: University of Illinois; Illinois Natural History Survey

Stephen Alfred Forbes (May 29, 1844 – March 13, 1930) was the first chief of the Illinois Natural History Survey, a founder of aquatic ecosystem science and a dominant figure in the rise of American ecology. His publications are striking for their merger of extensive field observations with conceptual insights. Forbes believed that ecological knowledge was fundamental for human well being. Forbes was important to the development of ecological theory. He was acknowledged by the National Academy of Sciences as "the founder of the science of ecology in the United States".

While already famous as an economic entomologist, Forbes undertook studies of massive fish mortality in Lake Mendota, Wisconsin. He showed the connection of algae blooms and lake physics to fish kills, and embarked on a remarkable research program into lake ecology and river ecology. Many of his insights about lake ecology were collected in an influential paper, "The Lake as a Microcosm".

Notable for both conceptual creativity and the use of innovative quantitative methods, his work foreshadowed the ecosystem concept as well as modern ideas of behavioral ecology and food web dynamics. On top of this, Forbes introduced the concept of a "community of interest" that emphasized two major points: "the first that of a general community of interests among all the classes of organic beings here assembled, and the second that of the beneficent power of natural selection which compels such adjustments of the rated of destruction and of multiplication of the various species as shall best promote this common interest."

Forbes's studies of bird predation and the use of fungus to control the chinch bug were pioneering efforts in the study and application of insect diseases for the biological control of insect pests. They were important contributions to the establishment of integrated pest management in the twentieth century.

Forbes showed the importance of local knowledge in the early history of ecology in the United States.

== Biography ==
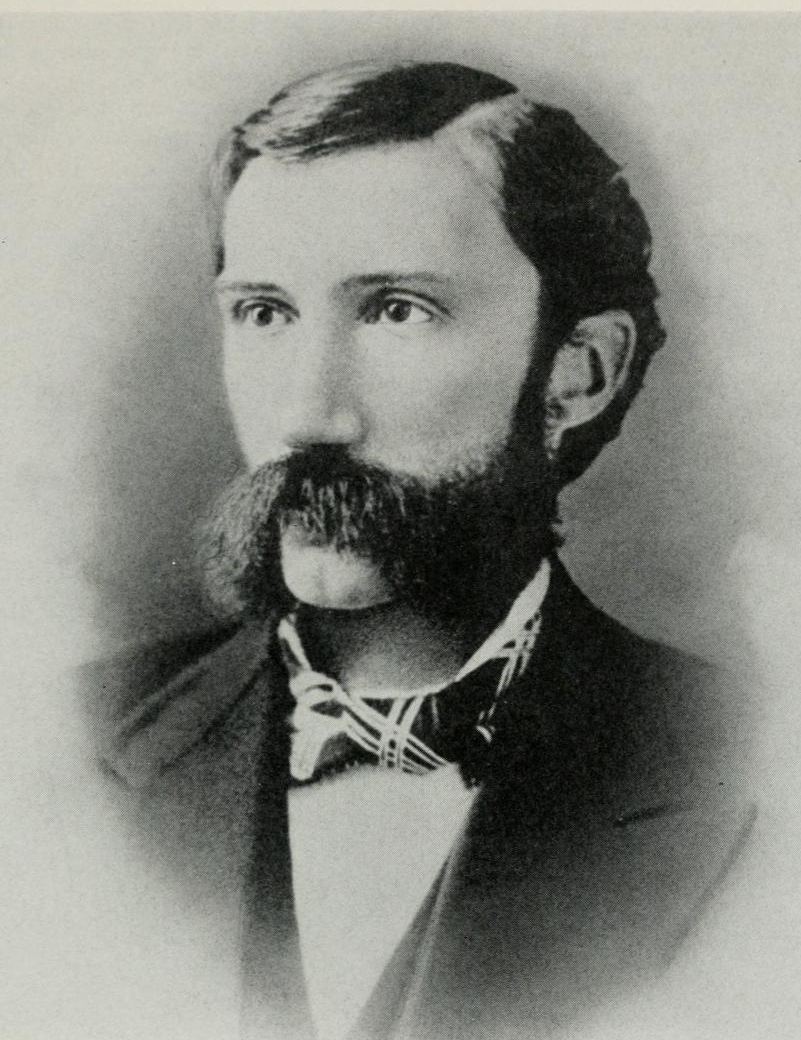
Forbes in the 1880s

Born into a pioneer family, of Scots and Dutch ancestry, he spent his youth near Freeport, Illinois, in Stephenson County. Beyond his common school education up to age 14, Forbes's only formal studies at the secondary level were three months during the winter term of 1859–1860 at Beloit Academy in Wisconsin, a year at Rush Medical College in Chicago after the Civil War, and the spring term of 1871 at Illinois State Normal University in Normal, Illinois.

Shortly after his fourteenth birthday in 1858, young Stephen witnessed one of the eight famous Lincoln–Douglas debates staged throughout Illinois for a seat in the U.S. Senate. Forbes, apparently emboldened by the contentious atmosphere of the occasion, embarrassed his family and fellow citizens by publicly scolding Douglas from the audience for what he perceived as a Douglas insult to Lincoln. At the age of 17 (in 1861) Forbes entered the Union Army with his brother and served with distinction until the end of hostilities in 1865. At the age of 18, he was captured by Confederate forces and was held in a prison camp for four months. After his release he was hospitalized for three months while recovering from scurvy and malaria. He then rejoined his regiment and was promoted to captain at age 20.

In 1867, Forbes invested in a strawberry farm in Carbondale, Illinois, which, according to his daughter Ethel, sparked Forbes's interest in the flora of southern Illinois.

Following his year of medical school at Rush College, Forbes farmed and taught school in southern Illinois. During this time he began his first studies in natural science in his leisure hours. His first published works appeared in American Entomologist and Botanist in 1870, and a new plant species, which he was the first researcher to describe, was named Saxifraga forbesii in his honor.

Forbes's work in natural history came to the attention of John Wesley Powell, then the curator of the museum of the Illinois Natural History Society in Normal. After Powell's departure from the state to pursue studies in the American West, the Illinois Natural History Society was disbanded and metamorphosed into the state-supported State Laboratory of Natural History.

Forbes was named director of the new State Laboratory of Natural History in 1877, and in 1882 he became both the director of the State Laboratory of Natural History and the state entomologist. Forbes moved from Normal to Urbana in 1885 to accept a position with the Illinois Industrial University (soon to be University of Illinois). He was also able to gain approval from the state legislature to transfer the State Laboratory of Natural History and its staff, library, and research collections to Urbana. In 1917, the State Laboratory of Natural History and the Office of the State Entomologist were combined by the General Assembly, as the Illinois Natural History Survey. Forbes became director (chief) and held this position until his death in 1930.

He was elected to the National Academy of Sciences in 1918. He was elected to the American Philosophical Society the following year. As president of the Ecological Society of America in 1921, he championed the practical uses of basic ecological science for the betterment of humankind. Forbes's extensive knowledge was not limited to entomology, but throughout his life he also studied and achieved distinction in ichthyology, ornithology, river and stream biology and pollution, and the taxonomy of Crustacea.

To Forbes the word "survey" meant more than a censusing of organisms or publishing lists showing their distribution. He felt that any study should define the relationships between living organisms and their environment—an ecological survey. This theory prevailed in his work and underlined the early research done at the Illinois Natural History Survey. In 1880 Forbes stated:

The first indispensable requisite is a thorough knowledge of the natural order—an intelligently conducted natural history survey. Without the general knowledge which such a survey would give us, all our measures must be empirical, temporary, uncertain, and often dangerous.

Today, the Illinois Natural History Survey is still housed on the campus of the University of Illinois, and is a division of the Prairie Research Institute.

From 1884 to 1886, while a student at the University of Illinois, entomologist Charles W. Woodworth was an assistant to Forbes.

== See also ==
- Stephen A. Forbes State Recreation Area
- Etheostoma forbesi
