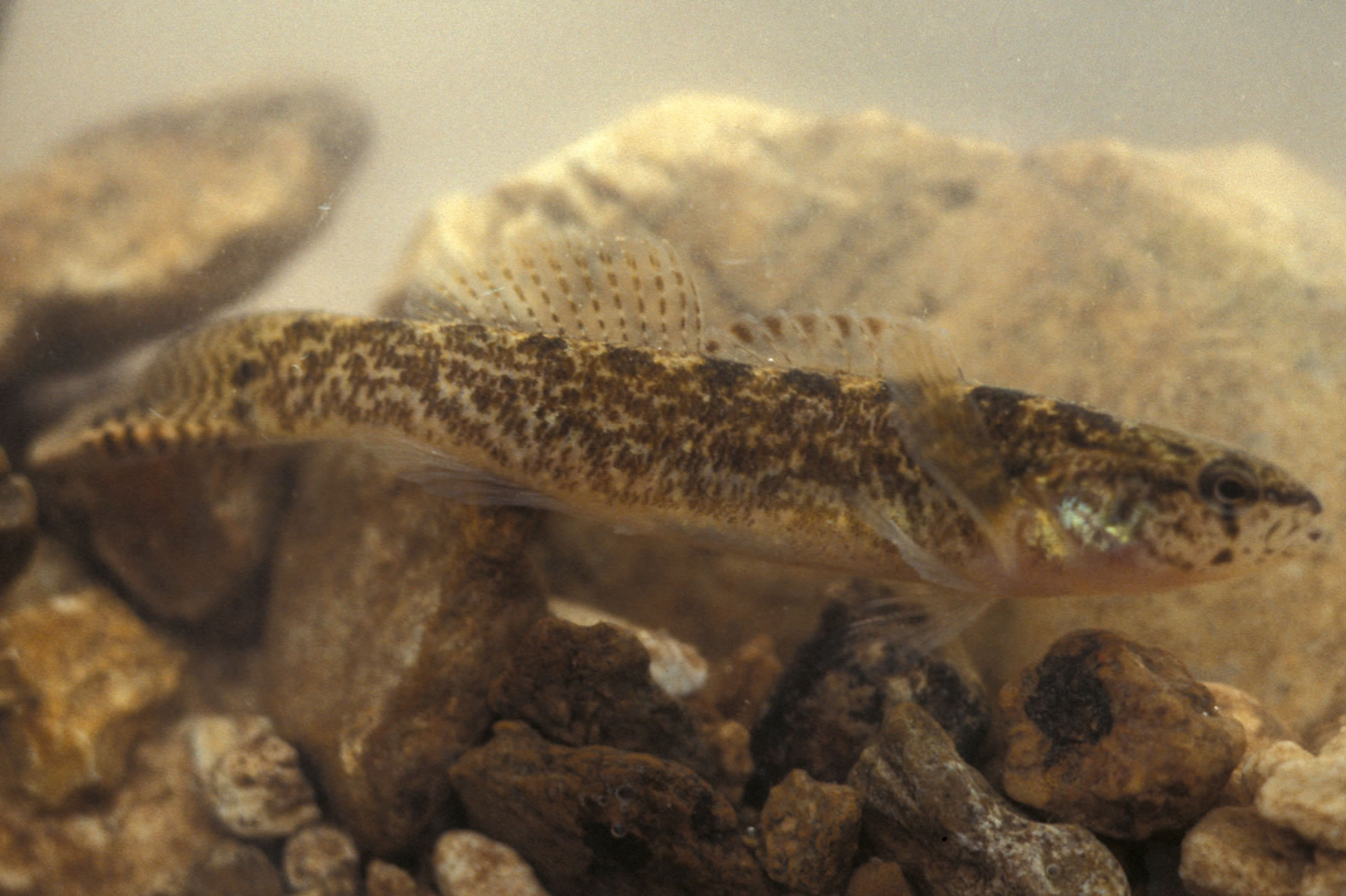

Conservation status
- Vulnerable (IUCN 3.1)

Scientific classification
- Kingdom: Animalia
- Phylum: Chordata
- Class: Actinopterygii
- Order: Perciformes
- Family: Percidae
- Genus: Etheostoma
- Species: E. forbesi

Binomial name
- Etheostoma forbesi Page & Ceas, 1992

= Barrens darter =

Species of fish

The Barrens darter (Etheostoma forbesi) is a species of freshwater ray-finned fish, a darter from the subfamily Etheostomatinae, part of the family Percidae, which also contains the perches, ruffes and pikeperches. It is endemic to the eastern United States, where it is only known from the Cumberland ecoregion. It inhabits generally quiet pools in headwaters and creeks, often sheltering underneath large rocks. This species can reach a standard length of 7.4 cm (2.9 in). This species forms part of the Etheostoma squamiceps species complex within the subgenus Catonotus and it is further part of the "blackfin darter" group. It was first formally described in 1992 by Lawrence M. Page and Patrick A. Ceas with its type locality given as Duke Creek which is 3.2 kilometres (2.0 miles) southeast of Hollow Springs in Cannon County, Tennessee.

== Etymology ==
The specific name honours Stephen A. Forbes, who was a noted ichthyologist member of the Illinois Natural History Survey during the early part of the 20th century.
