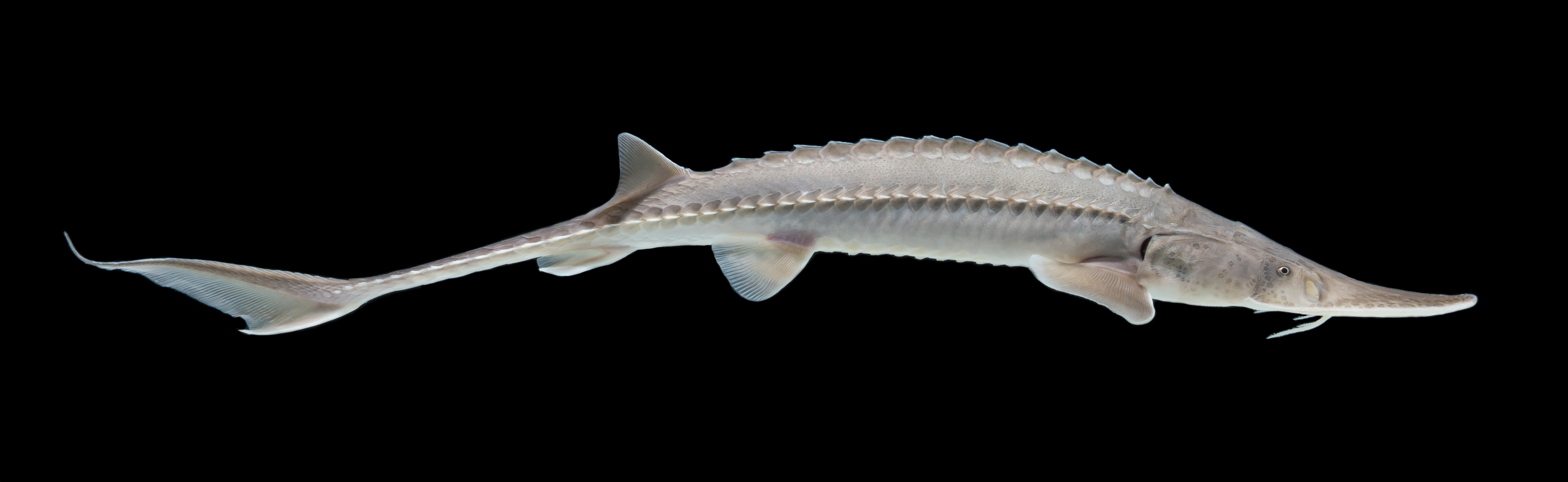

Conservation status
- Critically Endangered (IUCN 3.1)
- CITES Appendix II

Scientific classification
- Kingdom: Animalia
- Phylum: Chordata
- Class: Actinopterygii
- Order: Acipenseriformes
- Family: Acipenseridae
- Genus: Scaphirhynchus
- Species: S. albus

Binomial name
- Scaphirhynchus albus (S. A. Forbes & R. E. Richardson, 1905)
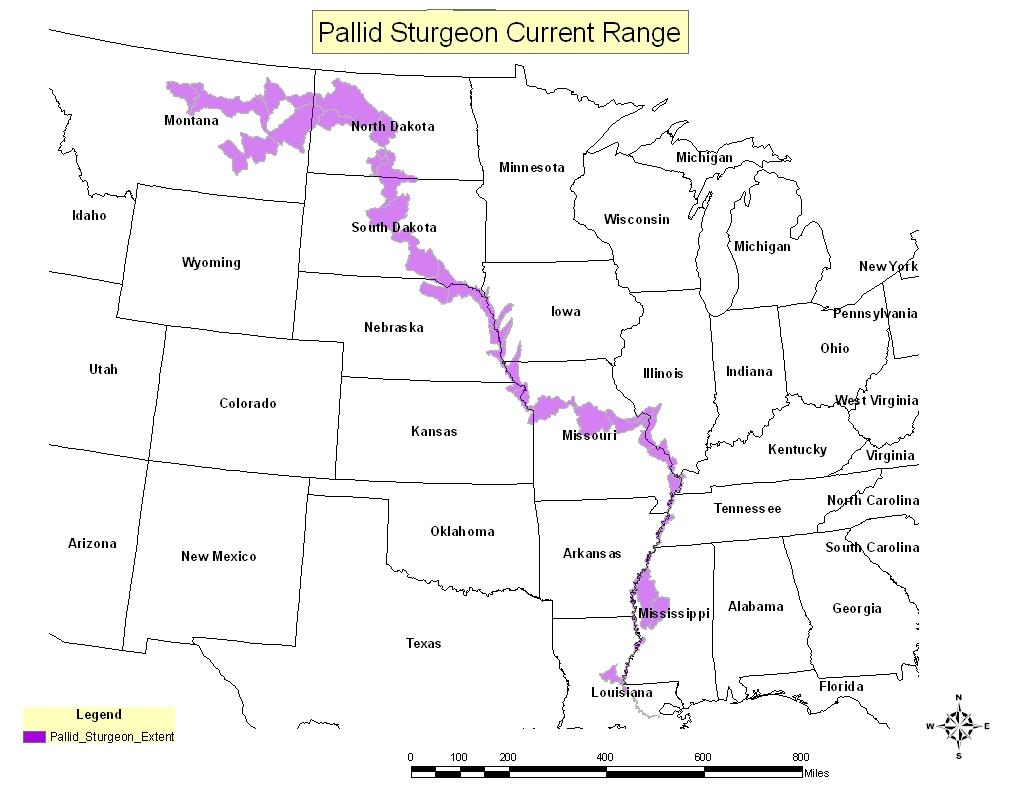
- Pallid sturgeon range

Synonyms
- Parascaphirhynchus albus S. A. Forbes and R. E. Richardson, 1905

= Pallid sturgeon =

Species of fish

The pallid sturgeon (Scaphirhynchus albus) is an endangered species of ray-finned fish, endemic to the waters of the Missouri and lower Mississippi River basins of the United States. It may have even reached the St. Croix River before colonization.

Named for its pale coloration, it is closely related to the more common shovelnose sturgeon (Scaphirhynchus platorynchus), but is much larger, averaging between 30 and 60 inches (76 and 152 cm) in length and 85 pounds (39 kg) in weight at maturity. This species takes 15 years to mature and spawns infrequently, but can live up to a century. A member of the sturgeon family, Acipenseridae, which originated during the Cretaceous period 70 million years ago, the pallid sturgeon has changed little since then.

In 1990, the U.S. Fish and Wildlife Service placed the pallid sturgeon on its endangered species list because few young individuals had been observed in the preceding decade and sightings had greatly diminished; the species is now rarely seen in the wild. It was the first fish species in the Missouri River drainage area to be listed as endangered, and a loss of its habitat is thought to be responsible for its decline. The vast majority of the Missouri River drainage system has been channeled and dammed, reducing the gravel deposits and slow-moving side channels that are its favored spawning areas. Until the middle of the 20th century, pallid sturgeon were common and anglers found catching such a large fish in fresh water a rewarding experience. The species is considered to be good-tasting, and its eggs have been used as caviar, although less commonly than those of many other sturgeon.

Efforts to prevent the species from becoming extinct have had modest success. Pallid sturgeon are actively being raised in a dozen hatcheries and the offspring are being released back to the wild every year. To better understand pallid sturgeon behavior, researchers have implanted radio transmitters to track their movements and help identify possible spawning areas. Federal and state agencies are working together to improve habitat by restoring spawning areas since restoration of these areas is required if the species is to survive in the wild.

== Taxonomy and etymology ==
Taxonomists S. A. Forbes and R. E. Richardson classified the pallid sturgeon in 1905, grouping it in the genus Parascaphirhynchus and the family Acipenseridae, which includes all sturgeon worldwide. Its closest relatives are the shovelnose sturgeon (Scaphirhynchus platorynchus), which is still relatively common, and the critically endangered Alabama sturgeon (Scaphirhynchus suttkusi), which may soon become extinct. These three species belong to the subfamily Scaphirhynchinae, which has only one other genus, Pseudoscaphirhynchus, represented by three species found in west-central Asia.

The word pallid means "deficient in color", and compared to other species of sturgeon, the pallid is noticeably paler. The scientific name for the fish is derived from Scaphirhynchus, a Greek word meaning "spade snout" and albus which is Latin for "white".

== Biology ==
=== DNA studies ===
To better protect the pallid sturgeon from extinction, research on its DNA and that of other closely related species was conducted to assess the differences within various populations of pallid sturgeon, and the differences between pallid and shovelnose sturgeon. Early DNA research indicated that pallid sturgeon and shovelnose sturgeon were a single species. However, a 2000 study comparing DNA sequences in the three members of the genus Scaphirhynchus (pallid, shovelnose, and Alabama sturgeon) showed that the three are distinct species. Between 2001 and 2006, several studies examined two populations of pallid sturgeon located in the upper Great Plains section of the Missouri River and compared them to a southern population located in the Atchafalaya River in Louisiana. These DNA studies concluded that the northern populations of pallid sturgeon are reproductively isolated and are genetically distinct from the Atchafalaya population. However, the genetic variability among pallid sturgeon was found to be far less than that between them and the shovelnose sturgeon.

Another reason for DNA testing was to determine the rates of hybridization between pallid and shovelnose sturgeon. The southern populations have more hybrids than are found in the middle sections of the Missouri River basin, while the northernmost populations have had few reports of hybrids. Hybrids are most common in the Atchafalaya River in Louisiana, and DNA sequencing in these hybrids showed a genetic distinction from pallid sturgeon, but based on the genetic markers assessed, they were genetically indistinguishable from shovelnose sturgeon. Because of this ability of two species to hybridize, some biologists have expressed concern that it is a violation of the Endangered Species Act to protect one species that may not be genetically isolated from another. It is not known if the hybrids are able to reproduce or not, although they appear to be the result of pallid sturgeon eggs being fertilized by shovelnose sturgeon males.

=== Physical characteristics ===
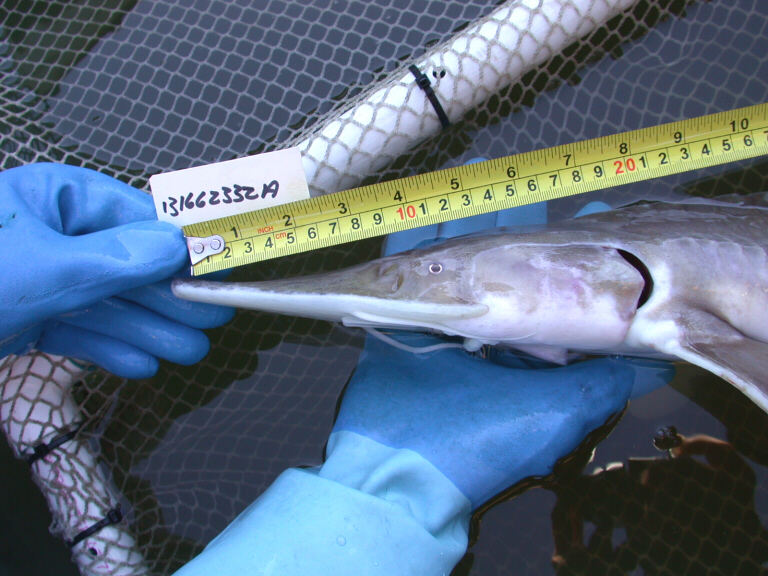
Detail and measurement of head of a hatchery-raised pallid sturgeon

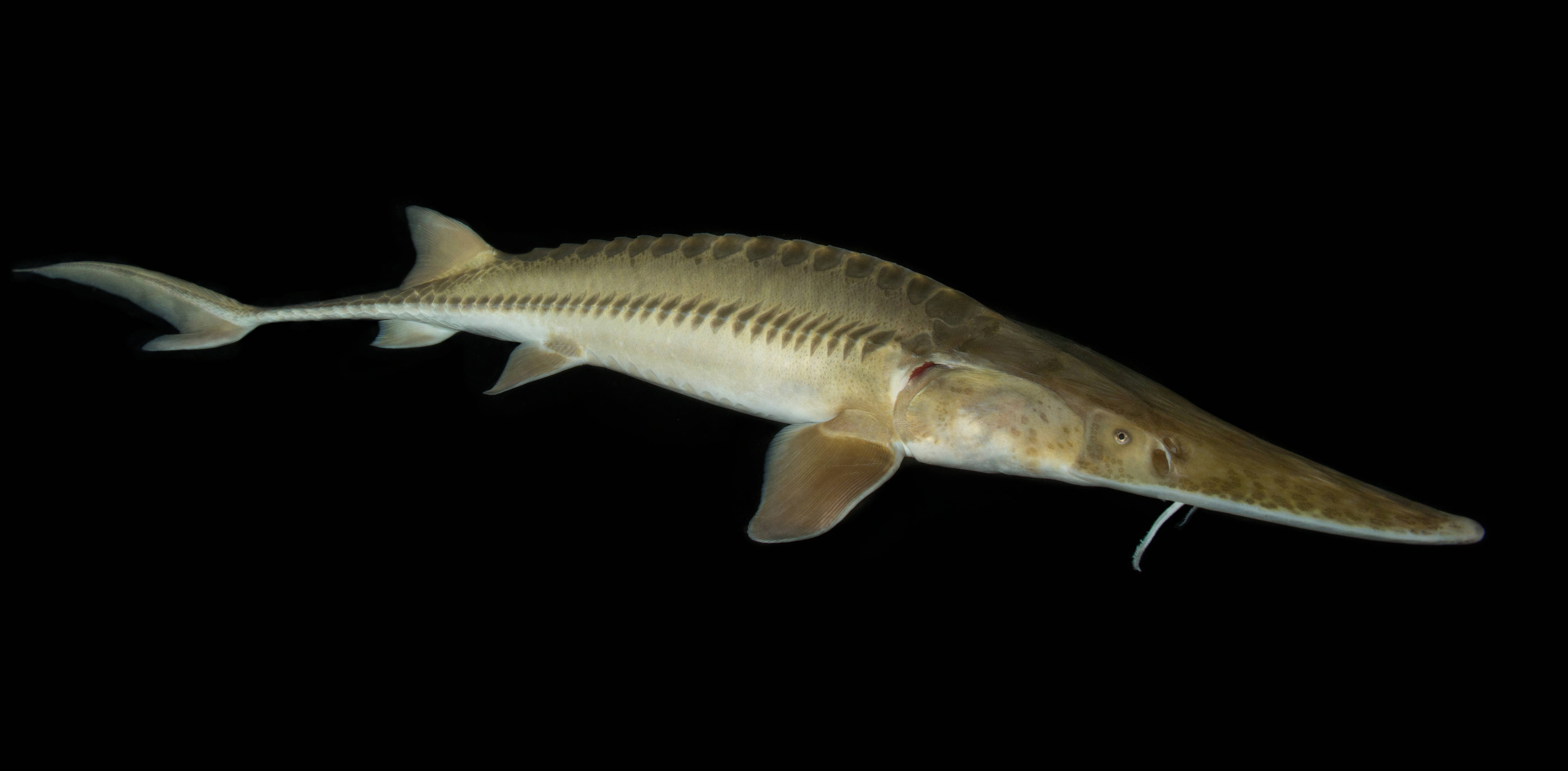
At Gavins Point NFH

The pallid sturgeon is one of the largest freshwater fish species in North America. They are generally between 30 and 60 inches (76 and 152 cm) in length and weigh as much as 85 pounds (39 kg). The species is ancient and has remained virtually unchanged for 70 million years, since the Cretaceous period. The pallid sturgeon has a distinctive appearance that has been referred to as "primitive", "dinosaur-like" and even "ugly". Although visually similar, the shovelnose sturgeon is much smaller and usually weighs no more than 5 pounds (2.3 kg). Pallid sturgeon are much paler in coloration with grayish white backs and sides, while shovelnose sturgeon are brown. Pallid sturgeon turn whiter as they age and younger specimens are easily confused with adult shovelnose sturgeon since they are similar in color. Like the shovelnose sturgeon, their tails are heterocercal, with the top tail fin being longer than the bottom fin, though this is more pronounced in pallid sturgeon.

As with other sturgeon, pallid sturgeon lack the scales or bones found in more "modern" species of fish. Instead, they have cartilaginous skeletons with five rows of thick cartilage plates that extend along their sides, undersides, and backs, as well as over most of the head. These thick cartilage plates are covered by the skin and serve as a protective armor. The bony cartilage also extends along the backside, from the dorsal fin to the tail.

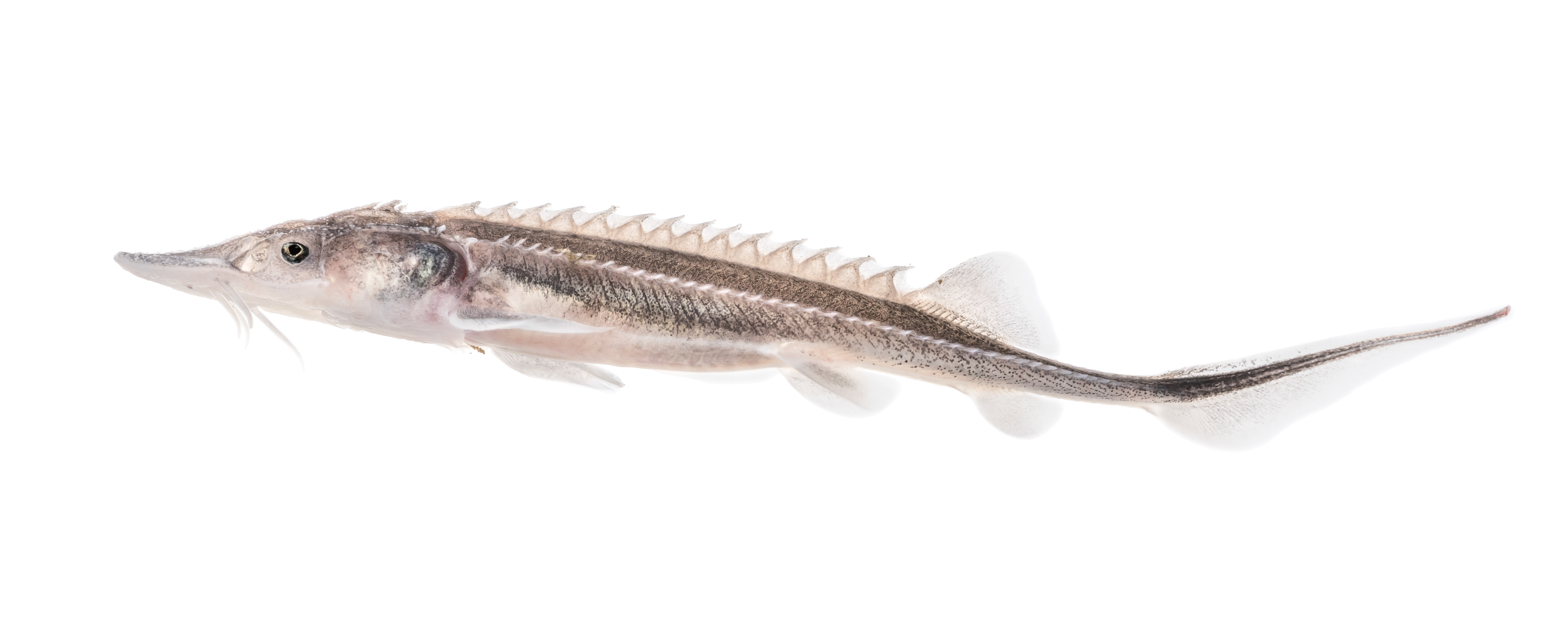
1 month old larva

The pallid sturgeon's snout and head are longer than those of the shovelnose sturgeon. In both species, the mouth is located well back from the tip of the snout. Lacking teeth, they use their extendable mouths to suck up small fish, mollusks, and other food sources from river bottoms. Both species also have four barbels which descend from the snout near the front of the mouth. The barbels are believed to be sensory features to locate food sources. On pallid sturgeon, the two inner barbels are about half as long as the outer ones, while on the shovelnose sturgeon, all four barbels are the same length. The inner barbels of the pallid sturgeon are positioned in front of the outer ones, but those on the shovelnose sturgeon are all located in essentially a straight line. The length and positioning of the barbels is one of the best ways to distinguish the two species.

=== Reproduction and lifecycle ===
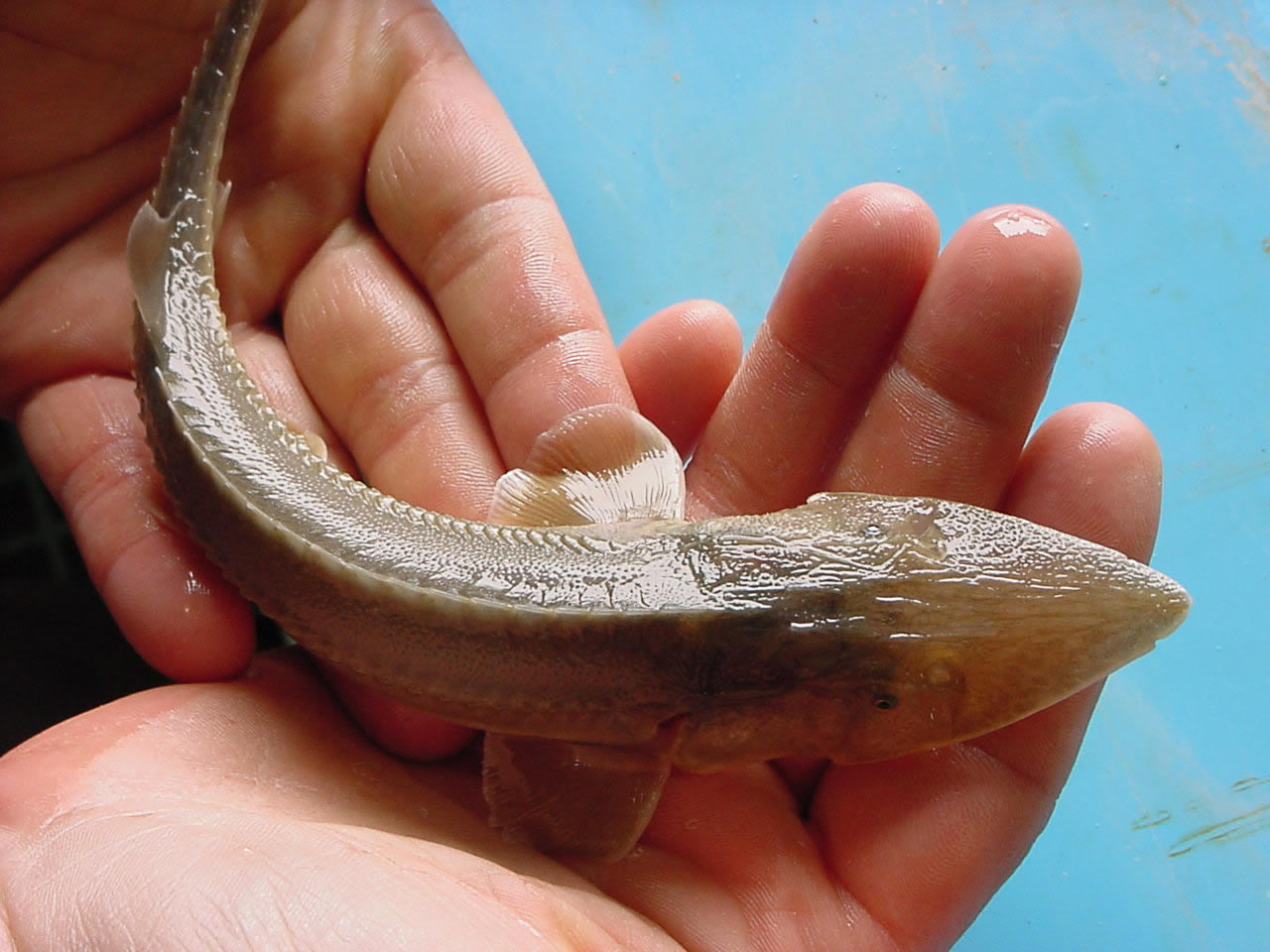
Juvenile raised at a fish hatchery

Pallid sturgeon have a long lifespan, living in excess of 50 and perhaps as long as 100 years. They lack bones and scales, which makes it more difficult to establish their age and determine exactly how long they live. As is true for many long-lived species, pallid sturgeon reach reproductive maturity relatively late. Males reach sexual maturity between the ages of 5 and 7 years, while females are believed to become capable of reproduction when they are at least 15 years old. One study of nine females indicated that they begin egg development between the ages of 9 and 12 years, but do not reach reproductive maturity until they are 15 years old. Reproduction does not take place every year; the average interval between spawnings is three years, although other studies suggest an interval as long as 10 years. Spawning usually takes place May to July.

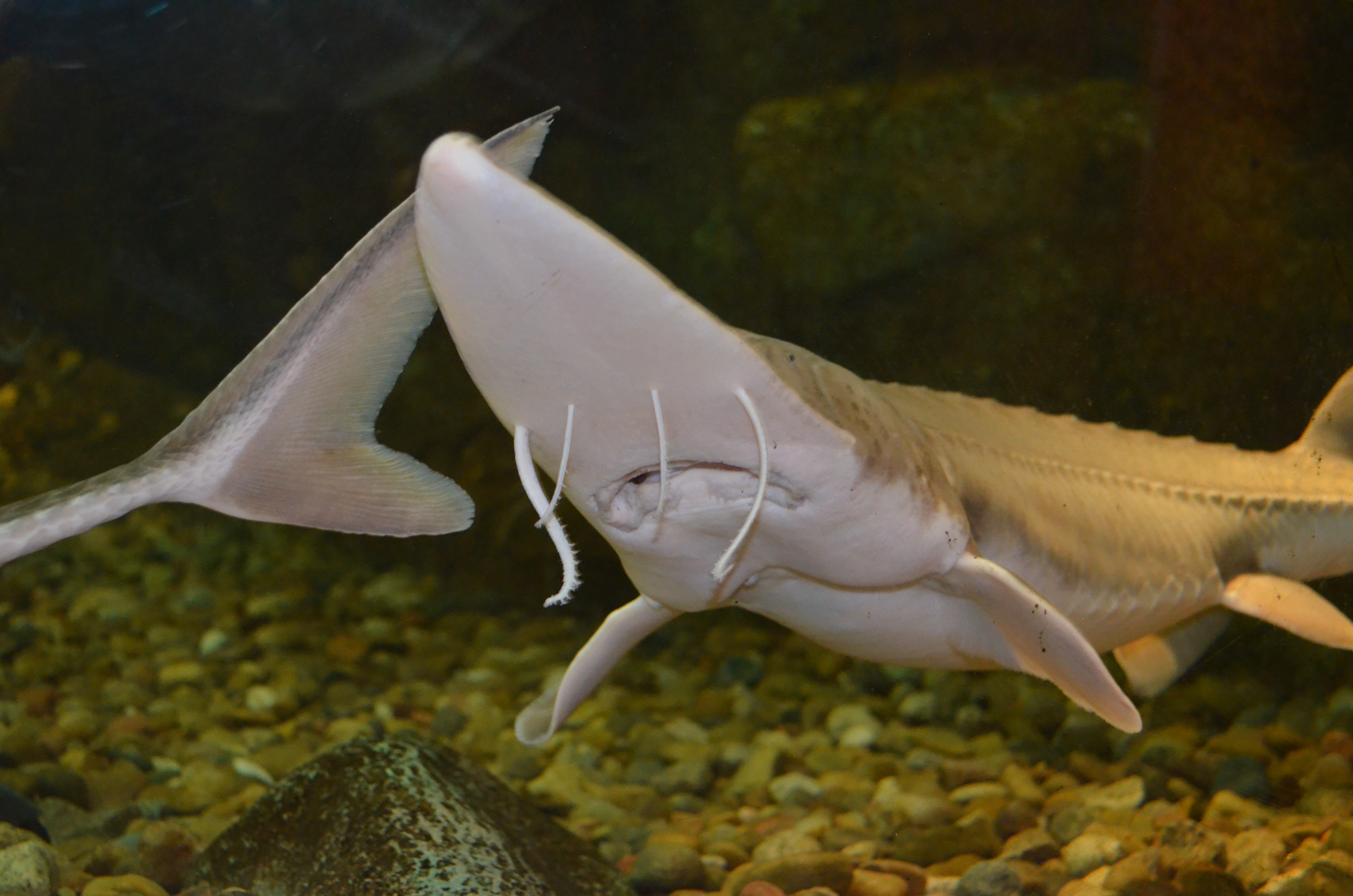
Head underside, sub-adult

Prior to the construction of dams on the Missouri, pallid sturgeon migrated hundreds of miles upstream to spawn, and sought out rocky or hard surfaces to deposit hundreds of thousands of eggs. One female pallid sturgeon caught in the upper Missouri River was estimated to be carrying 170,000 eggs, representing over 11 percent of its total body weight. After fertilization, pallid sturgeon eggs hatch in 5 to 8 days, after which the larvae drift back downstream for several weeks. As the larvae develop tails, they seek out slower-moving waterways and slowly mature over a period of a dozen years. The rate of survival to maturity for pallid sturgeon larvae is extremely low, and of the hundreds of thousands of eggs spawned, only a few live to adulthood.

For several decades, no natural reproduction of pallid sturgeon was observed, since all the fish that had been captured were older specimens. In the late 1990s, young pallid sturgeon were discovered living in a restored riparian area of the lower Missouri River. This was the first documented example of wild spawned pallid sturgeon in 50 years. In 2007, two female pallid sturgeon were also reported to have spawned in the Missouri National Recreational River area located downstream from Gavins Point Dam on the Missouri River.

Growth series (from youngest to oldest)

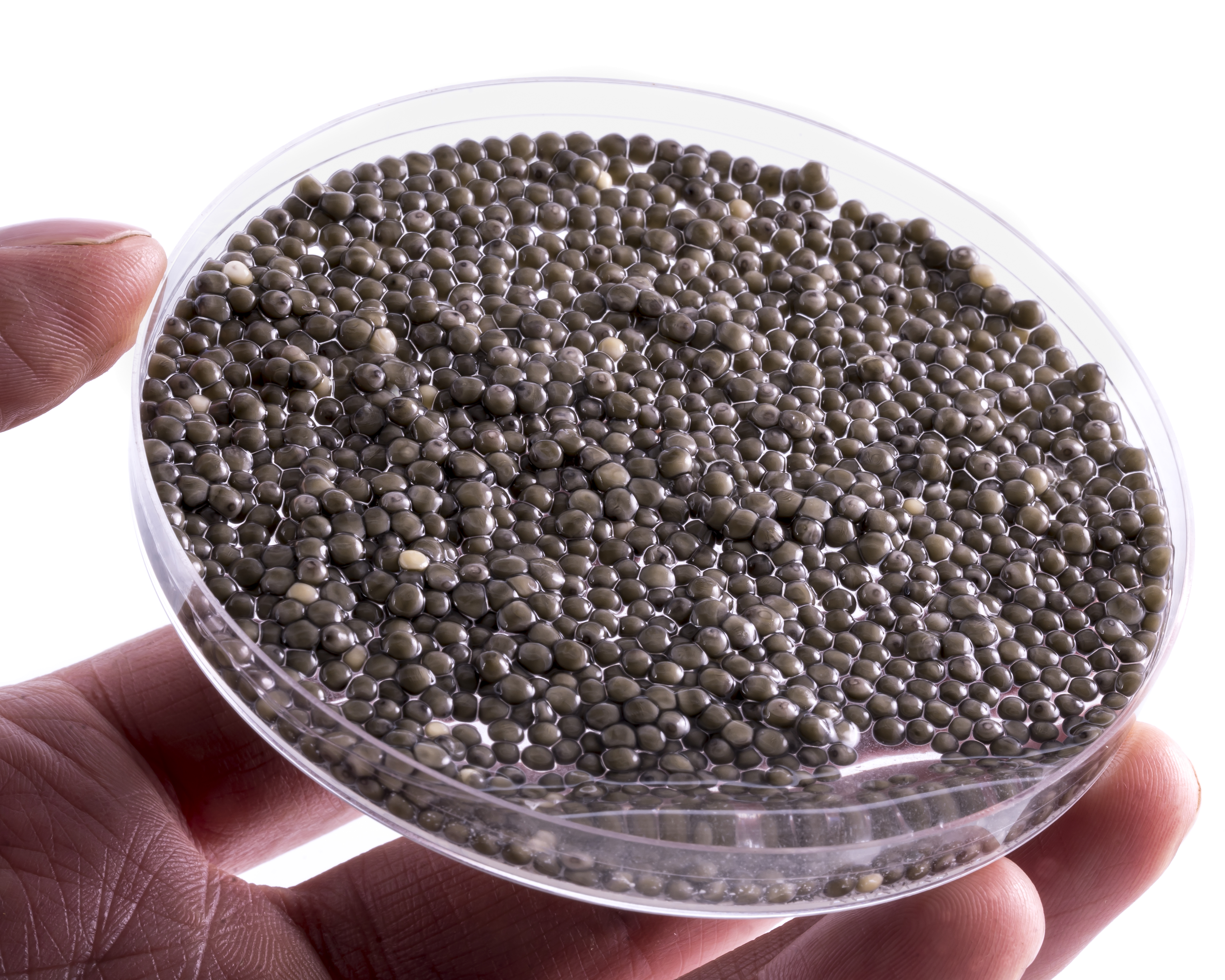
Eggs

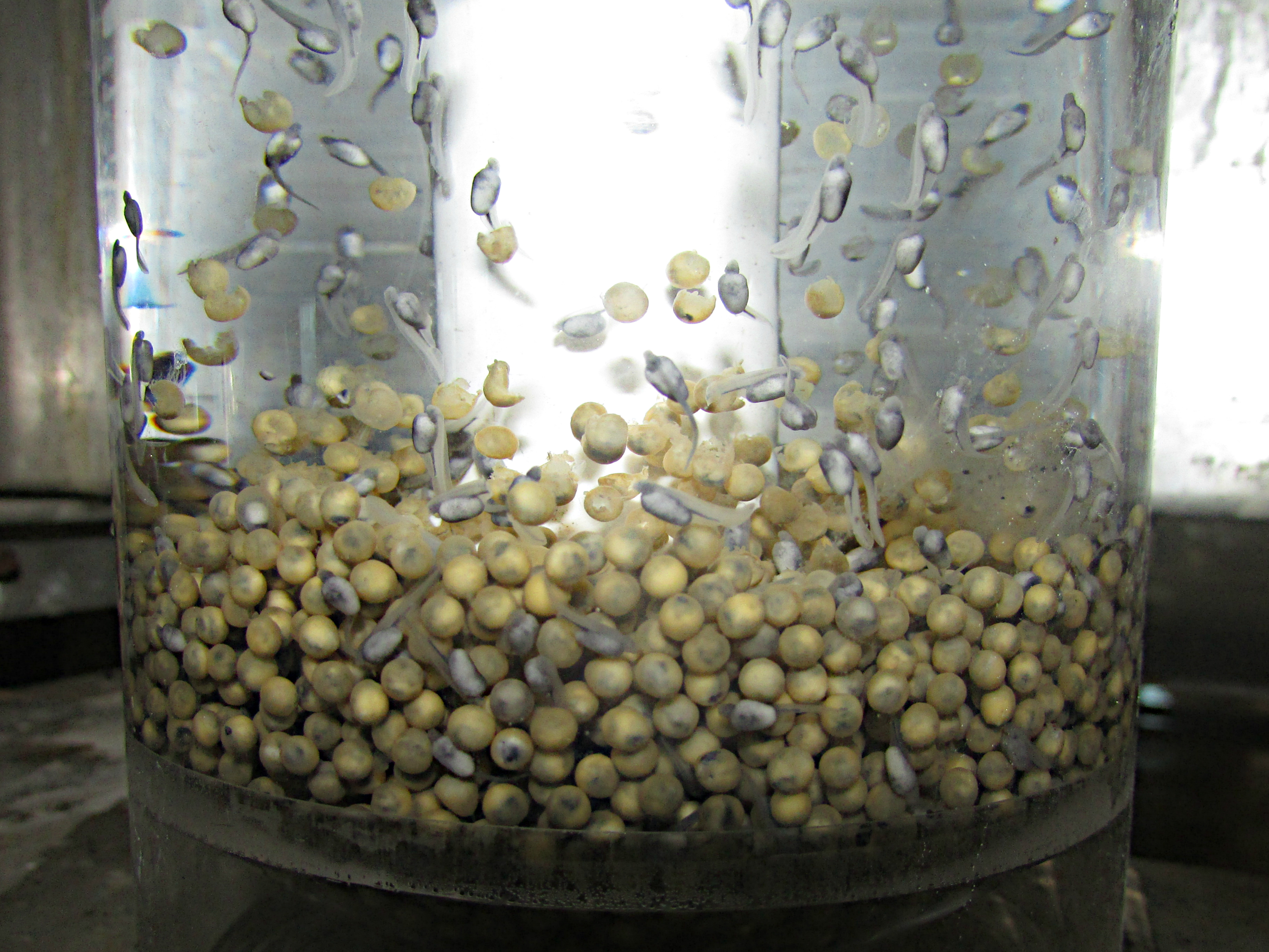
1 day old hatchlings

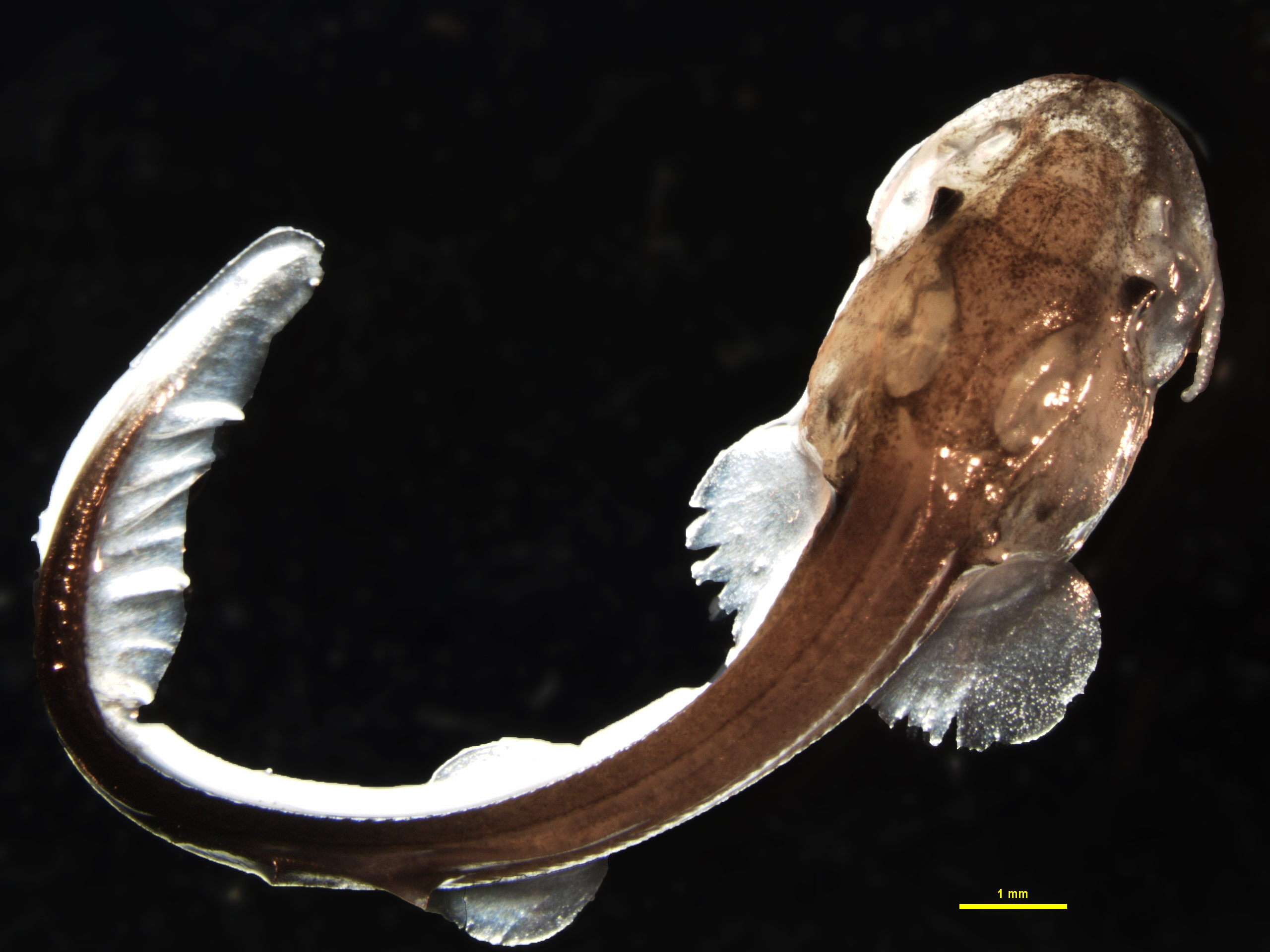
10 day old

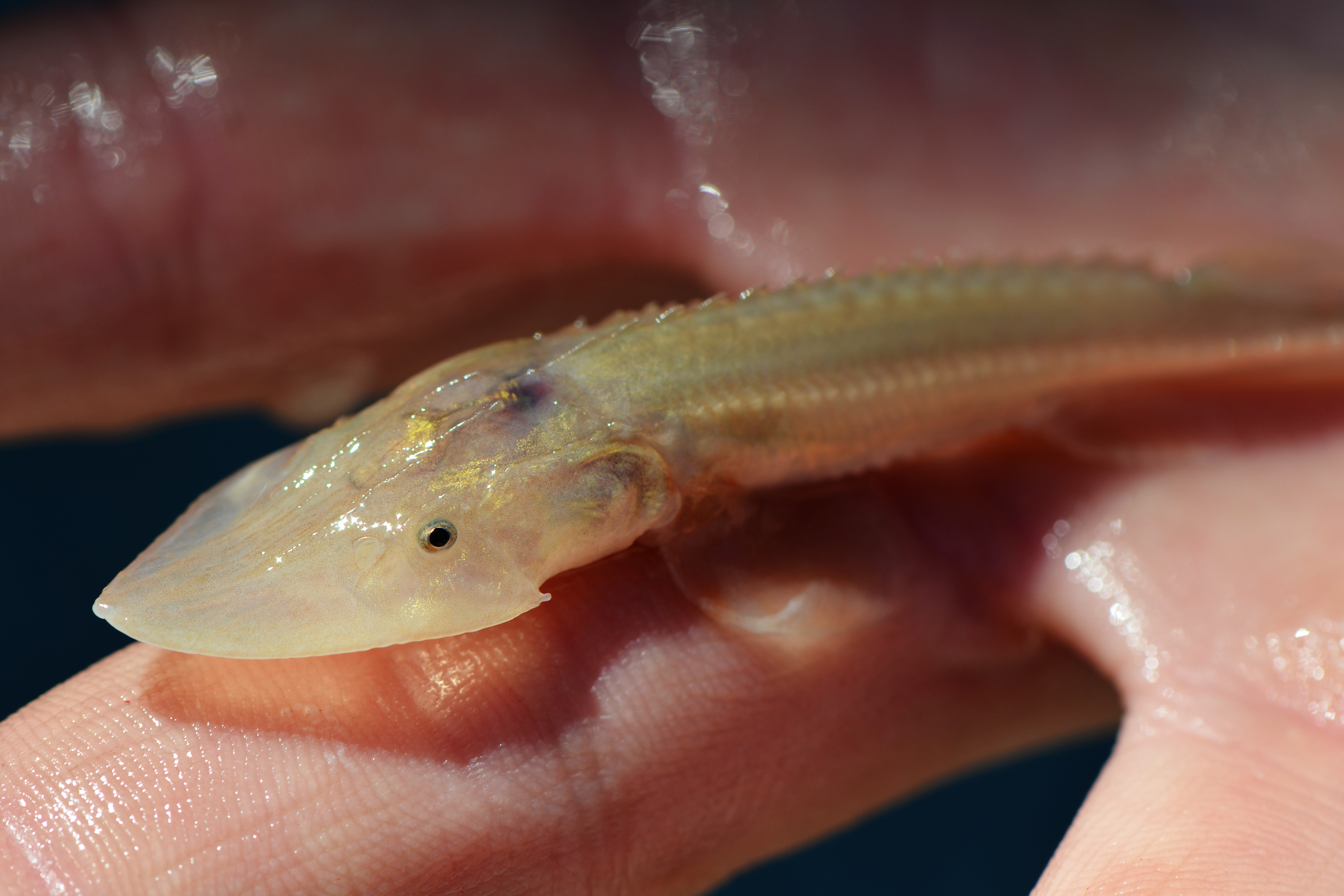

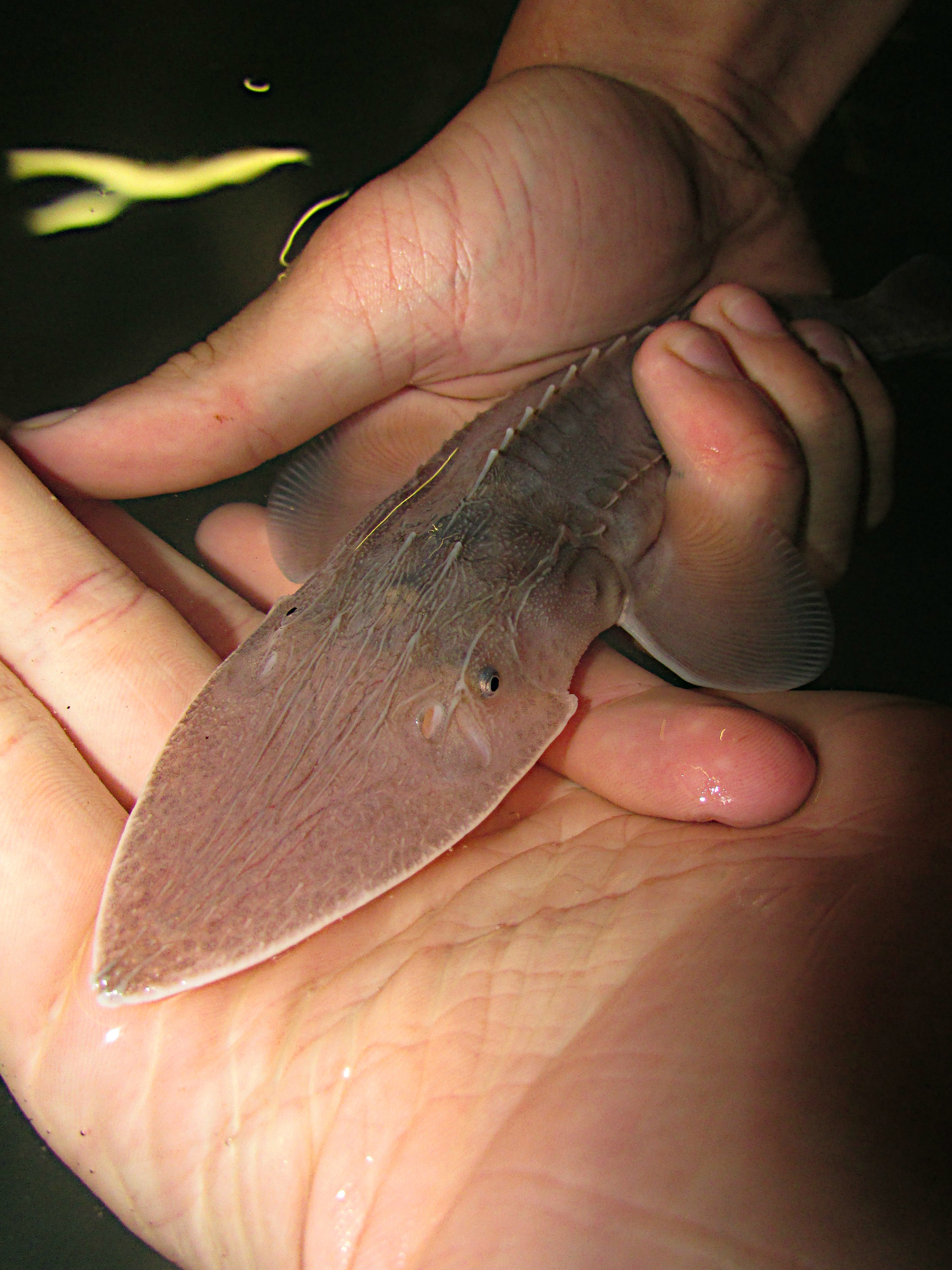
1 year old

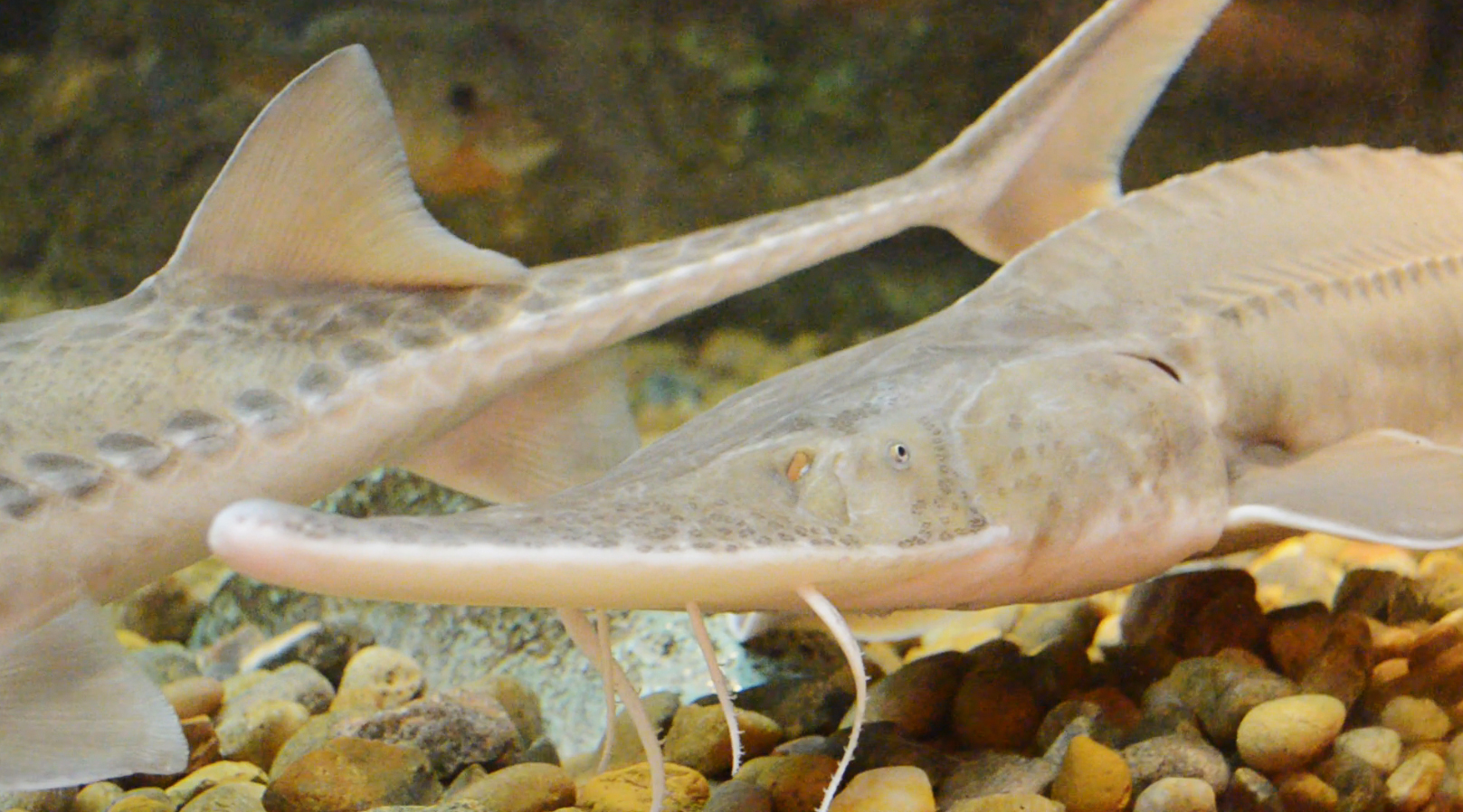
Sub-adult

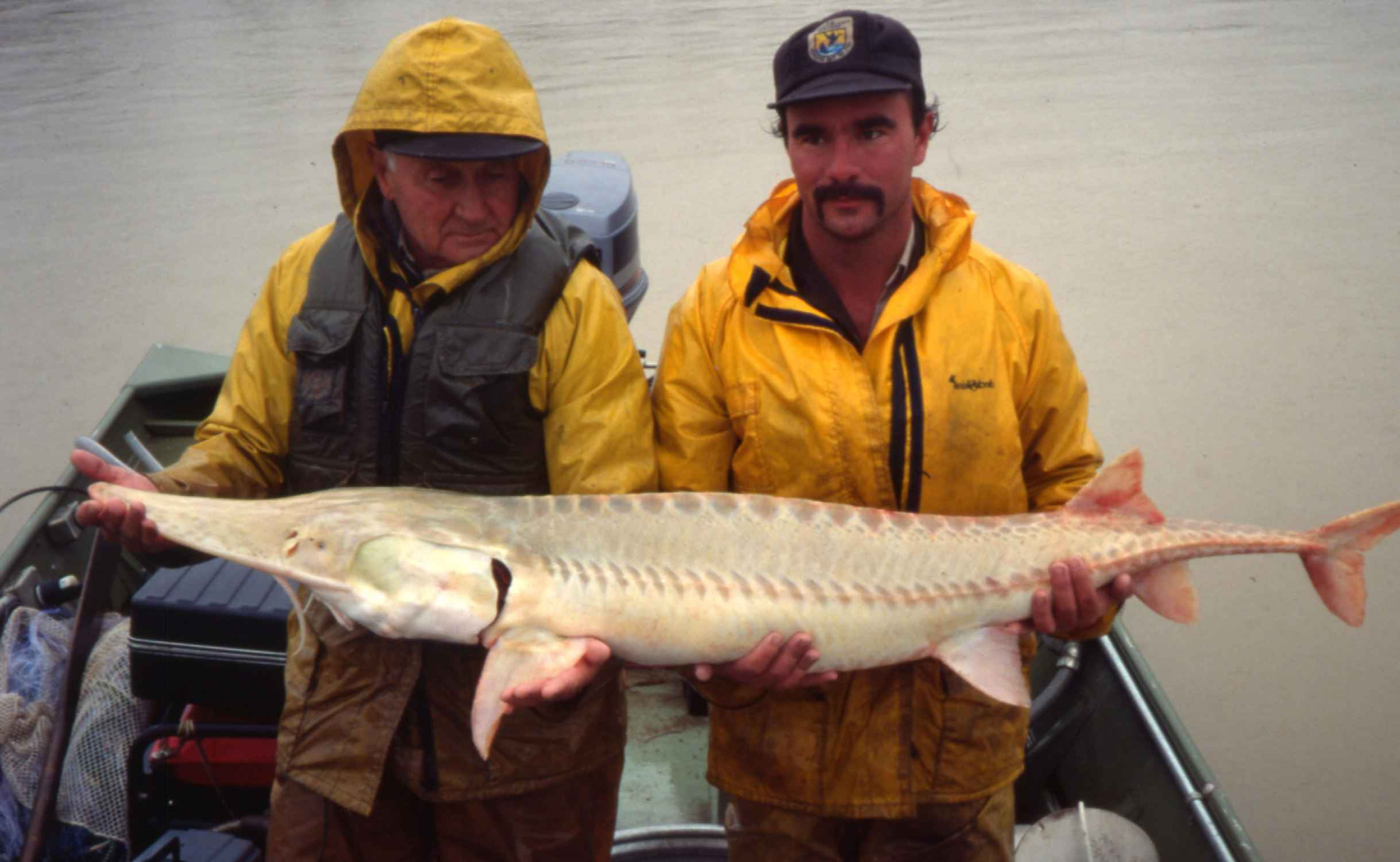
Adult

== Ecology ==
=== Distribution ===
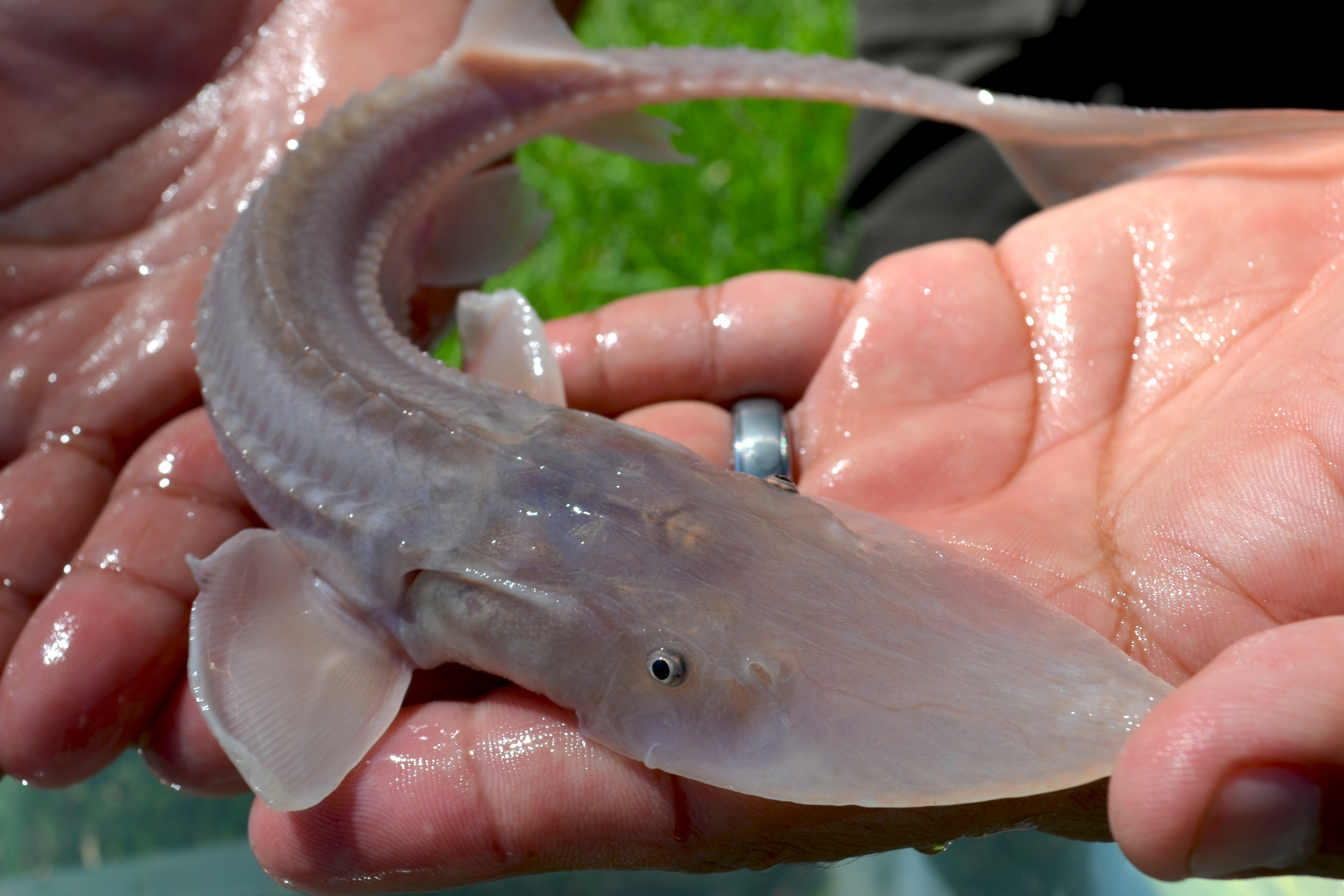
Juvenile at Neosho National Fish Hatchery

The pallid sturgeon's historical range spanned the entire Missouri River and into the Mississippi River. Historically, the species was rare to nonexistent in the upper Mississippi, probably due to a lack of proper habitat. Currently, the species is considered imperiled throughout its entire range. As of 2008, pallid sturgeon can still be found throughout their original range, but their population numbers have severely declined from the mid-20th century. The Missouri and Mississippi rivers from Montana to Louisiana, as well as the Atchafalaya River in Louisiana, continue to harbor an aging population of pallid sturgeon. Pallid sturgeon have never been very common; as early as 1905 when the species was first identified, they represented only one in five of all sturgeon in the lower Missouri River and as few as one in 500 where the Illinois River meets the Mississippi. Between 1985 and 2000, the ratio of pallid sturgeon to all sturgeon netted declined from one in about 400 to one in nearly 650. A 1996 study concluded that between 6,000 and 21,000 pallid sturgeon remained in their natural habitat at that time.

Showing siphoning feeding behaviour

Six areas were studied for wild pallid sturgeon population estimates and recovery recommendations by the United States Fish and Wildlife Service (USFWS) between 1990, when the species was declared endangered, and 2006. The USFWS has referred to these six areas of wild population studies as "recovery priority management areas" (RPMAs). In the northernmost region of the study, known as RPMA 1, located between the Marias River in Montana and the western reaches of Fort Peck Reservoir, only 45 wild (nonhatchery) individuals remain. Of these, no juveniles were observed and the population was declining. In RPMA 2, located between Fort Peck Dam, the headwaters of Lake Sakakawea, and the lower Yellowstone River up to the confluence of the Tongue River, Montana, only 136 wild specimens remain. In RPMA 3, stretching from upstream of the Niobrara River to Lewis and Clark Lake along the Missouri River, no native populations were recorded. All collected specimens appeared to be hatchery-raised. However, these specimens were apparently maturing and adjusting well to this section of the river. Recovery priority management area 4 extends from Gavins Point Dam to the confluence of the Missouri and Mississippi rivers. This region also includes the Platte River. Here, at least 100 unique nonhatchery specimens were collected during the study period. Evidence also indicates some wild reproduction is going on in this region. In RPMA 5, between the confluence of the Missouri and Mississippi and the Gulf of Mexico, several hundred specimens were documented. Again, some evidence suggests natural reproduction is occurring, as demonstrated by the recovery of a few examples of immature, nonhatchery-raised individuals. The Atchafalaya River basin is designated as RPMA 6 and the findings there were similar to those in RPMAs 4 and 5, but with greater numbers of unique individuals, near 500 in total.

=== Habitat ===
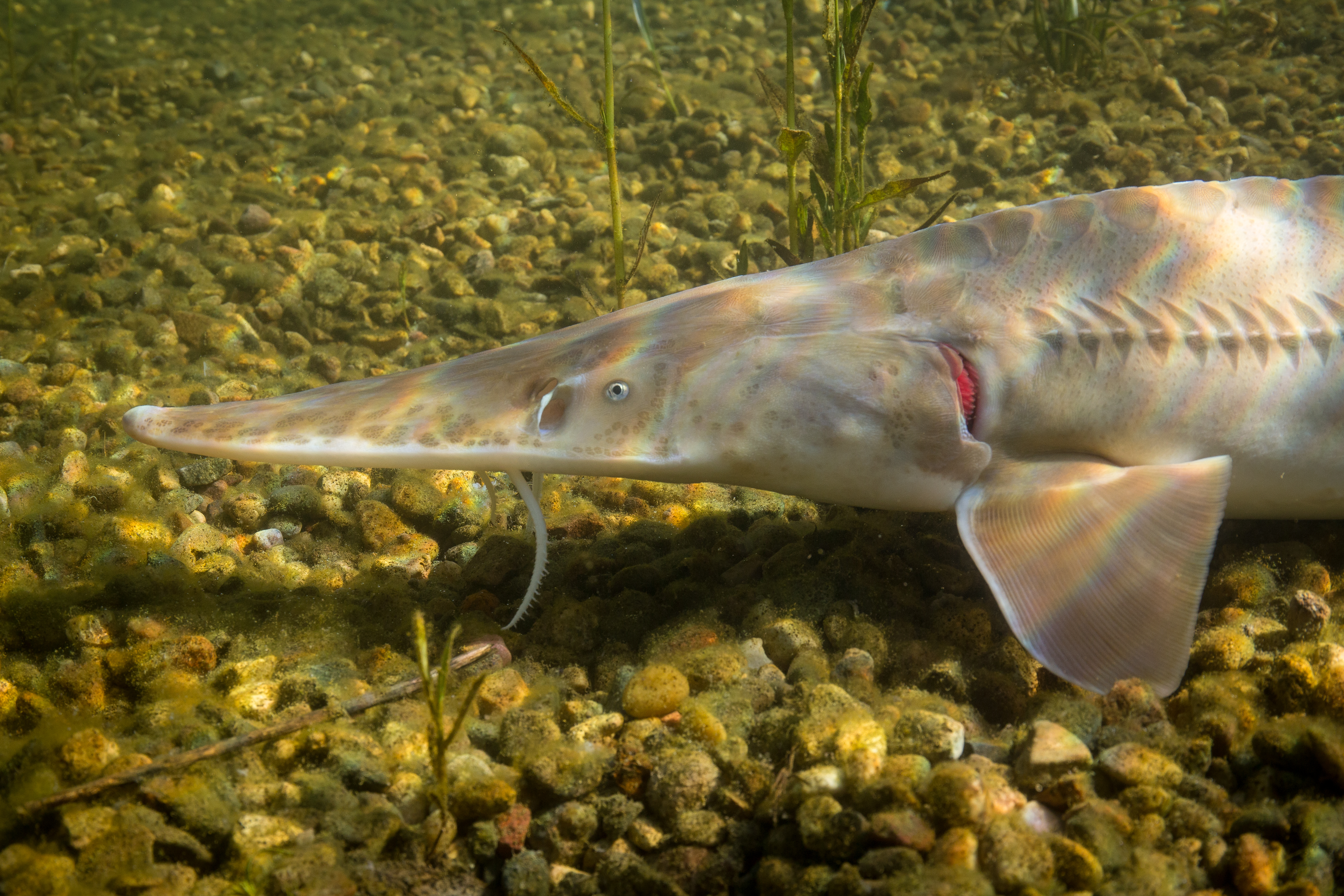
At Gavins Point NFS

Pallid sturgeon prefer moderate to swift river currents and most captured specimens have been recovered in rivers and streams in which the current averages between 0.33 and 2.9 feet per second (0.10 and 0.88 m/s). They also prefer turbid waterways and water depths between 3 and 25 feet (0.91 and 7.62 m). The species is more commonly found where sandy substrates are plentiful, but also lives in predominately rocky waterways. Pallid sturgeon prefer swift river currents more often than do shovelnose sturgeon.

In a study in Montana and North Dakota conducted on both the pallid and shovelnose sturgeon, both species were fitted with radio transmitters so researchers could track their swimming habits. Pallid sturgeon were found to prefer wider river channels, midchannel sandbars, and numerous islands, and were most commonly recorded in water depths between 2 and 47 feet (0.61 and 14.33 m). The study also showed that the pallid sturgeon moved as much as 13 miles (21 km) per day and up to 5.7 miles per hour (9.2 km/h). Pallid sturgeon are believed to have preferred the muddy and generally warmer waters that existed prior to Missouri River dam construction.

=== Food preferences ===
Pallid sturgeon are generally bottom feeders, skimming the sandy reaches of the various rivers and streams in their habitat. Though little is known about the precise eating habits of the species, they are thought to be opportunistic feeders. One study which examined the contents from the stomachs of juvenile pallid sturgeon revealed that their diets were seasonally dependent. Various insects were consumed during some seasons and various fish species during others. These results support the description of the pallid sturgeon's eating habits as opportunistic. Fish is a more important dietary staple for pallid sturgeon than it is for shovelnose sturgeon. In one study comparing dietary tendencies between adult shovelnose sturgeon and immature pallid sturgeon, the pallid sturgeon was found to consume far greater numbers of small fish such as cyprinids (minnows). In another study conducted in the upper Missouri River region, an examination of the stomach contents of hatchery-reared pallid sturgeon showed that 82% of the wet weight was small fish and the balance was mosquito-like insects, mayflies, and caddis flies and small amounts of detritus and plant material.

== Conservation ==
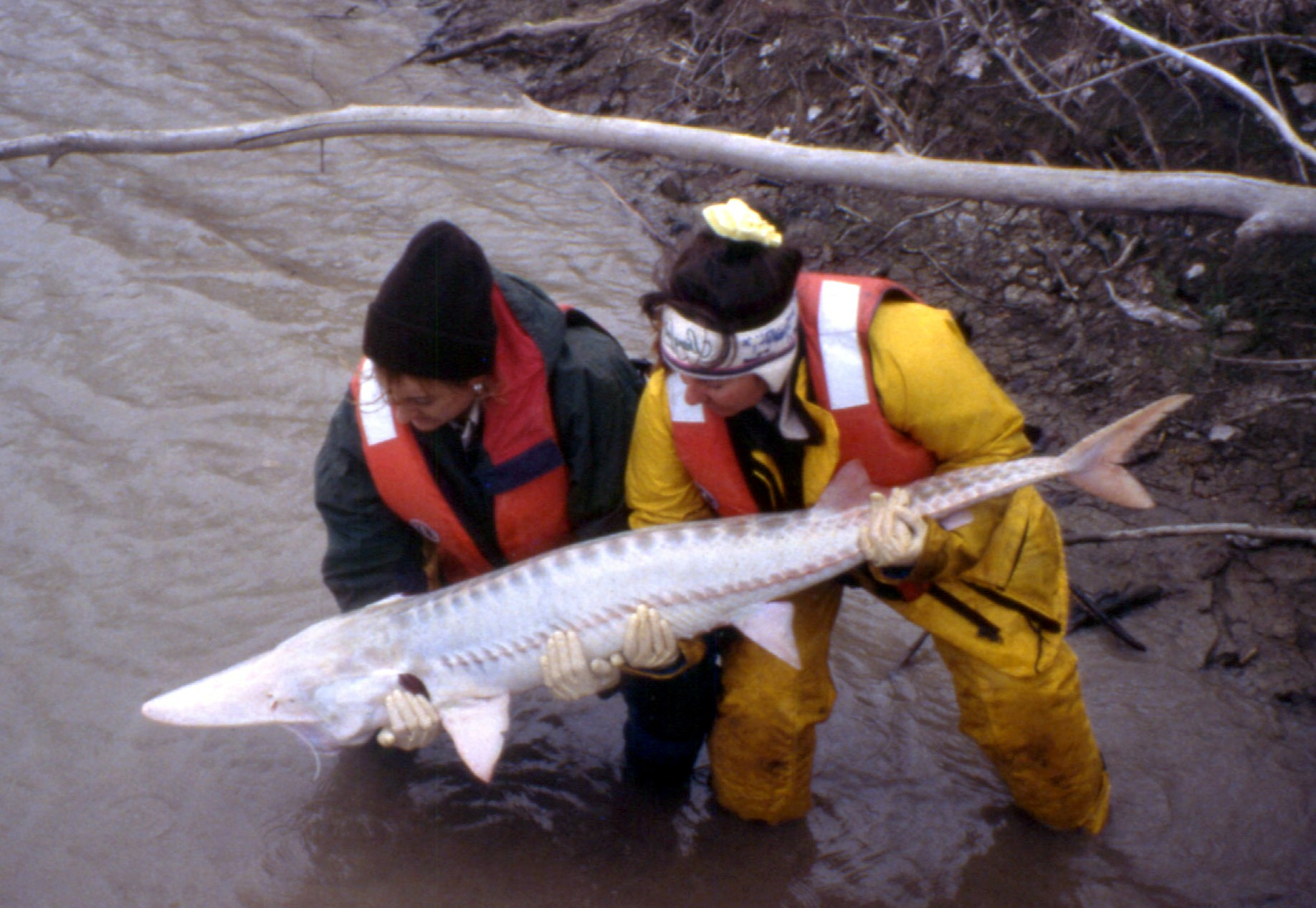
USFWS employees release a pallid sturgeon into the Yellowstone River

Though never believed to be common, pallid sturgeon populations rapidly declined during the late 20th century and the species was listed as endangered on September 6, 1990. The U.S. government and most of the states with pallid sturgeon populations have commenced restoration efforts to save the species from extinction. Wild reproduction of pallid sturgeon is rare to nonexistent in most areas; therefore, human intervention is needed to ensure the survival of the species. Pallid sturgeon were previously considered a prized trophy game fish species, until their numbers declined and they were placed on the endangered species list. All captured pallid sturgeon must now be released back to the wild. The species was known for being very palatable and the roe from females was used as caviar.

The route and the environmental characteristics of Missouri River in the northern Great Plains states of North and South Dakota, Nebraska, and Montana have been significantly altered. The resultant changes to the Missouri River in the upper Great Plains from channelization and impoundment prevent upstream migration. The reduced water flow rates and sediment loads have brought an end to the seasonal flooding of the flood plains in the region. Since the construction of the Fort Peck Dam in Montana in 1937, and subsequent damming and channelization, the Missouri River has lost over 90% of its wetland and sandbar ecosystems. More than 2,000 mi (3,200 km) of the Missouri River have been altered and only that stretch of the river above Fort Peck Reservoir in Montana remains relatively unchanged. These alterations of the river have had a detrimental impact on a number of native fish species. In the 13 U.S. states where the pallid sturgeon is found, only a few other fish species are listed as critically endangered.

=== Species preservation efforts ===
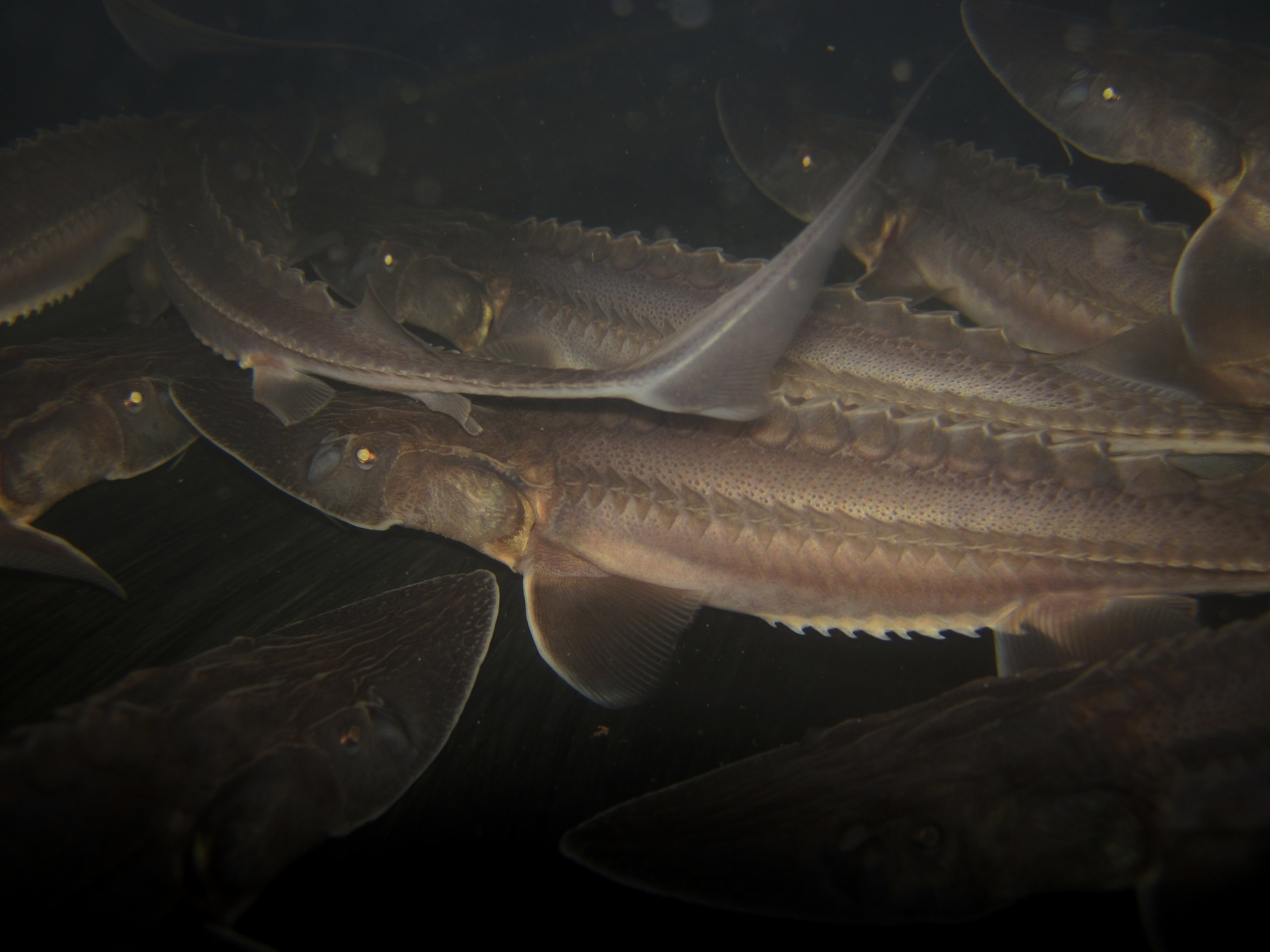
Hatchery juveniles at Garrison Dam.

Two populations of pallid sturgeon in the Missouri and Yellowstone rivers of Montana are both at risk of extinction, and current projections are that wild pallid sturgeon populations in Montana will be extinct by 2018. Though a vigorous stocking effort was implemented in 1996, until pallid sturgeon females reach reproductive maturity sometime after they are 15 years of age, recovery efforts in Montana will not be readily measurable. The U.S. Bureau of Reclamation has been conducting spring pulse water releases from the Tiber Dam every four to five years to try to recreate a semblance of an annual spring flood to restore and rejuvenate downstream floodplains. These pulse releases are done in an effort to restore suitable habitat for numerous fish species.

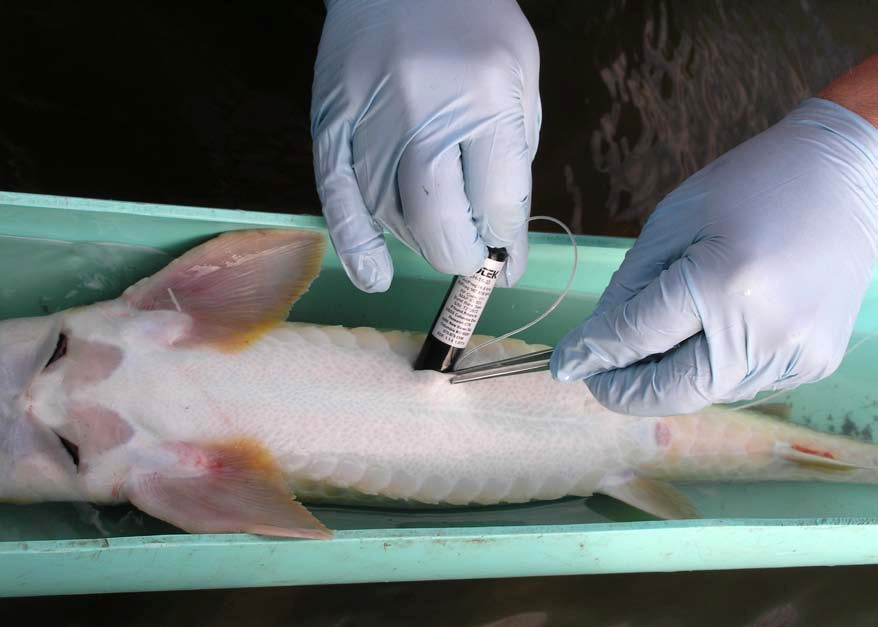
Surgical implant of a radio transmitter in a sexually mature pallid sturgeon

In Nebraska, a small number of pallid sturgeon have been captured along the lower reaches of the Platte River. Unlike most rivers in the Mississippi-Missouri River System, the Platte River has only a few dams and they are well upstream from its confluence with the Missouri River. The lower Platte River is shallow with numerous sand bars and small islands. Though pallid sturgeon prefer more turbulent and deeper rivers than the Platte, between 1979 and 2003, over a dozen pallid sturgeon, including some from hatcheries, have been captured from the Platte River.

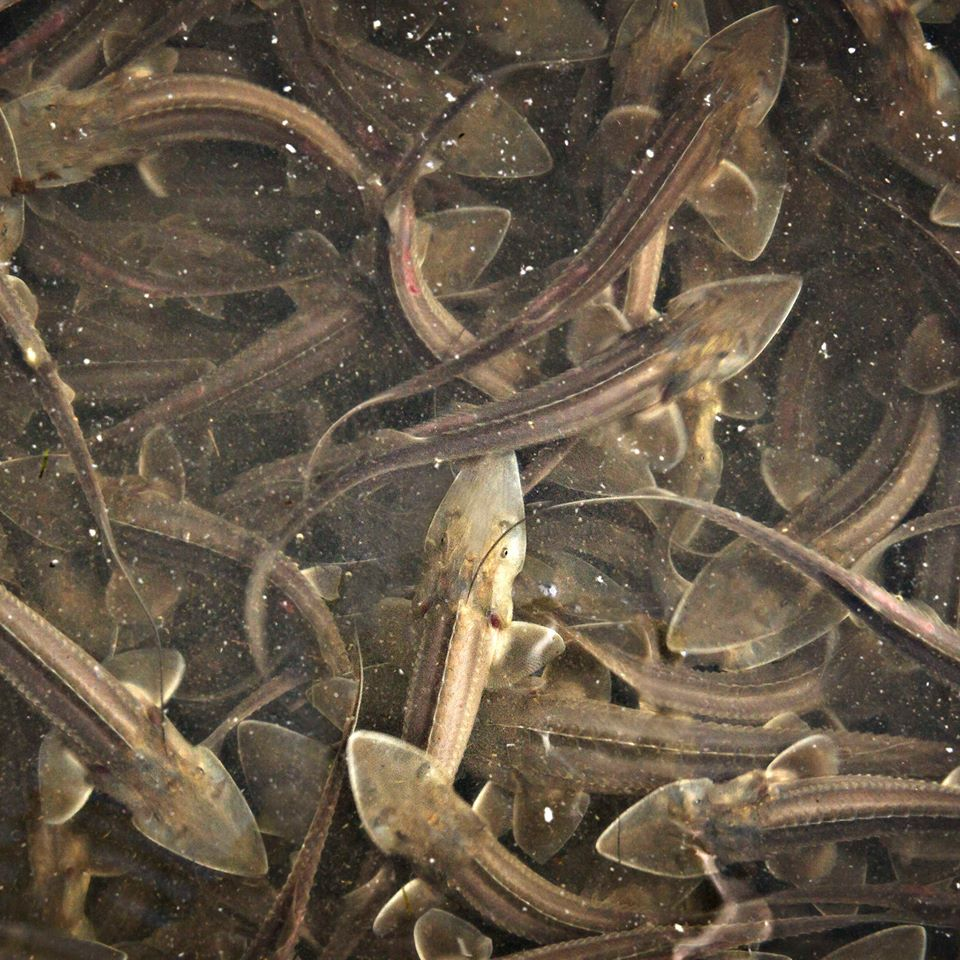
Juveniles at a hatchery.

The lower reaches of the Platte River, a more than 30-mile (48 km) stretch from the Elkhorn River to its confluence with the Missouri River, has suitable spawning habitat for pallid sturgeon, although no conclusive evidence has been found that spawning is occurring in this region. Along with the lower Yellowstone River, the lower Platte River was identified as one of the best of the remaining regions with the potential for the natural spawning.

In Missouri, at the Lisbon Bottoms section of the Big Muddy National Fish and Wildlife Refuge, wild pallid sturgeon larvae were collected in 1998. These nonhatchery-raised larvae were the first recovered on the lower Missouri River in the previous 50 years. The recovery was made along a side channel of the Missouri River that had been developed to provide suitable habitat for pallid sturgeon and other fish spawning. The side channel was apparently being used by the larva pallid sturgeon for protection from the swifter currents of the Missouri River.

In 2007, the USFWS concluded that hatchery-based reproduction efforts should be continued, along with monitoring of any population changes, to determine the effectiveness of human intervention. The 2007 findings also emphasized the need to determine the most likely areas of spawning, to identify any parasite or disease that may be impacting the reproductive capabilities of pallid sturgeon, and to examine engineering possibilities that may permit recreation of suitable habitats without reducing the USFWS's ability to protect people from harmful and destructive flooding, and to maintain its ability to provide adequate water impoundment for irrigation and recreation purposes.
