= Stephen A. Forbes State Recreation Area =

State park in Illinois, United States

- IUCN category V (protected landscape/seascape)
- Location within Illinois Location within the United States
- Location: Marion County, Illinois, United States
- Nearest city: Kinmundy, Illinois
- Coordinates: 38°43′47″N 88°46′08″W
- Area: 3,103 acres (1,256 ha)
- Established: 1959
- Governing body: Illinois Department of Natural Resources

Stephen A. Forbes State Recreation Area is an Illinois state park on 3,103 acres (1,256 ha) in Marion County, Illinois, United States. It was named for Stephen Alfred Forbes.

== See also ==
- Stephen Alfred Forbes
