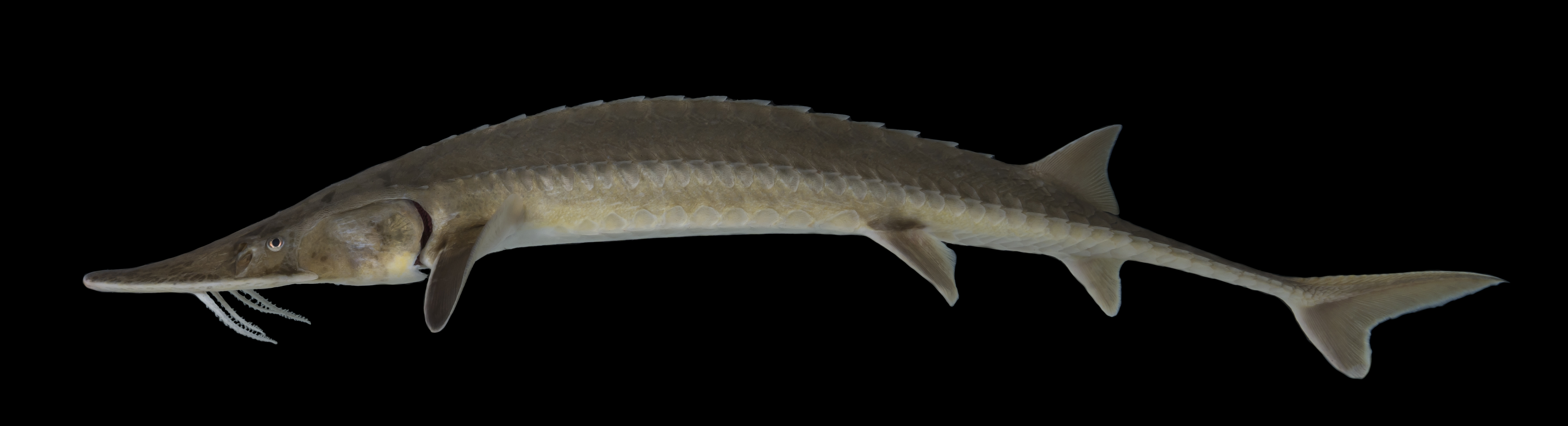

Conservation status
- Vulnerable (IUCN 3.1)
- CITES Appendix II

Scientific classification
- Kingdom: Animalia
- Phylum: Chordata
- Class: Actinopterygii
- Order: Acipenseriformes
- Family: Acipenseridae
- Genus: Scaphirhynchus
- Species: S. platorynchus

Binomial name
- Scaphirhynchus platorynchus (Rafinesque 1820)
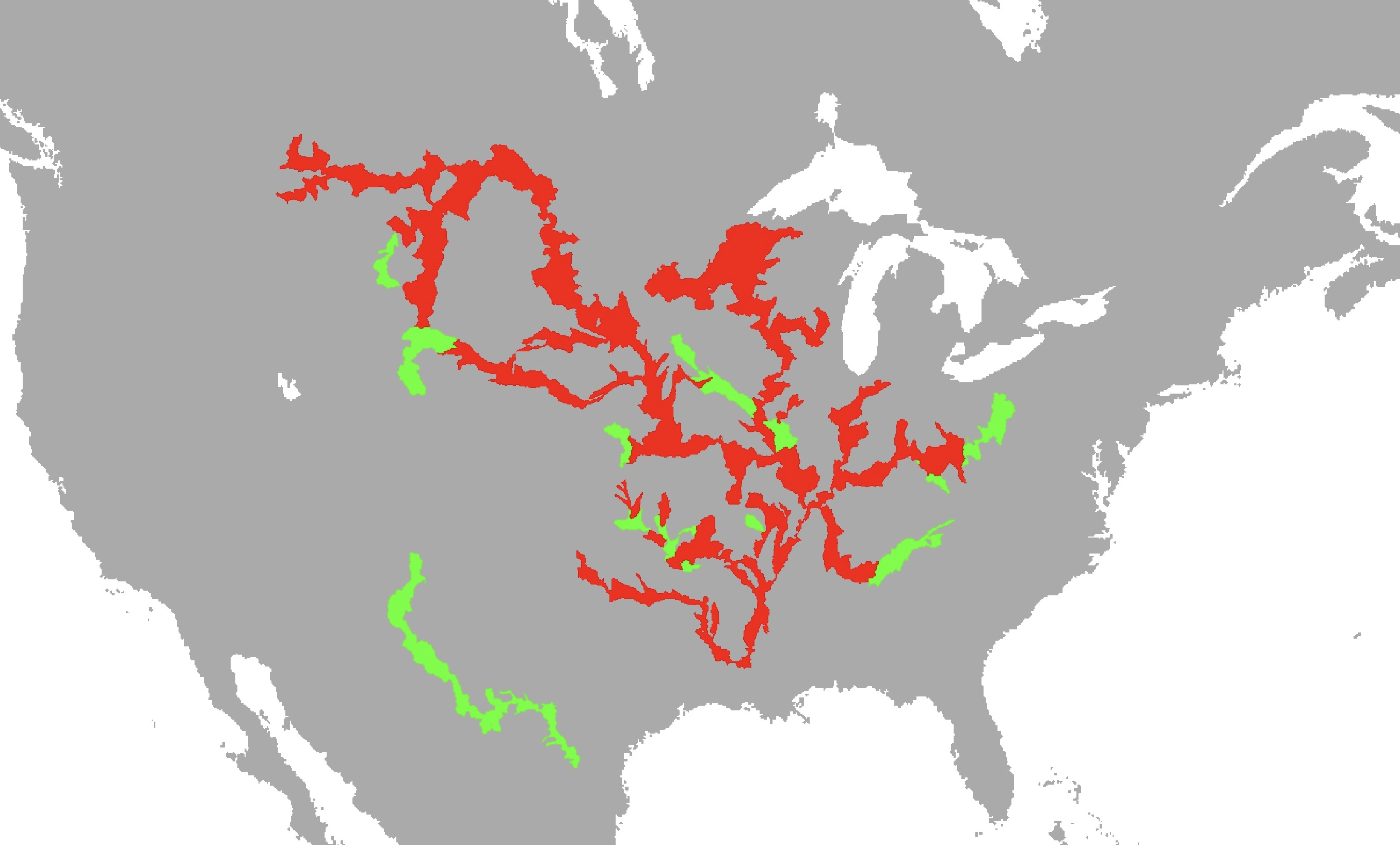
- Red: extant Green: extinct

Synonyms
- Acipenser platorynchus Rafinesque 1820; Scaphirhynchops platorynchus (Rafinesque 1820); Scaphirhynchus rafinesquii Heckel 1835

= Shovelnose sturgeon =

Species of fish

The shovelnose sturgeon (Scaphirhynchus platorynchus) is the smallest species of freshwater sturgeon native to North America. It is often called hackleback, sand sturgeon, or switchtail. Switchtail refers to the long filament found on the upper lobe of the caudal fin (often broken off as adults). Shovelnose sturgeon are the most abundant sturgeon found in the Missouri River and Mississippi River systems, and were formerly a commercially fished sturgeon in the United States of America (Pflieger 1997). In 2010, they were listed as threatened under the U.S. Endangered Species Act due to their resemblance to the endangered pallid sturgeon (S. albus), with which shovelnose sturgeon are sympatric.

== Description ==
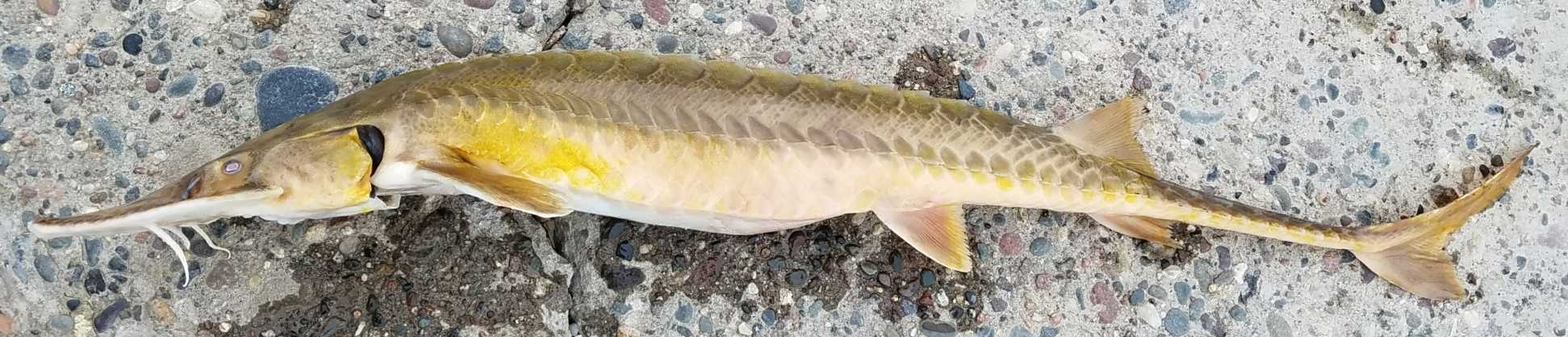
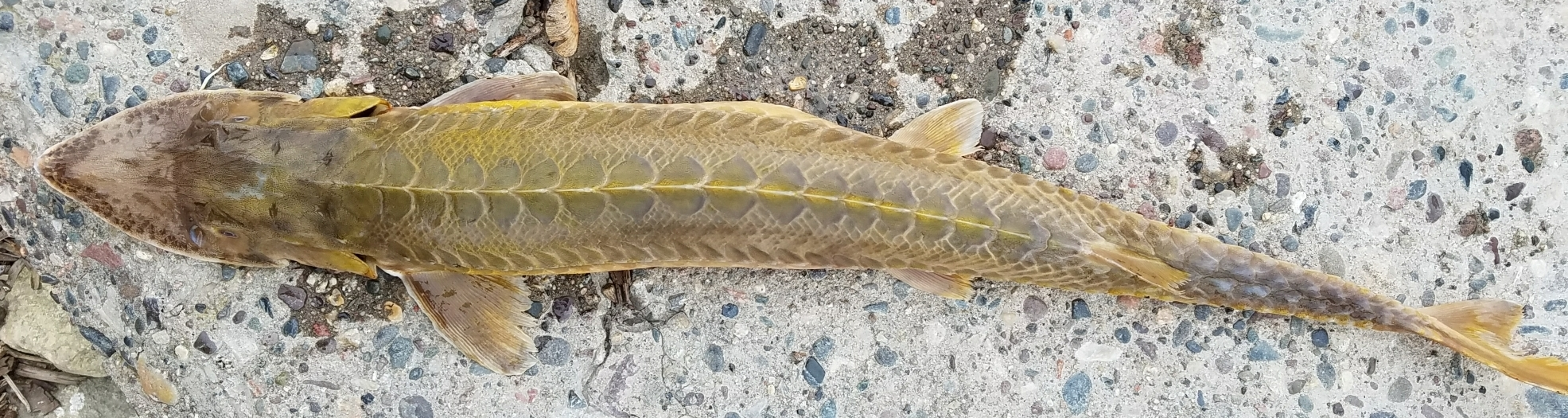
In Minnesota (lateral and dorsal view)
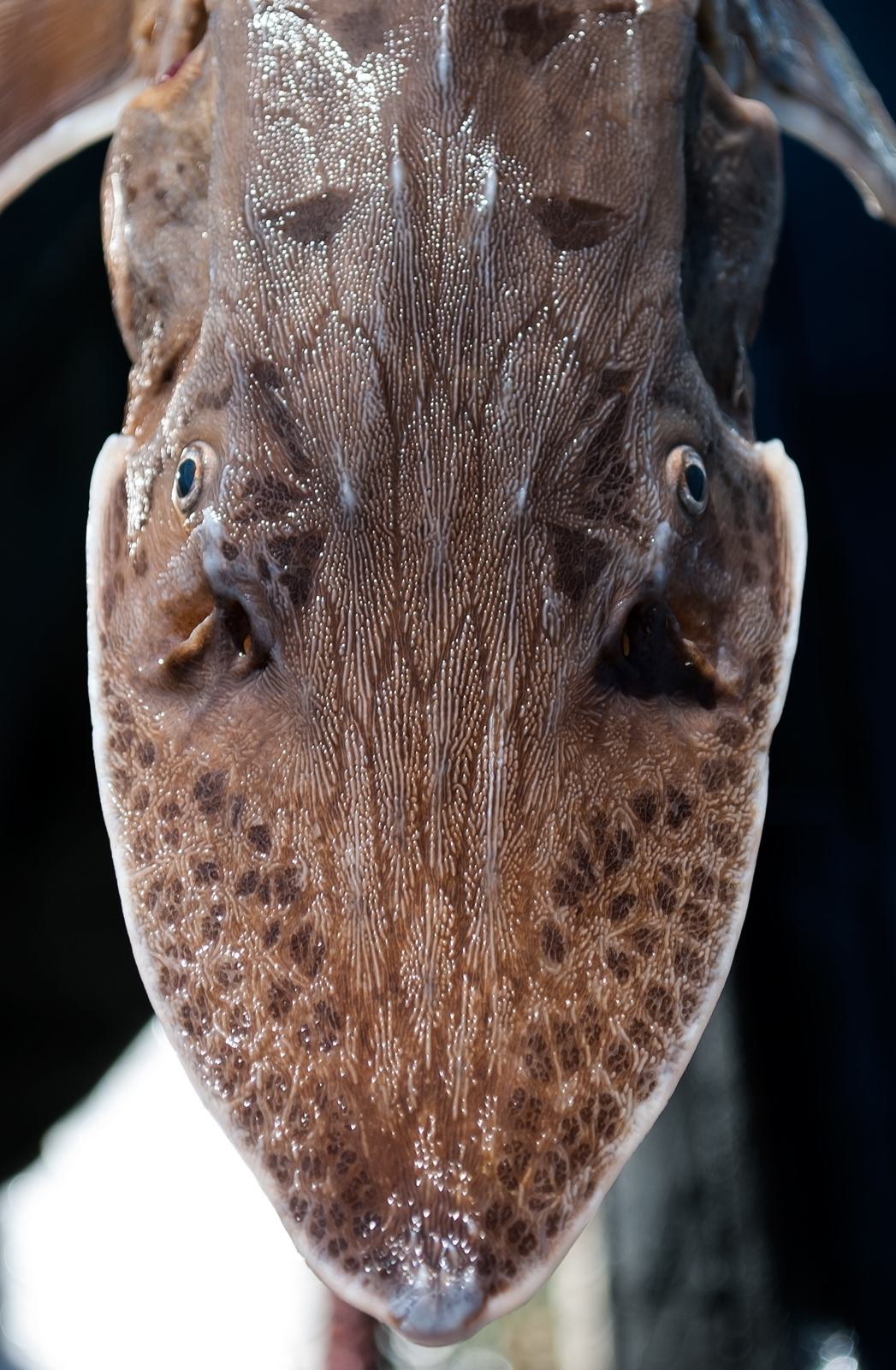
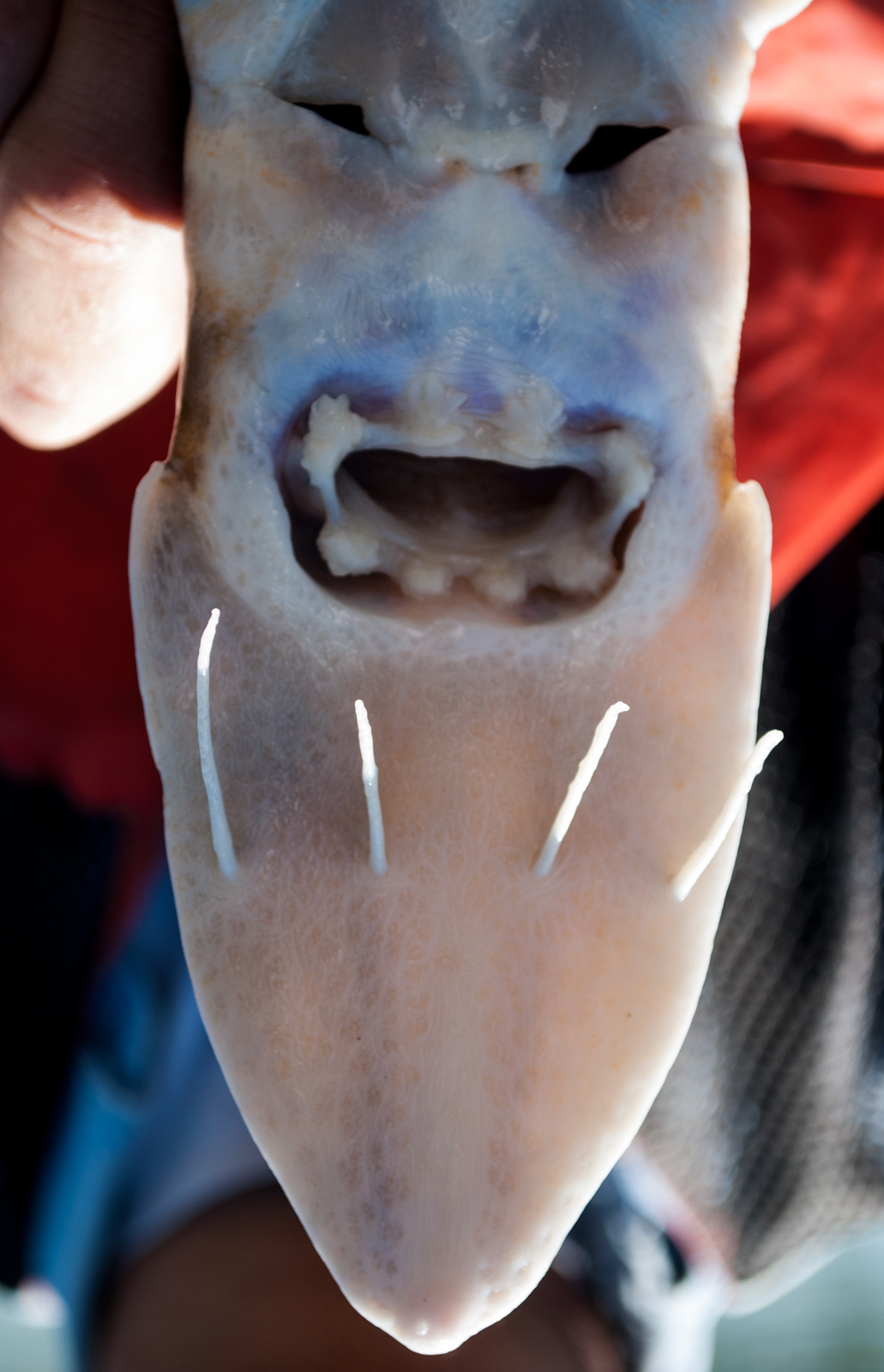
In Wisconsin (dorsal and ventral view)

The sturgeons of the family Acipenseridae have bony scutes along the sides and back and four barbels on the underside of the rostrum. A total of 25 extant species of sturgeon are recognized, including 17 within the genus Acipenser. Sturgeon are distributed around the northern part of the Northern Hemisphere (holarctic distribution) and have marine, freshwater, and anadromous members. Sturgeons, including the shovelnose, are highly regarded for their flesh and their roe, from which premium grades of caviar are made (Barton 2007).

They can reach 1 metre (39 in) in length and up to 4.8 kilograms (11 lb) in weight but 50–85 centimetres (20–33 in) and 2.5 kilograms (5.5 lb) is more common.

The scientific name Scaphirhynchus, Greek, means "spade snout", and platorynchus, Greek, means "broad snout". It has a bill-like snout. The shovelnose sturgeon is characterized by a long slender filament on the upper lobe of the caudal fin. They have a flattened rostrum (modified snout) that is also shovel-shaped. There are four fringed barbels on the ventral side of the rostrum that can be found in a straight line, which is equidistant from the mouth opening to the tip of the snout, unlike pallid sturgeon. The belly of the shovelnose sturgeon is covered with scale-like plates, which is another distinguishing factor from pallid sturgeon who have primarily scaleless bellies. Coloration of the shovelnose sturgeon ranges from a light-brown to buff with a white belly (Pflieger 1997).

== Distribution, habitat, and reproduction ==
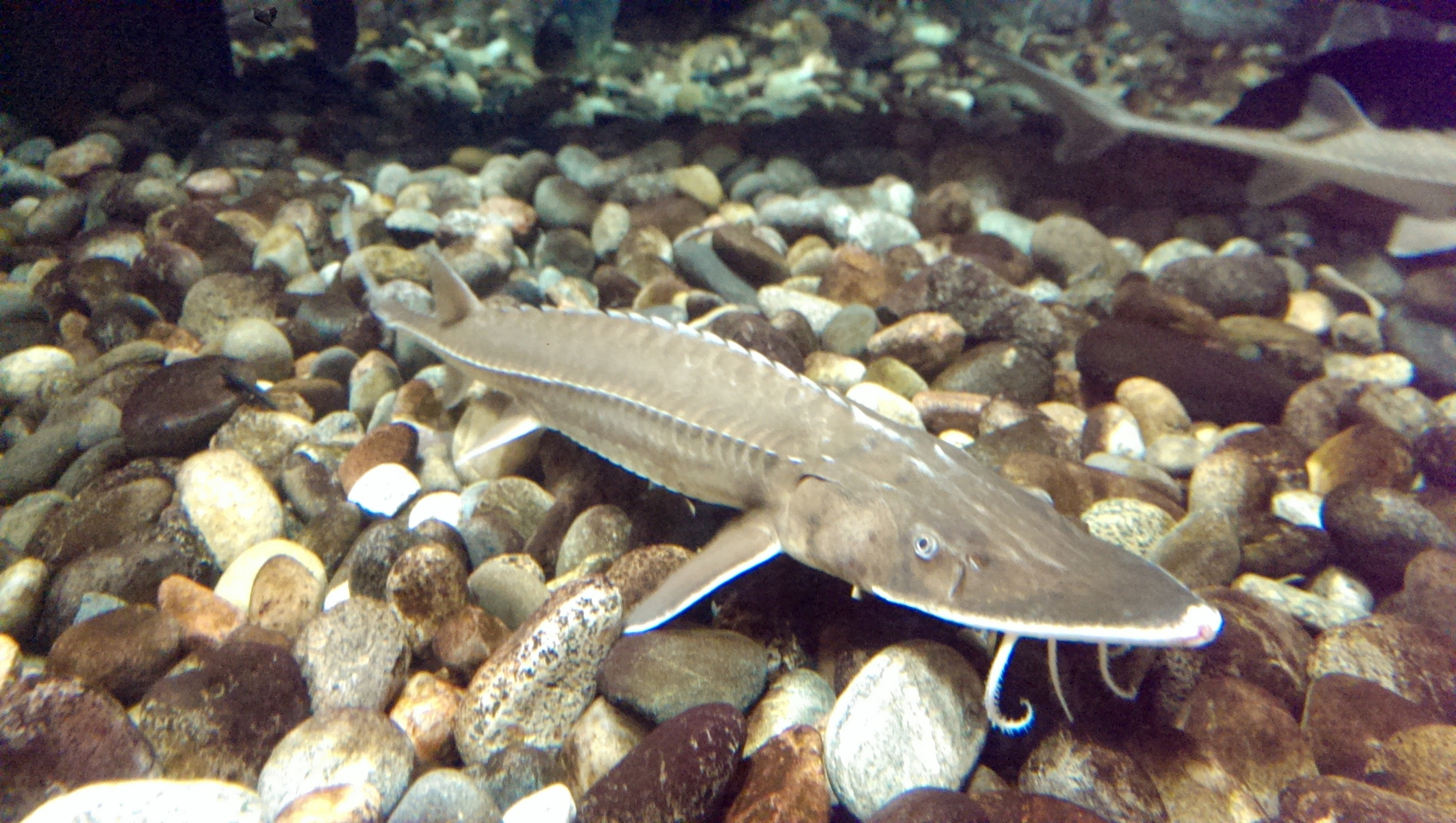
Shovelnose sturgeon

The shovelnose sturgeon, as its distribution represents, is impacted very little by turbidity. The Missouri River and the Mississippi River systems tend to carry high sediment loads. Here the sturgeon inhabits the open channel or main channel areas of the large rivers. It lives on the bottom, often in areas with swift current and sand or gravel bottom. As with many riverine fish species, the shovelnose sturgeon does not have a restricted home range and may travel long distances (Pflieger 1997).

The shovelnose sturgeon feeds on the bottom, using its highly protrusible mouth to suck up its food. The diet is mainly aquatic insect larvae, consisting principally of mayflies, true flies (Diptera), and caddisflies. The sturgeon also feed on crustaceans, worms, and small fish (Carlson et al. 1985;Held 1969). As a result of bottom feeding, it is a host to the glochidia (larvae) of several species of freshwater mollusc, including Quadrula pustulosa (pimpleback), Obovaria olivaria (hickorynut) and Lampsilis teres (yellow sandshell). It is the only known host of the hickorynut mussel.

A typical sturgeon's life history includes a migration from feeding grounds to breeding grounds in large rivers. During spawning, behavior changes and swimming near the surface occurs. Females do not spawn every year and spawning chronology is not readily evident. Spawning takes place over gravel in fairly swift water. Eggs hatch after 3 to 5 days, and the larvae—about 1 cm long—drift downstream to suitable rearing areas in the river (Barton 2007). Carlson et al. (1985) found that the growth of the shovelnose sturgeon is relatively slow, reaching 21.3 inches (54 cm) in five years.

== Conservation ==
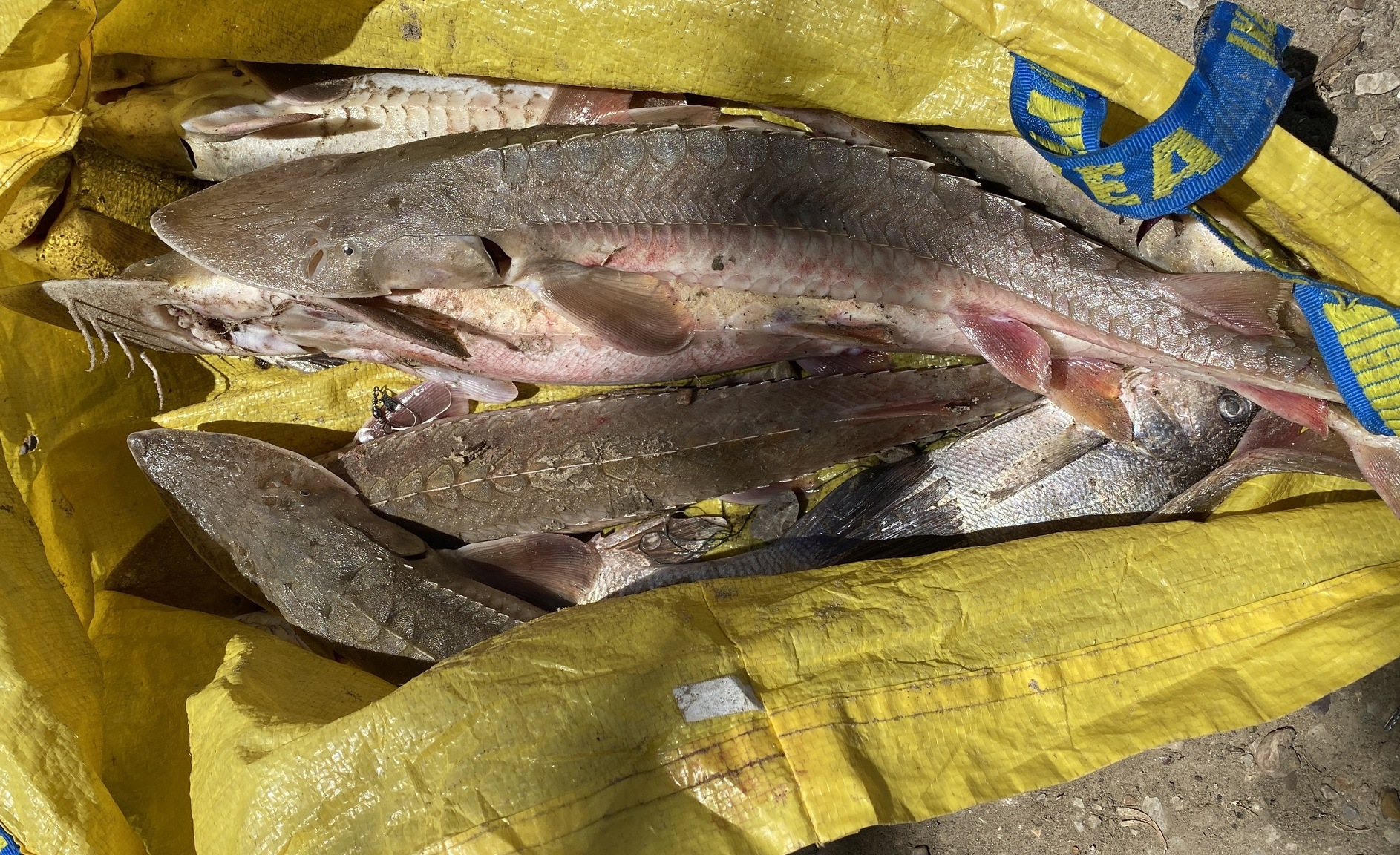
Fisherman's catch, Illinois

In 1997, it was estimated that roughly 25 tons of Shovelnose sturgeon were harvested each year for their roe and for eating. The roe of the shovelnose sturgeon was marketed as "hackleback" caviar. As old-world sources of Caspian and Black Sea sturgeon caviar became overfished, especially in the wake of the collapse of the Soviet Union, roe from shovelnose sturgeon became commercially important. The flesh of the sturgeon is widely considered a delicacy, especially smoked sturgeon. Poaching of the shovelnose sturgeon is becoming a problem, as they must be 8–10 years old before spawning can occur, and females do not become gravid every year. There has some interest in marketing the shovelnose sturgeon as an aquarium species. In 2010, the shovelnose sturgeon was listed as threatened under the U.S. Endangered Species Act due to its resemblance to the endangered pallid sturgeon (Scaphirhynchus albus), with which shovelnose sturgeon are sympatric.
