= Spottail darter =

Conservation status
- Least Concern (IUCN 3.1)

Scientific classification
- Kingdom: Animalia
- Phylum: Chordata
- Class: Actinopterygii
- Division: Teleostei
- Order: Perciformes
- Family: Percidae
- Genus: Etheostoma
- Species: E. squamiceps

Binomial name
- Etheostoma squamiceps D. S. Jordan, 1877

Species of fish

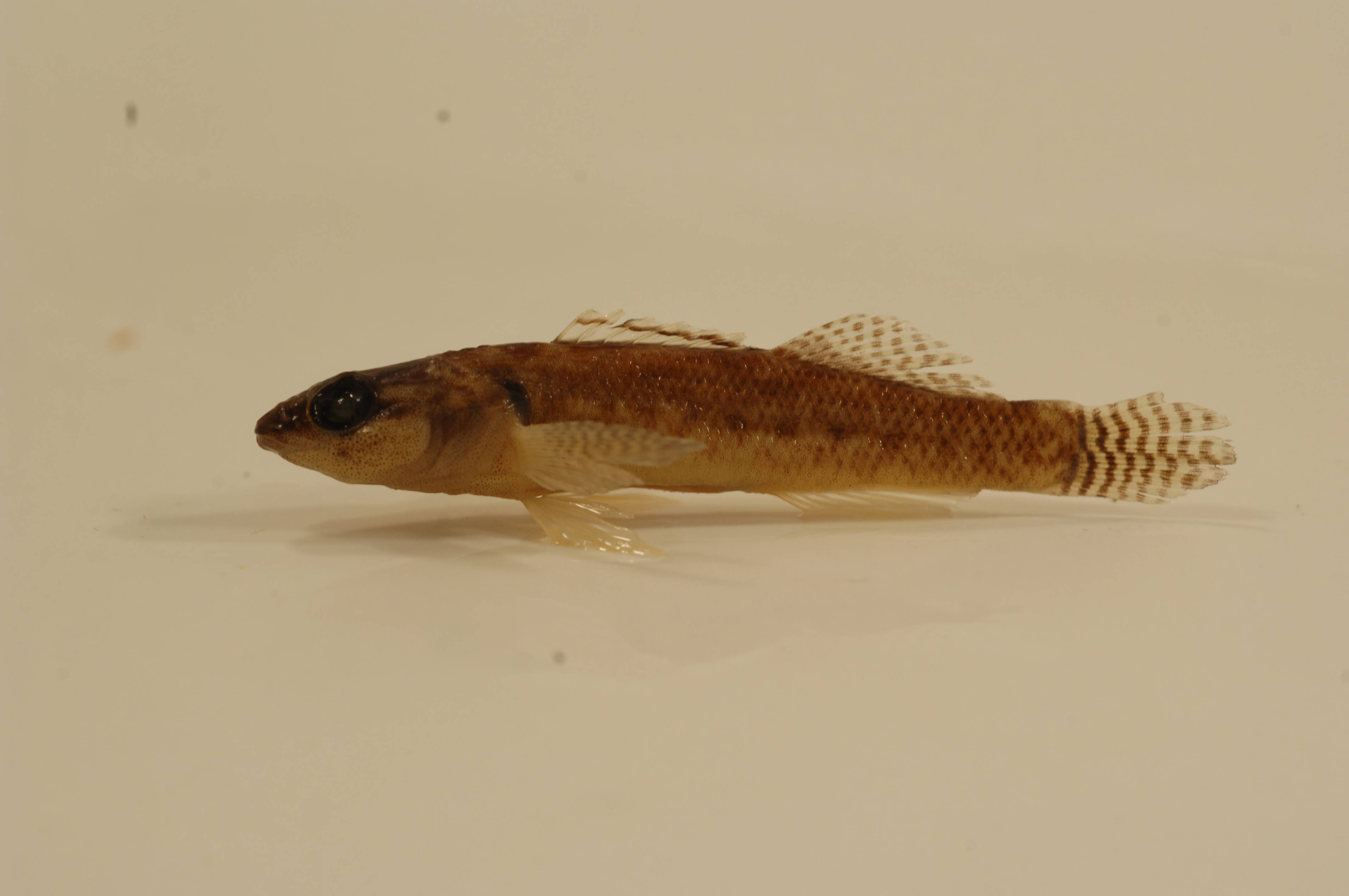
Spottail darter

The spottail darter (Etheostoma squamiceps) is a species of freshwater ray-finned fish, a darter from the subfamily Etheostomatinae, part of the family Percidae, which also contains the perches, ruffes and pikeperches. It is endemic to the eastern United States. It is found in the Ohio River basin and in the Red River system of the Cumberland River drainage. It inhabits rocky pools and nearby riffles of flowing waters up to the size of small rivers.

== Description ==
The spottail darter takes its common name from the three spots at the base of the caudal fin. This species can reach a length of 8.8 centimetres (3.5 in) TL though most only reach about 4.6 centimetres (1.8 in).

== Habitat and ecology ==
The spottail darter inhabits quiet rocky pools of headwaters, creeks, and small rivers with either large flat rocks or with bedrock bottom; individuals hide in crevices and under ledges, and they may be in quiet riffles in late summer when water in pools is too low to provide cover. Eggs are laid on undersides of slab stones in shallow pools.

== Conservation ==
The Spottail darter is currently of relatively low conservation concern and does not require significant additional protection or major management, monitoring, or research action. No major threats are known.

== Taxonomy ==
The spottail darter was first formally described in 1877 by the American ichthyologist David Starr Jordan (1851–1931) with the type locality given as Russellville in Logan County, Kentucky. The specific name is a compound of squamus meaning "scale" and ceps meaning "head", a reference to the scaled head of this species. It is regarded as a member of the subgenus Catonotus.
