= Prairie Research Institute =

Research institute in Illinois, U.S.

Coordinates: 40°6′4.4″N 88°13′44.8″W

- Established: 2008
- Focus: Natural and cultural resources, data and collections, environmental monitoring, sustainable economic development, public health and safety
- Executive Director: Praveen Kumar, PhD
- Staff: > 1,000
- Slogan: Home of the Illinois State Scientific Surveys
- Formerly called: Institute of Natural Resource Sustainability (2008–2011)
- Address: 615 E. Peabody Dr.
- Location: Champaign, Illinois, United States
- Website: prairie.illinois.edu

The Prairie Research Institute is a multidisciplinary research institute charged with providing objective research, expertise, and data on the natural and cultural resources of Illinois. It was established as a unit of the University of Illinois Urbana-Champaign by a Public Act of the Illinois State Legislature in 2008. The institute comprises five state scientific surveys: the Illinois Natural History Survey (INHS), the Illinois State Archaeological Survey (ISAS), the Illinois State Geological Survey (ISGS), the Illinois State Water Survey (ISWS), and the Illinois Sustainable Technology Center (ISTC). The institute has a combined total staff of more than 700 employees, with facilities located on the Urbana-Champaign campus of the University of Illinois, and field offices and research stations throughout the state.

In FY 2026, the state appropriated US$14.4 million through the university to fund the institute.

== Legislative mandate ==
In 2008, with the passage of Public Act 95-728, also known as the Illinois Scientific Surveys Act (110 ILCS 425)), the Illinois State Legislature established the Prairie Research Institute at the University of Illinois Urbana-Champaign. The Scientific Surveys Act also transferred all the rights, duties, powers, property, and functions of the Scientific Surveys and the Sustainable Technology Center from the Illinois Department of Natural Resources to the Prairie Research Institute. Under the Scientific Surveys Act, the Scientific Surveys are authorized to investigate, study, conserve and develop Illinois' natural and cultural resources; collaborate with and advise Illinois, other states, and the federal government about Illinois' natural resources; disseminate and educate the public about their research and investigations; and maintain relationships between and among the Scientific Surveys and Illinois' public and private colleges and universities. The institute itself is governed by the University of Illinois board of trustees, with its executive director reporting directly to the university's vice chancellor for research and innovation.

== Research ==
Researchers at the institute are engaged in basic and applied research across a spectrum of disciplines including agriculture and forestry, biodiversity and ecosystem health, atmospheric resources, climate and associated natural hazards, cultural resources and history of human settlements, disease and public health, emerging pests, fisheries and wildlife, energy and industrial technology, mineral resources, pollution prevention and mitigation, and water resources. Examples include impact and control of invasive carp, Lyme disease vector ecology, Illinois water supply quality and quantity investigations, geologic carbon sequestration, development of geospatial tools, discovery and excavation of massive prehistoric settlements surrounding Cahokia in advance of new bridge construction, persistence of estrogens in dairy farm wastewater, electronics re-use to minimize electronic waste, and monitoring atmospheric deposition of radioisotopes in North America following the Fukushima reactor incident.

== Collections and data ==
The institute is an important repository for many of Illinois' cultural and natural resource collections—whether archaeological, biological, and mineral. INHS' biological collections include insects, crustaceans, mollusks, annelids, reptiles and amphibians, birds, mammals, algae, bryophytes, fishes, fungi, and vascular plants. Most collections are also global in geographic coverage for many groups. For example, the INHS insect collection has more than 6,500,000 curated specimens and is one of the largest and oldest in North America; digitization of the specimens and metadata from this collection continues with support from the National Science Foundation.

The Illinois State Geological Survey conducts basic and applied geological research, creates new geologic maps, and gathers and manages the state's geological data. ISGS houses the legislatively mandated Illinois Geological Samples Library, a repository for drill-hole samples in Illinois, including cores drilled for mineral exploration and geologic investigations, as well as paleontological collections.

The Illinois State Water Survey studies water resources. Founded in 1895, the ISWS was originally tasked with surveying Illinois waters to trace the spread of waterborne disease and help develop sanitary standards for drinking water, over the years the ISWS has expanded to include scientific research and service programs related to water and atmospheric resources in Illinois.

The Illinois State Archaeological Survey curates research collections from more than 3,000 Illinois archaeological sites, including The Cahokia Mounds State Historic Site near St. Louis, Missouri.

Since its inception in 1985, the Illinois Sustainable Technology Center has been helping implement sustainable solutions to environmental and economic challenges locally and across Illinois by helping both citizens and businesses in Illinois prevent pollution, conserve natural resources, and reduce waste. ISTC continues to be a catalyst for the development of more sustainable technologies, processes, and practices, and does this through an integrated program of research, demonstration projects, technical assistance, and communication.

The Prairie Research Institute Library, formed from the merger of the State Scientific Survey libraries, holds more than 45,000 titles and 81,000 items on earth and atmospheric sciences, ecology, environmental science, environmental sustainability, natural resources, and natural history with an emphasis on the state of Illinois and the surrounding region. The institute also collects and disseminates data on many aspects of the Illinois environment including weather and climate, water resources including surface and groundwater, oil and mineral resources, maps and geospatial data, and the distributions of plants and animals including native and invasive species.

== Public engagement ==
Starting in 2009, the institute has hosted the Naturally Illinois Expo each March, concurrently with the Open House events of the College of Agriculture Environmental and Consumer Sciences, and College of Engineering at the University of Illinois at Urbana-Champaign. The target audience of Expo includes Illinois K-12 students and the public. The Illinois Natural History Survey's Traveling Science Center visits schools and communities throughout Illinois to offer education on habitats and species diversity in the state. The Illinois State Geological Survey hosts regular field trips to locations of geological note; field trip guidebooks summarize the features of the destinations. The annual governor's Sustainability Awards, organized by the Illinois Sustainable Technology Center, recognize achievements in sustainability in Illinois, in both the private and public sectors.

== Administration ==
The institute executive director reports to the vice chancellor for research and innovation of the University of Illinois Urbana-Champaign, and the institute is governed by the Board of Trustees of the University of Illinois. The Prairie Research Institute Advisory Board is the external advisory body charged with providing input and advice related to the scientific and research agenda, management, and funding of the institute. The board meets twice per year and transmits findings to the vice chancellor for research and innovation and the chancellor of the University of Illinois Urbana-Champaign, as well as the president of the University of Illinois System.

== History ==
In July 2008, the Institute for Natural Resource Sustainability was established within the University of Illinois to house four State Scientific Surveys (INHS, ISGS, ISWS, and ISTC). In February 2010, the Illinois Transportation Archaeological Research Program (ITARP), which had been housed within the University of Illinois at Urbana-Champaign Department of Anthropology, became the Illinois State Archaeological Survey (ISAS) and joined the institute. In May 2011, the name of the institute was changed to the Prairie Research Institute.

Each of the five divisions of the Prairie Research Institute has its own unique history, but there is much shared history, particularly among the Geological, Natural History, and Water Surveys, which have been connected administratively to one another and headquartered at the University of Illinois Urbana-Champaign since the early 20th century. This collective history is documented in the State Scientific Surveys Legislative Histories, published in 2024.

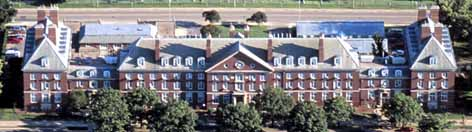
Natural Resources Building, Peabody Drive, Champaign, Illinois. Dedicated in 1940, and the current location of Prairie Research Institute headquarters.

In 1917, the State Laboratory of Natural History and research duties of the State Entomologist's Office merged and were renamed the State Natural History Survey, which along with Illinois State Geological Survey and Illinois State Water Survey were placed in the Illinois Department of Registration and Education. The Board of Natural Resources was established to administer the Surveys, its members being the director of the new department, the president of the University of Illinois or designee, and appointed representatives of core disciplines of biology, geology, engineering, chemistry, and forestry. In the 1930s, the State of Illinois appropriated $300,000 which was supplemented by a $245,454 Public Works Administration grant for a new building to house Illinois State Geological Survey and Illinois Natural History Survey operations. The Natural Resources Building, located on Peabody Drive in Champaign, was dedicated on November 15, 1940. Wings were added on the east and west ends of the original building in 1950. As of 2012, the headquarters of the Prairie Research Institute is in this building, along with many collections and laboratories of the Illinois State Geological Survey and Illinois Natural History Survey. There are numerous additional facilities of the institute located on the University of Illinois campus and in various locations around the state. In 1978, the Illinois Institute of Natural Resources was established by the Illinois General Assembly by a public act which transferred the three Surveys and related units out of the Illinois State Department of Registration and Education, effective January 1979. The creation of this institute was driven by:

a growing awareness that the state's economic and social well-being is dependent on the prudent management of our natural resources and a recognition that resource issues are complex and intertwined and cannot be dealt with successfully if the connections between issues are ignored.

The legislative mandate of the Institute of Natural Resources was:

to investigate practical problems, implement studies, conduct research and provide assistance, information and data relating to the technology and administration of environmental protection; energy; the natural history, entomology, zoology and botany of this State; the geology and natural resources of this State; the water resources and weather of this State; and the archeological and cultural history of this State.

In addition to the three Scientific Surveys, the Illinois Institute of Natural Resources included Divisions of Environmental Management, Resource Development, Resource Extension Service, the Illinois State Museum, plus The General Office in Springfield. The director of the institute was Frank Beal. The Board of Natural Resources and Conservation continued to administer the institute. In 1981 the Illinois Institute of Natural Resources became the Illinois Department of Energy and Natural Resources, whose six divisions were the Illinois State Geological Survey, the Illinois Natural History Survey, the Illinois State Water Survey, Energy Programs, Policy and Planning, and the Illinois State Museum. The Hazardous Waste Research and Information Center (now the Illinois Sustainable Technology Center) was established within the Department of Energy and Natural Resources in 1984.

In 1995, Governor Jim Edgar issued an Executive Order to restructure the state's environmental agencies. The Illinois Department of Energy and Natural Resources (in part), Illinois Department of Conservation, Illinois Department of Mines and Minerals, and several other related government units were combined to form the Illinois Department of Natural Resources (IDNR). The Surveys (now four, including the Hazardous Waste Research and Information Center) plus the Illinois State Museum were placed under the Office of Scientific Research and Analysis within IDNR. The Surveys remained in IDNR until the institute was established within the University of Illinois at Urbana-Champaign in 2008.
