= Blackfin darter =

Conservation status
- Least Concern (IUCN 3.1)

Scientific classification
- Kingdom: Animalia
- Phylum: Chordata
- Class: Actinopterygii
- Order: Perciformes
- Family: Percidae
- Genus: Etheostoma
- Species: E. nigripinne

Binomial name
- Etheostoma nigripinne Braasch & Mayden, 1985

Species of fish

The blackfin darter (Etheostoma nigripinne) is a species of freshwater ray-finned fish, a darter from the subfamily Etheostomatinae, part of the family Percidae, which also contains the perches, ruffes and pikeperches. It is endemic to the eastern United States where it occurs in the Tennessee River drainage, being found from the Paint Rock River to the Duck River system. It is an inhabitant of small rivers and creeks, living in small pools and nearby riffles. This species can reach a length of 8.8 centimetres (3.5 in) TL.
