= Illinois Natural History Survey =

Research institution in Illinois, U.S.

- Established: 1858
- Location: 1816 South Oak Street, Champaign, Illinois, United States
- Coordinates: 40.092916°N 88.239787°W
- Type: Natural History
- Director: Michael J. Dreslik
- Website: inhs.illinois.edu

The Illinois Natural History Survey (INHS), located on the campus of the University of Illinois Urbana-Champaign in Champaign, Illinois, is an active research institution with over 200 staff members, and it maintains one of the largest State-operated museums in the United States, with collections totaling over 9.5 million specimens of amphibians, annelids, birds, crustaceans, fish, fungi, insects, mammals, mollusks, plants, and reptiles from around the world. It is part of the Prairie Research Institute.
