= List of fishes of Florida =

This article lists the fish in the rivers, lakes, and oceans of the U.S. state of Florida.

Common name	Scientific name	Image	Native	Non- native	Fresh water	Salt water	Notes
African jewelfish	Hemichromis bimaculatus			check	check		
African pompano	Alectis ciliaris		check			check	Also known as the pennant-fish and threadfin trevally.
African tigerfish	Hydrocynus vittatus			check	check		
Alabama bass	Micropterus henshalli		check		check		
Alabama shad	Alosa alabamae		check		check	check	
Albacore	Thunnus alalunga		check			check	
Alewife	Alosa pseudoharengus			check	check	check	
Alligator gar	Atractosteus spatula		check		check		Largest exclusively freshwater fish found in North America, measuring 8 to 10 feet.
Almaco jack	Seriola rivoliana		check			check	
Amazon sailfin catfish	Pterygoplichthys pardalis			check	check		
Amberjack	Seriola		check			check	
American anglerfish	Lophius americanus		check			check	
American butterfish	Peprilus triacanthus		check			check	
American conger	Conger oceanicus		check			check	
American eel	Anguilla rostrata		check		check	check	Lives in fresh water and estuaries, migrating to spawn in the Sargasso Sea.
American fourspot flounder	Hippoglossina oblonga		check			check	
American gizzard shad	Dorosoma cepedianum		check		check	check	
American harvestfish	Peprilus paru		check			check	
American paddlefish	Polyodon spathula			check	check		
American pickerel	Esox americanus		check		check		Also known as redfin pickerel, brook pickerel, and grass pickerel
American pocket shark	Mollisquama mississippiensis		check			check	
American sailfin eel	Letharchus velifer		check			check	
American shad	Alosa sapidissima		check		check	check	
Amur carp	Cyprinus rubrofuscus			check	check		
Anchovy	Anchoviella		check			check	
Antilles catshark	Galeus antillensis		check			check	
Apalachee shiner	Pteronotropis grandipinnis		check		check		
Apalachicola redhorse	Moxostoma sp. 1 "Apalachicola"		check		check		
Arabian angelfish	Pomacanthus asfur			check		check	
Argentina georgei	Argentina georgei		check			check	
Arrow blenny	Lucayablennius zingaro		check			check	
Asian arowana	Scleropages formosus			check	check		
Asian carp				check	check		
Asian swamp eel	Monopterus albus			check	check		They are invasive in the Florida Everglades.
Atlantic angel shark	Squatina dumeril		check			check	
Atlantic bigeye	Priacanthus arenatus		check			check	
Atlantic bluefin tuna	Thunnus thynnus		check			check	
Atlantic bonito	Sarda sarda		check			check	
Atlantic bumper	Chloroscombrus chrysurus		check			check	
Atlantic cod	Gadus morhua		check			check	
Atlantic croaker	Micropogonias undulatus		check			check	
Atlantic flyingfish	Cheilopogon melanurus		check			check	
Atlantic goldeneye tilefish	Caulolatilus chrysops		check			check	
Atlantic goliath grouper	Epinephelus itajara		check			check	
Atlantic hagfish	Myxine glutinosa		check			check	
Atlantic herring	Clupea harengus		check			check	
Atlantic mackerel	Scomber scombrus		check			check	
Atlantic manta ray	Mobula yarae		check			check	
Atlantic menhaden	Brevoortia tyrannus		check			check	
Atlantic moonfish	Selene setapinnis		check			check	
Atlantic needlefish	Strongylura marina		check		check	check	
Atlantic rubyfish	Erythrocles monodi		check			check	
Atlantic sailfish	Istiophorus albicans		check			check	
Atlantic saury	Scomberesox saurus		check			check	
Atlantic scombrops	Scombrops oculatus		check			check	
Atlantic sharpnose shark	Rhizoprionodon terraenovae		check			check	
Atlantic silverside	Menidia menidia		check			check	
Atlantic sixgill shark	Hexanchus vitulus		check			check	
Atlantic spadefish	Chaetodipterus faber		check			check	
Atlantic Spanish mackerel	Scomberomorus maculatus		check			check	
Atlantic stingray	Hypanus sabinus		check		check	check	Common in the freshwater St. Johns River
Atlantic sturgeon	Acipenser oxyrinchus oxyrinchus		check		check	check	
Atlantic tarpon	Megalops atlanticus		check		check	check	
Atlantic threadfin	Polydactylus octonemus		check			check	
Atlantic thread herring	Opisthonema oglinum		check			check	
Atlantic torpedo	Tetronarce nobiliana		check			check	
Atlantic tripletail	Lobotes surinamensis		check			check	
Atlantic weasel shark	Paragaleus pectoralis		check			check	Very rare.
Atlantic wreckfish	Polyprion americanus		check			check	
Backwater darter	Etheostoma zonifer		check		check		
Balao halfbeak	Hemiramphus balao		check			check	
Bald blenny	Paraclinus infrons		check			check	
Balloonfish	Diodon holocanthus		check			check	
Ballyhoo	Hemiramphus brasiliensis		check			check	
Band cusk-eel	Ophidion holbrookii		check			check	
Banded blenny	Paraclinus fasciatus		check			check	
Banded butterflyfish	Chaetodon striatus		check			check	
Banded cichlid	Heros severus			check	check		
Banded leporinus	Leporinus fasciatus			check	check		
Banded pygmy sunfish	Elassoma zonatum		check			check	
Banded rudderfish	Seriola zonata		check			check	
Banded sunfish	Enneacanthus obesus		check		check		
Banded tilapia	Tilapia sparrmanii			check	check		
Banded topminnow	Fundulus cingulatus		check		check		
Bandfin shiner	Coccotis zonistius		check		check		
Bandtail puffer	Sphoeroides spengleri		check			check	
Bandtail searobin	Prionotus ophryas		check			check	
Bank butterflyfish	Prognathodes aya		check			check	
Banner blenny	Emblemaria atlantica		check			check	
Bannerfin shiner	Cyprinella leedsi		check		check		
Bar jack	Caranx ruber		check			check	
Red barbfish	Scorpaena brasiliensis		check			check	
Barfin blenny	Malacoctenus versicolor		check			check	
Barfin goby	Coryphopterus alloides		check			check	
Bartail goby	Coryphopterus thrix		check			check	
Barred blenny	hypleurochilus bermudensis		check			check	
Barred hamlet	Hypoplectrus puella		check			check	
Barred sorubim	Pseudoplatystoma fasciatum			check	check		
Barrelfish	Hyperoglyphe perciformis		check			check	
Basking shark	Cetorhinus maximus		check			check	The second largest living fish after the whale shark.
Batfish	Platax orbicularis			check		check	Non-native, invasive species.
Bay anchovy	Anchoa mitchilli		check			check	
Bay whiff	Citharichthys spilopterus		check			check	
Bearded brotula	Brotula barbata		check			check	
Beaugregory	Stegastes leucostictus		check			check	
Belted sandfish	Serranus subligarius		check			check	
Beluga	Huso huso			check	check	check	
Bentfin devil ray	Mobula thurstoni		check			check	
Bermuda blue angelfish	Holacanthus bermudensis		check			check	
Bermuda chub	Kyphosus sectatrix		check			check	
Bicolor damselfish	Stegastes partitus		check			check	
Bicolored false moray	Chlopsis bicolor		check			check	
Bicolour parrotfish	Cetoscarus bicolor			check		check	
Bigeye mojarra	Eucinostomus havana		check			check	
Bigeye sand tiger	Odontaspis noronhai		check			check	
Bigeye scad	Selar crumenophthalmus		check			check	
Bigeye thresher	Alopias superciliosus		check			check	
Bigeye tuna	Thunnus obesus		check			check	
Bighead carp	Hypophthalmichthys nobilis			check	check		
Bigmouth buffalo	Ictiobus cyprinellus		check	check	check		
Bigmouth sleeper	Gobiomorus dormitor		check			check	
Bignose shark	Carcharhinus altimus		check			check	
Black acara	Cichlasoma bimaculatum			check	check		
Black arowana	Osteoglossum ferreirai			check	check		
Black carp	Mylopharyngodon piceus			check	check		
Black crappie	Pomoxis nigromaculatus		check		check		
Black drum	Pogonias cromis		check			check	
Black durgon	Melichthys niger		check			check	
Black grouper	Mycteroperca bonaci		check			check	
Black hamlet	Hypoplectrus nigricans		check			check	
Black jack	Caranx lugubris		check			check	
Black madtom	Noturus funebris		check		check		
Black margate	Anisotremus surinamensis		check			check	
Black marlin	Istiompax indica		check			check	Very rare
Black seabass	Centropristis striata		check			check	
Black sharkminnow	Labeo chrysophekadion			check	check		(Hammocks Lake, Miami)
Black snapper	Apsilus dentatus		check			check	
Blackbanded darter	Percina nigrofasciata		check		check		
Blackbanded sunfish	Enneacanthus chaetodon		check		check		
Blackbar soldierfish	Myripristis jacobus		check			check	
Blackbelly blenny	Stathmonotus hemphillii		check			check	
Blackbelly skate	Breviraja nigriventralis		check			check	
Blackcap basslet	Gramma melacara		check			check	
Blackcheek tonguefish	Symphurus plagiusa		check			check	
Blackchin tilapia	Sarotherodon melanotheron			check	check		
Black-ear wrasse	Halichoeres poeyi		check			check	
Blackedge moray eel	Gymnothorax nigromarginatus		check			check	
Blackfin blenny	Paraclinus nigripinnis		check			check	
Blackfin cardinalfish	Astrapogon puncticulatus		check			check	
Blackfin snapper	Lutjanus buccanella		check			check	
Blackfin tuna	Thunnus atlanticus		check			check	
Blackmouth shiner	Miniellus melanostomus		check		check		
Blacknose shark	Carcharhinus acronotus		check			check	
Blackpored eel	Ophichthus melanoporus		check			check	
Blackspotted topminnow	Fundulus olivaceus		check		check		
Blacktail moray eel	Gymnothorax kolpos		check			check	
Blacktail redhorse	Moxostoma poecilurum		check		check		
Blacktip shark	Carcharhinus limbatus		check			check	
Blacktip shiner	Lythrurus atrapiculus		check		check		
Blind torpedo	Benthobatis marcida		check			check	
Blood parrot cichlid	Amphilophus citrinellus × Vieja melanurus			check	check		
Blood-red jewel cichlid	Hemichromis lifalili			check	check		
Blotched catshark	Scyliorhinus meadi		check			check	
Blotched foxface	Siganus unimaculatus			check		check	
Blotched snakehead	Channa maculata			check	check		
Blue catfish	Ictalurus furcatus		check	check	check		
Blue chromis	Chromis cyanea		check			check	
Blue hamlet	Hypoplectrus gemma		check			check	
Blue marlin	Makaira nigricans		check			check	
Blue parrotfish	Scarus coeruleus		check			check	
Blue runner	Caranx crysos		check			check	
Blue shark	Prionace glauca		check			check	
Blue striped grunt	Haemulon sciurus		check			check	
Blue surgeonfish	Paracanthurus hepatus			check		check	
Blue tang	Acanthurus coeruleus		check			check	
Blue tilapia	Oreochromis aureus			check	check		
Bluefin killifish	Lucania goodei		check		check		
Blueback herring	Alosa aestivalis		check		check	check	
Bluefish	Pomatomus saltatrix		check		check	check	
Bluegill	Lepomis macrochirus		check		check		
Bluehead chub	Nocomis leptocephalus		check		check		
Bluehead wrasse	Thalassoma bifasciatum		check			check	
Bluelip parrotfish	Cryptotomus roseus		check			check	
Bluenose shiner	Pteronotropis welaka		check		check		
Bluespotted cornetfish	Fistularia commersonii		check			check	
Bluespotted ribbontail ray	Taeniura lymma			check		check	
Blue-spotted sunfish	Enneacanthus gloriosus		check		check		
Bluestripe shiner	Cyprinella callitaenia		check		check		
Bluntnose sixgill shark	Hexanchus griseus		check			check	
Bluntnose stingray	Hypanus say		check			check	
Bobo mullet	Joturus pichardi		check		check	check	
Boga	Haemulon vittatum		check			check	
Bonefish	Albula vulpes		check			check	
Bonnethead	Sphyrna tiburo		check			check	
Bonnetmouth	Emmelichthyops atlanticus		check			check	
Bowfin	Amia calva		check		check		
Bramble shark	Echinorhinus brucus		check			check	
Brazilian cownose ray	Rhinoptera brasiliensis		check			check	
Brazilian electric ray	Narcine brasiliensis		check			check	
Brazilian lizardfish	Saurida brasiliensis		check			check	
Brazilian sardinella	Sardinella brasiliensis		check			check	
Brazilian tucunaré	Cichla			check	check		
Bridled burrfish	Chilomycterus antennatus		check			check	
Bridled goby	Coryphopterus glaucofraenum		check			check	
Bristletooth conger	Xenomystax congroides		check			check	
Broadbanded lanternshark	Etmopterus gracilispinis		check			check	
Broadgill catshark	Apristurus riveri		check			check	
Broadnose worm eel	Myrophis platyrhynchus		check			check	
Broad-striped anchovy	Anchoa hepsetus		check			check	
Brook silverside	Labidesthes sicculus		check		check		
Brown Bullhead	Ameiurus nebulosus		check		check		
Brown chromis	Chromis multilineata		check			check	
Brown darter	Etheostoma edwini		check		check		
Brown garden eel	Heteroconger longissimus		check			check	
Brown hoplo	Hoplosternum littorale			check	check		
Brown trout	Salmo trutta			check	check	check	
Bucktooth parrotfish	Sparisoma radians		check			check	
Buffalo trunkfish	Lactophrys trigonus		check			check	
Bull pipefish	Syngnathus springeri		check			check	
Bull shark	Carcharhinus leucas		check		check	check	
Bullet mackerel	Auxis rochei		check			check	
Bullnose ray	Myliobatis freminvillei		check			check	
Bullseye snakehead	Channa marulius			check	check		
Butter hamlet	Hypoplectrus unicolor		check			check	
Butterfish	Poronotus triacanthus		check			check	
Caesar grunt	Haemulon carbonarium		check			check	
Candy basslet	Liopropoma carmabi		check			check	
Cardinal snapper	Pristipomoides macrophthalmus		check			check	
Cardinal soldierfish	Plectrypops retrospinis		check			check	
Caribbean blenny	Emblemaria caldwelli		check			check	
Caribbean chestnut moray	Enchelycore carychroa		check			check	
Caribbean cocoa damselfish	Stegastes xanthurus		check			check	
Caribbean lanternshark	Etmopterus hillianus		check			check	
Caribbean longsnout butterflyfish	Prognathodes aculeatus		check			check	
Caribbean ocellated moray	Gymnothorax ocellatus		check			check	
Caribbean reef shark	Carcharhinus perezii		check			check	
Caribbean roughshark	Oxynotus caribbaeus		check			check	
Caribbean sharpnose-puffer	Canthigaster rostrata		check			check	
Caribbean skate	Dipturus teevani		check			check	
Carolina hammerhead	Sphyrna gilberti		check			check	
Cero mackerel	Scomberomorus regalis		check			check	
Chaenopsid blenny	Stathmonotus tekla		check			check	
Chain dogfish	Scyliorhinus retifer		check			check	
Chain moray	Echidna catenata		check			check	
Chain pickerel	Esox niger		check		check		
Chain pipefish	Syngnathus louisianae		check			check	
Chalk bass	Serranus tortugarum		check			check	
Chameleon cichlid	Australoheros facetus			check	check		
Chanchita	Cichlasoma dimerus			check	check		
Channa aurolineata	Channa aurolineata			check	check		
Channel catfish	Ictalurus punctatus		check		check		
Checkered blenny	Starksia ocellata		check			check	
Checkered puffer	Sphoeroides testudineus		check			check	
Cherubfish	Centropyge argi		check			check	
Chocolate surgeonfish	Acanthurus pyroferus			check		check	
Choctaw bass	Micropterus sp. cf. punctulatus		check		check		
Choctawhatchee darter	Etheostoma davisoni		check		check		
Chupare stingray	Styracura schmardae		check			check	
Clear chub	Hybopsis winchelli		check		check		
Clearnose skate	Rostroraja eglanteria		check			check	
Clown featherback	Chitala ornata			check	check		
Clown goby	Gobiodon		check			check	
Clown wrasse	Halichoeres maculipinna		check			check	
Clown wrasse	Coris aygula			check		check	
Coastal darter	Etheostoma colorosum		check		check		
Coastal shiner	Notropis petersoni		check		check		
Cobia	Rachycentron canadum		check			check	
Collared eel	Kaupichthys nuchalis		check			check	
Colon goby	Coryphopterus dicrus		check			check	
Combtooth blenny	Hypleurochilus pseudoaequipinnis		check			check	
Common carp	Cyprinus carpio			check	check		
Common clownfish	Amphiprion ocellaris			check		check	
Common dolphinfish	Coryphaena hippurus		check			check	
Common false moray	Kaupichthys hyoproroides		check			check	
Common goldfish	Cyprinidae			check	check		
Common lionfish	Pterois miles			check		check	
Common rudd	Scardinius erythrophthalmus			check	check		
Common sand diver	Synodus intermedius		check			check	
Common snook	Centropomus undecimalis		check		check	check	
Common thresher	Alopias vulpinus		check			check	
Conchfish	Astrapogon stellatus		check			check	
Coral blenny	Paraclinus cingulatus		check			check	
Coney	Cephalopholis fulva		check			check	
Convict cichlid	Archocentrus nigrofasciatus			check	check		
Cookiecutter shark	Isistius brasiliensis		check			check	
Copper shark	Carcharhinus brachyurus		check			check	Also known as bronze whaler shark
Coral scorpionfish	Scorpaena albifimbria		check			check	
Cottonwick grunt	Haemulon melanurum		check			check	
Cownose ray	Rhinoptera bonasus		check			check	
Creek chubsucker	Erimyzon oblongus		check		check		
Creole wrasse	Clepticus parra		check			check	
Atlantic Creole-fish	Paranthias furcifer		check			check	
Crested goby	Lophogobius cyprinoides		check			check	
Crevalle jack	Caranx hippos		check			check	
Croaking gourami	Trichopsis vittata			check	check		
Crystal darter	Crystallaria asprella		check		check		
Cuban gar	Atractosteus tristoechus			check	check		
Cuban dogfish	Squalus cubensis		check			check	
Cuban ribbontail catshark	Eridacnis barbouri		check			check	
Cubbyu	Pareques acuminatus		check			check	
Cubera snapper	Lutjanus cyanopterus		check			check	
Cypress darter	Etheostoma proeliare		check		check		
Cypress minnow	Hybognathus hayi		check		check		
Darter goby	Ctenogobius boleosoma		check			check	
Dash goby	Ctenogobius saepepallens		check			check	
Deepwater dab	Poecilopsetta beanii		check			check	
Deepwater squirrelfish	Sargocentron bullisi		check			check	
Diamond blenny	Malacoctenus boehlkei		check			check	
Diamond killifish	Fundulus xenicus		check			check	
Dixie chub	Semotilus thoreauianus		check		check		
Doctorfish	Garra rufa			check	check	check	Escaped from beauty spas
Doctorfish tang	Acanthurus chirurgus		check			check	
Dog snapper	Lutjanus jocu		check			check	
Dollar sunfish	Lepomis marginatus		check		check	check	
Downy blenny	Gobioclinus kalisherae		check			check	
Drab sole	Achirus achirus		check		check	check	
Dusky blenny	Malacoctenus gilli		check			check	
Dusky cardinalfish	Phaeoptyx pigmentaria		check			check	
Dusky damselfish	Stegastes adustus		check			check	
Dusky pipefish	Syngnathus floridae		check			check	
Dusky shark	Carcharhinus obscurus		check			check	
Dusky shiner	Pteronotropis cummingsae		check		check		
Dusky smooth-hound	Mustelus canis		check			check	
Dusky squirrelfish	Sargocentron vexillarium		check			check	
Dwarf catshark	Scyliorhinus torrei		check			check	
Dwarf frogfish	Antennarius pauciradiatus		check			check	
Dwarf goatfish	Upeneus parvus		check			check	
Dwarf herring	Jenkinsia lamprotaenia		check			check	
Dwarf rainbowfish	Melanotaenia praecox			check	check		
Dwarf round herring	Jenkinsia lamprotaenia		check			check	
Dwarf scorpionfish	Scorpaena elachys		check			check	
Dwarf seahorse	Hippocampus zosterae		check			check	
Dwarf wrasse	Doratonotus megalepis		check			check	
Eastern mosquitofish	Gambusia holbrooki		check		check		
Eastern mudminnow	Umbra pygmaea		check		check		
Electric eel	Electrophorus electricus			check	check		
Emperor angelfish	Pomacanthus imperator			check		check	
Eastern happy	Astatotilapia calliptera			check	check		
Eastern mosquitofish	Gambusia holbrooki		check		check		
Eptatretus minor	Eptatretus minor		check			check	
Eurasian carp	Cyprinus carpio			check	check		
Everglades pygmy sunfish	Elassoma evergladei		check		check		
Eyed flounder	Bothus ocellatus		check			check	
False herring	Harengula clupeola		check			check	
Fantail	Fantail			check	check		
Fat sleeper	Dormitator maculatus		check			check	
Fat snook	Centropomus parallelus		check		check	check	
Featherduster blenny	Hypleurochilus multifilis		check			check	
Finetooth shark	Carcharhinus isodon		check			check	
Firemouth cichlid	Thorichthys meeki			check	check		
Five-band surgeonfish	Acanthurus tractus		check			check	
Flagfin shiner	Pteronotropis signipinnis		check		check		
Flagfish	Jordanella floridae		check		check		
Flamefish	Apogon maculatus		check			check	
Flat needlefish	Ablennes hians		check			check	
Flathead catfish	Pylodictis olivaris		check		check		
Flathead grey mullet	Mugil cephalus		check			check	
Flier	Centrarchus macropterus		check		check		
Florida bass	Micropterus floridanus		check		check		
Florida blenny	Chasmodes saburrae		check			check	
Florida gar	Lepisosteus platyrhincus		check		check		
Florida lancelet	Branchiostoma floridae		check			check	
Florida pompano	Trachinotus carolinus		check			check	
Florida sand darter	Ammocrypta bifascia		check		check		
Flowerhorn cichlid				check	check		
Flying gurnard	Dactylopterus volitans		check			check	
Four stripe damselfish	Dascyllus melanurus			check		check	
Foureye butterflyfish	Chaetodon capistratus		check			check	
Freckled cardinalfish	Phaeoptyx conklini		check			check	
Freckled pike-conger	Hoplunnis macrura		check			check	
Freckled soapfish	Rypticus bistrispinus		check			check	
French angelfish	Pomacanthus paru		check			check	
French grunt	Haemulon flavolineatum		check			check	
Freshwater angelfish	Pterophyllum scalare			check	check		
Freshwater goby	Ctenogobius shufeldti		check			check	
Frigate tuna	Auxis thazard		check			check	
Frilled shark	Chlamydoselachus anguineus		check			check	
Frillfin goby	Bathygobius soporator		check			check	
Fringed filefish	Monacanthus ciliatus		check			check	
Fringed pipefish	Anarchopterus criniger		check			check	
Fringefin lanternshark	Etmopterus schultzi		check			check	
Gafftopsail catfish	Bagre marinus		check			check	
Gag grouper	Mycteroperca microlepis		check			check	
Galapagos shark	Carcharhinus galapagensis		check			check	
Garfish	Belone belone		check			check	
Giant cichlid	Boulengerochromis microlepis			check	check		
Giant devil ray	Mobula mobular		check			check	
Giant freshwater stingray	Urogymnus polylepis			check	check		
Giant oarfish	Regalecus glesne		check			check	
Giant oceanic manta ray	Mobula birostris		check			check	
Giant snakehead	Channa micropeltes			check	check		
Giant sunfish	Mola alexandrini		check			check	Very rare
Glass blenny	Emblemariopsis diaphana		check			check	
Glass goby	Coryphopterus hyalinus		check			check	
Glasseye snapper	Heteropriacanthus cruentatus		check			check	
Glassy sweeper	Pempheris schomburgkii		check			check	
GloFish	GloFish			check	check		
Goblin shark	Mitsukurina owstoni		check			check	
Golden basslet	Gramma dejongi		check			check	
Golden shiner	Notemigonus crysoleucas		check		check		
Golden silverside	Labidesthes vanhyningi		check		check		
Golden topminnow	Fundulus chrysotus		check		check		
Golden tilefish	Lopholatilus chamaeleonticeps		check			check	
Goldentail moray	Gymnothorax miliaris		check			check	
Goldfish	Carassius auratus			check	check		
Goldline blenny	Malacoctenus aurolineatus		check			check	
Goldspotted eel	Myrichthys ocellatus		check			check	
Goldspotted killifish	Floridichthys carpio		check			check	
Goldstripe darter	Etheostoma parvipinne		check		check		
Goliath grouper	Epinephelus itajara		check			check	Also known as jewfish
Goliath tigerfish	Hydrocynus goliath			check	check		
Goosehead scorpionfish	Scorpaena bergii		check			check	
Grass carp	Ctenopharyngodon idella			check	check		
Grass porgy	Calamus arctifrons		check			check	
Gray angelfish	Pomacanthus arcuatus		check			check	
Gray flounder	Etropus rimosus		check			check	
Gray snapper	Lutjanus griseus		check			check	
Graysby	Cephalopholis cruentata		check			check	
Great barracuda	Sphyraena barracuda		check			check	
Great hammerhead	Sphyrna mokarran		check			check	
Great northern tilefish	Lopholatilus chamaeleonticeps		check			check	
Great white shark	Carcharodon carcharias		check			check	Rare in some cases in Florida.
Greater amberjack	Seriola dumerili		check			check	
Greater soapfish	Rypticus saponaceus		check			check	
Green chromide	Etroplus suratensis			check	check		
Green lanternshark	Etmopterus virens		check			check	
Green moray	Gymnothorax funebris		check			check	
Green razorfish	Xyrichtys splendens		check			check	
Green sunfish	Lepomis cyanellus		check	check	check		
Green swordtail	Xiphophorus hellerii			check	check		
Greenblotch parrotfish	Sparisoma atomarium		check			check	
Greengill sunfish	Lepomis macrochirus × cyanellus			check	check		
Greenland shark	Somniosus microcephalus		check			check	
Gray conger	Conger esculentus		check			check	
Gray triggerfish	Balistes capriscus		check			check	
Grey grunt	Haemulon album		check			check	
Guachanche barracuda	Sphyraena guachancho		check			check	
Gulf bareye tilefish	Caulolatilus intermedius		check			check	
Gulf butterfish	Peprilus burti		check			check	
Gulf chimaera	Hydrolagus alberti		check			check	
Gulf Coast pygmy sunfish	Elassoma gilberti		check		check	check	
Gulf darter	Etheostoma swaini		check		check		
Gulf flounder	Paralichthys albigutta		check			check	
Gulf killifish	Fundulus grandis		check			check	
Gulf kingfish	Menticirrhus littoralis		check			check	
Gulf menhaden	Brevoortia patronus		check			check	
Gulf of Mexico fringed sole	Gymnachirus texae		check			check	
Gulf pipefish	Syngnathus scovelli		check			check	
Gulf Stream flounder	Citharichthys arctifrons		check			check	
Gulf sturgeon	Acipenser oxyrinchus desotoi		check		check	check	
Gulf surgeonfish	Acanthurus randalli		check			check	
Gulf toadfish	Opsanus beta		check			check	
Gulper shark	Centrophorus granulosus		check			check	
Guppy	Poecilia reticulata			check	check		
Hairy blenny	Labrisomus nuchipinnis		check			check	
Hamlet	Hypoplectrus		check			check	
Hardhead catfish	Arius felis		check			check	
hardhead silverside	Atherinomorus stipes		check			check	
Harlequin bass	Serranus tigrinus		check			check	
Harlequin darter	Etheostoma histrio		check		check		
Headlight fish	Diaphus effulgens		check			check	
Headwater catfish	Ictalurus lupus		check		check	check	
Hemichromis letourneuxi	Hemichromis letourneuxi			check	check		
High-hat	Pareques acuminatus		check			check	
Highfin blenny	Lupinoblennius nicholsi		check			check	
Highfin carpsucker	Carpiodes velifer		check		check		
Hickory shad	Alosa mediocris		check		check	check	
Hoary catshark	Apristurus canutus		check			check	
Hogchoker	Trinectes maculatus		check		check	check	
Hogfish	Lachnolaimus maximus		check			check	
Holocentrus adscensionis	Holocentrus adscensionis		check			check	
Honeycomb cowfish	Acanthostracion polygonius		check			check	
Honeycomb moray	Muraena melanotis		check			check	
Hoplunnis similis	Hoplunnis similis		check			check	
Horned blenny	Paraclinus grandicomis		check			check	
Horned searobin	Bellator militaris		check			check	
Horned whiff	Citharichthys cornutus		check			check	
Hornet cichlid	Pseudotropheus crabro			check	check		
Horse-eye jack	Caranx latus		check			check	
Horsehair eel	Gordiichthys irretitus		check			check	
Houndfish	Tylosurus crocodilus		check			check	
Hovering goby	Valenciennea		check			check	
Humpback grouper	Cromileptes altivelis			check		check	
Hunchback scorpionfish	Scorpaena dispar		check			check	
Hybrid striped bass	Morone chrysops × Morone saxatilis			check	check		Also known as sunshine bass, Cherokee bass or palmetto bass
Hybrid tilapia	Oreochromis			check	check		
Ide	Leuciscus idus			check	check		
Indigo hamlet	Hypoplectrus indigo		check			check	
Inland silverside	Menidia beryllina		check		check		
Inshore lizardfish	Synodus foetens		check			check	
Irish mojarra	Diapterus auratus		check			check	
Ironcolor shiner	Alburnops chalybaeus		check		check		
Jack Dempsey	Rocio octafasciata			check	check		
Jack-knifefish	Equetus lanceolatus		check			check	
Jaguar guapote	Parachromis managuensis			check	check		
Jewel fish	Hemichromis letourneuxi			check	check		
Jolthead porgy	Calamus bajonado		check			check	
Keel-jawed needlefish	Tylosurus acus		check			check	
Keeltail needlefish	Platybelone argalus		check			check	
Key brotula	Ogilbia cayorum		check			check	
Key silverside	Menidia conchorum		check			check	
King mackerel	Scomberomorus cavalla		check			check	
King snake eel	Ophichthus rex		check			check	
Kitefin shark	Dalatias licha		check			check	
Knobbed porgy	Calamus nodosus		check			check	
Koi	Cyprinus rubrofuscus var. "koi"			check	check		
Kōhaku	Cyprinus rubrofuscus var. Kōhaku			check	check		
Kollar carp	Cyprinus carpio × Carassius auratus			check	check		
Kryptolebias	Kryptolebias		check		check		
Ladyfish	Elops saurus		check			check	Also known as tenpounder
Lagoon triggerfish	Rhinecanthus aculeatus			check		check	Invasive
Lake chubsucker	Erimyzon sucetta		check		check		
Lancer dragonet	Paradiplogrammus bairdi		check			check	
Lane snapper	Lutjanus synagris		check			check	
Lantern bass	Serranus baldwini		check			check	
Large-scaled spiny-cheek sleeper	Eleotris amblyopsis		check		check		
Largehead hairtail	Trichiurus lepturus		check			check	
Largemouth bass	Micropterus salmoides		check		check		
Largespot lizardfish	Synodus macrostigmus		check			check	
Largetooth sawfish	Pristis pristis		check			check	
Least killifish	Heterandria formosa		check		check	check	
Least puffer	Sphoeroides parvus		check			check	
Leatherjack	Oligoplites saurus		check			check	
Lebranche mullet	Mugil liza		check			check	
Lemon shark	Negaprion brevirostris		check			check	
Leopard goby	Tigrigobius saucrum		check			check	
Lesser amberjack	Seriola fasciata		check			check	
Lesser devil ray	Mobula hypostoma		check			check	
Lesser electric ray	Narcine bancroftii		check			check	
Lichen moray eel	Gymnothorax hubbsi		check			check	
Lined lanternshark	Etmopterus bullisi		check			check	
Lined seahorse	Hippocampus erectus		check			check	
Lined sole	Achirus lineatus		check		check	check	
Lined topminnow	Fundulus lineolatus		check		check		
Little gulper shark	Centrophorus uyato		check			check	
Little tunny	Euthynnus alletteratus		check			check	
Littlehead porgy	Calamus proridens		check			check	
Live sharksucker	Echeneis naucrates		check			check	
Longbill spearfish	Tetrapturus pfluegeri		check			check	
Longear sunfish	Lepomis megalotis		check		check		
Longeye conger	Gnathophis bracheatopos		check			check	
Longface eel	Saurenchelys cognita		check			check	
Longfin damselfish	Stegastes diencaeus		check			check	
Longfin mako shark	Isurus paucus		check			check	
Longfin scorpionfish	Scorpaena agassizii		check			check	
Longfin yellowtail	Seriola rivoliana		check			check	
Longjaw minnow	Ericymba amplamala		check		check		
Longjaw squirrelfish	Neoniphon marianus		check			check	
Longlure frogfish	Antennarius multiocellatus		check			check	
Longnose gar	Lepisosteus osseus		check		check		
Longnose killifish	Fundulus similis		check			check	
Longnose shiner	Miniellus longirostris		check		check		
Longsnout butterflyfish	Forcipiger flavissimus		check			check	
Long-spine porcupinefish	Diodon holocanthus		check			check	
Longspine squirrelfish	Holocentrus rufus		check			check	
Lookdown	Selene vomer		check			check	
Lowland cichlid	Herichthys carpintis			check	check		
Luminous hake	Steindachneria argentea		check			check	
Lyre goby	Evorthodus lyricus		check			check	
Mackerel scad	Decapterus macarellus		check			check	
Mahi-mahi	Coryphaena hippurus		check			check	Also known as dolphinfish or dorado
Mahogany snapper	Lutjanus mahogoni		check			check	
Mangrove blenny	Lupinoblennius vinctus		check			check	
Mangrove gambusia	Gambusia rhizophorae		check			check	
Mangrove killifish	Kryptolebias marmoratus		check		check	check	
Man-of-war fish	Nomeus gronovii		check			check	
Manta ray	Manta birostris		check			check	
Manytooth conger	Conger triporiceps		check			check	
Marbled blenny	Paraclinus marmoratus		check			check	
Marbled grouper	Dermatolepis inermis		check			check	
Marbled moray	Uropterygius macularius		check			check	
Marbled puffer	Sphoeroides dorsalis		check			check	
Margate	Haemulon album		check			check	
Margined snake eel	Ophichthus cruentifer		check			check	
Margintail conger	Paraconger caudilimbatus		check			check	
Masked puffer	Arothron diadematus			check		check	
Masquerader hairy blenny	Labrisomus conditus		check			check	
Mayan cichlid	Mayaheros urophthalmus			check	check		
Megamouth shark	Megachasma pelagios		check			check	
Mekong giant catfish	Pangasianodon gigas			check	check		
Metallic lanternfish	Myctophum affine		check			check	
Metallic shiner	Pteronotropis metallicus		check		check		
Midas cichlid	Amphilophus citrinellus			check	check		
Midnight parrotfish	Scarus coelestinus		check			check	
Military barracuda	Sphyraena putnamae		check			check	
Mimic blenny	Gobioclinus guppyi		check			check	
Mirrorwing flyingfish	Hirundichthys speculiger		check			check	
Misty grouper	Hyporthodus mystacinus		check			check	
Molly miller	Scartella cristata		check			check	
Moorish idol	Zanclus cornutus			check		check	
Mottled conger moray	Enchelycore nigricans		check			check	
Mottled jawfish	Opistognathus maxillosus		check			check	
Mottled mojarra	Ulaema lefroyi		check			check	
Mountain mullet	Dajaus monticola		check		check		
Mozambique tilapia	Oreochromis mossambicus			check	check		
Mud sunfish	Acantharchus pomotis		check		check	check	
Mummichog	Fundulus heteroclitus		check		check		
Mushroom scorpionfish	Scorpaena inermis		check			check	
Mutton hamlet	Alphestes afer		check			check	
Mutton snapper	Lutjanus analis		check			check	
Naked sole	Gymnachirus nudus		check			check	
Nandopsis tetracanthus	Nandopsis tetracanthus			check	check		
Narrowfin smooth-hound	Mustelus norrisi		check			check	
Nassau grouper	Epinephelus striatus		check			check	
Neon goby	Elacatinus evelynae		check			check	
Neon goby	Elacatinus oceanops		check			check	
Neon tetra	Paracheirodon innesi			check	check		
Night sergeant	Abudefduf taurus		check			check	
Night shark	Carcharhinus signatus		check			check	
Nile perch	Lates niloticus			check	check		
Nile tilapia	Oreochromis niloticus			check	check		
Northern pike	Esox lucius			check	check	check	
Northern pipefish	Syngnathus fuscus		check			check	
Northern puffer	Sphoeroides maculatus		check			check	
Northern red snapper	Lutjanus campechanus		check			check	
Northern snakehead	Channa argus			check	check		
Northern sea robin	Prionotus carolinus		check			check	
Nurse shark	Ginglymostoma cirratum		check			check	
Obese dragonfish	Opostomias micripnus		check			check	
Obtuse barracuda	Sphyraena obtusata		check			check	
Ocean sunfish	Mola mola		check			check	
Ocean surgeon	Acanthurus bahianus		check			check	
Ocean triggerfish	Canthidermis maculata		check			check	
Ocean triggerfish	Canthidermis sufflamen		check			check	
Oceanic two-wing flyingfish	Exocoetus obtusirostris		check			check	
Oceanic whitetip shark	Carcharhinus longimanus		check			check	
Ocellated flounder	Ancylopsetta ommata		check			check	
Ocellated frogfish	Fowlerichthys ocellatus		check			check	
Ocellated moray	Gymnothorax saxicola		check			check	
Okaloosa darter	Etheostoma okaloosae		check		check		
Okefenokee pygmy sunfish	Elassoma okefenokee		check		check		
Opah	Lampris guttatus		check			check	
Ophidion josephi	Ophidion josephi		check			check	
Opossum pipefish	Microphis lineatus		check		check	check	
Orange scorpionfish	Scorpaena brasiliensis		check			check	
Orangebelly goby	Varicus marilynae		check			check	
Orange-spine surgeonfish	Naso lituratus			check		check	
Orangespotted filefish	Cantherhines pullus		check			check	
Orangespotted goby	Nes longus		check			check	
Orangespotted sunfish	Lepomis humilis		check		check		
Orbicular batfish	Platax orbicularis			check		check	
Orinoco peacock bass	Cichla orinocensis			check	check		
Orinoco sailfin catfish	Pterygoplichthys multiradiatus			check	check		
Oscar	Astronotus ocellatus			check	check		
Oyster toadfish	Opsanus tau		check			check	
Painted electric ray	Diplobatis pictus		check			check	
Palehead blenny	Gobioclinus gobio		check			check	
Pallid chub	Macrhybopsis pallida		check		check		
Pallid goby	Coryphopterus eidolon		check			check	
Palometa	Trachinotus goodei		check			check	
Papillose blenny	Acanthemblemaria chaplini		check			check	
Paraná sailfin catfish	Pterygoplichthys anisitsi			check	check		
Parrotfish	Scaridae		check			check	
Butterfly peacock bass	Cichla ocellaris			check	check		
peacock eel	Macrognathus siamensis			check	check		
Peacock grouper	Cephalopholis argus			check		check	
Pearl blenny	Entomacrodus nigricans		check			check	
Pearl cichlid	Geophagus brasiliensis			check	check		
Pelagic porcupinefish	Diodon eydouxii		check			check	
Pelagic stingray	Pteroplatytrygon violacea		check			check	
Peppermint goby	Coryphopterus lipernes		check			check	
Permit	Trachinotus falcatus		check		check	check	
Pigfish (redmouth grunt)	Orthopristis chrysoptera		check			check	
Pignosed arrowtooth eel	Dysomma brevirostre		check			check	
Pike topminnow	Belonesox belizanus			check	check		
Pilot fish	Naucrates ductor		check			check	
Pinfish	Lagodon rhomboides		check			check	
Pirambeba	Serrasalmus humeralis			check	check		
Pirapitinga	Piaractus brachypomus			check	check		
Pirarucu	Arapaima gigas			check	check		
Pirate perch	Aphredoderus sayanus		check		check		
Planehead filefish	Stephanolepis hispidus		check			check	
Plate fish	Bothus lunatus		check			check	
Plumed scorpionfish	Scorpaena grandicornis		check			check	
Pluto pygmy skate	Fenestraja plutonia		check			check	
Polygon moray	Gymnothorax polygonius		check			check	
Pompano dolphinfish	Coryphaena equiselis		check			check	
Pond loach	Misgurnus anguillicaudatus			check	check		
Porbeagle	Lamna nasus		check			check	
Porkfish	Anisotremus virginicus		check			check	
Portuguese dogfish	Centroscymnus coelolepis		check			check	
Princess parrotfish	Scarus taeniopterus		check			check	
Prussian carp	Carassius gibelio			check	check		
Pseudomyrophis nimius	Pseudomyrophis nimius		check			check	
Pseudotropheus demasoni	Pseudotropheus demasoni			check	check		
Puddingwife wrasse	Halichoeres radiatus		check			check	
Pugnose minnow	Opsopoeodus emiliae emiliae		check		check		
Pumpkinseed	Lepomis gibbosus			check	check		
Pumpkinseed × bluegill sunfish	Lepomis gibbosus × macrochirus			check	check		
Pugnose minnow	Opsopoeodus emiliae peninsularis		check		check		
Pugnose pipefish	Bryx dunckeri		check			check	
Purplemouth moray eel	Gymnothorax vicinus		check			check	
Pygmy killifish	Leptolucania ommata		check		check	check	
Pygmy moray	Anarchias similis		check			check	
Pygmy sunfish	Elassomatinae		check		check		
Queen angelfish	Holacanthus ciliaris		check			check	
Queen parrotfish	Scarus vetula		check			check	
Queen snapper	Etelis oculatus		check			check	
Queen triggerfish	Balistes vetula		check			check	
Quillback	Carpiodes cyprinus		check		check		
Rainbow parrotfish	Scarus guacamaia		check			check	
Rainbow runner	Elagatis bipinnulata		check			check	
Rainbow smelt	Osmerus mordax			check	check	check	
Rainbow snakehead	Channa bleheri			check	check		
Rainbow trout	Oncorhynchus mykiss			check	check	check	
Rainwater killifish	Lucania parva		check			check	
Red-bellied pacu	Piaractus brachypomus			check	check		
Red-bellied piranha	Pygocentrus nattereri			check	check		
Red devil cichlid	Amphilophus labiatus			check	check		
Red drum	Sciaenops ocellatus		check			check	Also known as channel bass
Red-eye round herring	Etrumeus sadina		check			check	
Red garra	Garra rufa			check	check		
Red grouper	Epinephelus morio		check			check	
Red hind	Epinephelus guttatus		check			check	
Red hogfish	Decodon puellaris		check			check	
Red jewelfish	Odontanthias cauoh		check			check	
Red lionfish	Pterois volitans			check		check	
Red porgy	Pagrus pagrus		check			check	
Red Sea sailfin tang	Zebrasoma desjardinii			check		check	
Red shiner	Cyprinella lutrensis			check	check		
Red snapper	Lutjanus campechanus		check			check	
Red-striped eartheater	Geophagus surinamensis			check	check		
Redband parrotfish	Sparisoma aurofrenatum		check			check	
Redbelly tilapia	Coptodon zillii			check	check		
Redbreast sunfish	Lepomis auritus		check		check		
Redbreast tilapia	Coptodon rendalli			check	check		
Redear sunfish	Lepomis microlophus		check		check		
Redeye chub	Pteronotropis harperi		check		check		
Redeye piranha	Serrasalmus rhombeus			check	check		
Redface eel	Monopenchelys acuta		check			check	
Redface topminnow	Fundulus rubrifrons		check		check		
Redfin needlefish	Strongylura notata notata		check			check	
Redfin pickerel	Esox americanus americanus		check		check		
Redhead cichlid	Vieja melanurus			check	check		
Redlip blenny	Ophioblennius atlanticus		check			check	
Redspotted sunfish	Lepomis miniatus		check		check		
Redtail catfish	Phractocephalus hemioliopterus			check	check		
Redtail garra	Garra panitvongi			check	check		
Redtail parrotfish	Sparisoma chrysopterum		check			check	
Reef butterflyfish	Chaetodon sedentarius		check			check	
Reef scorpionfish	Scorpaenodes caribbaeus		check			check	
Reef squirrelfish	Sargocentron coruscum		check			check	
Reef stonefish	Synanceia verrucosa			check		check	
Reticulate moray	Muraena retifera		check			check	
Ridged eel	Neoconger mucronatus		check			check	
Rio Grande cichlid	Herichthys cyanoguttatum			check	check		
River goby	Awaous banana		check		check		
River redhorse	Moxostoma carinatum		check		check		
Rock bass	Ambloplites rupestris		check		check		
Rock beauty	Holacanthus tricolor		check			check	
Rosy barb	Pethia conchonius			check	check		
Rosy blenny	Malacoctenus macropus		check			check	
Rosy razorfish	Xyrichtys martinicensis		check			check	
Rough shiner	Alburnops baileyi		check		check		
Rough silverside	Membras martinica		check		check	check	
Rough triggerfish	Canthidermis maculata		check			check	
Roughback batfish	Ogcocephalus parvus		check			check	
Roughhead blenny	Acanthemblemaria aspera		check			check	
Roughhead triplefin	Enneanectes boehlkei		check			check	
Roughtail catshark	Galeus arae		check			check	
Roughtail stingray	Bathytoshia centroura		check			check	
Round sardinella	Sardinella aurita		check			check	
Round scad	Decapterus punctatus		check			check	
Roundel skate	Rostroraja texana		check			check	
Roundscale spearfish	Tetrapturus georgii		check			check	
Royal gramma	Gramma loreto		check			check	
Royal peacock bass	Cichla intermedia			check	check		
Russetfin topminnow	Fundulus escambiae		check		check		
Saddle squirrelfish	Sargocentron poco		check			check	
Saddleback darter	Percina vigil		check		check		
Saddled blenny	Malacoctenus triangulatus		check			check	
Saddled moray eel	Gymnothorax conspersus		check			check	
Sailfin flyingfish	Parexocoetus brachypterus		check			check	
Sailfin molly	Poecilia latipinna		check		check		
Sailfin shiner	Pteronotropis hypselopterus		check		check		
Sailor's choice grunt	Haemulon parra		check			check	
Salvin's cichlid	Trichromis salvini			check	check		
Sandbar shark	Carcharhinus plumbeus		check			check	
Sand drum	Umbrina coroides		check			check	
Sand perch	Parapercis hexophtalma		check			check	
Sand seatrout	Cynoscion arenarius		check			check	
Sand stargazer	Dactyloscopus tridigitatus		check			check	
Sand tiger shark	Carcharias taurus		check			check	
Sand tilefish	Malacanthus plumieri		check			check	
Sand whiff	Citharichthys arenaceus		check			check	
Sargassum fish	Histrio histrio		check			check	
Sargassum triggerfish	Xanthichthys ringens		check			check	
Saucereye porgy	Calamus calamus		check			check	
Scaled sardine	Harengula jaguana		check			check	
Scalloped hammerhead	Sphyrna lewini		check			check	
Scamp grouper	Mycteroperca phenax		check			check	
Schoolmaster snapper	Lutjanus apodus		check			check	
Scleronema	Scleronema angustirostre			check	check	check	
Scrawled cowfish	Acanthostracion quadricornis		check			check	
Scrawled filefish	Aluterus scriptus		check			check	
Seagrass eel	Chilorhinus suensonii		check			check	
Seaweed blenny	Parablennius marmoreus		check			check	
Sea lamprey	Petromyzon marinus			check	check	check	
Seminole killifish	Fundulus seminolis		check		check		
Sergeant major	Abudefduf saxatilis		check			check	
Serra Spanish mackerel	Scomberomorus brasiliensis		check			check	
Shadow bass	Ambloplites ariommus		check		check		
Sharknose goby	Elacatinus evelynae		check			check	
Sharktooth moray eel	Gymnothorax maderensis		check			check	
Sharpfin chubsucker	Erimyzon tenuis		check		check		
Sharpnose sevengill shark	Heptranchias perlo		check			check	
Sharptail mola	Masturus lanceolatus		check			check	
Sharptail snake-eel	Myrichthys breviceps		check			check	
Sheepshead	Archosargus probatocephalus		check			check	
Sheepshead minnow	Cyprinodon variegatus variegatus		check		check	check	
Sheepshead porgy	Calamus penna		check			check	
Shoal bass	Micropterus cataractae		check		check		
Short beard codling	Laemonema barbatulum		check			check	
Shortbill spearfish	Tetrapturus angustirostris		check			check	
Shortfin mako shark	Isurus oxyrinchus		check			check	
Shortfin scorpionfish	Scorpaena brachyptera		check			check	
Shortjaw lizardfish	Saurida normani		check			check	
Shortnose gar	Lepisosteus platostomus		check		check		
Shortnose sturgeon	Acipenser brevirostrum		check		check	check	
Shorttail snake eel	Callechelys guineensis		check			check	
shovelbill shark	Sphyrna alleni		check			check	
Shrimp eel	Ophichthus gomesii		check			check	
Shy hamlet	Hypoplectrus guttavarius		check			check	
Siamese fighting fish	Betta splendens			check	check		
Silk snapper	Lutjanus vivanus		check			check	
Silky shark	Carcharhinus falciformis		check			check	
Silver arowana	Osteoglossum bicirrhosum			check	check		
Silver carp	Hypophthalmichthys molitrix			check	check		
Silver mullet	Mugil curema		check			check	
Silvertip shark	Carcharhinus albimarginatus		check			check	
Singlespot frogfish	Fowlerichthys radiosus		check			check	
Skipjack shad	Alosa chrysochloris		check		check	check	
Skipjack tuna	Katsuwonus pelamis		check			check	
Slantbrow batfish	Ogcocephalus declivirostris		check			check	
Slantlip eel	Caralophia		check			check	
Slender seahorse	Hippocampus reidi		check			check	
Slender sunfish	Ranzania laevis		check			check	
Slippery dick	Halichoeres bivittatus		check			check	
Smallfin catshark	Apristurus parvipinnis		check			check	
Smallscale lizardfish	Saurida caribbaea		check			check	
Small-scaled pacu	Piaractus mesopotamicus			check	check		
Smalltail shark	Carcharhinus porosus		check			check	
Smalltooth sawfish	Pristis pectinata		check			check	
Smooth butterfly ray	Gymnura micrura		check			check	
Smooth dogfish	Mustelus canis		check			check	
Smooth hammerhead	Sphyrna zygaena		check			check	
Smooth-head scorpionfish	Scorpaena calcarata		check			check	
Smoothlip stargazer	Leurochilus acon		check			check	
Smooth puffer	Lagocephalus laevigatus		check			check	
Smooth trunkfish	Lactophrys triqueter		check			check	
Snail bullhead	Ameiurus brunneus		check		check		
Snake mackerel	Gempylus serpens		check			check	
Snook	Centropomus undecimalis		check			check	
Snowy grouper	Hyporthodus niveatus		check			check	
Sooty eel	Bascanichthys bascanium		check			check	
Southern bluefin tuna	Thunnus maccoyii		check			check	
Southern brook lamprey	Ichthyomyzon gagei		check		check		
Southern eagle ray	Myliobatis goodei		check			check	
Southern kingfish	Menticirrhus americanus		check			check	
Southern ladyfish	Elops smithi		check			check	
Southern logperch	Percina austroperca		check		check		
Southern platyfish	Xiphophorus maculatus			check	check		
Southern puffer	Sphoeroides nephelus		check			check	
Southern sennet	Sphyraena picudilla		check			check	
Southern stargazer	Astroscopus y-graecum		check			check	
Southern stingray	Hypanus americanus		check		check	check	
Spaghetti eel	Moringua edwardsi		check			check	
Spanish flag	Gonioplectrus hispanus		check			check	
Spanish hogfish	Bodianus rufus		check			check	
Speckled darter	Etheostoma stigmaeum		check		check		
Speckled hind	Epinephelus (or Hyporthodus) drummondhayi		check			check	Also known as calico grouper, kitty mitchell, or strawberry grouper
Speckled madtom	Noturus leptacanthus		check		check		
Speckled peacock bass	Cichla temensis			check	check		
Speckled seatrout	Cynoscion nebulosus		check			check	
Speckled worm eel	Myrophis punctatus		check			check	
Spined pygmy shark	Squaliolus laticaudus		check			check	
Spinner shark	Carcharhinus brevipinna		check			check	
Spiny box puffer	Chilomycterus antillarum		check			check	
Spiny butterfly ray	Gymnura altavela		check			check	
Spinyhead blenny	Acanthemblemaria spinosa		check			check	
Splendid toadfish	Sanopus splendidus		check			check	
Spot	Leiostomus xanthurus		check			check	
Spotcheek blenny	Brockius nigricinctus		check			check	
Spotfin burrfish	Chilomycterus reticulatus		check			check	
Spotfin goby	Oxyurichthys stigmalophius		check			check	
Spotfin hogfish	Bodianus pulchellus		check			check	
Spot-fin porcupinefish	Diodon hystrix		check			check	
Spottail pinfish	Diplodus holbrookii		check			check	
Spotted bass	Micropterus punctulatus		check		check		
Spotted batfish	Ogcocephalus cubifrons		check			check	
Spotted bullhead	Ameiurus serracanthus		check		check		
Spotted drum	Equetus punctatus		check			check	
Spotted eagle ray	Aetobatus narinari		check			check	
Spotted gar	Lepisopsteus oculatus		check		check		
Spotted goatfish	Pseudupeneus maculatus		check			check	
Spotted moray	Gymnothorax moringa		check			check	
California scorpionfish	Scorpaena guttata			check		check	
Spotted scorpionfish	Scorpaena plumieri		check			check	
Spotted severum	Heros notatus			check	check		
Spotted sucker	Minytrema melanops		check		check		
Spotted sunfish	Lepomis punctatus		check		check		
Spotted tilapia	Pelmatolapia mariae			check	check	check	
Spotted trunkfish	Lactophrys bicaudalis		check			check	
Starhead topminnow	Fundulus dispar		check		check		
Stoplight parrotfish	Sparisoma viride		check			check	
Streamer searobin	Bellator egretta		check			check	
Striated argentine	Argentina striata		check			check	
Striated frogfish	Antennarius striatus		check			check	
String eel	Gordiichthys leibyi		check			check	
Striped bass	Morone saxatilis		check		check	check	
Striped blenny	Chasmodes bosquianus		check			check	
Striped burrfish	Chilomycterus antillarum		check			check	
Striped cusk-eel	Ophidion marginatum		check			check	
Striped killifish	Fundulus majalis		check		check	check	
Striped marlin	Kajikia audax		check			check	
Striped mullet	Mugil cephalus		check			check	
Striped parrotfish	Scarus iseri		check			check	
Striped searobin	Prionotus evolans		check			check	
Striped snakehead	Channa striata			check	check		
Stonefish	Ogcocephalus corniger		check			check	
Sturddlefish	Polyodon spathula × Acipenser gueldenstaedtii			check	check	check	
Suckermouth catfish	Hypostomus plecostomus			check	check		
Summer flounder	Paralichthys dentatus		check			check	
Surf eel	Ichthyapus ophioneus		check			check	
Suwannee bass	Micropterus notius		check		check		
Swamp darter	Etheostoma fusiforme		check		check	check	
Swordfish	Xiphias gladius		check			check	
Swordspine snook	Centropomus ensiferus		check		check	check	
Tadpole madtom	Noturus gyrinus		check		check		
Taillight shiner	Notropis maculatus		check		check		
Tamasaba	Sabao			check	check		
Tambaqui	Colossoma macropomum			check	check		
Tamuatá	Hoplosternum littorale			check	check		
Tarpon snook	Centropomus pectinatus		check			check	
Tessellated blenny	Hypsoblennius invemar		check			check	
Tessellated darter	Etheostoma olmstedi		check		check		
Texas cichlid	Herichthys cyanoguttatus			check	check		
Threadfin shad	Dorosoma petenense		check		check		
Threadnose bass	Choranthias tenuis		check			check	
Three-lined basslet	Lipogramma trilineata		check			check	
Three spot cichlid	Amphilophus trimaculatum			check	check		
Tiger grouper	Mycteroperca tigris		check			check	
Tiger shark	Galeocerdo cuvier		check			check	
Tiger shovelnose catfish	Pseudoplatystoma			check	check		
Tiger sorubim	Pseudoplatystoma tigrinum			check	check		
Tobaccofish	Serranus tabacarius		check			check	
Tomtate grunt	Haemulon aurolineatum		check			check	
Trimac cichlid	Amphilophus trimaculatum or Cichlasoma trimaculatum			check	check		
Tropical gar	Atractosteus tropicus			check	check		
Tropical two-wing flyingfish	Exocoetus volitans		check			check	
Tucanare peacock bass	Cichla monoculus			check	check		
Tusked goby	Risor ruber		check			check	
Twospot cardinalfish	Apogon pseudomaculatus		check			check	
Variatus platy	Xiphophorus variatus			check	check		
Vermiculated sailfin catfish	Pterygoplichthys disjunctivus			check	check		
Vermilion snapper	Rhomboplites aurorubens		check			check	
Violet goby	Gobioides broussonnetii		check			check	
Wahoo	Acanthocybium solandri		check			check	
Walking catfish	Clarias batrachus			check	check		
Walleye	Sander vitreus			check	check		
Wami tilapia	Oreochromis urolepis hornorum			check	check		
Warmouth	Lepomis gulosus		check		check		
Warsaw grouper	Hyporthodus nigritus		check			check	
Weakfish	Cynoscion regalis		check			check	
Weed shiner	Alburnops texanus		check		check		
Wels catfish	Silurus glanis			check	check		
West Atlantic trumpetfish	Aulostomus maculatus		check			check	
Western Atlantic finless eel	Apterichtus kendalli		check			check	
Western Atlantic seabream	Archosargus rhomboidalis		check			check	
Whale shark	Rhincodon typus		check			check	
White anglerfish	Lophiodes beroe		check			check	
White bass	Morone chrysops			check	check		
White catfish	Ictalurus catus		check		check		
White crappie	Pomoxis annularis			check	check		
Whitefin sharksucker	Echeneis neucratoides		check			check	
White grunt	Haemulon plumierii		check			check	
White marlin	Kajikia albida		check			check	
White mullet	Mugil curema		check			check	
White-nose pipefish	Cosmocampus albirostris		check			check	
White perch	Morone americana			check	check		
White sturgeon	Acipenser transmontanus			check	check	check	
Whitespot moray	Muraena pavonina		check			check	
Whitespotted filefish	Cantherhines macrocerus		check			check	
Whitespotted surgeonfish	Acanthurus guttatus			check		check	
Windowpane flounder	Scophthalmus aquosus		check			check	
Wolf cichlid	Parachromis dovii			check	check		
Wolf fish	Hoplias malabaricus			check	check		
Wrasse blenny	Hemiemblemaria simulus		check			check	
Yellow bullhead	Ameiurus natalis		check		check		
Yellow garden eel	Heteroconger luteolus		check			check	
Yellow goatfish	Mulloidichthys martinicus		check			check	
Yellow jack	Carangoides bartholomaei		check			check	
Yellow perch	Perca flavescens		check		check		
Yellow stingray	Urobatis jamaicensis		check			check	
Yellow tang	Zebrasoma flavescens			check		check	
Yellowcheek wrasse	Halichoeres cyanocephalus		check			check	
Yellowedge grouper	Hyporthodus flavolimbatus		check			check	
Yellowfin goby	Acanthogobius flavimanus			check		check	
Yellowfin grouper	Mycteroperca venenosa		check			check	
Yellowfin menhaden	Brevoortia smithi		check			check	
Yellowfin mojarra	Gerres cinereus		check			check	
Yellowfin tuna	Thunnus albacares		check			check	
Yellowhead jawfish	Opistognathus aurifrons		check			check	
Yellowhead wrasse	Halichoeres garnoti		check			check	
Yellowline goby	Elacatinus horsti		check			check	
Yellowmouth grouper	Mycteroperca interstitialis		check			check	
Yellowtail damselfish	Microspathodon chrysurus		check			check	
Yellowtail parrotfish	Sparisoma rubripinne		check			check	
Yellowtail reef fish	Chromis enchrysura		check			check	
Yellowtail snapper	Ocyurus chrysurus		check			check	
Zabaleta anchovy	Anchovia clupeoides		check			check	
Zebrafish	Danio rerio			check	check		
Zebra tilapia	Heterotilapia buttikoferi			check	check		
Zebratail blenny	Hypleurochilus caudovittatus		check			check	

== See also ==
- Asian carp in North America
- List of amphibians of Florida
- List of birds of Florida
- List of birds of Biscayne National Park
- List of birds of Everglades National Park
- List of birds of Dry Tortugas National Park
- List of mammals of Florida
- List of reptiles of Florida
- List of snakes of Florida
- List of invasive marine fish in Florida
- List of invasive species in Florida
- List of invasive species in the Everglades
- List of invasive plant species in Florida
- Invasive species in the United States
- List of invasive species in North America
- List of invasive species in the Mid-Atlantic region of the United States
- Environmental issues in the United States
- List of genetic hybrids
- Tilapia as exotic species
- List of introduced species
- Lists of invasive species
- List of freshwater game fish
- List of freshwater aquarium fish species
- List of fish of Hawaii
- Invasive species
- 100 of the World's Worst Invasive Alien Species
- Burmese pythons in Florida
- Tropical fish
- Fauna of Florida
- List of least concern perciform fishes
- Cytonuclear discordance
- International Game Fish Association
- Florida Fish and Wildlife Conservation Commission
- Atlantic Shark Institute
