= USS Jallao =

Submarine of the United States

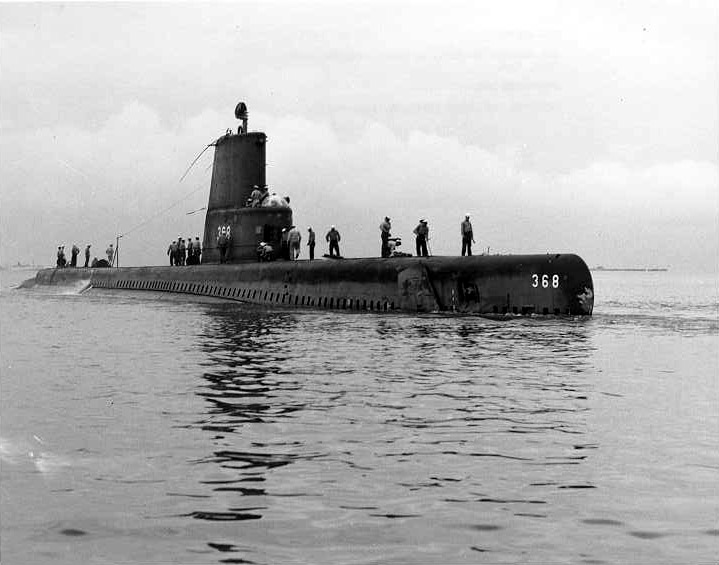
- USS Jallao (SS-368), after Guppy IIA conversion underway, mid 1950s.

History

United States
- Name: USS Jallao
- Namesake: Jallao
- Builder: Manitowoc Shipbuilding Company, Manitowoc, Wisconsin
- Laid down: 29 September 1943
- Launched: 12 March 1944
- Commissioned: 8 July 1944
- Decommissioned: 30 September 1946
- Recommissioned: 4 December 1953
- Decommissioned: 26 June 1974
- Stricken: 26 June 1974
- Identification: SS-368
- Fate: Transferred to Spain, 26 June 1974

Spain
- Name: Narciso Monturiol
- Acquired: 26 June 1974
- Decommissioned: 12 December 1984
- Identification: S-35
- Fate: Scuttled off Cartagena, Spain, 1985

General characteristics
- Class & type: Balao-class diesel-electric submarine
- Displacement: 1,526 tons (1,550 t) surfaced; 2,424 tons (2,463 t) submerged
- Length: 311 ft 9 in (95.02 m)
- Beam: 27 ft 3 in (8.31 m)
- Draft: 16 ft 10 in (5.13 m) maximum
- Propulsion: 4 × General Motors Model 16-278A V16 diesel engines driving electrical generators; 2 × 126-cell Sargo batteries; 4 × high-speed General Electric electric motors with reduction gears; 2 × propellers; 5,400 shp (4.0 MW) surfaced; 2,740 shp (2.0 MW) submerged
- Speed: 20.25 knots (38 km/h) surfaced; 8.75 knots (16 km/h) submerged
- Range: 11,000 nautical miles (20,000 km) surfaced at 10 knots (19 km/h)
- Endurance: 48 hours at 2 knots (3.7 km/h) submerged; 75 days on patrol
- Test depth: 400 ft (120 m)
- Complement: 10 officers, 70–71 enlisted
- Armament: 10 × 21-inch (533 mm) torpedo tubes; 6 forward, 4 aft; 24 torpedoes; 1 × 5-inch (127 mm) / 25 caliber deck gun; Bofors 40 mm and Oerlikon 20 mm cannon

General characteristics (Guppy IIA)
- Class & type: none
- Displacement: 1,848 tons (1,878 t) surfaced; 2,440 tons (2,479 t) submerged
- Length: 307 ft (93.6 m)
- Beam: 27 ft 4 in (8.3 m)
- Draft: 17 ft (5.2 m)
- Propulsion: Snorkel added; One diesel engine and generator removed; Batteries upgraded to Sargo II
- Speed: Surfaced: 17.0 knots (31.5 km/h) maximum; 13.5 knots (25.0 km/h) cruising; Submerged: 14.1 knots (26.1 km/h) for ½ hour; 8.0 knots (14.8 km/h) snorkeling; 3.0 knots (5.6 km/h) cruising
- Armament: 10 × 21 inch (533 mm) torpedo tubes; (six forward, four aft); all guns removed

USS Jallao (SS-368), a Balao-class submarine, was a ship of the United States Navy named for the jallao, a pearl-white haemulonid food fish of the Gulf of Mexico.

== Construction and commissioning ==
Jallao was launched by the Manitowoc Shipbuilding Company at Manitowoc, Wisconsin, on 12 March 1944, sponsored by Mrs. Oliver G. Kirk, and commissioned on 8 July 1944.

== Operational history ==
After spending most of July in training operations, Jallao departed Manitowoc 26 July for Chicago, where she was loaded into a floating dry dock for the long trip down the Mississippi to New Orleans. She subsequently departed New Orleans 6 August, and steamed through the Panama Canal to the Pacific and arrived at Pearl Harbor on 22 September.

=== First patrol, October – December 1944 ===
Following additional training the submarine sailed 9 October for her first war patrol, operating with Pintado and Atule in a coordinated attack group known as "Clarey's Crushers". At first the submarines proceeded toward Luzon Strait, but during the Battle of Leyte Gulf late in October, they were directed to take up scouting positions between the Philippines and Japan to cut off Japanese cripples struggling home after their devastating defeat at the Battle off Cape Engaño.

On the evening of 25 October Jallao picked up damaged light cruiser Tama on radar and moved to attack. She fired seven torpedoes; three hit the Japanese warship, sinking it. Future United States federal judge Jack B. Weinstein was in charge of the submarine's radar when the submarine located the cruiser.

After this notable success on her maiden patrol, Jallao continued her search until 28 November, returning to Majuro 10 December.

=== Second, third, and fourth patrols, January – September 1945 ===
Jallao sailed for the Yellow Sea for her second war patrol 6 January 1945. The decimated Japanese merchant marine offered few targets. However, she spotted a convoy on 5 March. During the attack, she had a close call when an enemy escort trying to ram her damaged her periscope. Two days later she sailed for Midway, arriving 26 March.

After repairs, the submarine departed Midway 20 April for her third war patrol and was assigned aircraft lifeguard duty off Marcus Island. Responding to reports of flyers in the water north of the island, on 9 May Jallao braved shore batteries to move in and pick up five men in a raft, delivering them safely to Saipan on 12 May. She then departed for the coast of Japan and more lifeguard duty as American heavy bombers stepped up their attacks on the home islands. She arrived at Pearl Harbor 13 June.

After advanced training in the Marianas, Jallao departed Guam 31 July to patrol the Sea of Japan. On this, her fourth and final patrol, the submarine sank the 6,000-ton freighter Timoko Maru on 11 August (19 survivors were found by Stickleback on 21 August). Four days later hostilities ended, and the ship sailed via Guam to San Francisco, where she arrived 28 September. She was decommissioned at Mare Island 30 September 1946, and entered the Pacific Reserve Fleet.

=== 1953–1956 ===
Jallao's home port was changed to New London in July 1953, for a GUPPY IIA conversion in which she was streamlined and equipped with snorkeling gear and new electric equipment. She was recommissioned on 4 December 1953. After shakedown in the San Diego area, the submarine departed 12 April for the East Coast, steaming via the Panama Canal to Norfolk, Virginia

Joining Submarine Squadron 6, Jallao operated out of Halifax, Nova Scotia during 1954, training with Canadian and American antisubmarine units. In January and February 1955, she took part in fleet exercises in the Caribbean, returning to Norfolk 4 March.

Jallao's home port was changed to New London in July 1955 and she got underway with British submarine HMS Alderney 7 August to take part in Joint Exercise "New Broom IV". Following this operation, Jallao was deployed to the 6th Fleet and departed for the Mediterranean 9 November 1955. In the months that followed, she helped train Italian Navy ships and took part in fleet exercises, beginning the long voyage home in mid-January 1956. The ship steamed through the Suez Canal, visited several countries of eastern and southern Africa, and crossed the South Atlantic to take part in exercises with Uruguayan and Brazilian destroyers. The veteran submarine returned to New London 16 April.

=== 1957–1967 ===
After having installed the latest in electronic gear, Jallao resumed operations in January 1957. Combined fleet exercises in the Caribbean occupied her through February; and, after coastal antisubmarine operations, she arrived Boston late in July for a short midshipman training cruise. September and October were spent in the North Atlantic on a NATO exercise, as the submarine helped strengthen the armed forces of the Atlantic Allies. She returned to New London 24 October 1957.

Jallao spent most of 1958 on training exercises off the Atlantic Coast, taking part in a combined antisubmarine exercise in the North Atlantic in September. 1959 was spent largely in equipment development work and training with the Submarine School at New London.

The ship got underway 20 January 1960 for exercises in the Caribbean, returning 19 February. The latter part of the year was spent in training out of Bermuda. From 9 January to 24 March 1961, the veteran submarine carried out special training operations off Scotland, and operated with Canadian ships off Halifax during that summer. The remainder of the year was spent in the New London area.

Jallao began 1962 with her second Mediterranean cruise, sailing 2 January and exercising with the vital 6th Fleet in the troubled area until 7 May. The last four months of the year were spent in extensive modernization and repairs at Philadelphia Naval Shipyard. Through 1963 and 1964, the boat took part in training cruises to the Caribbean, served in submarine school training, and participated in equipment evaluation work.

On 3 January 1965, she departed for a four-month 6th Fleet deployment. She returned 1 May for submarine warfare tactics and submarine school operations out of New London. Jallao operated along the Atlantic coast and in the Caribbean until 1974.

=== Narciso Monturiol (S-35) ===
On 26 June 1974, Jallao was decommissioned, struck from the US Naval Register, and transferred (sold) under the terms of the Security Assistance Program to Spain. The submarine was commissioned into the Spanish Navy as Narciso Monturiol (S-35), named after Narcís Monturiol.

Monturiol was decommissioned on 12 December 1984 and scuttled off Cartagena, Spain, in 1985.

== Awards ==
Jallao received four battle stars for her World War II service.

== See also ==
- List of submarines of the Spanish Navy
