= Brockius striatus =

Conservation status
- Least Concern (IUCN 3.1)

Scientific classification
- Kingdom: Animalia
- Phylum: Chordata
- Class: Actinopterygii
- Order: Blenniiformes
- Family: Labrisomidae
- Genus: Brockius
- Species: B. striatus

Binomial name
- Brockius striatus (C. L. Hubbs, 1953)

Synonyms
- Labrisomus striatus Clark L. Hubbs, 1953

Species of fish

Brockis striatus, the Green blenny, is a species of labrisomid blenny native to the Pacific coast of Mexico where it is found in shallow waters with a rocky substrate and substantial weed growth. This species can reach a length of 6 centimetres (2.4 in) TL.
