= Brockius albigenys =

Conservation status
- Least Concern (IUCN 3.1)

Scientific classification
- Kingdom: Animalia
- Phylum: Chordata
- Class: Actinopterygii
- Order: Blenniiformes
- Family: Labrisomidae
- Genus: Brockius
- Species: B. albigenys

Binomial name
- Brockius albigenys (Beebe & Tee-Van, 1928)

Synonyms
- Labrisomus albigenys Beebe & Tee-Van, 1928

Species of fish

Brockius albigenys, the Whitecheek blenny, is a species of labrisomid blenny native to reefs of the Caribbean Sea.
