= Brockius =

Scientific classification
- Kingdom: Animalia
- Phylum: Chordata
- Class: Actinopterygii
- Order: Blenniiformes
- Family: Labrisomidae
- Genus: Brockius; C. Hubbs, 1953

Type species
- Labrosomus striatus Clark L. Hubbs, 1953

Genus of fishes

Brockius is a genus of labrisomid blennies from the waters of the eastern Pacific and the western Atlantic where they are associated with reefs and seaweed-covered rocks.

== Species ==
The species in the genus are:

- Brockius albigenys (Beebe & Tee-Van, 1928) (White-cheek blenny)
- Brockius nigricinctus (Howell-Rivero), 1936 (Spotcheek blenny)
- Brockius striatus (C. L. Hubbs, 1953) (Green blenny)

== Taxonomy ==
The name Brockius was coined by Clark L. Hubbs as a subgenus of Labrisomus but has been raised to a genus in its own right.

== Etymology ==
The generic name honours the ichthyologist and herpetologist Vernon E. Brock (1912-1971) who collected the type of B. striatus.
