= Brockius nigricinctus =

Conservation status
- Least Concern (IUCN 3.1)

Scientific classification
- Kingdom: Animalia
- Phylum: Chordata
- Class: Actinopterygii
- Order: Blenniiformes
- Family: Labrisomidae
- Genus: Brockius
- Species: B. nigricinctus

Binomial name
- Brockius nigricinctus (Howell-Rivero, 1936)

Synonyms
- Labrisomus nigricinctus Howell-Rivero, 1936

Species of fish

Brockius nigricinctus, the spotcheek blenny, is a species of labrisomid blenny native to the western Atlantic Ocean from south Florida to Brazil. This species inhabits coral reefs or rocky areas from very shallow waters to a depth of 10 metres (33 ft). It can reach a length of 8 centimetres (3.1 in) TL. This species can also be found in the aquarium trade.
