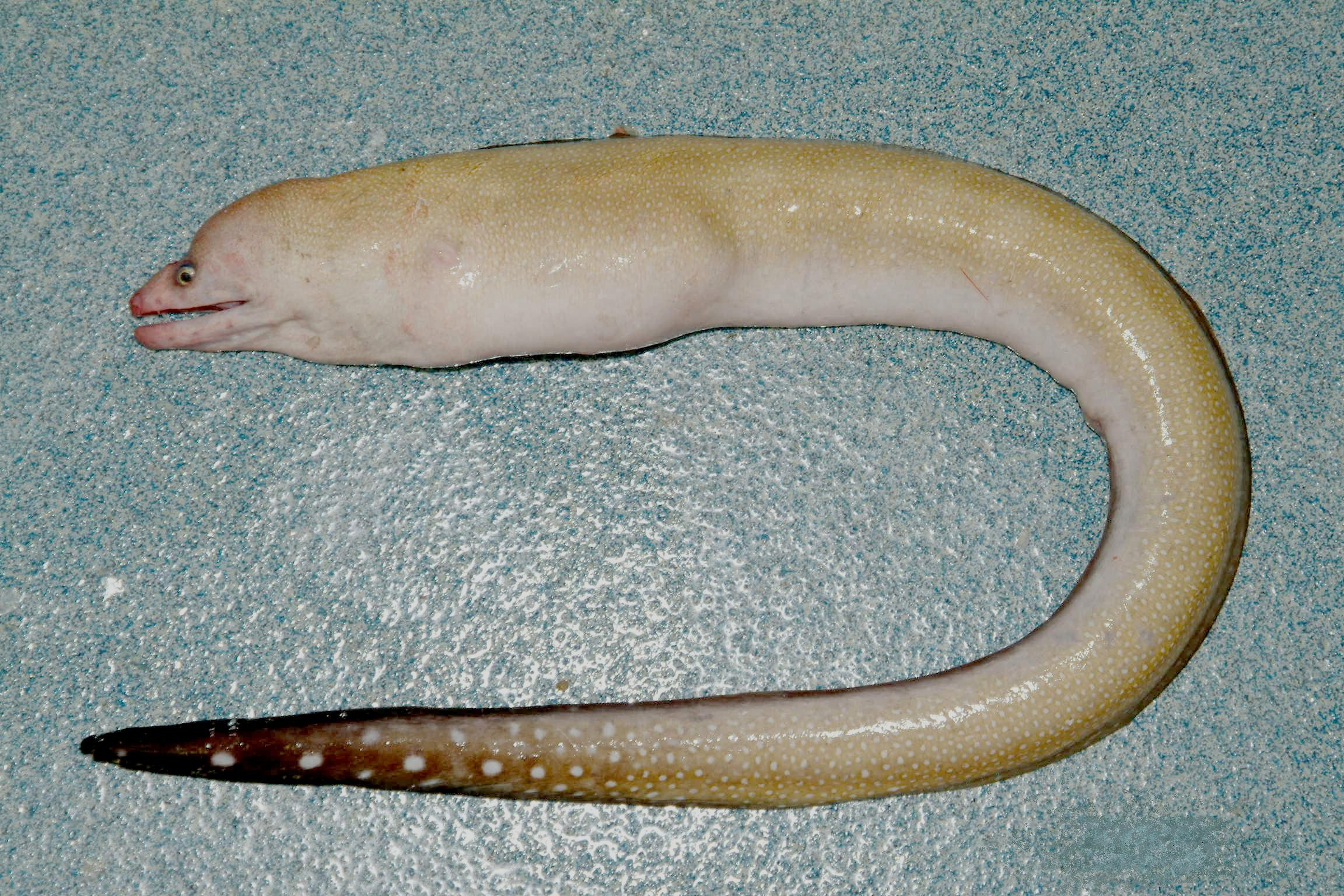

Conservation status
- Least Concern (IUCN 3.1)

Scientific classification
- Kingdom: Animalia
- Phylum: Chordata
- Class: Actinopterygii
- Order: Anguilliformes
- Family: Muraenidae
- Genus: Gymnothorax
- Species: G. kolpos

Binomial name
- Gymnothorax kolpos J. E. Böhlke & E. B. Böhlke, 1980

= Blacktail moray eel =

Species of fish

The blacktail moray eel (Gymnothorax kolpos) is a moray eel found in the western Atlantic Ocean. It was first named by Eugenia B. Böhlke and James E. Böhlke in 1980.
