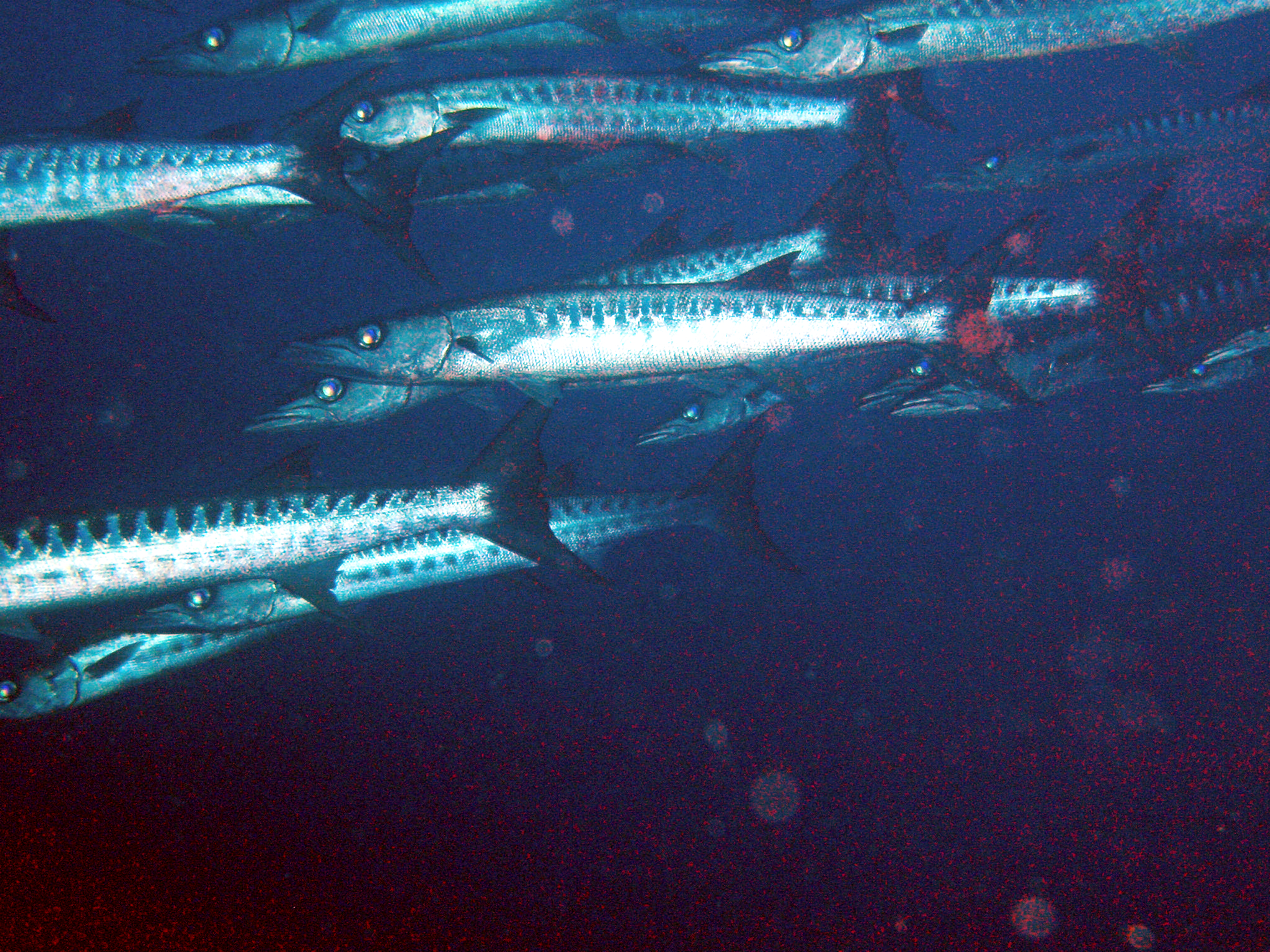

Scientific classification
- Kingdom: Animalia
- Phylum: Chordata
- Class: Actinopterygii
- Division: Teleostei
- Order: Carangiformes
- Suborder: Centropomoidei
- Family: Sphyraenidae
- Genus: Sphyraena
- Species: S. putnamae

Binomial name
- Sphyraena putnamae Jordan and Seale, 1905

= Sphyraena putnamae =

Species of barracuda

Sphyraena putnamae, the sawtooth, chevron or military barracuda, is a species of barracuda found in all tropical seas and temperate waters of major oceans with the exception of the Eastern Pacific. It is found near shores in bays, turbid lagoons, and some reefs. It can be distinguished by the many (about 15) dark chevron-shaped markings along its side, and its forked caudal fin. It spends its time in the shallow part of the sea off the coast, and stays closer to the surface levels of the open ocean. It can live up to 14 years, reaching lengths of six feet (1.8 m) long and weighing over 100 pounds (45 kg).

== Modern classification ==
There is not currently any supported phylogenetic hypothesis including all twenty-nine species in Sphyraena. However, there is phylogenetic data and a well-supported phylogeny that includes twenty of these species, including Sphyraena putnamae. By analyzing three of the most frequently found nuclear and mitochondrial genes in Sphyraena, as well as using Bayesian Evolutionary Analysis Sampling Trees, researchers found evidence supporting monophyly of Sphyraena. In the produced phylogeny, Sphyraena putnamae falls into the first of three clades, being most closely related to the species Sphyraena jello. The monophyly suggested in this research has come into question once again more recently, with questions concerning the identification differences between Sphyraena putnamae and Sphyraena qenie, which was not included in the twenty species. Both species share features such as an absence of gill rakers, elongated rays on second dorsal and anal fins, entirely blackish caudal fins, and a lack of spines on their first gill-arch platelets. However, these two species have been discerned from one another via the number of dark lateral bands on their bodies, absence of lobes on the caudal fin centra margin, quantity of scale rows, and other recently found morphometrics including the lengths of upper-jaw, pre-dorsal fin, pre-pelvic fin, as well as several more measurements.

== Ecology ==
Sphyraena putnamae is active at night, but also forms large schools during the day. Adults of the species are solitary, while juveniles are gregarious and form schools.

=== Prey ===
The diet of the sawtooth barracuda consists primarily of ray-finned fish of the families Carangidae, Engraulidae (Anchovies), and Scombridae, and, to a far lesser extent, some molluscs and crustaceans. There is a correlation between the size of the fish and its diet- smaller fish eat more crustaceans, medium-sized fish feed on molluscs and ray-finned fish, while the largest specimens feed exclusively on those fish.

=== Reproduction and breeding ===
Young barracuda drift inshore in spring, and move to deeper water in the late fall. Spawning season is from April until October off southern Florida. Most Males mature at two years of age, and most females mature at three years of age. In Sphyraena putnamae, the sex ratio observed of females:males was 1.49:1 respectively. At the age of sexual maturity, fork length, which is the measurement from the tip of the snout to the fork of the tail, was measured to be 41.33 cm for females and 40.68 cm for males. This species exhibits high fecundity, and hence a high reproductive potential, and spawn throughout the entire year. There are two main peaks of reproduction in the months of April–May being the first peak and the second peak in November through January. The smallest mature females were recorded to be 24.9 cm and the smallest mature males to be 24.5 cm. In this species, males are heavier than females. During juvenile life, a rapid increase in length results in individuals being lighter for a given length. Sphyraena putnamae have been observed to have a year-round reproduction with peaks, which is common for most tropical fish stock to reduce the negative impact of environmental variation on their reproductive success. The main difference between Sphyraena putnamae and other species in the Sphyraena family is that Sphyraena putnamae have two annual spawning peaks, but most of the other species have a single prolonged reproductive peak. This bimodal peak appears to be driven by the seasonal changes in temperature and photoperiod in their environment.

=== Diet ===
Sphyraena putnamae consume diverse prey items, which can be grouped into three main categories: teleosts, molluscs, and crustaceans. Teleosts are the preferred food source and dominant food component for Sphyraena putnamae, while mollusks and crustaceans constitute the secondary and accessory food items respectively. The main constituents of their teleost diet included caragids, scombrids, engraulids, leiognathids, and synodontids. Sphyraena putnamae is mostly a nocturnal predator that individually searches for prey at night, and moves in groups throughout the day. Sphyraena putnamae also have a preference for near-shore waters, turbid lagoons, bays, and reefs. In the dominant food category, it is composed mainly of the species Decapterus Russelli, Megalaspis Cordyla, and Rastrelliger Kanagurta. This group of teleosts constitutes over 85% of the diet of Sphyraena putnamae. Based on the small percentage of crustaceans and molluscs in their diet, but the large number of teleosts, we can infer that the species perform a vertical movement to consume a large variety of prey items.

=== Parasites ===
A species of myxozoa (Kudoa barracudai) infecting a S. putnamae's muscles was described from the Red Sea in 2016. They are also parasitized by Bucephalidae flatworm species.

=== Distribution and habitat ===
Sphyraena putnamae are most frequently observed in the Indo-Pacific region, consisting of the Indian Ocean and the western Pacific Ocean. The heaviest concentrations of the species have been found off the southeastern coast of Africa, north coast of Australia, and in the waters between east and southeast Asia. The center of diversity is likely to be found in the eastern Indian Ocean or western Pacific regions, as this is where the species was first discovered and has maintained its highest population densities. On a few occasions, Sphyraena putnamae has been sighted in other locations, such as the coast of Florida and in various locations near Central America. Sphyraena putnamae share the same habitats as many other species of Sphyraena. They normally inhabit reefs, bays, and lagoons off the coast. They do not typically live in deeper waters, as they maintain shallow depths of three to twenty meters. Sphyraena putnamae are active at night, and they usually travel in schools during the daytime.

== Taxonomy ==
Sphyraena putnamae is a species in the genus Sphyraena, the only genus from the family Sphyraenidae. This genus is composed of twenty-nine different species of barracuda, with many only sharing slight differences. This has resulted in confusion on many occasions for identifying and describing the different species under Sphyraena.

== History ==
=== Discovery and naming ===
Sphyraena putnamae was identified first from a collection of fishes in Hong Kong in 1905 by David Jordan and Alvin Seale. Two years later, the species was published in the Proceedings of the Davenport Academy of Natural Sciences, Vol. 10. The etymology of the species borrows from Greek and Latin roots for Sphyraena, translating to a kind of fish or a pike-like fish, respectively.

The fish is named in honor of Mary Louisa Duncan Putnam (1832–1903), the "honored patron" of the Davenport Academy of Sciences.

== Gallery ==
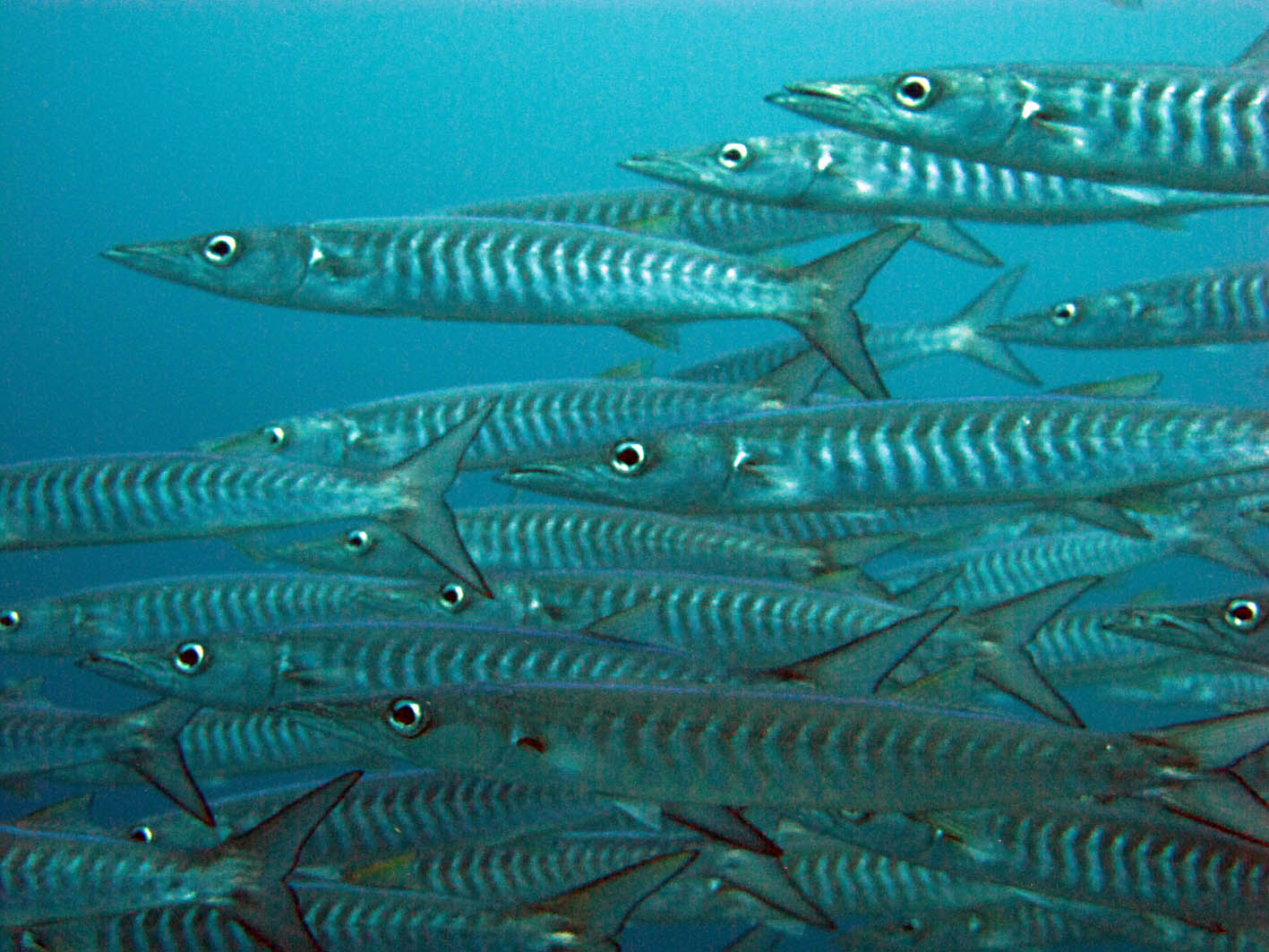
Sphyraena putnamae in Raja Ampat Papua, 2011

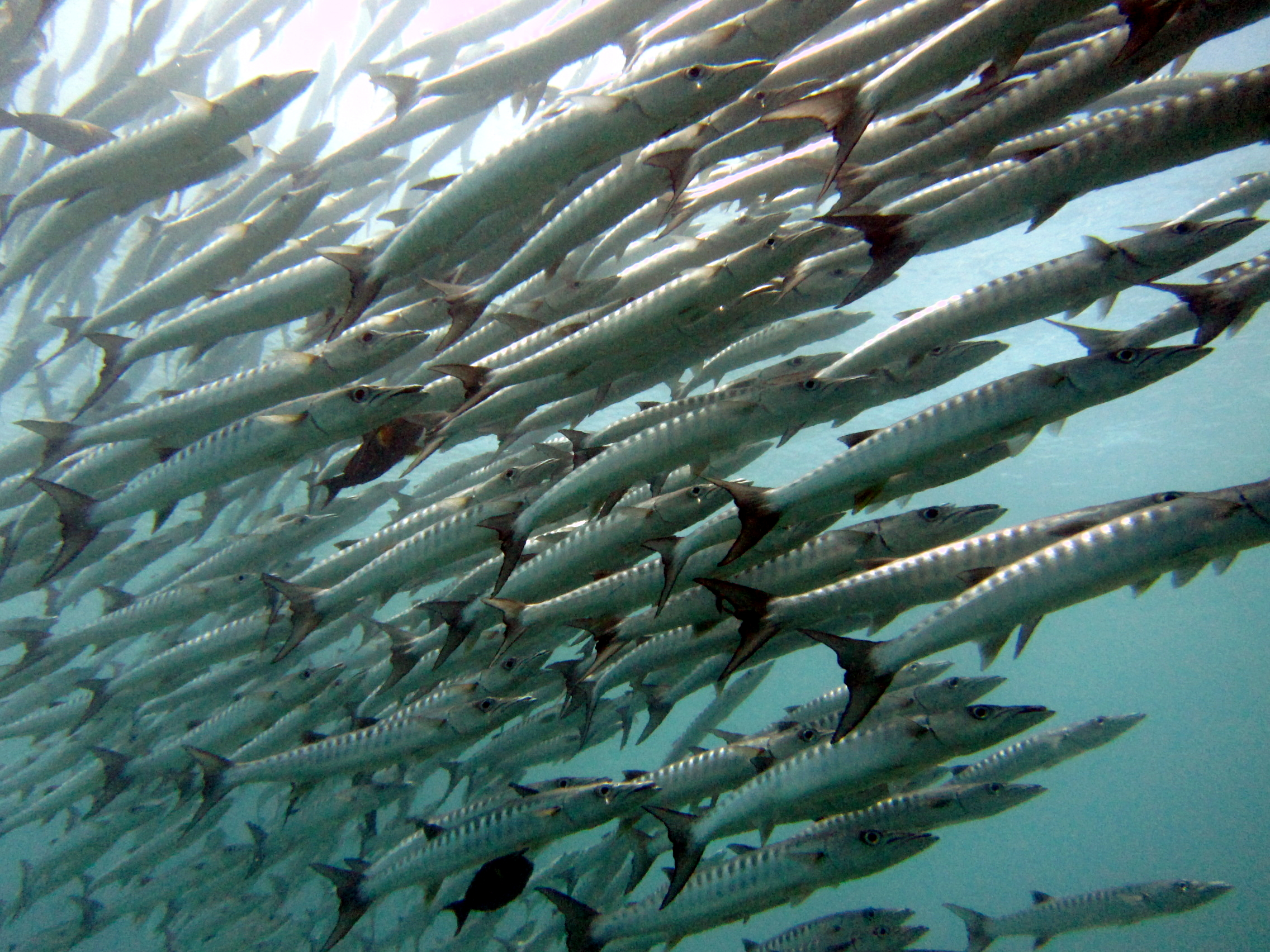
School of Sphyraena putnamae near Pom Pom Island Semporna, Sabah, 2012

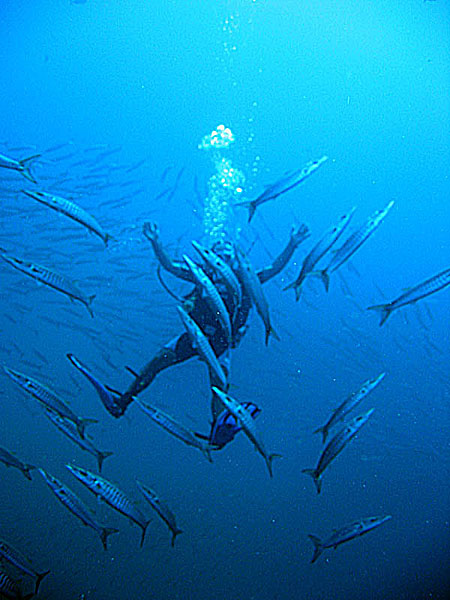
Diver in school of barracudas at Koh Tao Thailand 2004

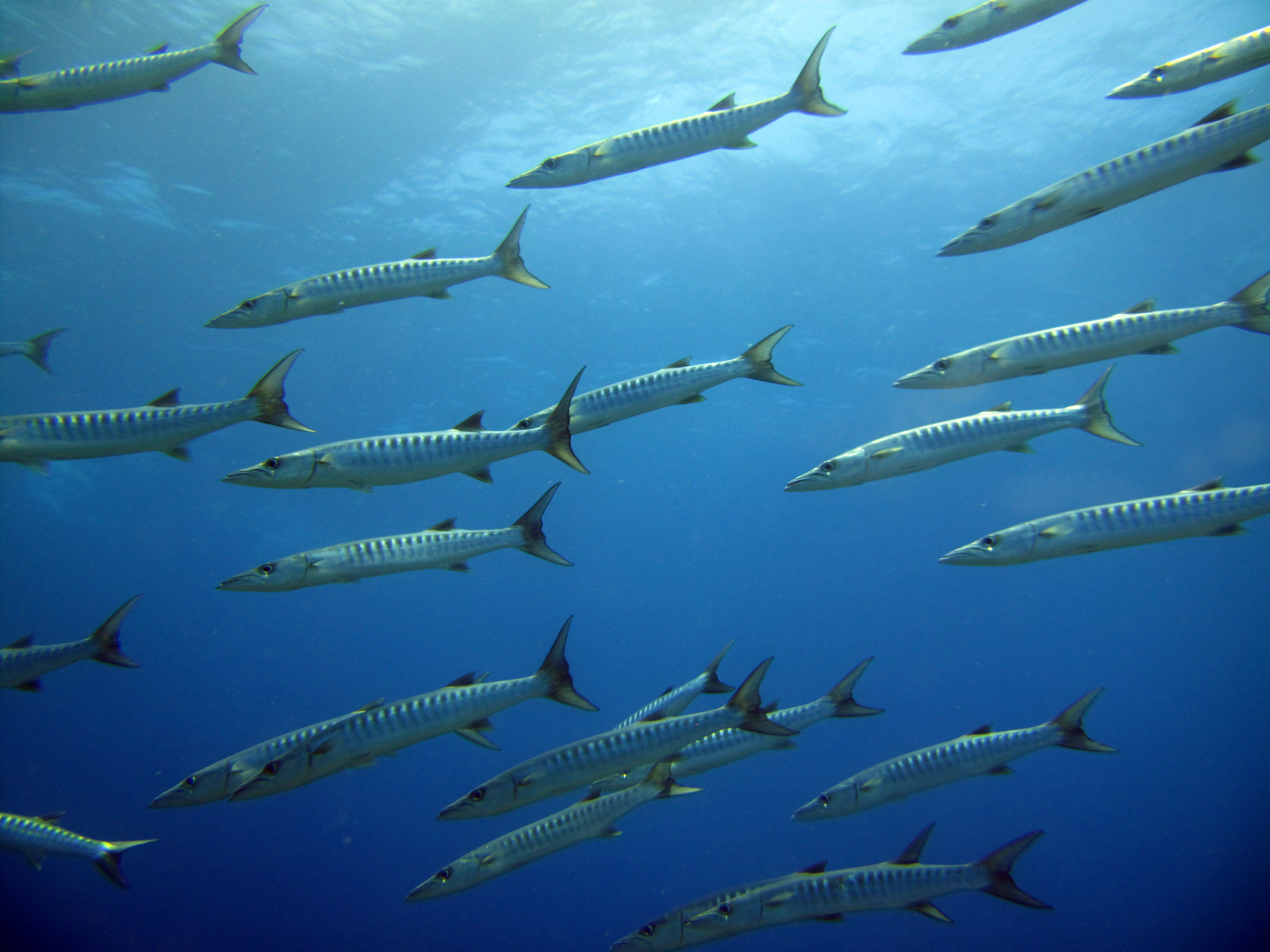
Sphyraena putnamae in Phoenix Islands Kiribati, 2009

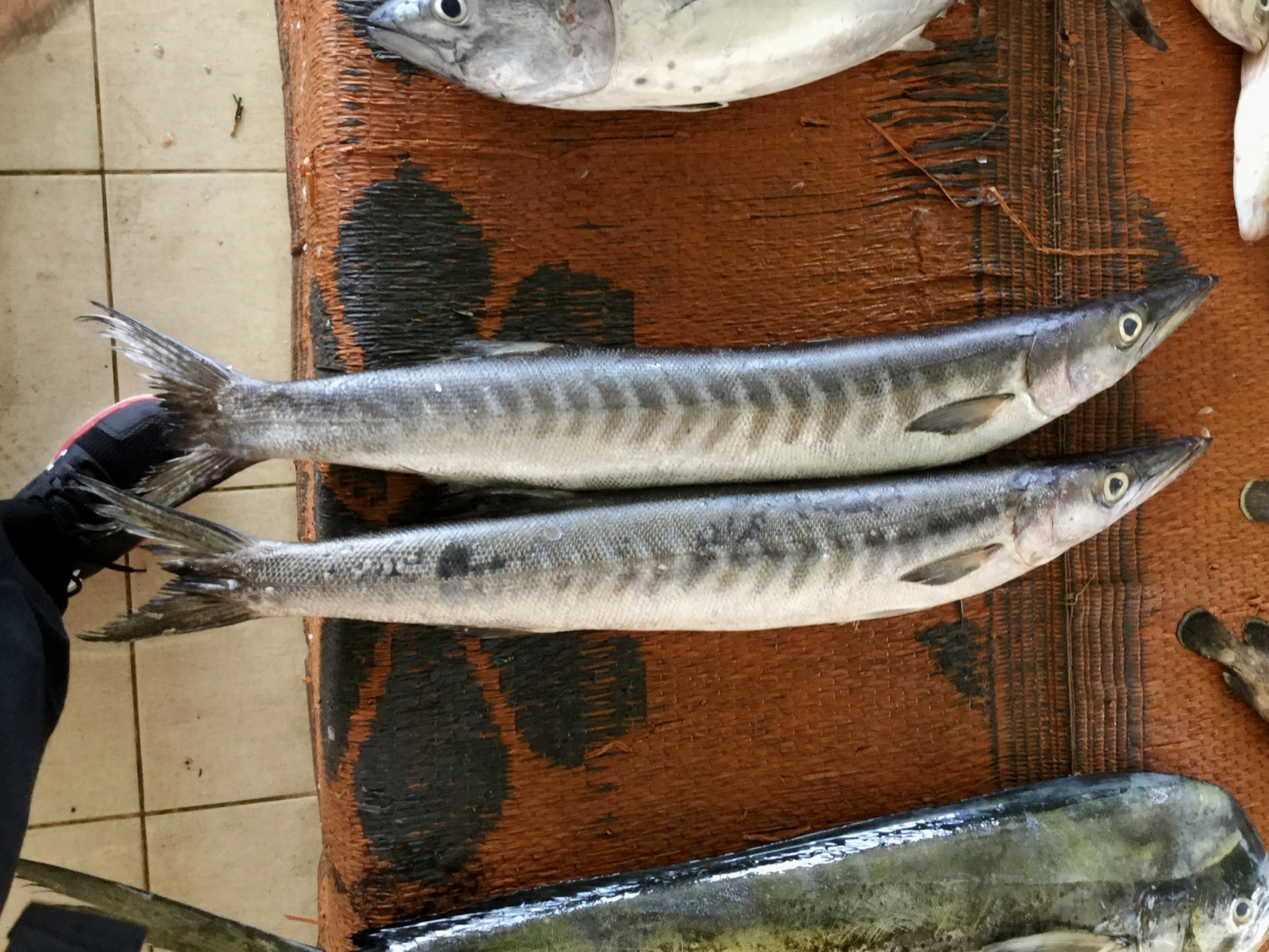
Sphyraena putnamae at As Sultan Qaboos Port Muscat, 2017

== Footnotes ==
=== References ===
1. De Sylva, Donald (1973). "Barracudas (Pisces: Sphyreendiae) of the Indian Ocean and Adjacent Seas". J Mar Biol Assoc India.
2. Froese, R (2019). "Sphyraena Putnamae Summary Page". Fishbase.
3. "Sphyraena putnamae Jordan & Seale, 1905". www.gbif.org.
4. "Military Barracuda (Sphyraena putnamae)". iNaturalist.
5. "Chevron barracuda - Encyclopedia of Life". eol.org.
6. Nations, Food and Agriculture Organization of the United; Irrigation, Ministry of Agriculture, Livestock and (2019-12-12). Field identification guide to the living resources of Myanmar. Food & Agriculture Org. ISBN 978-92-5-132005-1.
7. Jawad, Laith A. (2017-09-21). Dangerous Fishes of the Eastern and Southern Arabian Peninsula. Springer. ISBN 978-3-319-57926-9.
8. "Sphyraena putnamae". fishesofaustralia.net.au.
9. "Sphyraena putnamae". fishesofaustralia.net.au.
10. Sommer, C (1995). "Sphyraenidae. Barracudas, picudas". Fischer W, Krupp F. Schnider W, Sommer C, Carpenter KE, Niem V.
11. Santini, F.; Carnevale, G.; Sorenson, L. (2014-10-08). "First timetree of Sphyraenidae (Percomorpha) reveals a Middle Eocene crown age and an Oligo–Miocene radiation of barracudas". Italian Journal of Zoology. 82 (1): 133–142. doi:10.1080/11250003.2014.962630. ISSN 1125-0003.
12. Morishita, Satoshi; Miki, Ryohei; Wada, Hidetoshi; Itou, Masahide; Motomura, Hiroyuki (2020-07-01). "Morphological comparisons of Sphyraena qenie with S. putnamae, with a revised key to Indo-Pacific species of Sphyraena lacking gill rakers (Sphyraenidae)". Ichthyological Research. 67 (3): 456–463. Bibcode:2020IchtR..67..456M. doi:10.1007/s10228-020-00738-6. ISSN 1616-3915.
13. Rajesh, K. M.; Rohit, Prathibha; Viswambharan, Divya; Abdussamad, E. M.; Rajesh, Mridula (2021-09-01). "Feeding behaviour of the sawtooth barracuda, Sphyraena putnamae (Jordan and Seale, 1905) along the southeastern Arabian Sea, India". Regional Studies in Marine Science. 47 101974. Bibcode:2021RSMS...4701974R. doi:10.1016/j.rsma.2021.101974. ISSN 2352-4855.
14. Ghosh, Shubhadeep; Satishkumar, Mamidi; Manas, Hoshalli Munivenkatappa; Rohit, Prathibha; Abdussamad, Eruppakkottil Median; Gopalakrishnan, Achamveetil (2021). "Reproductive biology of the sawtooth barracuda, Sphyraena putnamae, in the Bay of Bengal, India". Environmental Biology of Fishes. 104 (11): 1421–1432. Bibcode:2021EnvBF.104.1421G. doi:10.1007/s10641-021-01167-8. ISSN 0378-1909.
15. Kadison, Elizabeth; D'Alessandro, Evan K.; Davis, Gideon O.; Hood, Peter B. (2010-10-01). "Age, Growth, and Reproductive Patterns of the Great Barracuda, Sphyraena Barracuda, from the Florida Keys". Bulletin of Marine Science. 86 (4): 773–784. Bibcode:2010BuMS...86..773K. doi:10.5343/bms.2009.1070.
16. Abdel-Baki, Abdel-Azeem S.; Al-Quraishy, Saleh; Al Omar, Suliman Y.; Mansour, Lamjed (2016-05-01). "Ultrastructure and phylogeny of Kudoa barracudai sp. nov. infecting Sphyraena putnamae in the Red Sea". Parasitology Research. 115 (5): 1799–1805. doi:10.1007/s00436-016-4918-4. ISSN 1432-1955. PMID 26786834. S2CID 253971054.
17. Bray, Rodney A.; Justine, Jean-Lou (2011-06-01). "Bucephaline digeneans (Bucephalidae) in Sphyraena putnamae Jordan & Seale (Sphyraenidae) from the lagoon off New Caledonia". Systematic Parasitology. 79 (2): 123–138. doi:10.1007/s11230-011-9300-4. ISSN 1573-5192. PMID 21544711. S2CID 13235063.
18. Jawad, Laith A. (2018), "Erratum to: Dangerous Fishes of the Eastern and Southern Arabian Peninsula", Dangerous Fishes of the Eastern and Southern Arabian Peninsula, Cham: Springer International Publishing, pp. E1, doi:10.1007/978-3-319-57926-9_8, ISBN 978-3-319-57924-5
19. "Search". www.gbif.org.
20. "Fish Identification". fishbase.mnhn.fr.
21. Christopher Scharpf & Kenneth J. Lazara (22 September 2018). "Order CARANGIFORMES (part 1): Families LATIDAE, CENTROPOMIDAE, LACTARIIDAE, SPHYRAENIDAE, LEPTOBRAMIDAE, TOXOTIDAE, NEMATISTIIDAE, MENIDAE, XIPHIIDAE, ISTIOPHORIDAE, CORYPHAENIDAE, RACHYCENTRIDAE, ECHENEIDAE and CARANGIDAE". The ETYFish Project Fish Name Etymology Database. Christopher Scharpf and Kenneth J. Lazara.
22. Jordan, David Starr (1905). List of fishes collected at Hong Kong by Captain William Finch, with description of five new species. [publisher not identified]. OCLC 51368852.
