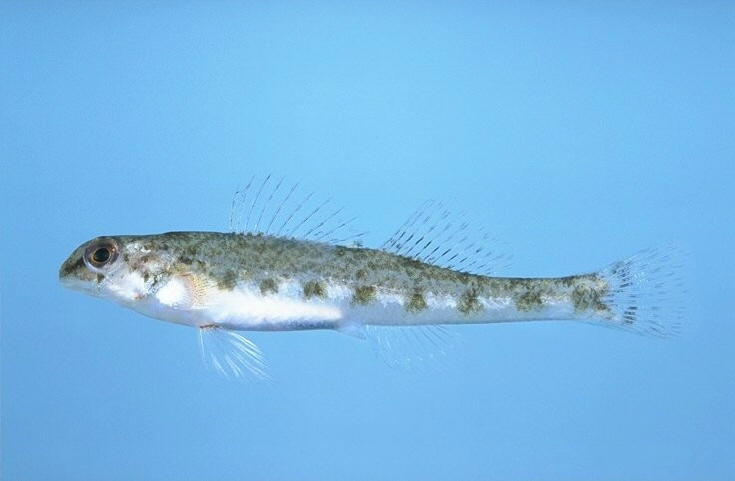

Conservation status
- Least Concern (IUCN 3.1)

Scientific classification
- Kingdom: Animalia
- Phylum: Chordata
- Class: Actinopterygii
- Order: Perciformes
- Family: Percidae
- Genus: Etheostoma
- Species: E. colorosum

Binomial name
- Etheostoma colorosum Suttkus & R. M. Bailey, 1993

= Coastal darter =

Species of fish

The coastal darter (Etheostoma colorosum) is a species of freshwater ray-finned fish, a darter from the subfamily Etheostomatinae, part of the family Percidae, which also contains the perches, ruffes and pikeperches. It is endemic to the eastern United States, where it occurs in the Gulf Coastal Plain from the Choctawhatchee River to the Perdido River in Alabama and Florida. It inhabits sand and gravel bottomed pools of headwaters, creeks, and small rivers.
