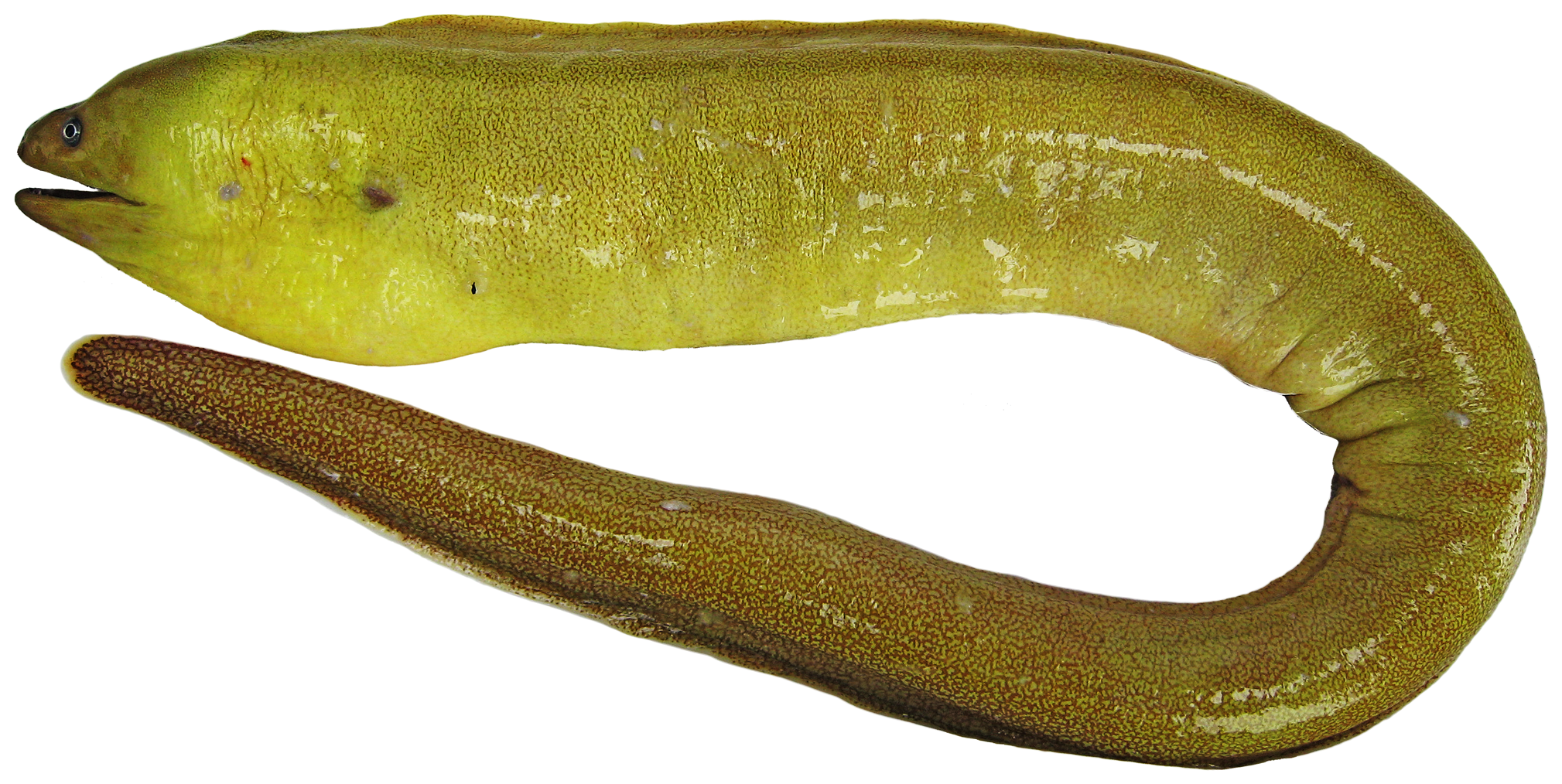

Conservation status
- Least Concern (IUCN 3.1)

Scientific classification
- Kingdom: Animalia
- Phylum: Chordata
- Class: Actinopterygii
- Order: Anguilliformes
- Family: Muraenidae
- Genus: Gymnothorax
- Species: G. maderensis

Binomial name
- Gymnothorax maderensis (J. Y. Johnson, 1862)

= Sharktooth moray eel =

Species of fish from the Atlantic

The sharktooth moray eel (Gymnothorax maderensis) is a moray eel found in the eastern and western Atlantic Ocean.

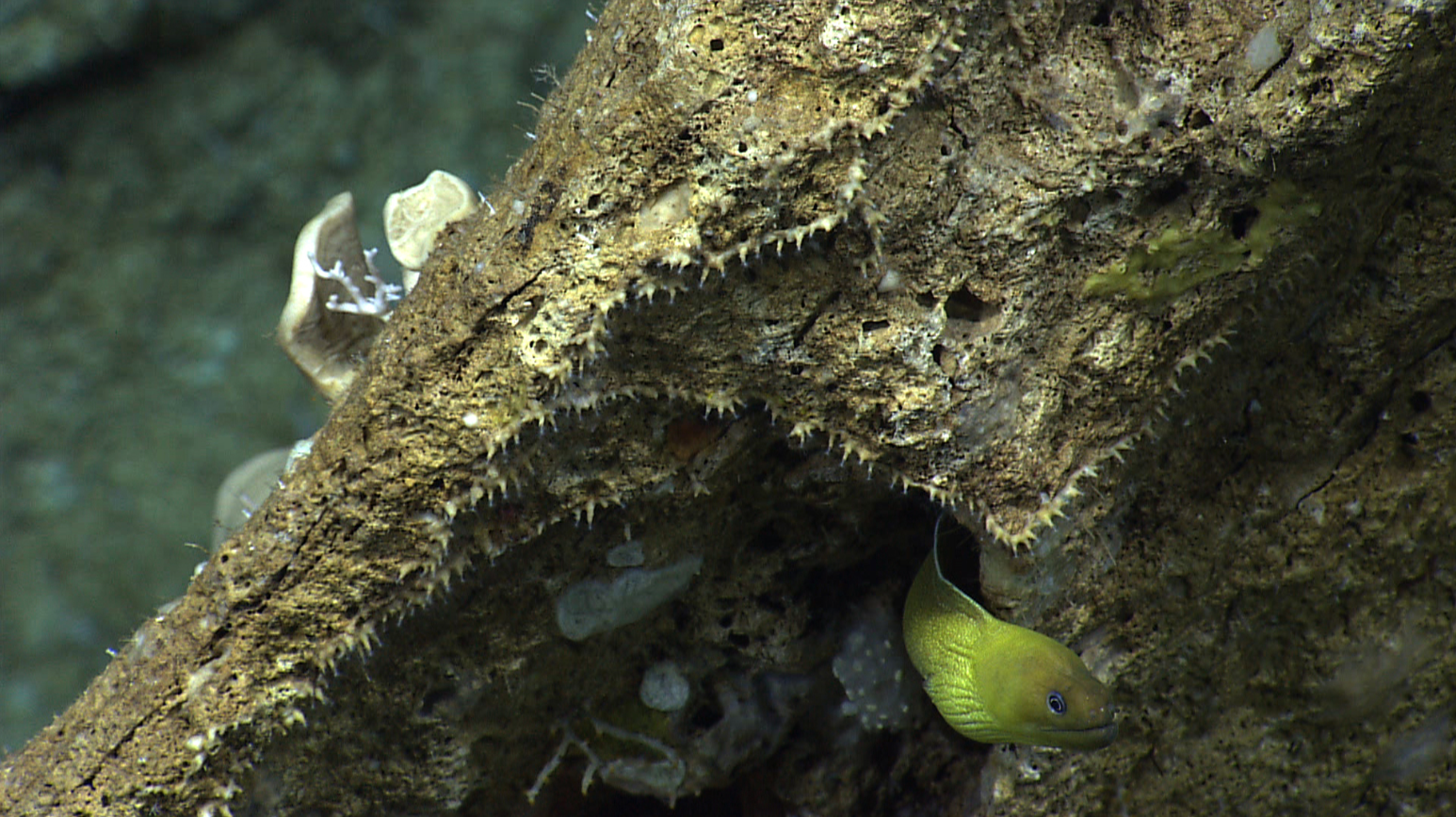
A sharktooth moray eel in the Mona Passage between Hispaniola and Puerto Rico on 12 April 2015.
