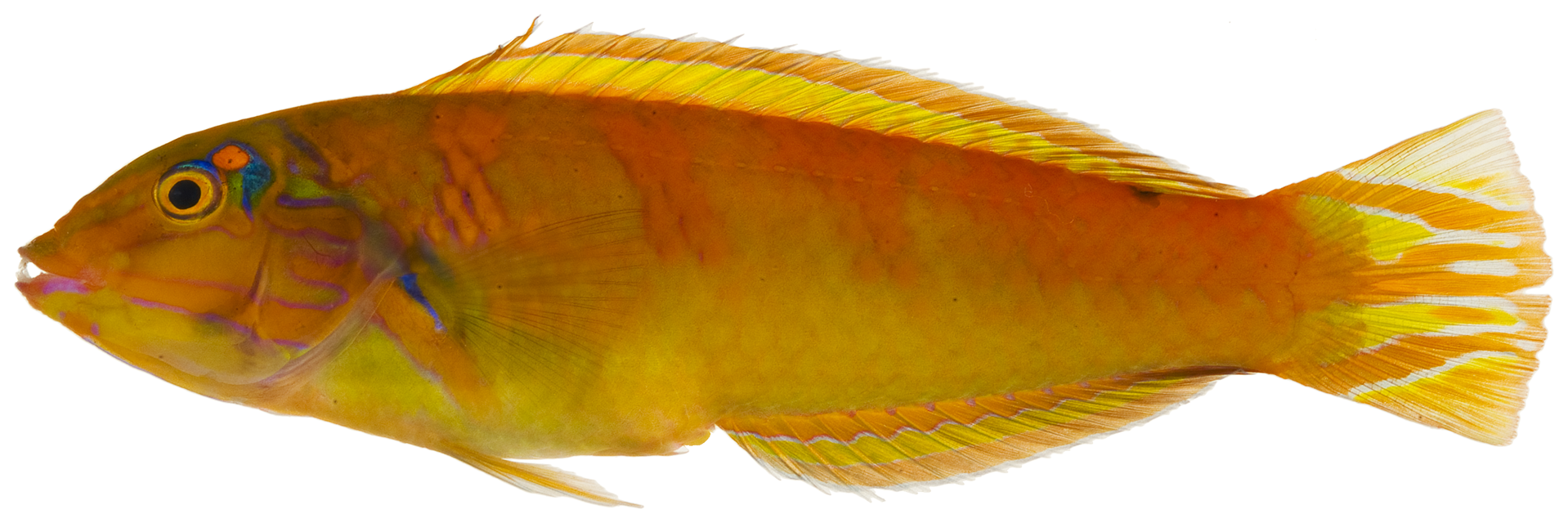
- Terminal male color phase

Conservation status
- Least Concern (IUCN 3.1)

Scientific classification
- Kingdom: Animalia
- Phylum: Chordata
- Class: Actinopterygii
- Order: Labriformes
- Family: Labridae
- Genus: Halichoeres
- Species: H. poeyi

Binomial name
- Halichoeres poeyi (Steindachner, 1867)

Synonyms
- Platyglossus poeyi Steindachner, 1867

= Blackear wrasse =

Species of fish

The blackear wrasse (Halichoeres poeyi) is a species of wrasse, a type of fish in the family Labridae, from the warmer waters of the western Atlantic Ocean.

== Description ==
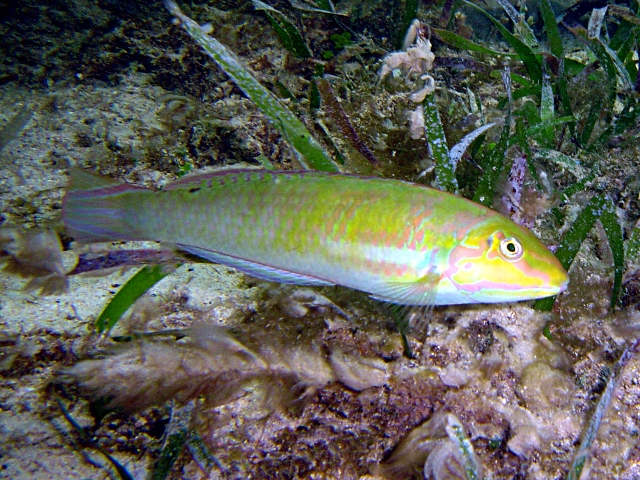
Off of Isla de la Juventud, Cuba

The blackear wrasse has a relatively long, thin body, a large eye, and a pointed snout with a terminal mouth which has protruding canine-like teeth. The pectoral fins extend to the vent. It has wide pink bands and a narrow blue stripe on the head and tail and there is a dark spot behind the eye which gives it the common name blackear wrasse. The background color of the head and body is olive with pinkish-red lined scales. The margin of the dorsal fin is blue and orange and the caudal fin is dull yellow with diagonally converging blue and rose lines. The males and females are similarly patterned but males are larger than females. There is another black spot on the spine near the origin of the dorsal fin. The dorsal fin has 9 spines and 11 soft rays; the anal fin has 3 spines and 12 soft rays. The maximum size of H. poeyi is around 20 cm (7.9 in) in length.

== Distribution ==
The blackear wrasse is found in the western Atlantic Ocean, from southern Florida and the Bahamas to Santa Catarina in southern Brazil.

== Biology ==
Halichoeres poeyi occurs in coral and rocky reefs and also in seagrass, especially turtle grass (Thalassia testudinum) beds at around 30 m (100 ft) in depth. It is frequently encountered in areas rich in algae as well. This species is strictly diurnal in nature and is lethargic during the hours of darkness. It feeds mainly on invertebrates such as decapods, gastropods, sea stars and sea urchins. It is assumed that sea urchins are scavenged after they are predated by larger predatory fish.

This wrasse is a sequential protogynous hermaphrodite: every individual begins life as a females but some fish change sex from female to male as they grow. The average body length at which this takes place is 8.3 cm. The males gather in leks and display showily in an effort to attract females and is this unusual among the wrasses as in most other species the males form harems. Larval H. poeyi are long and thin and have a small mouth and small pelvic fins. H. poeyi is the only species of Halichoeres where the larvae develop internal, specialised, chromatophores.

== Uses ==
This fish is generally of little interest to fisheries due to its small size but it is traded in the aquarium trade.

In Brazil a quota has been imposed since 2004 on companies who catch this species for that trade. The quota is 1,000 fish per year per company.

== Taxonomy ==
The blackear wrasse was first formally described in 1867 by the Austrian ichthyologist Franz Steindachner. The specific name honours the Cuban ichthyologist Felipe Poey (1799–1891), who described a similar species, Halichoeres pictus, in 1860.
