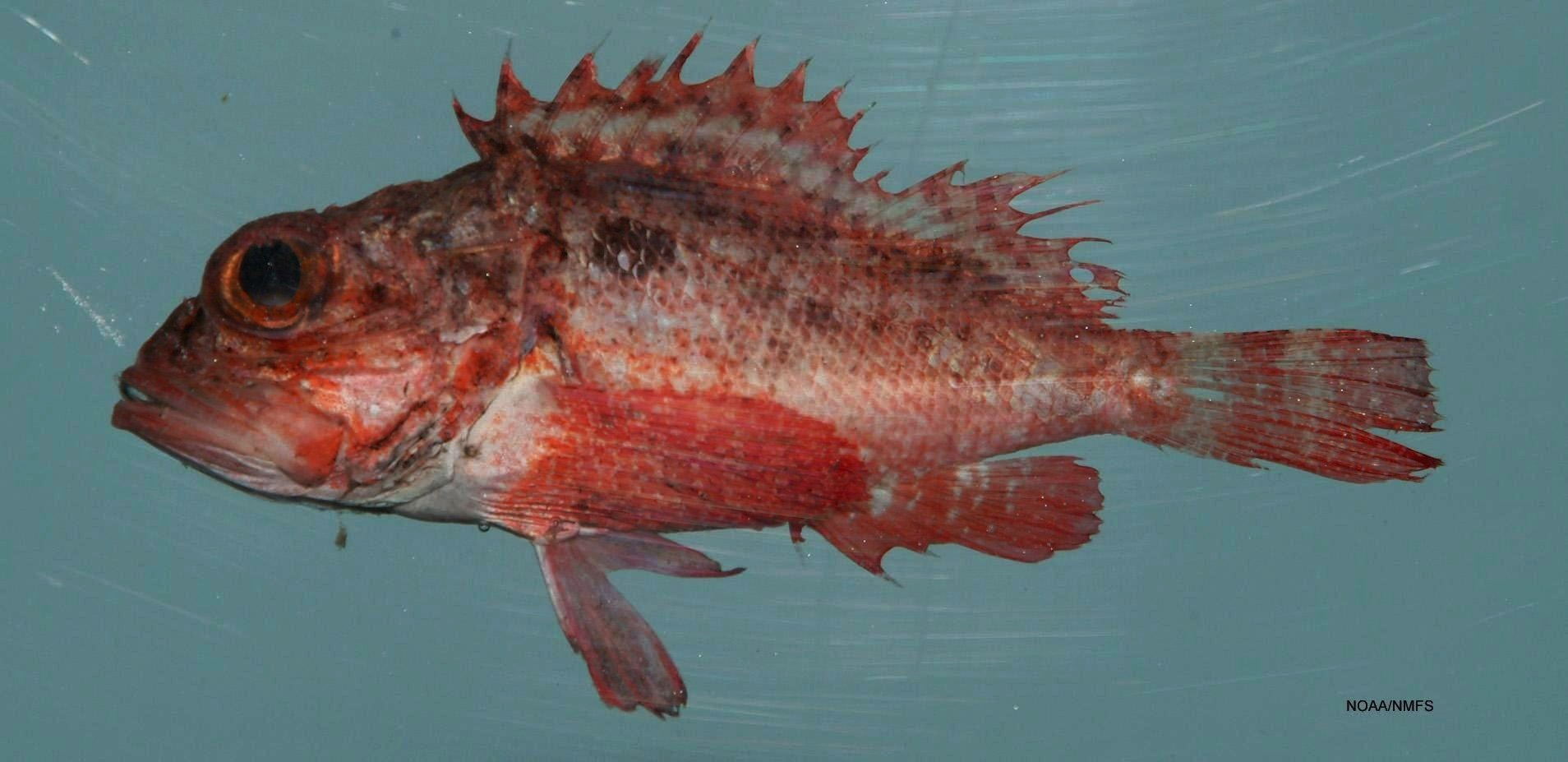

Conservation status
- Least Concern (IUCN 3.1)

Scientific classification
- Kingdom: Animalia
- Phylum: Chordata
- Class: Actinopterygii
- Order: Perciformes
- Family: Scorpaenidae
- Genus: Scorpaena
- Species: S. brasiliensis

Binomial name
- Scorpaena brasiliensis Cuvier, 1829

Synonyms
- Scorpaena colesi Nichols, 1914

= Scorpaena brasiliensis =

Species of fish

Scorpaena brasiliensis, the barbfish, goosehead, scorpionfish, orange scorpionfish and red barbfish, is a species of marine ray-finned fish belonging to the family Scorpaenidae, the scorpionfishes. It is found in the Western Atlantic Ocean. This species has venom on its fin spines.

== Taxonomy ==
Scorpaena brasiliensis was first formally described in 1829 by the French zoologist Georges Cuvier with the type locality given as Brazil. The specific name means "of Brazil", a reference to the type locality.

== Description ==
Scorpaena brasiliensis has a many spined, compressed oblong-shaped body, tapering towards the tail. It has a quite short head and snout with an obvious occipital pi and either a small or absent posttemporal spine. There are two spiny points on the preorbital bone above the mouth while the suborbital ridge has three spiny points, the two anterior points being blunt. There are five spines on the preoperculum, the uppermost having a supplementary spine with the next spine being almost the same size as the third spine, with the fourth and fifth spines being medium to small sized. The mouth has thin bands of small teeth on the jaws, palatine, and vomer. There are well developed tentacles above the eyes. The dorsal fin has 12 spines and 9 soft rays, the anal fin has 3 spines and 5 soft rays and the pectoral fin has 16-20 fin rays. The body is covered in large, smooth scales and the lateral line is complete. The caudal fin is rounded. The background color may be red, brown, greenish-brown, yellow or white. They are paler on the lower body than on the upper and the lower parts of the head and body and the inside surface of base of pectoral fins have small, round dark spots. The pectoral fins can either be green-brown or yellow in the center. There are 3 or 4 brown blotches along the flank below the lateral line and there is no large blotch at the front of the dorsal fin. the caudal fin hash two vague dark bars, one across the center of fin and the other on the rear margin. This species has a maximum published total length of 38 cm (15 in), although 20 cm (7.9 in) is more typical.

== Behavior ==
It has a slow behavior, it is usually camouflaged at the bottom of the coral reef (most often in protrusions and algae). It usually waits buried in the sand at the bottom or in debris, waiting for prey to attack immediately. When threatened, raise the dorsal fins with venom spines (to arch the body in a threatening position). Their prey includes shrimp, crabs and bony fish. They are solitary-behavior fish, meeting other members of the species only during the mating season.

== Distribution and habitat ==
This species occurs in the Americas, in the Atlantic Ocean of Virginia, in the United States, north of the Gulf of Mexico, including the Greater and Lesser Antilles, to South of Brazil. This species has been reported in Bermudas, but has not been seen there since 1927. They mainly live on soft bottoms and coral reefs, from the coastline to depths of 100 meters, in bays, ports, continental shelves.

== Venom ==
These fish are venomous and can pose danger to humans, and they must be handled with care. The venom is located along the spines on the dorsal, pelvic and anal fins. The venom contains neurotoxins, cytotoxins, and potent hemotoxins. Envenomation results in intense and immediate pain, with swelling that radiates to the groin or armpit, which can last for several hours. Systemic symptoms are characterized by sweating, pallor, nausea, vomiting, diarrhea, heart problems, unconsciousness, shock and occasionally death.

== Utilization ==
Scorpaena brasiliensis is traded in the aquarium trade. In the Caribbean this species supports a minor artisanal fishery, it is caught using beach nets and as a bycatch in trawl fisheries for shrimp. The flesh is considered palatable, although it is not normally seen in commercial markets.
