= Choctawhatchee darter =

Conservation status
- Least Concern (IUCN 3.1)

Scientific classification
- Kingdom: Animalia
- Phylum: Chordata
- Class: Actinopterygii
- Division: Teleostei
- Order: Perciformes
- Family: Percidae
- Genus: Etheostoma
- Species: E. davisoni

Binomial name
- Etheostoma davisoni (O. P. Hay, 1885)

Species of fish

The Choctawhatchee darter (Etheostoma davisoni)is a species of freshwater ray-finned fish, a darter from the subfamily Etheostomatinae, part of the family Percidae, which also contains the perches, ruffes, and pikeperches. It is endemic to the eastern United States, where it occurs in the Choctawhatchee and Pensacola Bay drainages in the Florida panhandle and southern Alabama. It inhabits sandy and muddy pools of creeks and small rivers. This species can reach a length of 6 cm (2.4 in).
