= Caralophia =

Conservation status
- Least Concern (IUCN 3.1)

Scientific classification
- Kingdom: Animalia
- Phylum: Chordata
- Class: Actinopterygii
- Order: Anguilliformes
- Family: Ophichthidae
- Subfamily: Ophichthinae
- Genus: Caralophia; J. E. Böhlke, 1955
- Species: C. loxochila

Binomial name
- Caralophia loxochila J. E. Böhlke, 1955

Species of fish

Caralophia loxochila, the Slantlip eel, is a species of eel in the family Ophichthidae. It is the only member of its genus. It is found in the western Atlantic Ocean in shallow waters around the Florida Keys, Bahamas and Brazil.
