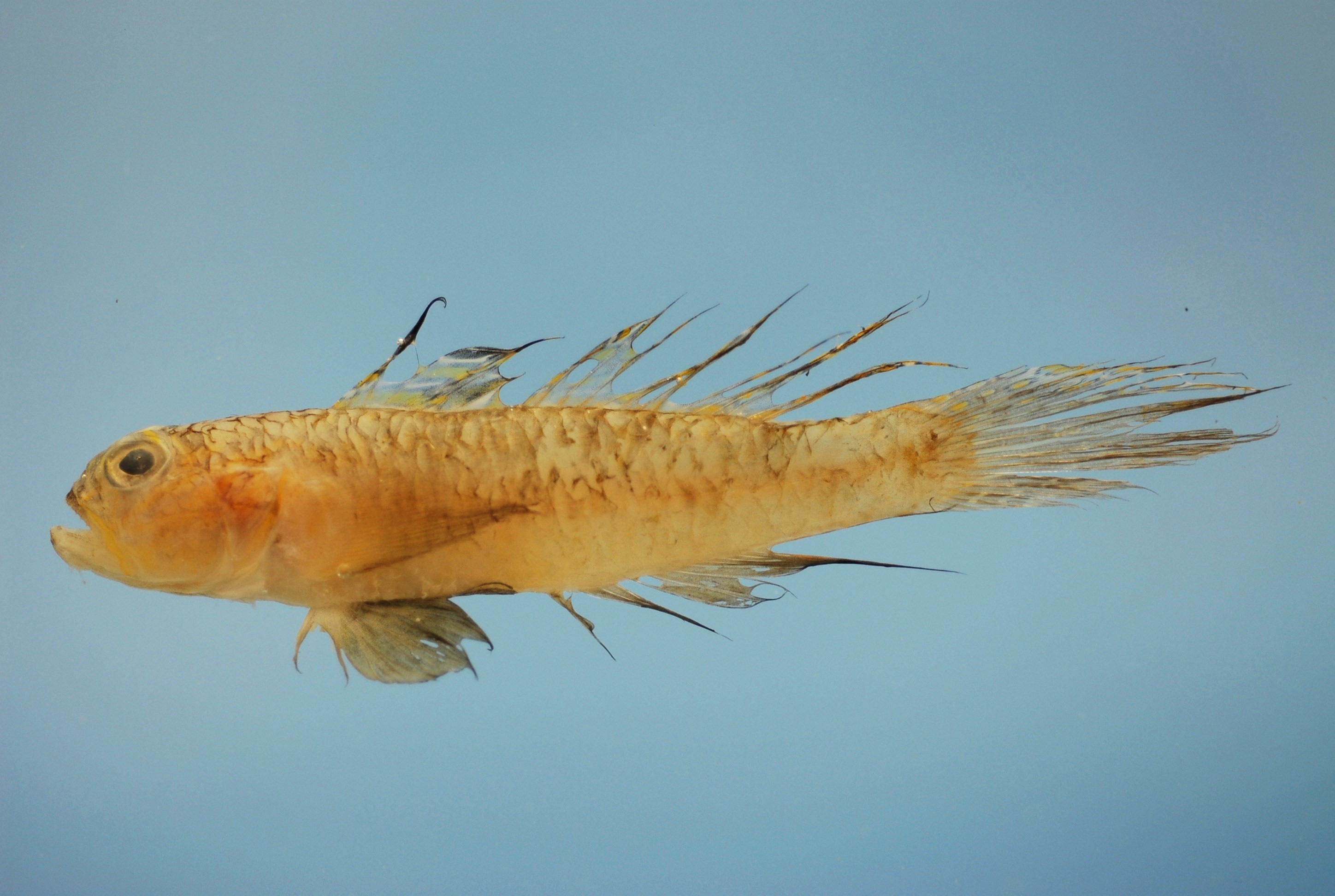
- Ctenogobius boleosoma

Scientific classification
- Kingdom: Animalia
- Phylum: Chordata
- Class: Actinopterygii
- Order: Gobiiformes
- Family: Oxudercidae
- Subfamily: Gobionellinae
- Genus: Ctenogobius; T. N. Gill, 1858

Type species
- Ctenogobius fasciatus T. N. Gill, 1858

Synonyms
- Sinogobius C. K. Liu. 1940

= Ctenogobius =

Genus of fishes

Ctenogobius is a genus of gobies with a wide distribution in fresh, brackish and marine waters.

== Species ==
There are currently 22 recognized species in this genus:

- Ctenogobius aestivaregia (T. Mori, 1934)
- Ctenogobius boleosoma (D. S. Jordan & C. H. Gilbert, 1882) (Darter goby)
- Ctenogobius cervicosquamus H. L. Wu, Lu & Y. Ni, 1986
- Ctenogobius chengtuensis (H. W. Chang, 1944)
- Ctenogobius clarki Evermann & T. H. Shaw, 1927
- Ctenogobius claytonii (Meek, 1902) (Mexican goby)
- Ctenogobius fasciatus T. N. Gill, 1858 (Blotchcheek goby)
- Ctenogobius fukushimai (T. Mori, 1934)
- Ctenogobius lepturus (Pfaff, 1933)
- Ctenogobius manglicola (D. S. Jordan & Starks, 1895)
- Ctenogobius phenacus (Pezold & Lasala S., 1987) (Impostor goby)
- Ctenogobius pseudofasciatus (C. R. Gilbert & J. E. Randall, 1971) (Slashcheek goby)
- Ctenogobius saepepallens (C. R. Gilbert & J. E. Randall, 1968) (Dash goby)
- Ctenogobius sagittula (Günther, 1862) (Longtail goby)
- Ctenogobius shennongensis G. R. Yang & C. X. Xie, 1983
- Ctenogobius shufeldti (D. S. Jordan & C. H. Eigenmann, 1887) (American freshwater goby)
- Ctenogobius smaragdus (Valenciennes, 1837) (Emerald goby)
- Ctenogobius stigmaticus (Poey, 1860) (Marked goby)
- Ctenogobius stigmaturus (Goode & T. H. Bean, 1882) (Spottail goby)
- Ctenogobius szechuanensis (C. K. Liu, 1940)
- Ctenogobius thoropsis (Pezold & C. R. Gilbert, 1987) (Sperm goby)
- Ctenogobius vexillifer Fowler, 1937
