= Gymnothorax miliaris =

Goldentail moray
- Goldentail moray (Gymnothorax miliaris) in the waters off San Salvador Island, Bahamas

Conservation status
- Least Concern (IUCN 3.1)

Scientific classification
- Kingdom: Animalia
- Phylum: Chordata
- Class: Actinopterygii
- Division: Teleostei
- Order: Anguilliformes
- Family: Muraenidae
- Genus: Gymnothorax
- Species: G. miliaris

Binomial name
- Gymnothorax miliaris (Kaup, 1856)

Species of fish

View of the whole body

Gymnothorax miliaris, the goldentail moray, bastard eel, or conger moray, is a species of marine fish in the family Muraenidae.

== Description ==
The goldentail moray is a medium-sized fish that can reach a maximum length of 70 cm, but the ones usually observed are rather average 40 cm in length. Its serpentine in shape body has a brown light or dark background color dotted with small yellow spots. These later are smaller on the head and larger at the tail. The snout and the tail are yellowish. The inside of their mouth is white.

A color morph of the eel, frequently called the "Banana Eel", is mostly yellow with large spots instead of many small spots.

== Distribution and habitat ==
The goldentail moray is widespread throughout the western Atlantic Ocean, including the Caribbean Sea and the Gulf of Mexico, so it is present from Florida, Bermudas until southeast Brazil. Its presence was also reported in the islands from the center of the Atlantic Ocean like Saint Helena and Ascension but also close to the African coast in the Cape Verde Islands.

It typically lives on rocky and coral reef slopes between the surface and 35 meters (115.5 feet) in depth with a maximum reported at 60 meters (198 feet).

== Biology ==
The goldentail moray is a solitary carnivorous fish, it leaves its lair at night to actively hunt its prey along the reef but it has also been observed hunting during daytime. It feeds mainly on small invertebrates like crustaceans and mollusks, rarely on small fishes.
