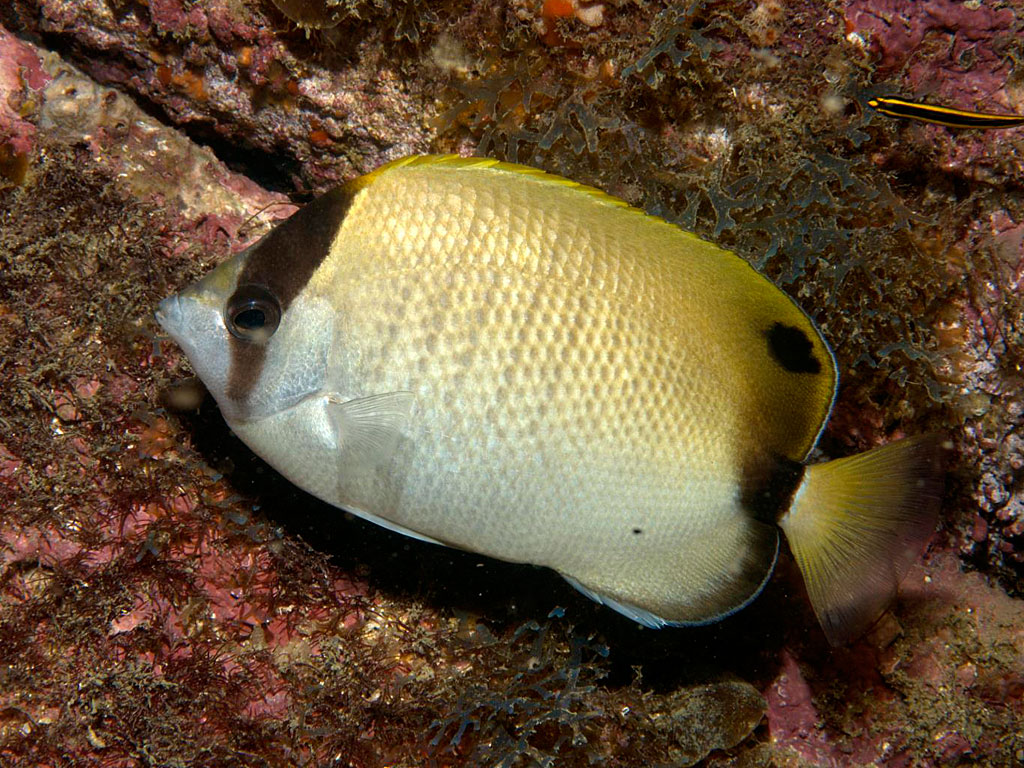

Conservation status
- Least Concern (IUCN 3.1)

Scientific classification
- Kingdom: Animalia
- Phylum: Chordata
- Class: Actinopterygii
- Order: Acanthuriformes
- Family: Chaetodontidae
- Genus: Chaetodon
- Subgenus: Chaetodon (Exornator)
- Species: C. sedentarius

Binomial name
- Chaetodon sedentarius Poey, 1860

Synonyms
- Chaetodon gracilis Günther, 1860

= Reef butterflyfish =

Species of fish

The reef butterflyfish (Chaetodon sedentarius). also known as the least butterflyfish, Atlantic butterflyfish, butterbun or school mistress, is a species of marine ray-finned fish, a butterflyfish of the family Chaetodontidae. It is found in the western Atlantic Ocean.

== Description ==
The reef butterflyfish has a strongly compressed, oval body which is more rectangular in shape than other Western Atlantic butterflyfishes. Its short, pointed snout has no cheekbones and the mouth is situated at its end. The upper body and upper head are yellow fading to white towards the belly and lower head. There is a vertical black bar which runs through the eye and another along the rear edge of the body and dorsal and anal fins. The remainder of the dorsal and anal fins, and the caudal fin is yellow. The juveniles have a less distinct rear black bar and it may just be two spots. The dorsal fin has 13-14 spines and 20-22 soft rays while the anal fin contains 3 spines and 17-19 soft rays. This species attains a maximum total length of 15 centimetres (5.9 in).

== Distribution ==
The reef butterflyfish is native to the warmer waters of the Western Atlantic Ocean from São Paulo state north as far as North Carolina, including the Gulf of Mexico and Bermuda. It has occurred around the Azores but has not been able to establish populations there.

== Habitat and biology ==
The reef butterflyfish lives on rocky and coral reefs to depths of 60 metres (200 ft). Its compressed body means that it can forage by darting in and out of the coral, the small, protractile mouth is a further adaptation to finding food within the coral. The mouth is equipped with long and thin teeth which are flattened, and a little recurved at their tips, These are used to scrape and nip at small invertebrates such as polychaetes, shrimps and amphipods. It is also reported to feed on the eggs of the sergeant major (Abudefduf saxatilis) It can be quite nimble when feeding, frequently swimming upside down to get to prey hiding in crevices. The adults of the reef butterflyfish are most frequently encountered in pairs and may be monogamous and show a strong pair bond. Spawning takes place at dusk following a lengthy and energetic courtship involving circling before swimming upwards and releasing the eggs and milt. Each female will release 3–4,000 eggs at each spawning. The small, transparent, pelagic eggs hatch within 24 hours and initially the larval fish are tiny, translucent and silvery in colour. Butterflyfish larvae, along with the scats, are unusual in that they are armoured, bony plates on the head and body form this armour and this is called the tholichthys stage. The tholichys stage lasts until the length of the larvae reaches 20 millimetres (0.79 in) when they settle on the substrate at night. By the next day they have become juveniles and will hide in crevices until they are large enough to be reasonably secure from predators, emerging into shallow water next to channels or ledges. The reef butterflyfish has many predators, mostly larger fish such as snappers, groupers and moray eels, and it normally flees when attacked but if this is not possible they will adopt a defensive posture and face their pursuer with their head lowered and the spines in the dorsal fin fully raised.

== Taxonomy and etymology ==
The reef butterflyfish was first formally described in 1860 by the Cuban zoologist Felipe Poey (1799-1891) with the type locality given as Cuba. The specific name sedentarius means "sedentary" but its usage is not explained but it is thought that it may be to distinguish this species from the Indo-Pacific species that Alphonse Guichenot misidentified this species for c. vagabundus. C. sedentarius is classified in the subgenus Exornator, if the genus Chaetodon is split up, Exornator might become a subgenus of Lepidochaetodon.

== Utilisation ==
The reef butterflyfish is readily available in the aquarium trade. It is a species which is easy to keep in captivity, and may even be suitable for beginners.
