= Haemulon album =

Conservation status
- Data Deficient (IUCN 3.1)

Scientific classification
- Kingdom: Animalia
- Phylum: Chordata
- Class: Actinopterygii
- Division: Teleostei
- Order: Acanthuriformes
- Family: Haemulidae
- Genus: Haemulon
- Species: H. album

Binomial name
- Haemulon album Cuvier, 1830

Species of fish

Haemulon album, the white margate, grey grunt, grunt, Margaret fish, Margaret grunt, margate, margate fish, ronco blanco, viuda, white grunt, white pogret, or yellow grunt is a species of ray-finned fish, a large grunt belonging to the family Haemulidae. It is native to the western Atlantic Ocean.

== Taxonomy ==
H. album was first formally described in 1830 by French anatomist Georges Cuvier (1769–1832), with the type locality given as St Thomas, Virgin Islands.

The specific name album means "white" refers to the mainly white colour.

== Distribution ==
H. album is found in the western Atlantic Ocean. The northern limit of its range is in Bermuda and eastern Florida, through the Bahamas, the Gulf of Mexico, and the Caribbean Sea. It is found along the coast of Central America from Quintana Roo to islands and cays off Nicaragua. This species has also been confirmed in the waters around the Brazilian oceanic islands of Fernando de Noronha and Atol das Rocas, although it is absent from the mainland Brazilian coast.

== Description ==
At Cozumel, Mexico

H. album has a high-backed, deep, oblong, compressed body with a blunt snout and small eyes. The mouth is not very large and the lips are not fleshy. They have teeth on the pharynx and serrated gill covers. The rows of scales situated just underneath the lateral line are angled. It has a continuous dorsal fin, with only a slight notch between the spiny and soft-rayed parts. The dorsal fin contains 12 spines and 15-17 soft rays, while the anal fin contains 3 spines and 7-8 soft rays. This species attains a maximum total length of 70 cm (28 in), although 50 cm (20 in) is more typical.

The white margate varies in colour from greyish silver to light olive green, although this colour is usually restricted to the back. The scales on the upper part of the body have dark spots. The soft-rayed part of the dorsal fin and the caudal fin are dark grey, while the other fins are pale. An indistinct dark blotch may occur on the gill covers. The lips and shout have a yellow hue and the inside of the mouth is orange. They have a white iris too. The juveniles have a bluish colour marked with dark stripes ventrally. Subadults may also have some blackish colouration on their backs between the base of the dorsal fin and the tail.

== Habitat and biology ==
In the Cayman Islands

H. album is found at depths between 2 and 60 m (6 ft 7 in and 196 ft 10 in) in clear, tropical waters around coral reefs, rocky areas, shipwrecks, and beds of sea grass. The juveniles prefer to be close to sea grass beds. They are typically encountered as pairs or large schools. They are nocturnal feeders, their diet consisting mainly of benthic invertebrates such as peanut worms and heart urchins, for which it has been recorded, nosing into the substrate in search. They also commonly feed on bivalves, crustaceans, and small fishes. The females are able to spawn several times in a season, the spawning seasons being the Spring and Autumn off Jamaica. Spawning aggregations have been reported off Belize.

== Uses ==
H. album is a quarry for commercial fisheries in all of the area of its occurrence. It is caught using traps, hook-and-line, and gill nets. No data on the catch are collected. The flesh is sold fresh and is branded as "silver snapper" in some markets.
