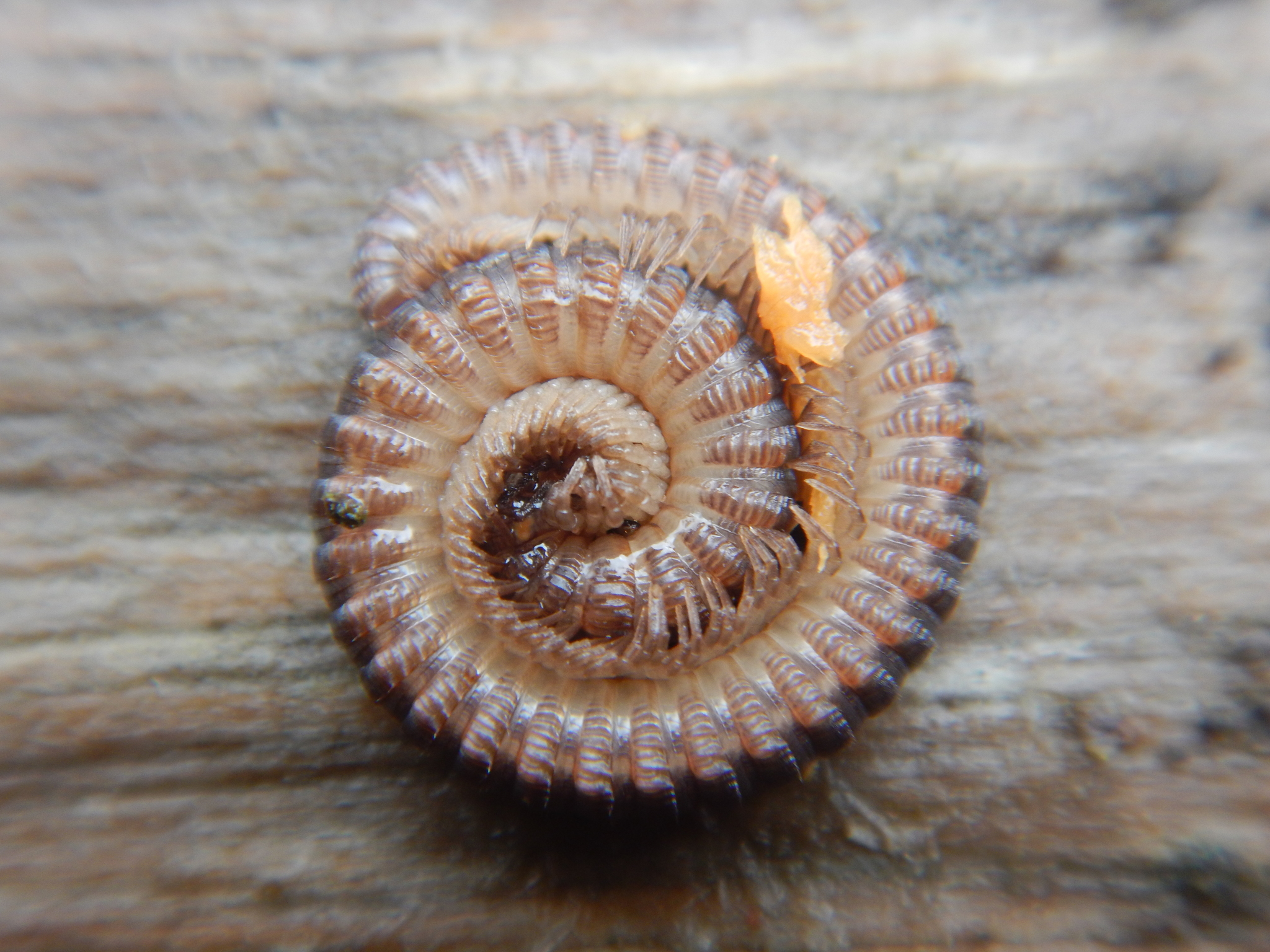

Scientific classification
- Kingdom: Animalia
- Phylum: Arthropoda
- Subphylum: Myriapoda
- Class: Diplopoda
- Order: Callipodida
- Family: Abacionidae
- Genus: Abacion
- Species: A. magnum

Binomial name
- Abacion magnum (Loomis, 1943)

= Abacion magnum =

Species of millipede

Abacion magnum is a species of crested millipede in the family Abacionidae. It is found in North America. In captivity Abacion magnum is known to feed on dead insects as well as dead members of its own species. It produces defensive secretions, shown by infrared spectrophotometry and vapor phase chromatography to contain p-Cresol.
