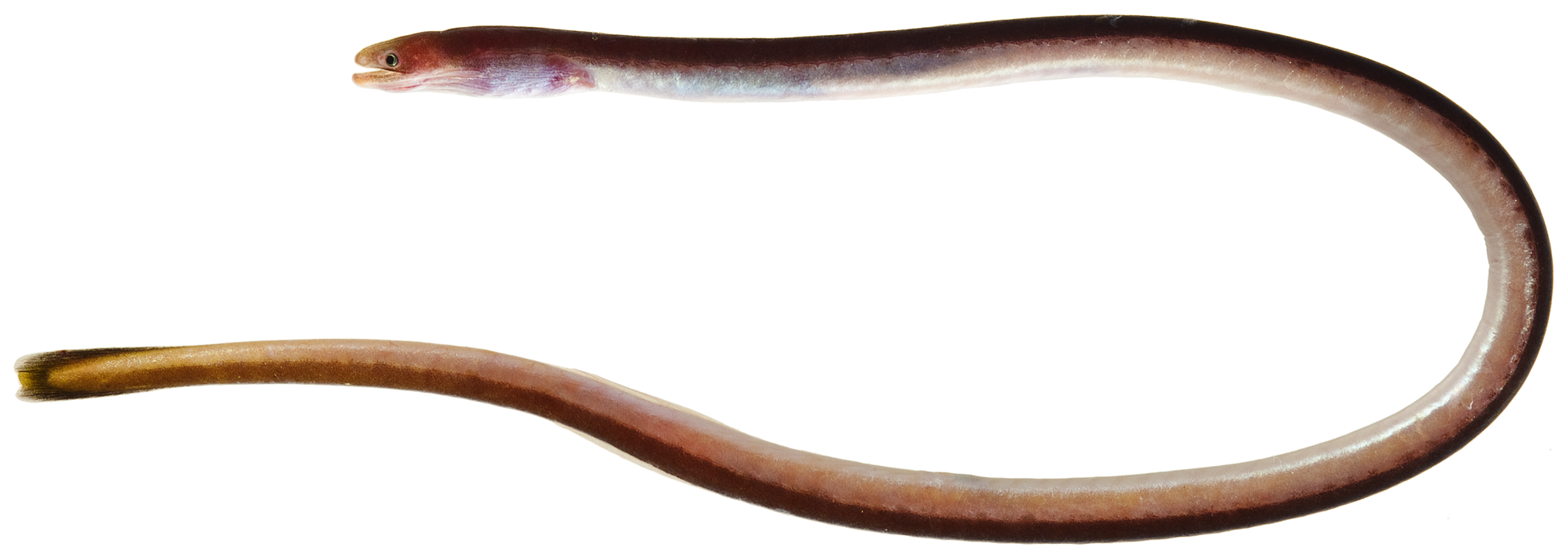

Conservation status
- Least Concern (IUCN 3.1)

Scientific classification
- Kingdom: Animalia
- Phylum: Chordata
- Class: Actinopterygii
- Order: Anguilliformes
- Family: Moringuidae
- Genus: Moringua
- Species: M. edwardsi

Binomial name
- Moringua edwardsi (Jordan & Bollman, 1889)

Synonyms
- Stilbiscus edwardsi Jordan & Bollman, 1889; Aphthalmichthys caribbeus Gill & Smith, 1900; Moringua caribbeus (Gill & Smith, 1900); Leptocephalus diptychus Eigenmann & Kennedy, 1901; Mayerina mayeri Silvester, 1915; Aphthalmichthys mayeri (Silvester, 1915); Moringua boekei Metzelaar, 1919; Moringua boeki (Metzelaar, 1919) (misspelling); Anguillichthys bahamensis Mowbray, 1927; Stilbiscus bahamensis (Mowbray, 1927); Merinthichthys sanchezi Howell Rivero, 1934

= Moringua edwardsi =

Species of fish

Moringua edwardsi, the common spaghetti eel, is an eel in the family Moringuidae (spaghetti/worm eels). It was described by David Starr Jordan and Charles Harvey Bollman in 1889, originally under the genus Stilbiscus. It is a subtropical, marine eel known from the western Atlantic Ocean, including Antigua and Barbuda, Aruba, the Bahamas, Barbados, Belize, Bermuda, Cuba, Dominica, Grenada, Guadeloupe, Honduras, Jamaica, Martinique, Mexico, Montserrat, Nicaragua, Puerto Rico, Saint Kitts and Nevis, Saint Lucia, Saint Vincent and the Grenadines, Trinidad and Tobago, Florida, Venezuela, the Virgin Islands, British, and the Virgin Islands of the United States. Males can reach a maximum total length of 15 cm, while females can reach a maximum of 50 cm. The eels feed primarily off of burrowing invertebrates.

Due to its wide distribution and lack of known threats, the IUCN redlist currently lists M. edwardsi as Least Concern.
