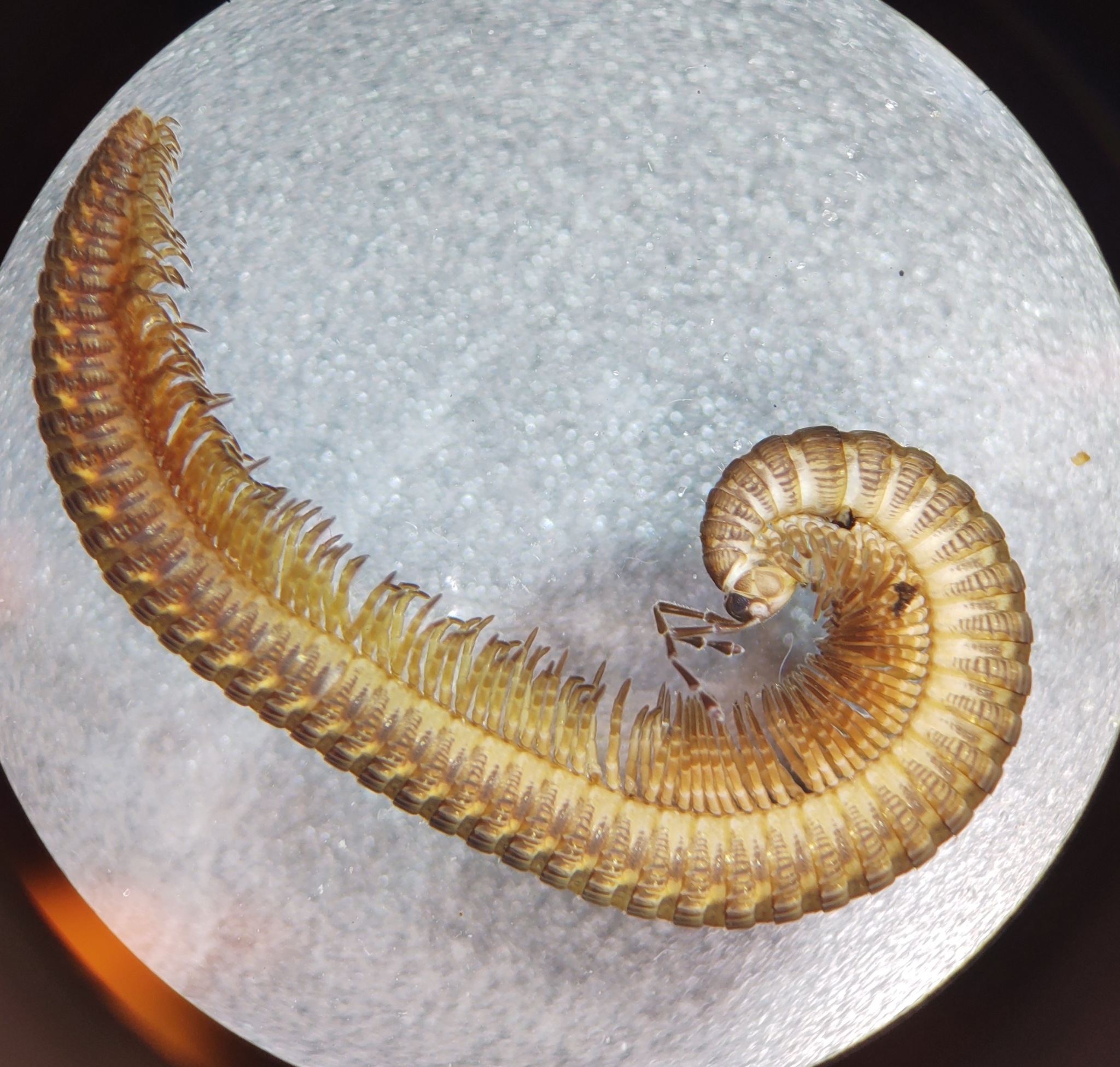

Scientific classification
- Kingdom: Animalia
- Phylum: Arthropoda
- Subphylum: Myriapoda
- Class: Diplopoda
- Order: Callipodida
- Family: Abacionidae
- Genus: Abacion
- Species: A. tesselatum

Binomial name
- Abacion tesselatum Rafinesque, 1820

= Abacion tesselatum =

Species of millipede

Abacion tesselatum is a species of crested millipede in the family Abacionidae. It is found in North America.
