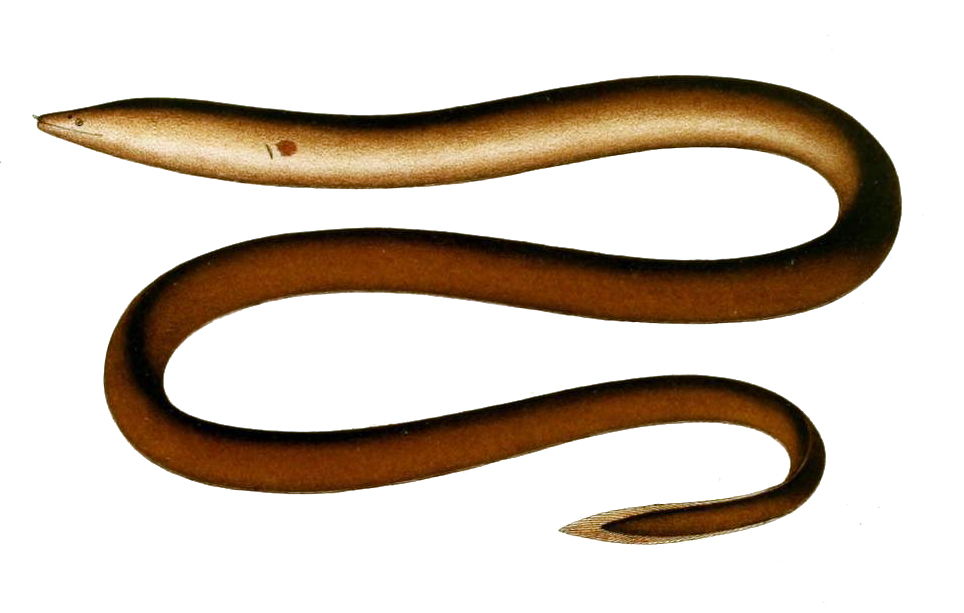

Scientific classification
- Kingdom: Animalia
- Phylum: Chordata
- Class: Actinopterygii
- Order: Anguilliformes
- Family: Moringuidae
- Genus: Moringua; Gray, 1831

Type species
- Moringua linearis Gray, 1831

Synonyms
- Anguillichthys Mowbray in Breder, 1927; Aphthalmichthys Kaup, 1856; Mayerina Silvester, 1915; Merinthichthys Howell-Rivero, 1934; Pachyurus Swainson, 1839; Pseudomoringua Bleeker, 1864; Pterurus Swainson, 1839; Ptyobranchus McClelland, 1844; Rataboura Gray, 1831; Stilbiscus D. S. Jordan & Bollman, 1889

= Moringua =

Genus of fishes

Moringua is a genus of eels of marine ray-finned fishes belonging to the family Moringuidae, the spaghetti eels. These eels occur in shallow tropical and subtropical waters.

== Species ==
Moringua contains these described species:

- Moringua abbreviata (Bleeker, 1863)
- Moringua bicolor Kaup, 1856
- Moringua edwardsi (D. S. Jordan & Bollman, 1889) (spaghetti eel)
- Moringua ferruginea Bliss, 1883 (rusty spaghetti eel)
- Moringua guthriana (McClelland, 1844) (Bengal spaghetti eel)
- Moringua hawaiiensis Snyder, 1904
- Moringua javanica (Kaup, 1856) (Java spaghetti eel)
- Moringua macrocephalus (Bleeker, 1863)
- Moringua macrochir Bleeker, 1855
- Moringua microchir Bleeker, 1853 (lesser thrush eel)
- Moringua penni L. P. Schultz, 1953 (Penn's thrush eel)
- Moringua raitaborua (F. Hamilton, 1822) (purple spaghetti eel)
