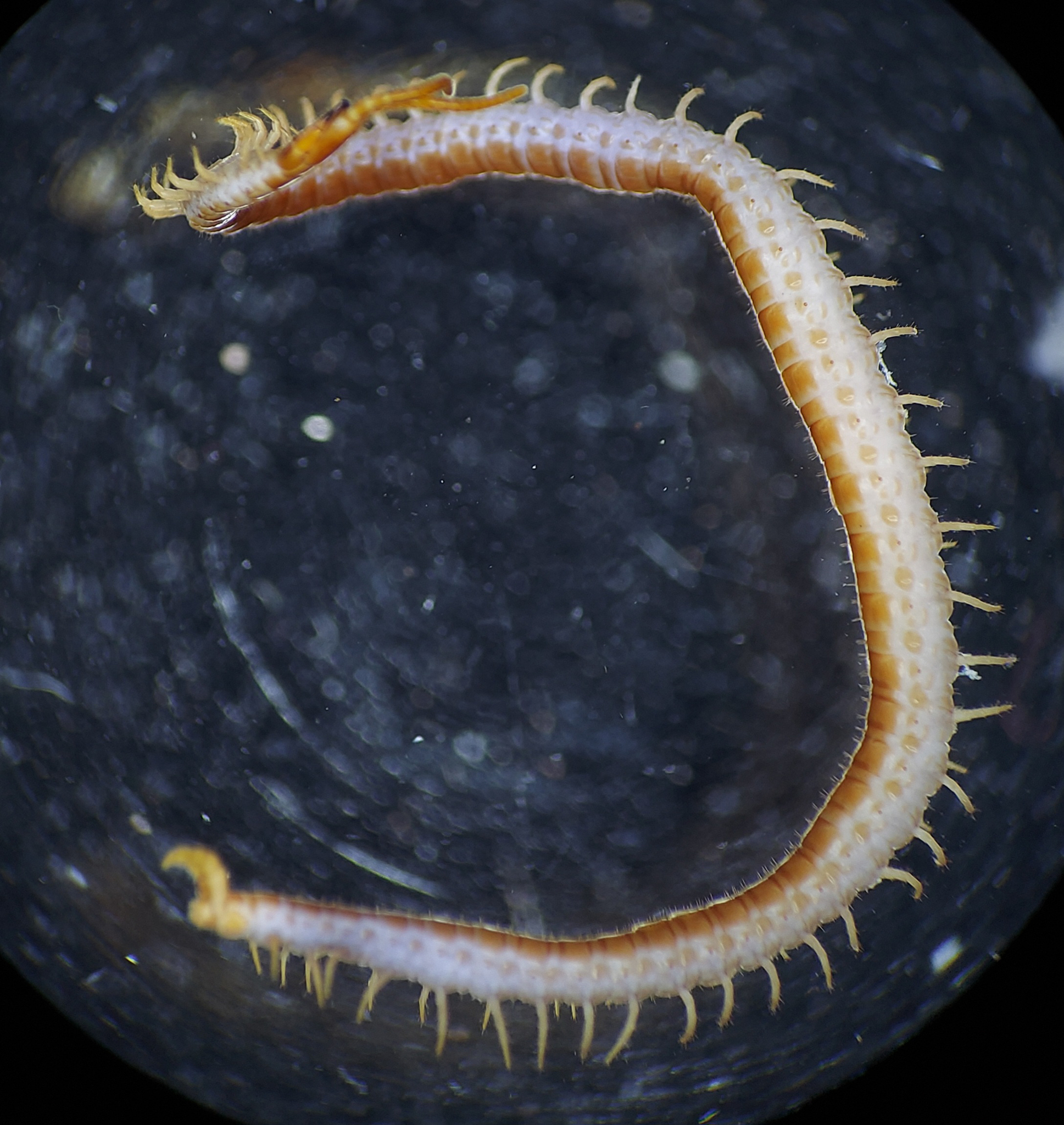

Scientific classification
- Kingdom: Animalia
- Phylum: Arthropoda
- Subphylum: Myriapoda
- Class: Chilopoda
- Order: Geophilomorpha
- Family: Geophilidae
- Genus: Geophilus
- Species: G. virginiensis

Binomial name
- Geophilus virginiensis Bollman, 1889

= Geophilus virginiensis =

Species of soil centipede

Geophilus virginiensis is a species of soil centipede in the family Geophilidae found in Virginia. It grows up to 50 millimeters in length, has 49–57 leg pairs, and is tawny yellow in color.

== Taxonomy ==
G. virginiensis is often confused with G. ampyx and considered by some to be a form of G. mordax, differentiated only by the presence of lateral coxopleural pores on the ultimate legs and variation in color. Some authorities doubt that G. virginiensis is a valid species.
