= Smalleye spaghetti-eel =

Conservation status
- Least Concern (IUCN 3.1)

Scientific classification
- Kingdom: Animalia
- Phylum: Chordata
- Class: Actinopterygii
- Order: Anguilliformes
- Family: Moringuidae
- Genus: Neoconger
- Species: N. vermiformis

Binomial name
- Neoconger vermiformis Gilbert, 1890

Species of fish

The smalleye spaghetti-eel (Neoconger vermiformis) is an eel in the family Moringuidae (spaghetti/worm eels). It was described by Charles Henry Gilbert in 1890. It is a tropical, marine eel known from the eastern central and southeastern Pacific Ocean, including Mexico, Colombia, Costa Rica, El Salvador, Guatemala, Honduras, Nicaragua, and Panama. It is known to dwell at an approximate depth of 55 m (180 ft), and inhabits substrates, burrowing into mud and sand. Its diet consists primarily of shrimp, crabs, benthic gastropods, bivalves, and worms.

Due to its widespread distribution, lack of known threats, and lack of observed population declines, the IUCN redlist currently lists the smalleye spaghetti-eel as Least Concern.
