= Heptium =

Scientific classification
- Domain: Eukaryota
- Kingdom: Animalia
- Phylum: Arthropoda
- Subphylum: Myriapoda
- Class: Diplopoda
- Order: Callipodida
- Family: Tynommatidae
- Tribe: Colactidini
- Genus: Heptium; Loomis, 1937

Genus of millipedes

Heptium is a genus of crested millipedes in the family Schizopetalidae. There are at least two described species in Heptium.

== Species ==
- Heptium carinellum Loomis, 1937
- Heptium scamillatum Loomis, 1937
