= Tynommatidae =

- Tynomma magnum

Scientific classification
- Kingdom: Animalia
- Phylum: Arthropoda
- Subphylum: Myriapoda
- Class: Diplopoda
- Order: Callipodida
- Family: Tynommatidae; Hoffman, 1980

Family of millipedes

Tynommatidae is a family of millipedes in the order Callipodida. There are about 12 genera and more than 30 described species in Tynommatidae, found mainly in western North America.

Tynommatidae was formerly considered a subfamily (Tynommatinae) of Schizopetalidae, but has been elevated in rank to family, and includes North American millipedes from the family Schizopetalidae.

== Genera ==
These 12 genera belong to the family Tynommatidae:

- Aspidiophon Shelley, 2000
- Caliactis Shelley, 1996
- Colactis Loomis, 1937
- Colactoides Shelley, 1997
- Diactis Loomis, 1937
- Etiron Chamberlin, 1941
- Florea Shelley, 1996
- Heptium Loomis, 1937
- Idrionaria Shelley, 1996
- Mexicopetalum Stoev & Shelley, 2009
- Texophon Chamberlin, 1946
- Tynomma Loomis, 1937
