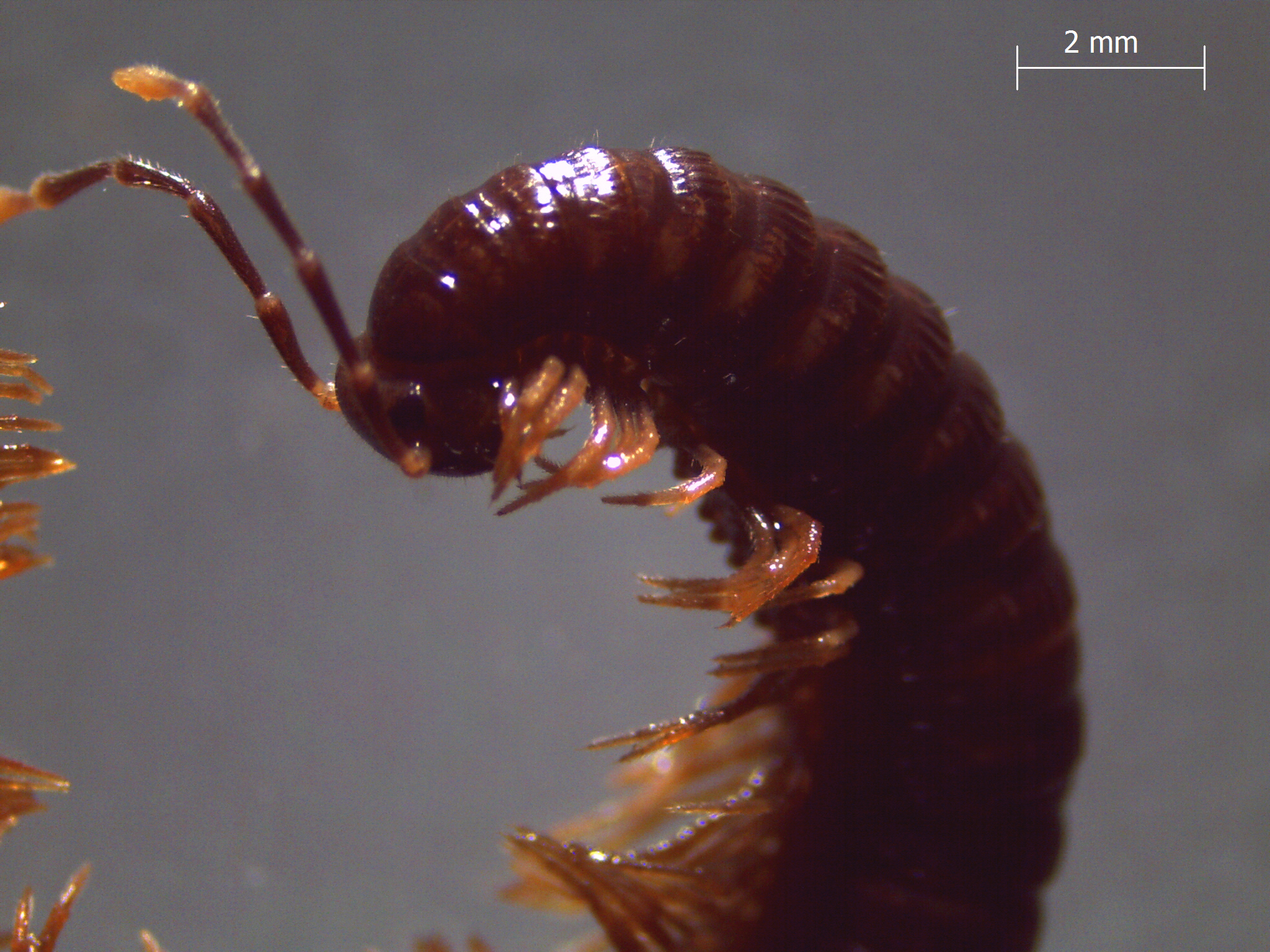
- Apfelbeckia insculpta

Scientific classification
- Kingdom: Animalia
- Phylum: Arthropoda
- Subphylum: Myriapoda
- Class: Diplopoda
- Order: Callipodida
- Family: Schizopetalidae; Verhoeff, 1909

= Schizopetalidae =

Family of millipedes

Schizopetalidae is a family of crested millipedes in the order Callipodida. There are more than 10 genera in Schizopetalidae.

The Schizopetalidae subfamily Tynommatinae was recently elevated in rank to family (Tynommatidae), which resulted in the transfer of these 12 genera to the new family: Aspidiophon, Caliactis, Colactis, Colactoides, Diactis, Etiron, Florea, Heptium, Idrionaria, Mexicopetalum, Texophon, and Tynomma.

== Genera ==
- Acanthopetalum Verhoeff, 1900
- Apfelbeckia Verhoeff, 1896
- Balkanopetalum Verhoeff, 1926
- Callipodella Verhoeff, 1900
- Dischizopetalum Verhoeff, 1900
- Eurygyrus Koch & C.L., 1847
- Euxinopetalum Hoffman, 1973
- Himatiopetalum Verhoeff, 1900
- Micropodella
- Prolysiopetalum Verhoeff, 1909
- Schizopetalum Verhoeff, 1900
