= Dorypetalum =

Scientific classification
- Kingdom: Animalia
- Phylum: Arthropoda
- Subphylum: Myriapoda
- Class: Diplopoda
- Order: Callipodida
- Family: Dorypetalidae
- Subfamily: Dorypetalinae; Verhoeff, 1909
- Genus: Dorypetalum; Verhoeff, 1900

Genus of millipedes

Dorypetalum is a genus of millipedes in the family Dorypetalidae. The seven species of Dorypetalum are found throughout the Balkan peninsula, the Carpathian mountains and Asia Minor.

== Species ==
There are currently seven described species in the genus:

- Dorypetalum bosniense (Verhoeff, 1897)
- Dorypetalum bosporanum Hoffman & Lohmander, 1964
- Dorypetalum bulgaricum Strasser, 1966
- Dorypetalum degenerans (Latzel, 1884)
- Dorypetalum helenae Stoev & Enghoff, 2006
- Dorypetalum marmaratum Hoffman & Lohmander, 1964
- Dorypetalum trispiculigerum Verhoeff, 1900
