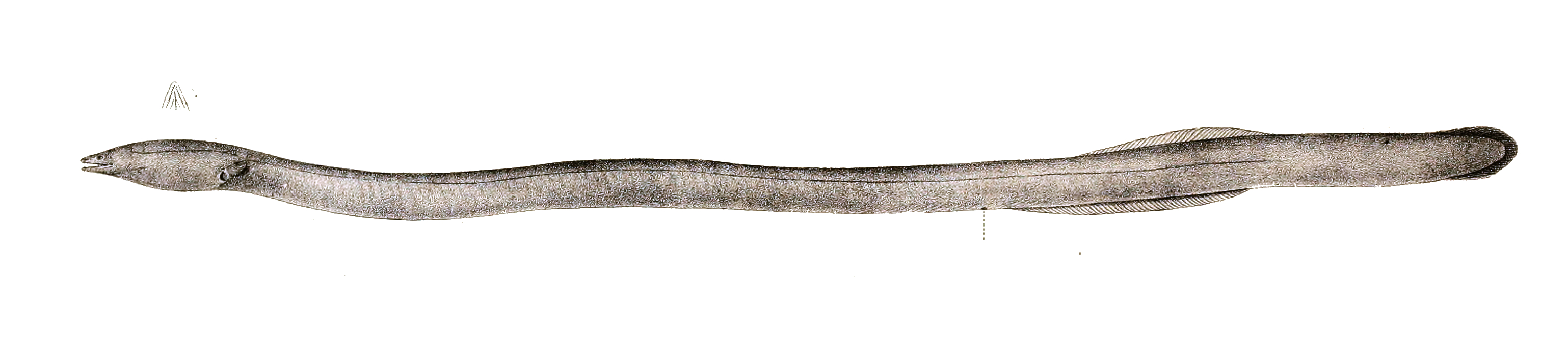

Scientific classification
- Domain: Eukaryota
- Kingdom: Animalia
- Phylum: Chordata
- Class: Actinopterygii
- Order: Anguilliformes
- Family: Moringuidae
- Genus: Moringua
- Species: M. raitaborua

Binomial name
- Moringua raitaborua (Hamilton, 1822)

Synonyms
- Muraena raitaborua Hamilton, 1822; Moringua rataboura (Hamilton, 1822)

= Purple spaghetti-eel =

Species of fish

The purple spaghetti-eel (Moringua raitaborua) is an eel in the family Moringuidae also known as spaghetti or worm eels. It was described by Francis Buchanan-Hamilton in 1822, originally under the genus Muraena. It is a tropical eel known from India, Bangladesh, Nepal, Indonesia, and the Philippines. It inhabits rivers and estuaries, including those in West Bengal, linked to the Ganges River, and has adapted to rapid and wide fluctuations in salinity, pH levels, and both osmoregulatory and hypoxic conditions. Males can reach a maximum standard length of 44 cm.
