= Swollengut worm eel =

Scientific classification
- Kingdom: Animalia
- Phylum: Chordata
- Class: Actinopterygii
- Order: Anguilliformes
- Family: Moringuidae
- Genus: Neoconger
- Species: N. tuberculatus

Binomial name
- Neoconger tuberculatus (Castle, 1965)

Synonyms
- Leptocephalus tuberculatus Castle, 1965

Species of fish

The swollengut worm eel (Neoconger tuberculatus) is an eel in the family Moringuidae (spaghetti/worm eels). It was described by Peter Henry John Castle in 1965, originally under the genus Leptocephalus. It is a marine, temperate water-dwelling eel endemic to Australia.
