= Short worm eel =

Scientific classification
- Domain: Eukaryota
- Kingdom: Animalia
- Phylum: Chordata
- Class: Actinopterygii
- Order: Anguilliformes
- Family: Moringuidae
- Genus: Moringua
- Species: M. abbreviata

Binomial name
- Moringua abbreviata (Bleeker, 1863)

Synonyms
- Aphthalmichthys abbreviatus Bleeker, 1863

Species of fish

The short worm eel (Moringua abbreviata) is an eel in the family Moringuidae (spaghetti eels). It was described by Pieter Bleeker in 1863, originally under the genus Aphthalmichthys. It is a tropical marine eel found in the Indo-Pacific, including Laccadives, the Ryukyu Islands, the Philippines, the Marshall Islands, Samoa, and Indonesia. It is known to inhabit reefs. Males can reach a maximum total length of 33 cm.
