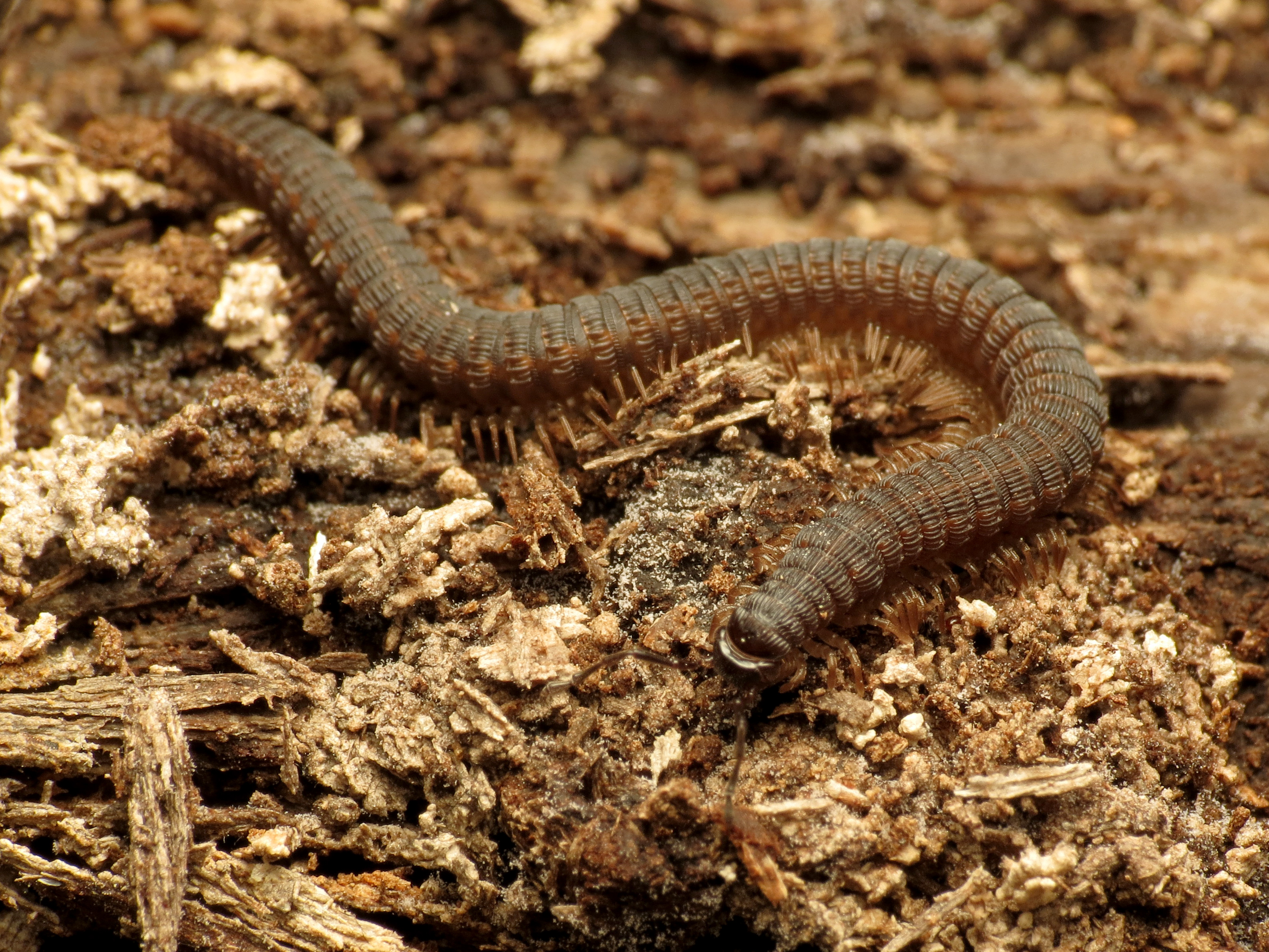

Scientific classification
- Domain: Eukaryota
- Kingdom: Animalia
- Phylum: Arthropoda
- Subphylum: Myriapoda
- Class: Diplopoda
- Order: Callipodida
- Family: Abacionidae
- Genus: Abacion; Rafinesque, 1820

= Abacion =

Genus of millipedes

Abacion is a genus of crested millipedes in the family Abacionidae. There are about 10 described species in Abacion.

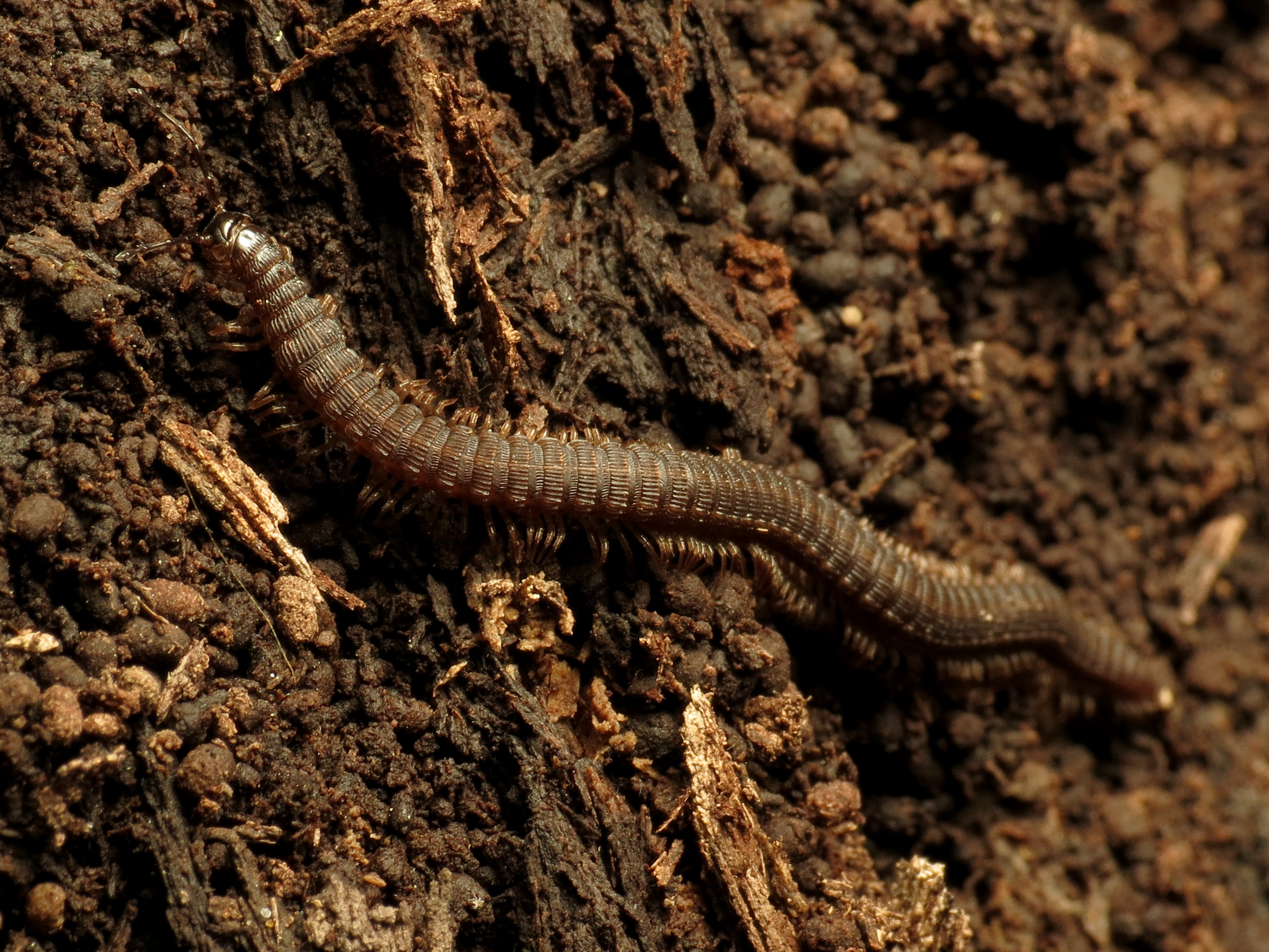

== Species ==
These 10 species belong to the genus Abacion:

- Abacion creolum (Chamberlin, 1942)
- Abacion highlandense (Hoffman, 1950)
- Abacion jonesi (Chamberlin, 1942)
- Abacion lactarium (Say, 1821)
- Abacion magnum (Loomis, 1943)
- Abacion spinosa (Sager, 1856)
- Abacion tesselatum Rafinesque, 1820
- Abacion texense (Loomis, 1937)
- Abacion texensis (Loomis, 1937)
- Abacion wilhelminae Shelley, McAllister & Hollis, 2003

== Identification ==
Abacion are large, dark brown millipedes with six primary dorsel crests between pore crests on body ring 12.
