= Penn's thrush eel =

Scientific classification
- Kingdom: Animalia
- Phylum: Chordata
- Class: Actinopterygii
- Order: Anguilliformes
- Family: Moringuidae
- Genus: Moringua
- Species: M. penni

Binomial name
- Moringua penni Schultz, 1953

Species of fish

Penn's thrush eel (Moringua penni) is an eel in the family Moringuidae (spaghetti/worm eels). It was described by Leonard Peter Schultz in 1953. It is a tropical, marine eel which is known from Papua New Guinea, in the western central Pacific Ocean.
