= Rusty spaghetti eel =

Scientific classification
- Domain: Eukaryota
- Kingdom: Animalia
- Phylum: Chordata
- Class: Actinopterygii
- Order: Anguilliformes
- Family: Moringuidae
- Genus: Moringua
- Species: M. ferruginea

Binomial name
- Moringua ferruginea Bliss, 1883

Synonyms
- Aphthalmichthys intermedius Ogilby, 1907

Species of fish

The rusty spaghetti eel, also known as the rusty worm eel, the slender worm eel, or the intermediate thrush-eel (Moringua ferruginea) is an eel in the family Moringuidae (spaghetti/worm eels). It was described by Richard Bliss Jr. in 1883. It is a tropical, marine eel which is known from the Indo-Pacific region, including East Africa, Easter Island, the Ryukyu Islands, Australia, and Micronesia. It leads a benthic lifestyle, burrowing into sandy regions in reefs at a depth range of 1–40 m. Males can reach a maximum total length of 140 cm.
