= Moringua hawaiiensis =

Conservation status
- Data Deficient (IUCN 3.1)

Scientific classification
- Kingdom: Animalia
- Phylum: Chordata
- Class: Actinopterygii
- Order: Anguilliformes
- Family: Moringuidae
- Genus: Moringua
- Species: M. hawaiiensis

Binomial name
- Moringua hawaiiensis Snyder, 1904

Species of fish

Moringua hawaiiensis, the Hawaiian spaghetti-eel, is a species of ray-finned fish belonging to the family Moringuidae. the spaghetti-eels. This eel is found in the Central Pacific Ocean where it has been recorded from the Hawaiian Islands and Johnston Island. It also probably occurs at Easter Island and other islands of Polynesia.
