= Bengal spaghetti-eel =

Scientific classification
- Kingdom: Animalia
- Phylum: Chordata
- Class: Actinopterygii
- Order: Anguilliformes
- Family: Moringuidae
- Genus: Moringua
- Species: M. guthriana

Binomial name
- Moringua guthriana (McClelland, 1844)

Synonyms
- Ptyobranchus arundinaceus McClelland, 1844; Moringua arundinacea (McClelland, 1844)

Species of fish

The Bengal spaghetti-eel (Moringua guthriana) is an eel in the family Moringuidae (spaghetti eels). It was described by John McClelland in 1844, originally under the genus Ptyobranchus. It is a tropical eel known from estuaries in the Ganges River, between India and Bangladesh. Males can reach a maximum total length of 65 cm.
