= Ridged eel =

Scientific classification
- Kingdom: Animalia
- Phylum: Chordata
- Class: Actinopterygii
- Order: Anguilliformes
- Family: Moringuidae
- Genus: Neoconger
- Species: N. mucronatus

Binomial name
- Neoconger mucronatus Girard, 1858

Synonyms
- Chrinorhinus torrei Howell Rivero, 1932; Leptocephalus anaelisae Tommasi, 1960

Species of fish

The ridged eel (Neoconger mucronatus) is an eel in the family Moringuidae (spaghetti/worm eels). It was described by Charles Frédéric Girard in 1858. It is a subtropical, marine eel known from the western Atlantic Ocean, including the northwestern Gulf of Mexico, Cuba, and northern South America. The larvae have been found ranging from the Straits of Florida to Brazil. It typically dwells at a depth range of 13–180 m, and inhabits offshore banks. Males can reach a maximum total length of 30 cm.
