= Geophilus mordax =

Scientific classification
- Kingdom: Animalia
- Phylum: Arthropoda
- Subphylum: Myriapoda
- Class: Chilopoda
- Order: Geophilomorpha
- Family: Geophilidae
- Genus: Geophilus
- Species: G. mordax

Binomial name
- Geophilus mordax Meinert, 1886

Synonyms
- G. louisianae Brolemann, 1896; G. atopleurus Chamberlin, 1909; G. salemensis Bollman, 1887

Species of centipede

Geophilus mordax, also called the pitted soil centipede, is a species of soil centipede in the family Geophilidae found in North America, especially Indiana, Arkansas, Louisiana, North and South Carolina, and Florida. It grows up to 50 millimeters in length, though it averages 25–40, has 49–53 leg pairs in males and 49–57 in females, and is bright red in color. G. mordax also bears 3–5 labral teeth, a short and robust apical claw of the second maxillae, an exposed prebasal plate, and a large, consolidated sacculi.

== Taxonomy ==
G. mordax is often confused with G. ampyx, though it can be differentiated by the presence of a sacculus or pit on each sternite. It is polymorphic and may comprise two separate subspecies, one with lateral coxo-pleural pores on the ultimate legs (G. virginiensis) and the other without (G. louisianae or G. atopleurus). The latter form sometimes bears a "chitinous thickening" on the postero-ventral surface of the coxopleuron, possibly from closed or vestigial pores.
