= Lesser thrush eel =

Scientific classification
- Domain: Eukaryota
- Kingdom: Animalia
- Phylum: Chordata
- Class: Actinopterygii
- Order: Anguilliformes
- Family: Moringuidae
- Genus: Moringua
- Species: M. microchir

Binomial name
- Moringua microchir Bleeker, 1853

Species of fish

The lesser thrush eel, also known as the common worm eel and the spaghetti eel, (Moringua microchir) is an eel in the family Moringuidae (spaghetti/worm eels). It was described by Pieter Bleeker in 1853. It is a tropical, marine eel which is known from East Africa, Samoa, the Ryukyu Islands, and the southern Great Barrier Reef. It typically dwells at a depth range of 3–20 m, with juveniles inhabiting estuaries and rivers, adult females leading a benthic lifestyle in shallow oceanic waters, and adult males living in the pelagic zone. Adults breed offshore. Males can reach a maximum total length of 47 cm.

The lesser thrush eel's diet consists primarily of crustaceans and bony fish.
