= Lusitanipus =

Scientific classification
- Kingdom: Animalia
- Phylum: Arthropoda
- Subphylum: Myriapoda
- Class: Diplopoda
- Order: Callipodida
- Family: Dorypetalidae
- Subfamily: Cyphocallipodinae
- Genus: Lusitanipus; Mauriès, 1978

Species
- 2, see text

Genus of millipedes

Lusitanipus is a genus of millipedes in the family Dorypetalidae. The genus is endemic to the Iberian peninsula; L. alternans is endemic to Portugal and L. xanin is only known from Spain. It was believed to be a monotypic genus until the 2020 discovery of L. xanin.

== Species ==
There are currently two species in the genus:

- Lusitanipus alternans (Verhoeff, 1893)
- Lusitanipus xanin Gilgado, Martínez-Pillado & Prieto, 2020
