= Schizopetalum (millipede) =

Scientific classification
- Domain: Eukaryota
- Kingdom: Animalia
- Phylum: Arthropoda
- Subphylum: Myriapoda
- Class: Diplopoda
- Order: Callipodida
- Family: Schizopetalidae
- Genus: Schizopetalum

Genus of millipedes

Schizopetalum is a genus of crested millipedes in the family Schizopetalidae. There is at least one described species in Schizopetalum, S. koelbeli.
