= Neoconger =

Scientific classification
- Kingdom: Animalia
- Phylum: Chordata
- Class: Actinopterygii
- Order: Anguilliformes
- Family: Moringuidae
- Genus: Neoconger; Girard, 1858

Type species
- Neoconger mucronatus Girard, 1858

Synonyms
- Chrinorhinus Howell-Rivero, 1932

Genus of fishes

Neoconger is a genus of eels of marine ray-finned fishes belonging to the family Moringuidae, the spaghetti eels. These eels occur in shallow tropical and subtropical waters.

== Species ==
Neoconger contains these described species:

- Neoconger anaelisae (Tommasi, 1960)
- Neoconger hygomi D. G. Smith, 2024
- Neoconger mucronatus Girard, 1858 (ridged eel)
- Neoconger torrei (Howell-Rivero, 1932)
- Neoconger tuberculatus (Castle, 1965) (swollengut worm eel)
- Neoconger vermiformis C. H. Gilbert, 1890 (smalleye spaghetti-eel)
