= Moringua macrochir =

Scientific classification
- Domain: Eukaryota
- Kingdom: Animalia
- Phylum: Chordata
- Class: Actinopterygii
- Order: Anguilliformes
- Family: Moringuidae
- Genus: Moringua
- Species: M. macrochir

Binomial name
- Moringua macrochir Bleeker, 1855

Species of fish

Moringua macrochir, the longfin spaghetti eel, is an eel in the family Moringuidae (spaghetti/worm eels). It was described by Pieter Bleeker in 1855. It is a tropical, marine and freshwater eel which is known from Batu Island, Indonesia, and Christmas Island, in the eastern Indian Ocean.
