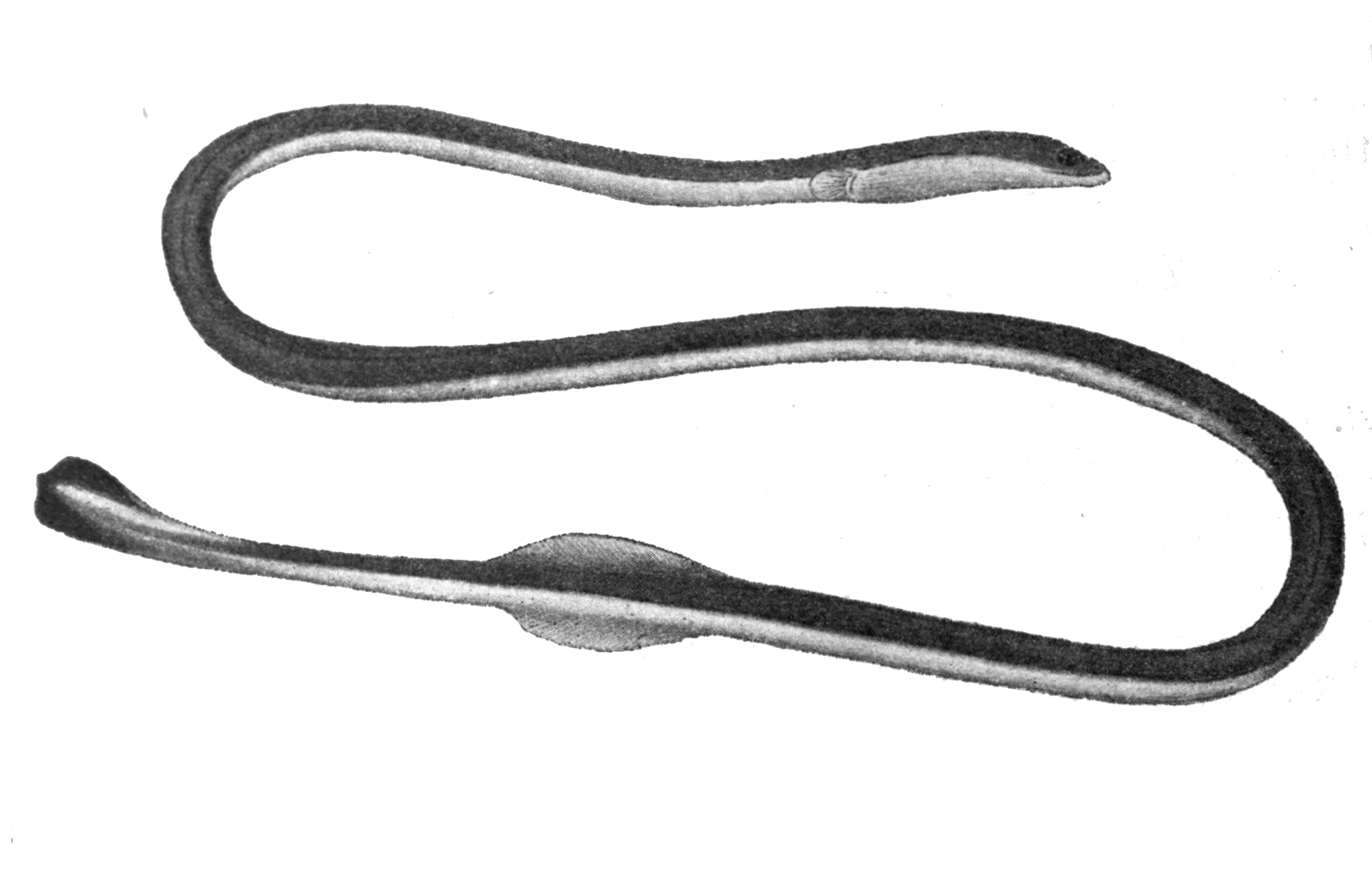

Scientific classification
- Domain: Eukaryota
- Kingdom: Animalia
- Phylum: Chordata
- Class: Actinopterygii
- Order: Anguilliformes
- Family: Moringuidae
- Genus: Moringua
- Species: M. bicolor

Binomial name
- Moringua bicolor Kaup, 1856

Synonyms
- Moringua bicolour Kaup, 1856

= Moringua bicolor =

Species of fish

Moringua bicolor, the bicolor spaghetti eel, is an eel in the family Moringuidae (spaghetti/worm eels). It was described by Johann Jakob Kaup in 1856. It is a marine eel known from Japan, Indonesia, the Philippines, and the Laccadive Sea, in the Indo-West Pacific. It dwells in temperate waters at a known depth of 3 m (9.8 ft).

Moringua bicolor is the first moringuid eel to be described from Japan.
