= Moringua macrocephalus =

Scientific classification
- Domain: Eukaryota
- Kingdom: Animalia
- Phylum: Chordata
- Class: Actinopterygii
- Order: Anguilliformes
- Family: Moringuidae
- Genus: Moringua
- Species: M. macrocephalus

Binomial name
- Moringua macrocephalus (Bleeker, 1863)

Synonyms
- Aphthalmichthys macrocephalus Bleeker, 1863

Species of fish

Moringua macrocephalus is an eel in the family Moringuidae (spaghetti/worm eels). It was described by Pieter Bleeker in 1863, originally under the genus Aphthalmichthys. It is a subtropical, freshwater eel which is known from rivers in the east and south China Sea. It typically dwells in river mouths and mud flats. Males can reach a maximum standard length of 36.5 centimetres.
