= Bollmania =

Scientific classification
- Kingdom: Animalia
- Phylum: Arthropoda
- Subphylum: Myriapoda
- Class: Diplopoda
- Order: Callipodida
- Suborder: Schizopetalidea
- Family: Caspiopetalidae; Lohmander, 1931
- Genus: Bollmania; Silvestri, 1896

Synonyms
- Trypostrphon Cook, 1896; Apatidea Attems, 1936; Caspiopetalum Lohmander, 1931; Iranopetalum Attems, 1951

Genus of millipedes

Bollmania is a genus of millipedes with around six species occurring from Central through East Asia, including Iran, Pakistan, Tajikistan, and China. The genus was established by entomologist Filippo Silvestri in 1896, and is named in honor of Charles Harvey Bollman. Bollmania is the sole genus of the family Caspiopetalidae.

Species and their distribution include:

- Bollmania beroni - China
- Bollmania gracilis - Iran
- Bollmania kohalana - Pakistan
- Bollmania nematogona - Iran
- Bollmania nodifrons - Tajikistan
- Bollmania oblonga - Tajikistan
- Bollmania serrata - Tajikistan
