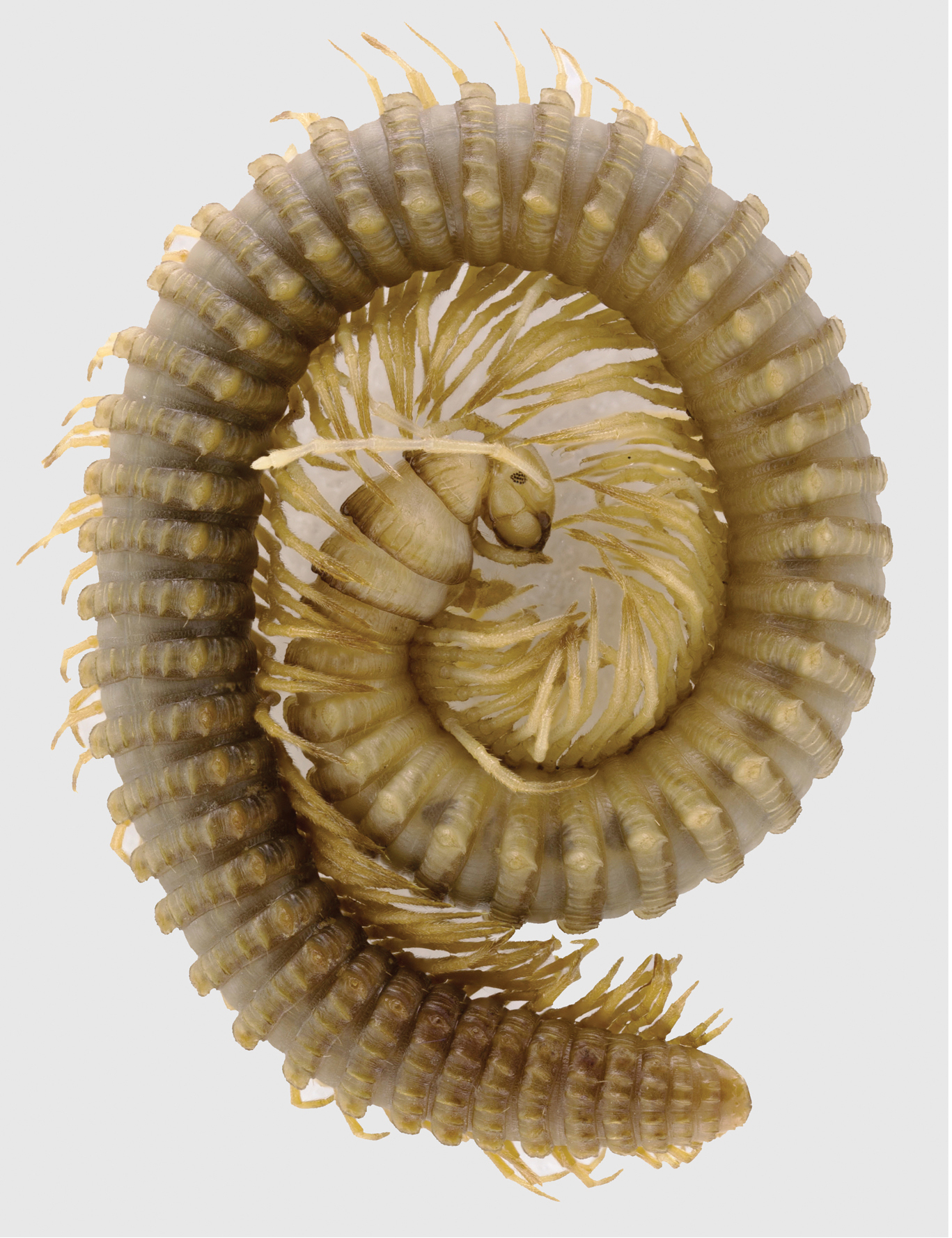
- Paracortina zhangi

Scientific classification
- Kingdom: Animalia
- Phylum: Arthropoda
- Subphylum: Myriapoda
- Class: Diplopoda
- Order: Callipodida
- Suborder: Schizopetalidea
- Family: Paracortinidae; Wang & Zhang, 1993

Diversity
- 12 species in 2 genera, see text

= Paracortinidae =

Family of myriapods

Paracortinidae is a family of millipedes in the order Callipodida. It is currently made up of two genera and about 12 species; however, genetic studies are needed to properly determine the structure of the family. The members of the family are found across Vietnam and southern China.

== Genera ==
There are currently two genera in Paracortinidae:

- Angulifemur Zhang, 1997
- Paracortina Wang & Zhang, 1993
- Vietpetalum Hung, 2026
