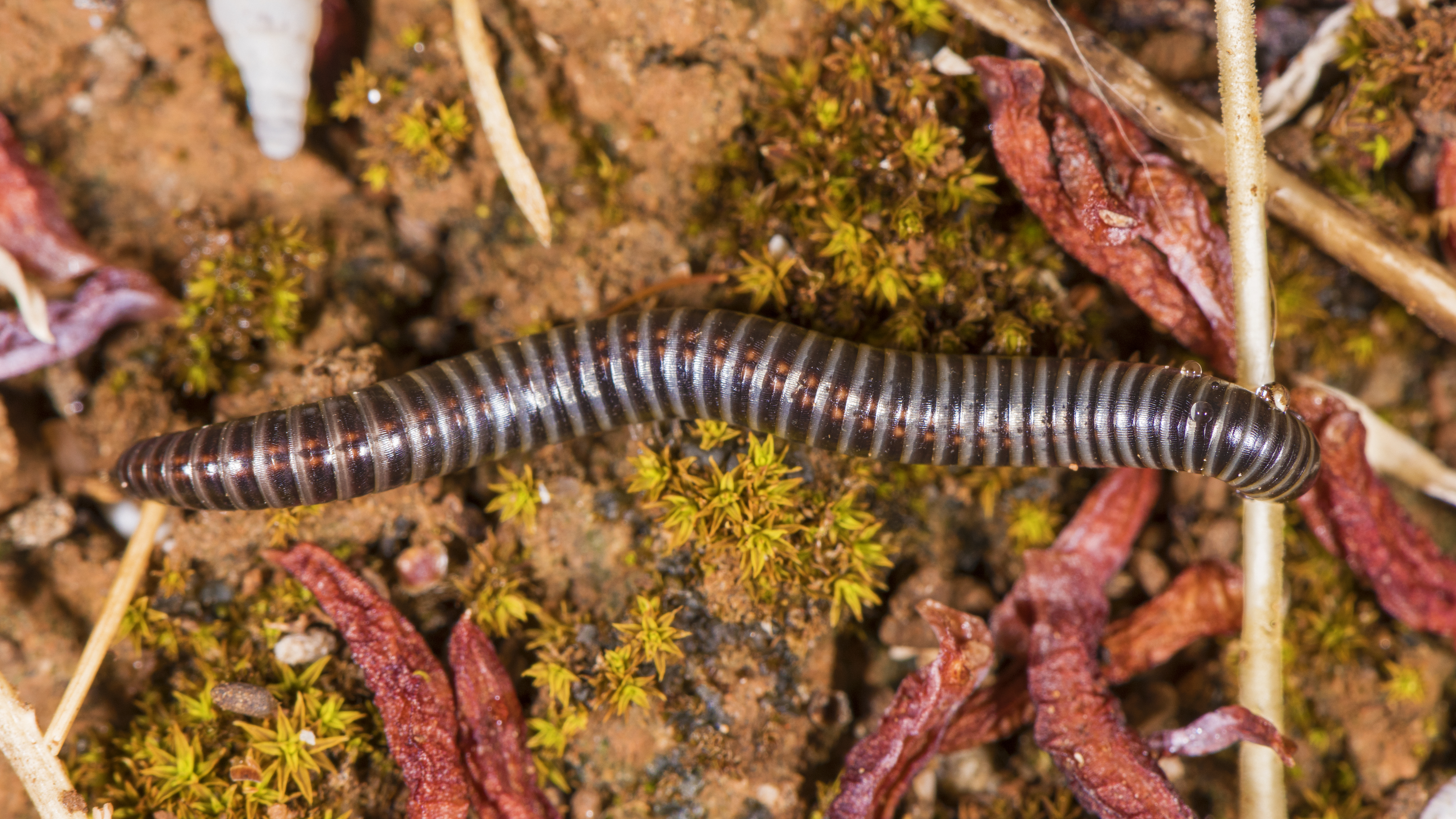

Scientific classification
- Domain: Eukaryota
- Kingdom: Animalia
- Phylum: Arthropoda
- Subphylum: Myriapoda
- Class: Diplopoda
- Order: Callipodida
- Family: Callipodidae

= Callipodidae =

Family of millipedes

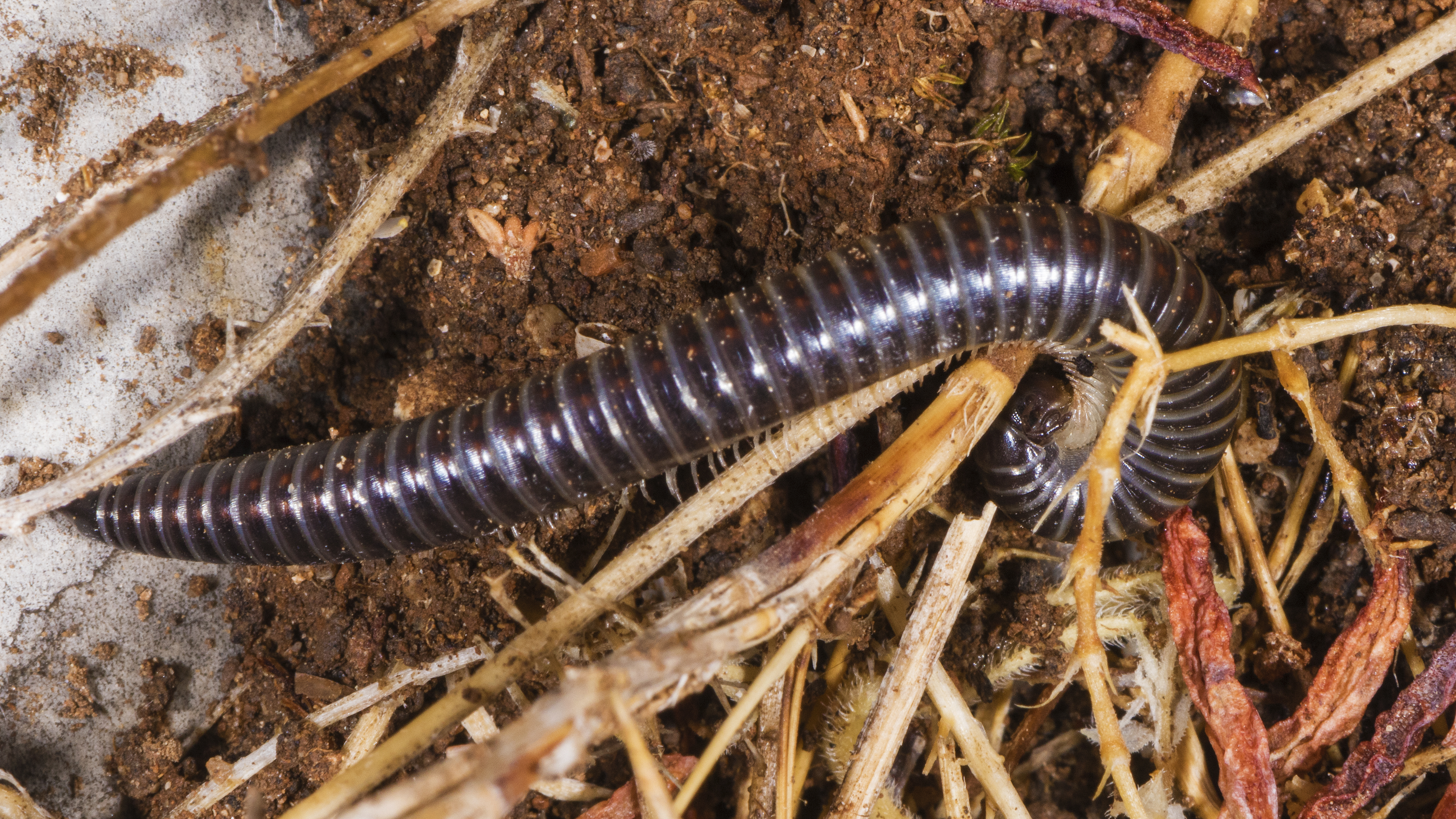

Callipodidae is a family of millipedes belonging to the order Callipodida.

Genera:

- Anopetalum Verhoeff, 1941
- Callipus Risso, 1826
- Euopus Leach, 1830
- Lysiopetalum
- Sardopus Strasser, 1974
- Silvestria
