= Dorypetalidae =

Scientific classification
- Kingdom: Animalia
- Phylum: Arthropoda
- Subphylum: Myriapoda
- Class: Diplopoda
- Order: Callipodida
- Suborder: Schizopetalidea
- Family: Dorypetalidae; Verhoeff, 1900

Genera
- See text

Family of millipedes

Dorypetalidae is a family of millipedes in the order Callipodida. The family contains at least 4 genera and about 10 species.

== Genera ==
There are four known genera divided into two subfamilies:

Subfamily Dorypetalinae

- Dorypetalum Verhoeff, 1900

Subfamily Cyphocallipodinae

- Cyphocallipus Verhoeff, 1909
- Dorycallipus Verhoeff, 1909
- Lusitanipus Mauriès, 1978
