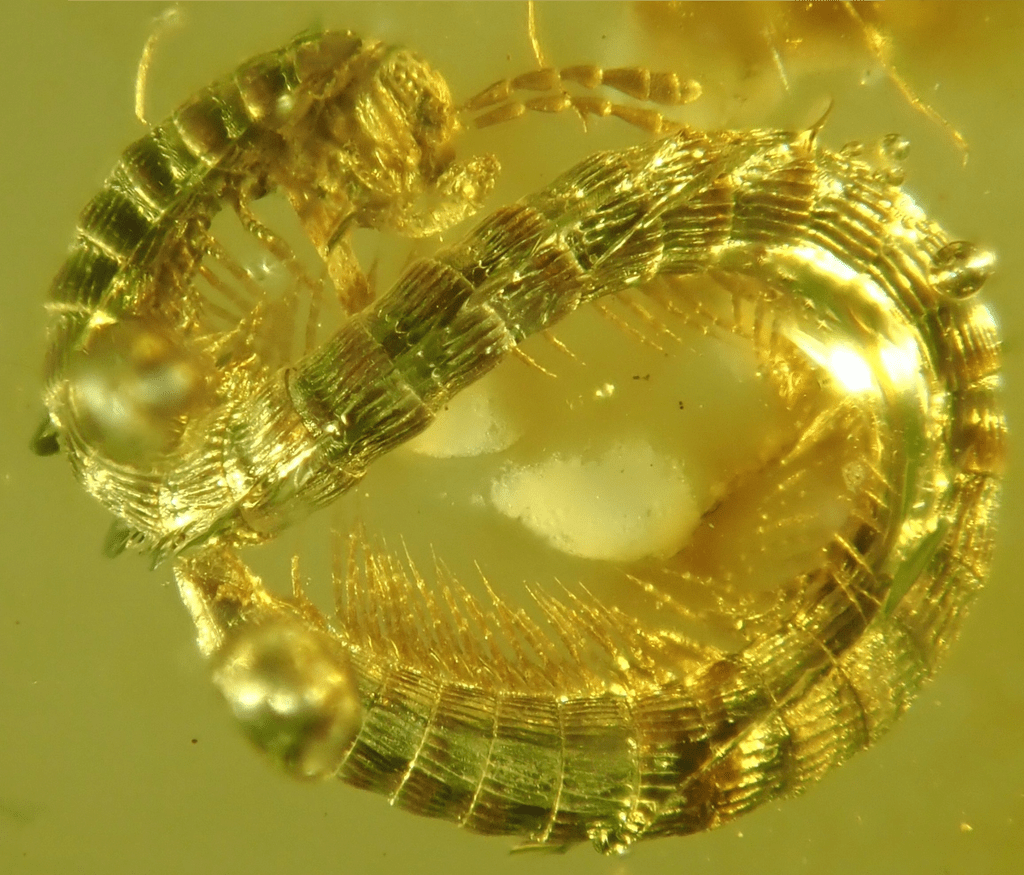

Scientific classification
- Domain: Eukaryota
- Kingdom: Animalia
- Phylum: Arthropoda
- Subphylum: Myriapoda
- Class: Diplopoda
- Order: Callipodida
- Suborder: †Burmanopetalidea
- Family: †Burmanopetalidae
- Genus: †Burmanopetalum
- Species: †B. inexpectatum

Binomial name
- †Burmanopetalum inexpectatum Stoev, Moritz and Wesener, 2019

= Burmanopetalum =

Burmanopetalum Temporal range: Earliest Cenomanian, 99 Ma

Extinct genus of millipedes

Burmanopetalum is an extinct genus of millipede containing the single species Burmanopetalum inexpectatum from the Cretaceous of Myanmar. It is a member of the order Callipodida and is the only member of the suborder Burmanopetalidea and family Burmanopetalidae.

Video of 3d scan

== Description ==
The holotype adult female specimen is just over 8 millimetres long, which is extremely small for the order, it is distinguished by the presence of 35 cylindrical body rings with free sternites and fused tergites, among other characters.

== Discovery ==
The specimen was discovered in Burmese amber, a productive amber deposit in Kachin State, which has been dated to earliest Cenomanian, or approximately 99 million years old. As of the time of publication, it is the only known callipodid in the Burmese amber out of 529 known millipede specimens, most of which belong to extant families and even genera.
