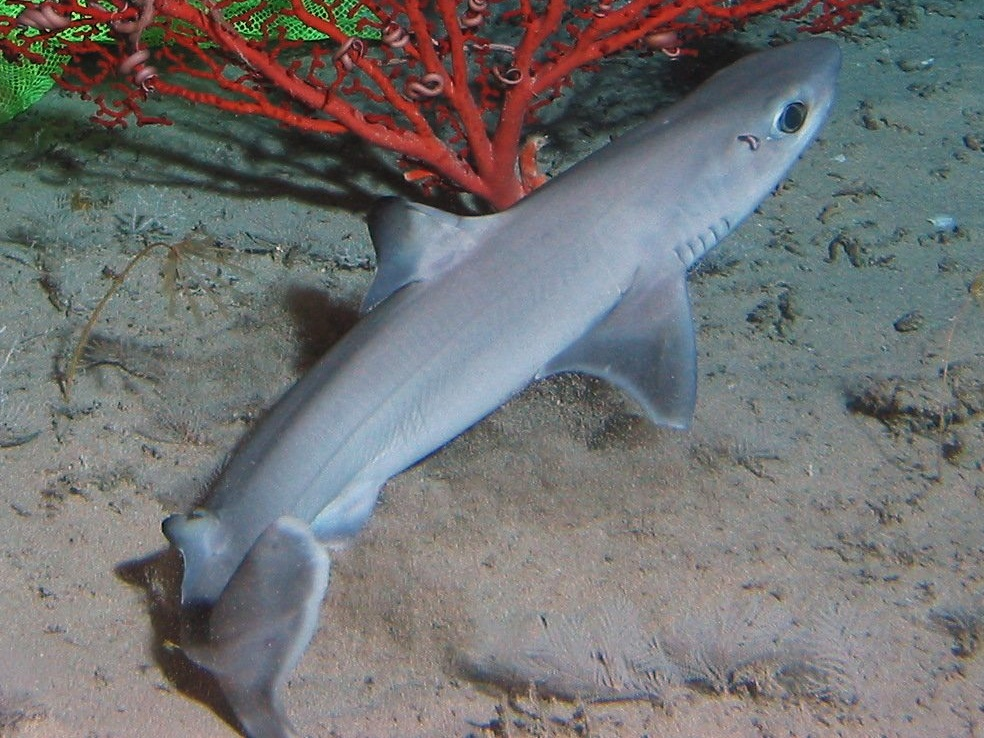

Conservation status
- Least Concern (IUCN 3.1)

Scientific classification
- Kingdom: Animalia
- Phylum: Chordata
- Class: Chondrichthyes
- Subclass: Elasmobranchii
- Division: Selachii
- Order: Squaliformes
- Family: Squalidae
- Genus: Squalus
- Species: S. cubensis

Binomial name
- Squalus cubensis Howell-Rivero, 1936
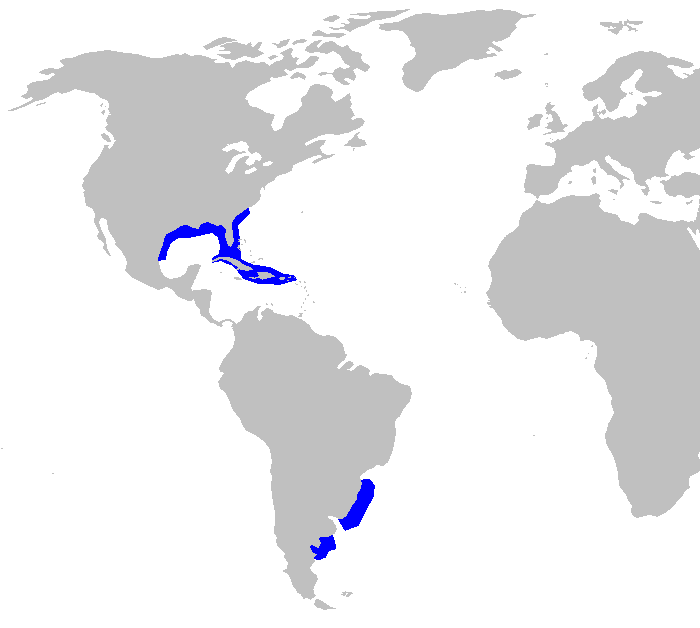
- Range of the Cuban dogfish (in blue)

= Cuban dogfish =

Species of shark

The Cuban dogfish (Squalus cubensis) is a dogfish, a member of the family Squalidae in the order Squaliformes.

== Description ==
The Cuban Dogfish was first discovered by Howell Rivero in 1936 in his publication of Some new, rare and little-known fishes from Cuba.

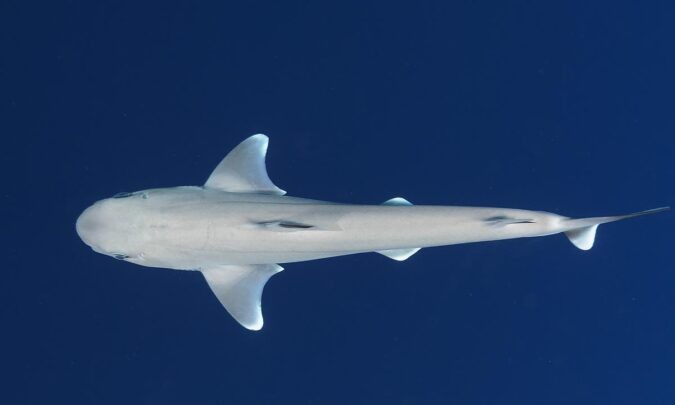
Dorsal view of S. cubensis

This dogfish has a slim grey fusiform body with a short round snout. The pectoral fins are sickle shaped with angular pointed tips. Their two dorsal fins have black tips and have venomous spines protruding out before the fin. Unlike their dorsal fins, their caudal and pelvic fins are white lined. The caudal is the fin attached to their tail. A pelvic fin is located underneath the fish before the anal fin and normally after the pectoral fins. This species exhibits countershading in its coloring. The grey topside side is juxtaposed with a lighter bottom. When viewed from below the lighter scales blend into the surface water. This blending hints at their preferred method of hunting. This species' ancestral heterocercal caudal tail has a longer upper lobe with shortened lower lobe. A quality exhibited in the Galeas, sharks, are dermal denticles. They are a type of scale commonly found on sharks, rays, and skates. These types of scales are like teeth and feel like sandpaper.

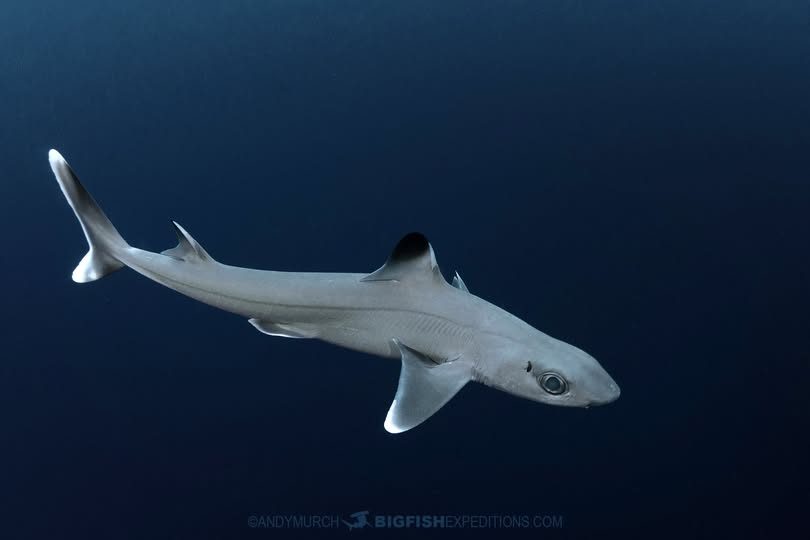
Squalus cubensis

This shark has a slim and elongated body that cuts through water. It's often described as fusiform. The head is conical and depressed but not laterally expanded. This distinct head shape resembles a slightly flattened cone without wide flattened edges. On the sides of their heads large eyes look out into the deep ocean. Their eyes are large relative to their body due to their deep-sea environment. Teeth and mouth placement play an important role for this predator. This predator has evolved into a sub-terminal mouth. A sub-terminal mouth is located on the underside of the body behind the snout. The lower jaw is suspended below the shark's skull and is not visible from above. Their mouths contain poorly differentiated teeth shaped into half-moons with a small single cusp notch.

== Lookalikes ==
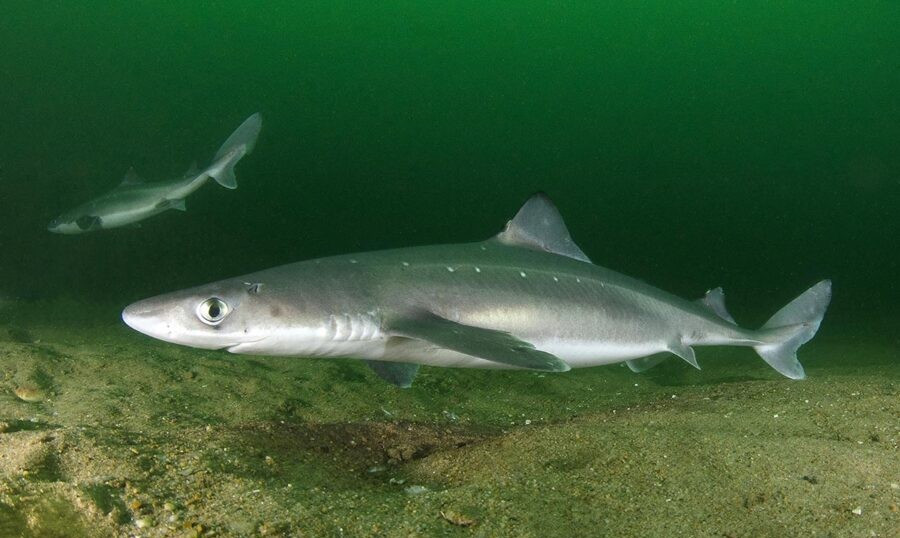
S. acanthias

S. cubensis is often mistaken for other species of dogfish in the Squaliae family. The similarities between Squalus acanthias and S. cubensis create confusion especially their close family classifications. They share similar body plans, spines, ranges, and diets. They share more similarities than differences. However, looking at coloration is the key difference. A. acanthias is brown-grey with white spots down their back. This coloration is unlike S. cubensis, with their grey spot-less coloring. Their similarities to the untrained eye can be invisible considering they are within the same family.

== Venom ==
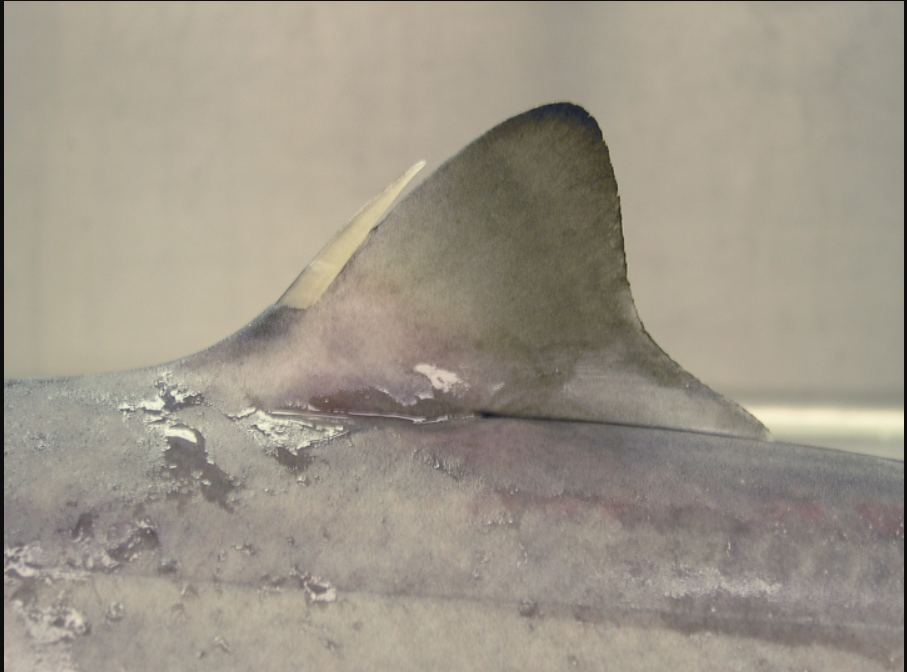
Dorsal spine

An identifying characteristic of the S. cubensis is its venomous spines. The venomous spines originate anteriorly on both dorsal fins. Anteriorly placed means the spines are located before the dorsal fin. These spines are triangular with convex sides and ducts to make them nearly hollow.

They secrete a whiteish venom at the sting site.The venom causes erythema and edema for up to two weeks. Erythema is the reddening of skin due to increased blood flow to the site of injury. This redness is paired with swelling of the skin, or edema. The sting's pain can spread to axilla or groin and cause muscle weakness. The intense pain can last up to six hours without treatment. Research suggests these stings can be fatal at a high enough dose.

== Etymology ==
The word Squalus is derived from the Latin Squalus which means dirty or filthy. This name was given to marine fishes, considered unfit for human consumption, this includes sharks. Cubensis was used as a description of its location, with the addition of the Latin suffix denoting place, -ensis . This fish was originally found in Cuba.

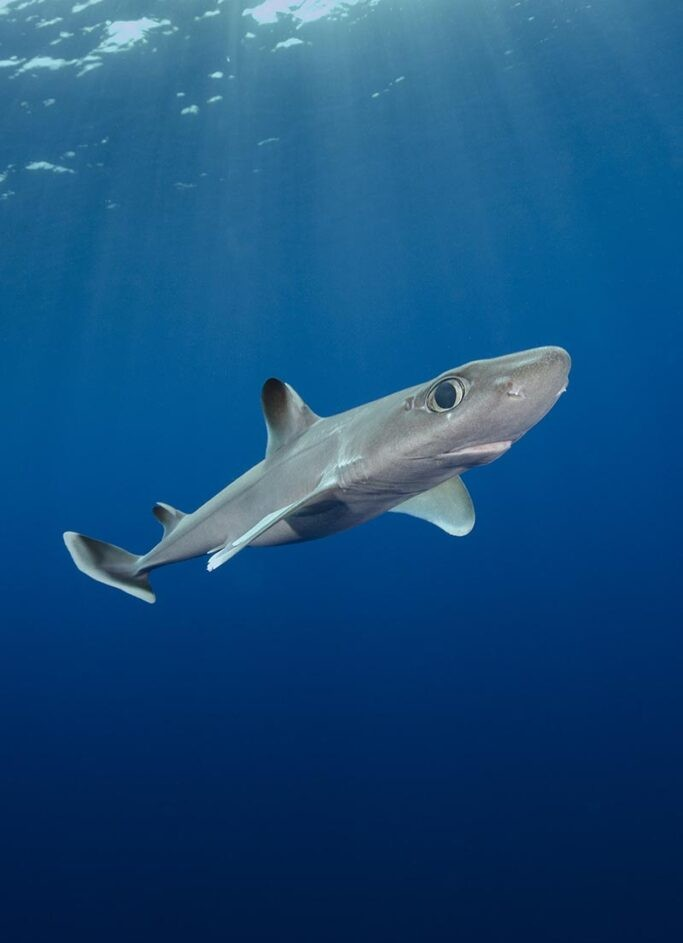
S. cubensis

== Range of Species ==
This species can range from the subtropical Atlantic Ocean to the greater Caribbean and Mexican gulf. Within this range S. cubensis sitings are reported from North Carolina to Florida. Even further south, sitings are reported in Cuba, Hispaniola, southern Brazil and Argentina historically. Recent research has reported a change in historical ranges. Since 2016, S. cubensis has been recorded in Colombian waters.

== Species Habitat ==
The ranges are selected through the S. cubensis preferred habitat. A habitat of dark, deep, and temperate waters near upper continental shelves and upper slopes. These shelves and slopes are essential habitat. These sharks select habitats based on thermal preferences over barometric or photic. This means the water's temperature is prioritized over water's pressure or light penetration. As a result, based on latitude there is a wide variation of preferred depths.

The general location of ranges is selected by factors mentioned previously; however, a deeper location specific look reveals more about their placement in the vast ocean. This species performs social segregation within their water column placements. The segregation is based on maturity and sex. Females are found in shallower water above the males. In the female populations, mature females are in even shallower waters than juveniles. Then for mature males they are found in the deepest waters while juvenile males are in shallower water. The water column is segregated into four levels. The levels are mature females, juvenile females, juvenile males, and mature males from shallowest to deepest waters respectively. This level of segregation is a common behavior among squalids.

In the first level, mature females are found at 198.11m. Second level below the mature females, the female juveniles are at 299.03m. Third level, juvenile males are typically found on average at 340.77m. Fourth level, in the deepest water mature males are recorded at 327.87m.

== Reproduction ==
Long gestation periods and asynchronous breeding are Squalidae family characteristics. The gestation periods are species specific development from embryo to juvenile. This period of time comprises the process of embryo to birth or egg hatching. This species is ovoviviparous, specifically they are lecithotrophic where the embryo carries an individual yolk for nutrition. The embryo will develop inside the female until ready to hatch. This 'hatching' will occur inside the female, and the female will give live birth.

In addition to live births, site association is common among the subclass elasmobranchii. Female S. cubensis will return to their original birth sites for parturition.

== Methods of Aging ==
Methods of aging are either lethal or non-lethal. Location in water column is a non-lethal method to age a specimen. Males can also be aged with their sexual organs, claspers, in addition to water column location. Unfortunately, water column placement is the only non-lethal method of aging for females. Females can be aged with their sexual organs, but it requires surgery.

Body size for juvenile and mature males is an inconsistent aging method. This is because size differences are varied across different habitat ranges. In these ranges a common occurrence is males maturing at smaller sizes than females. Sexual organs on males viable for aging are claspers, rhipidion and siphon sacks. Claspers are scroll shaped organs connected to their pelvic fins. They are used in mating. Calcification of claspers and mobility are measures of maturity. The accumulation of calcium in the claspers will harden the appendage at maturity. This hardening is coupled with opening of rhipidion which matures at the same time. The rhipidion is the skin covering the claspers and at maturity should be able to splay. In addition, claspers should rotate 180 degrees at the base and siphon sacs need to be functional. Siphon sacs are organs used to propel sperm into a female's reproductive tract. The siphon sacs are only externally visible during mating.

Juvenile and mature females can be differentiated through sexual organs and placement in the water column. Sexual organs are a lethal method since they are not externally visible. In female S. cubensis, there are four stages of maturation. They are juvenile, ovulating, gravid, and post-partum. Juveniles will have underdeveloped ovaries with translucent oocytes. Oocytes are egg cells housed in ovaries. Ovulating females have fully developed yellow oocytes with a well-defined uterus. Gravid females will have embryos present in uteri. A post-partum female will have highly vascularized, developed, flaccid and empty uteri.

== Diet ==
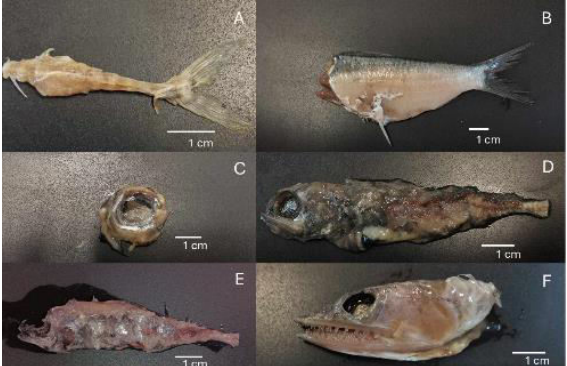
Partially digested food from S. cubensis

The S. cubensis diet consists primarily of teleost fish, crustaceans, mollusks, and algae. In the southern Gulf of Mexico, over half their diets consist of the fish family Scombridae and Penaeidae and Actinopterygii.

Recorded feeding behaviors between males and females suggests little variability. Female and male diets are made up of Scombridae, Penaeidae, and Actinopterygii. The size difference between males and females are negligible on their diets. Their diets will increase throughout time. This means over time prey will move up from lower to higher tropic level prey. As a result, juveniles will occasionally scavenge for food.

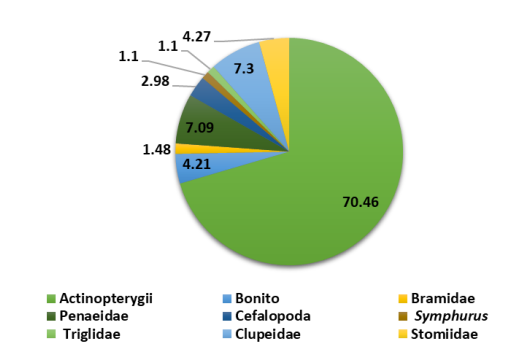
Prey consumed by S. cubensis' ranging from 51.1- 5.5cm

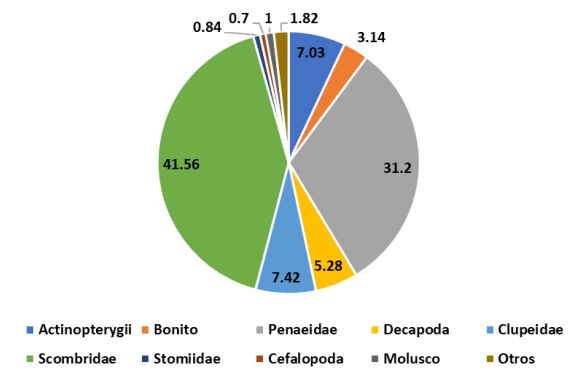
Prey consumed by S. cubensis' ranging from 41.1- 46cm

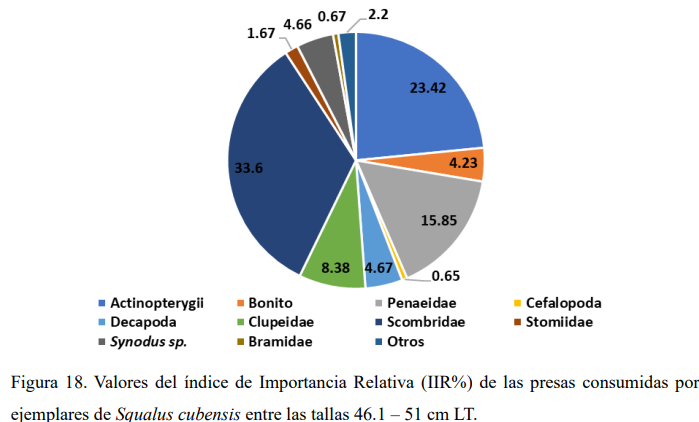
Prey consumed by S. cubensis' ranging from 46.1-51cm

Hunting behaviors are periodic. The S. cubensis are intermittent feeders. This means they will have active feeding periods followed by passive feeding periods In addition to their hunting periods and behaviors, their method of hunting involves vision and sensory organs. These sensory organs are called ampullae of Lorenzini. They are a series of pores sensitive to electrical fields. These fields inform the S. cubensis where prey is located. These fish use eyesight and sensory pores to find and hunt prey.

== Parasites ==
The S. cubensis has a history of spiracle and intestinal parasites. Spiracles are openings near their eyes to allow water into their respiratory system. Over 75% of S. cubensis are infected with some form of parasitic infection. This is due to their deep-water habitats which have low temperatures, little sunlight or oxygen. These harsh conditions create high competition among parasites. As a result, these sharks are faced with a high volume of infections. The parasites are mainly Cestoda, Nematoda, and Acanthocephala species. Cestoda are a ribbon like tapeworm. Nematoda or nematodes are worms like animals. Acanthocephala are endoparasitic worms with thorny or spiny heads and inhabit the intestinal tracks of their hosts.

== Conservation Status ==
This species is currently assessed as "Least Concern" by the IUCN based on the positive population increase researched. There is also no evidence to list the population of cubensis as endangered.

== Threats to Species ==
The lack of certainty surrounding this fish creates concern. The biggest concern is the discrepancy between brood sizes, since there are no estimates of maximum longevity or age at maturity available.

This is better observed if their life history follows a similar species' like, Shortnose Spurdog. These spurdogs reach same maximum adult size. The female-specific estimate of 32 years as the maximum age and 15 years as the halfway maturity point and has a biennial reproductive cycle for this example. If the two different brood estimations are applied to this "life cycle" a brood size of 4 has a total lifetime fecundity of 32. While a brood size of 26 has a fecundity of 208. This poses a large ecological issue from a conservation standpoint if fecundity is between 26 and 208.

The average brood size of 2.2 suggests the smallest within the genus. This means they have the lowest potential for population increase.

There is a lack of information and like many species, cubensis is under researched and records are primarily through industrial fishery studies and experimental trawl surveys. Many sharks are either targeted or incidentally caught in artisanal fisheries with an amalgamation of passive or active methods. Elasmobranch catches have declined but, so has research and accurate catch reporting. This decline implies total fish mortality as under reported and the threat goes undetected.

== Fisheries & Industries ==
While not endangered this dogfish is readily consumed and its byproducts sold off. Shark fisheries use electric reels and fish traps. While other traps like vertical or hand lines in pelagic longline fisheries catch these dogfishes as bycatch.

The shark bycatch is sold for shark fin consumption. Fins aside, their livers are targets for exploitation in the cosmetic, dietary, and medicine industry.

The cosmetic and dietary industry uses Squalene in commercial products derived from the dogfish liver. Their liver is used in the medical industry as an antiangiogenic and antimicrobial product. This product, Squalamine, is in trial for macular degeneration, retinopathy, Parkinson, Alzheimer's, and various cancers.

== Gallery ==
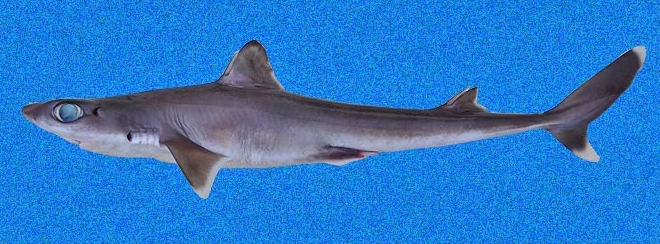
Body

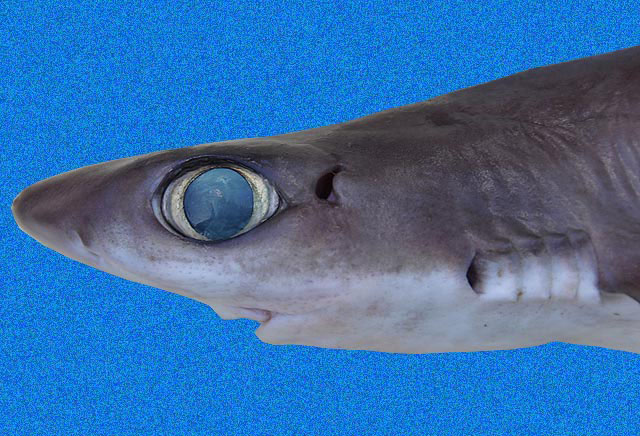
Head

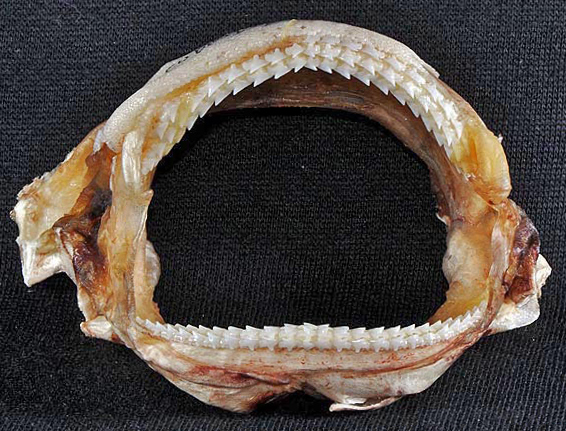
Jaws

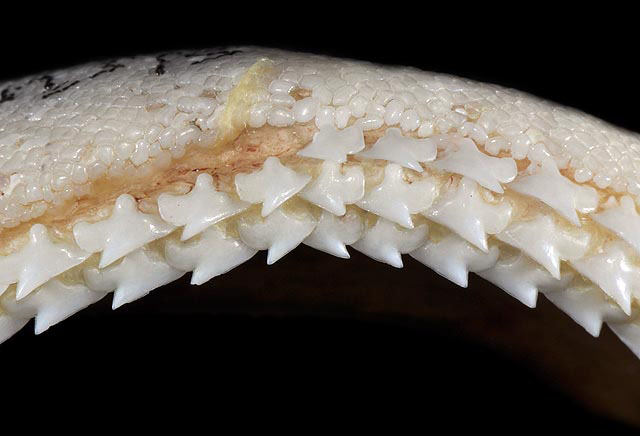
Upper teeth

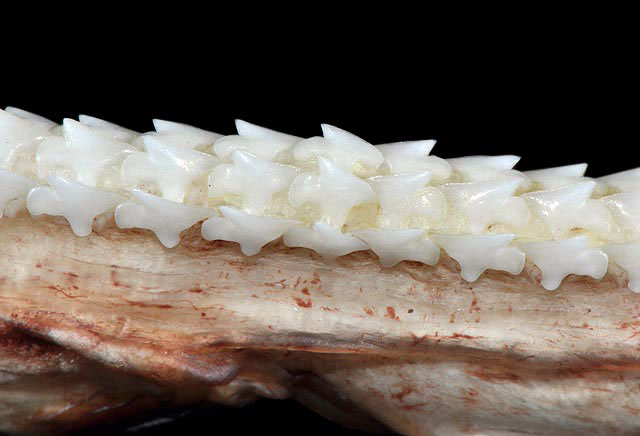
Lower teeth

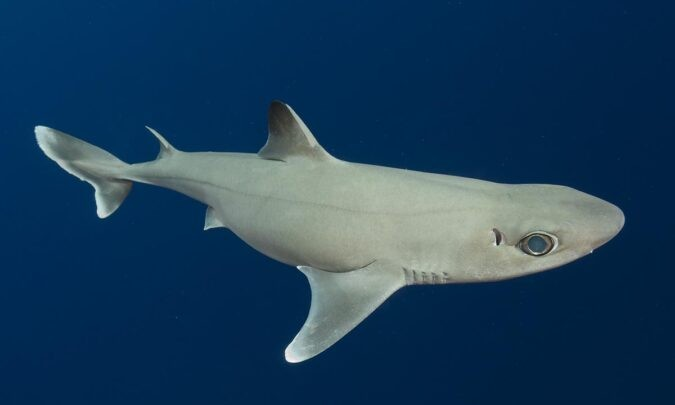
Close side view of S. cubensis

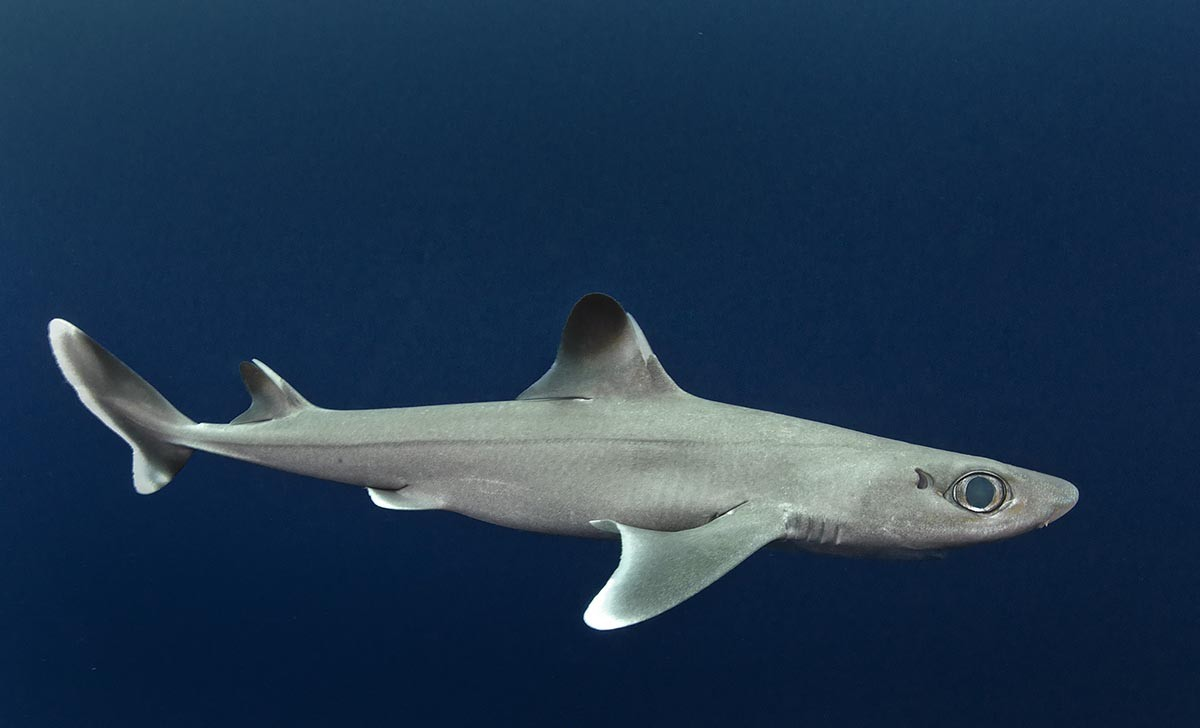
Side view of S. cubensis
