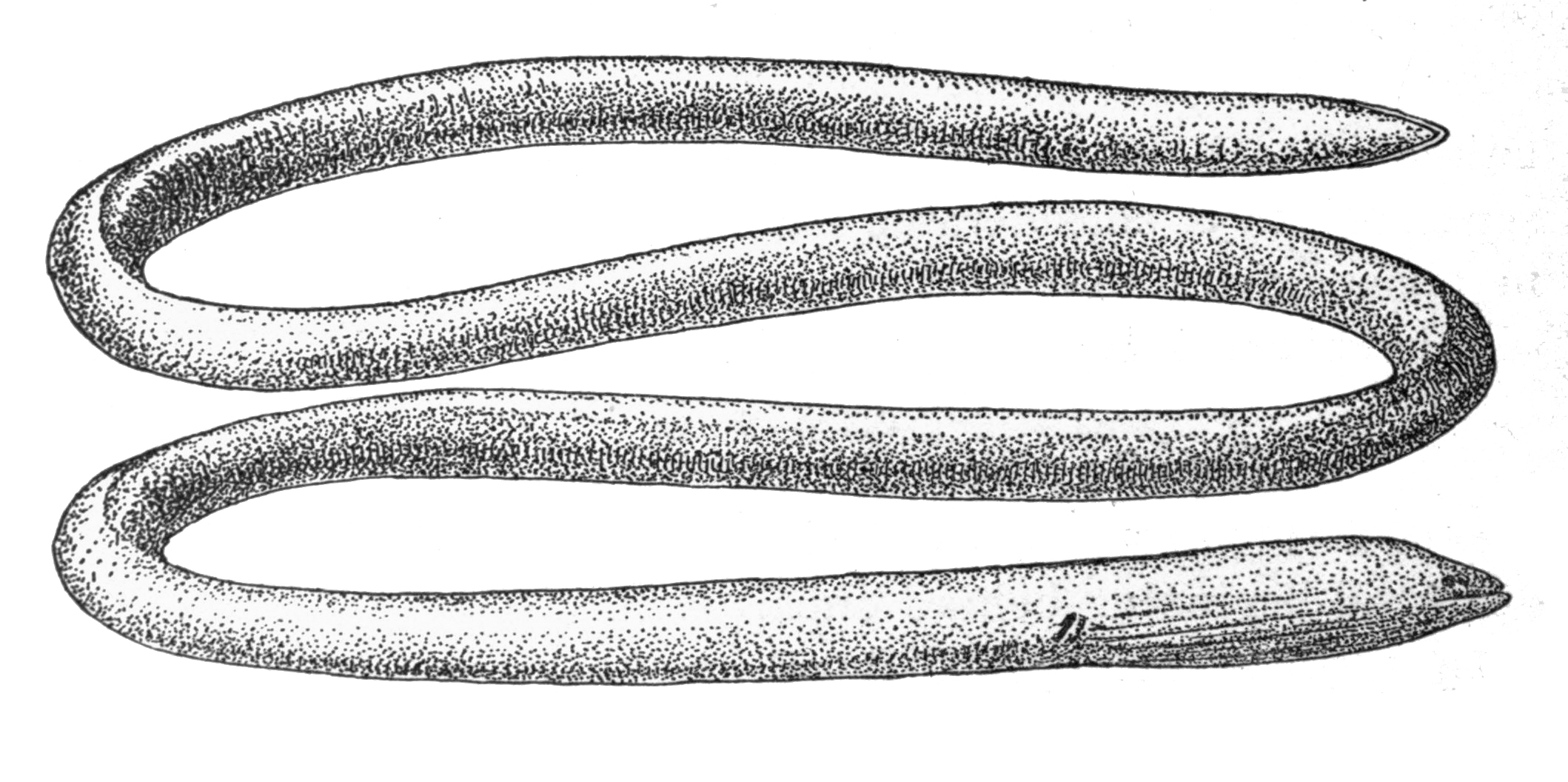

Scientific classification
- Domain: Eukaryota
- Kingdom: Animalia
- Phylum: Chordata
- Class: Actinopterygii
- Order: Anguilliformes
- Family: Moringuidae
- Genus: Moringua
- Species: M. javanica

Binomial name
- Moringua javanica (Kaup, 1856)

Synonyms
- Aphthalmichthys javanicus Kaup, 1856

= Java spaghetti eel =

Species of fish

The Java spaghetti eel, also known as the Java thrush-eel, Java worm eel, and the black-tailed thrush eel (Moringua javanica) is an eel in the family Moringuidae (spaghetti/worm eels). It was described by Johann Jakob Kaup in 1856, originally under the genus Aphthalmichthys. It is a tropical, marine eel which is known from the Indo-Pacific, including East Africa, the Tuamoto Islands, the Ryukyu Islands, and Micronesia. It is a burrowing species which inhabits reefs at a depth range of 2–15 m. Males can reach a maximum total length of 120 cm.
