= Florea sinuata =

Scientific classification
- Domain: Eukaryota
- Kingdom: Animalia
- Phylum: Arthropoda
- Subphylum: Myriapoda
- Class: Diplopoda
- Order: Callipodida
- Family: Tynommatidae
- Tribe: Diactidini
- Genus: Florea; Shelley, 1996
- Species: F. sinuata

Binomial name
- Florea sinuata Shelley, 1996

Species of millipede

Florea is a genus of crested millipedes in the family Tynommatidae. There is one described species, Florea sinuata.
