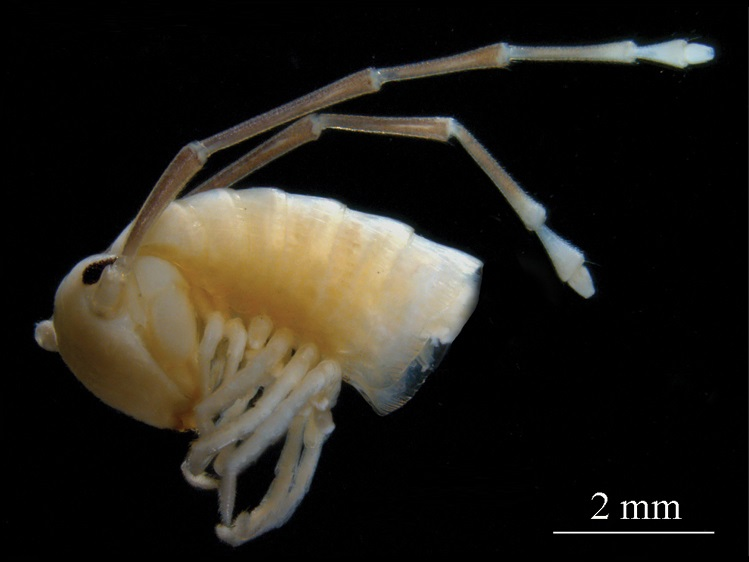
- Head and anterior segments of Sinocallipus deharvengi

Scientific classification
- Domain: Eukaryota
- Kingdom: Animalia
- Phylum: Arthropoda
- Subphylum: Myriapoda
- Class: Diplopoda
- Order: Callipodida
- Suborder: Sinocallipodidea; Shear, 2000
- Family: Sinocallipodidae; Zhang, 1993
- Genus: Sinocallipus; Zhang, 1993

Type species
- Sinocallipus simplipodicus Zhang, 1993

Species
- See text
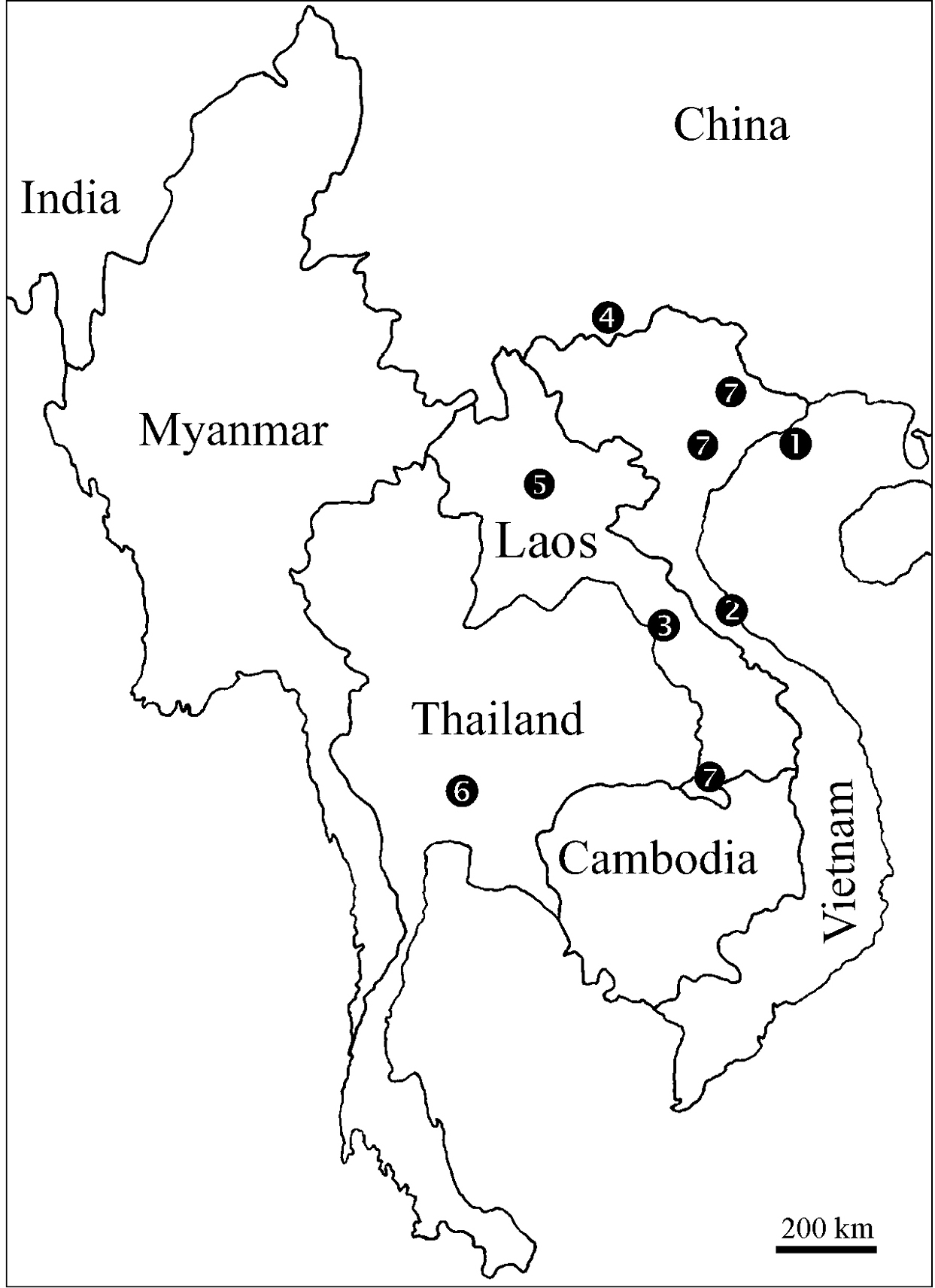
- Distribution of Sinocallipus species (click to view legend)

= Sinocallipus =

Genus of millipedes

Sinocallipus is a genus of predominantly cave-dwelling millipedes in the order Callipodida. Five of the six known species are found in limestone caves on the Indochinese Peninsula from Vietnam to southern China, and it is the only callipodidan genus entirely confined to the tropics. Individuals range from 40–70 mm (1.6–2.8 in) long and possess 55 to 70 segments. Sinocallipus is the sole taxon of the callipodidan suborder Sinocallipodidea, and thought to be the most primitive and sister group to all other callipodidans. In contrast to many other millipede groups, the gonopods (reproductive legs) of Sinocallipus show little variation between species, while other characters such as color, size, and other body parts differ more noticeably between species.

== Species ==
All species except S. thai have been collected solely from caves, and show troglomorphic (cave-adapted) traits such as pale coloration, long antennae, and long legs. S. jaegeri and S. simplipodicus show reduced eyes, consisting of only 10 to 16 colorless ocelli each, while the other species have 33 to 50 black ocelli. S. thai is unique for its dark coloration and terrestrial habitat, and correspondingly has the most ocelli and shortest antennae.

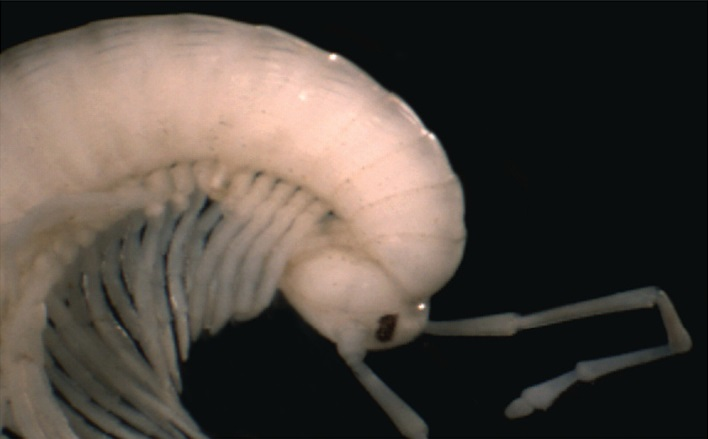
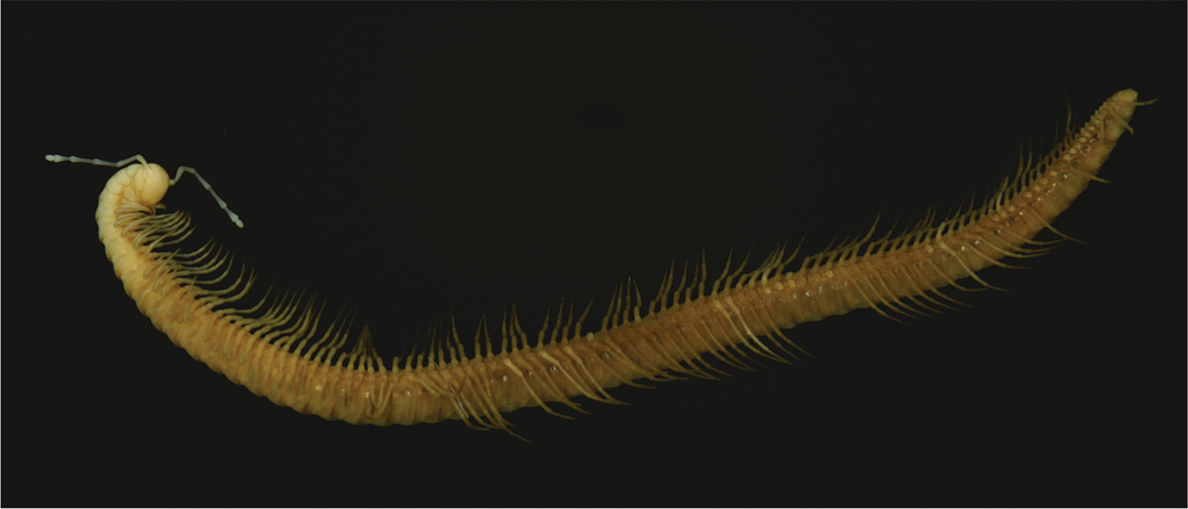
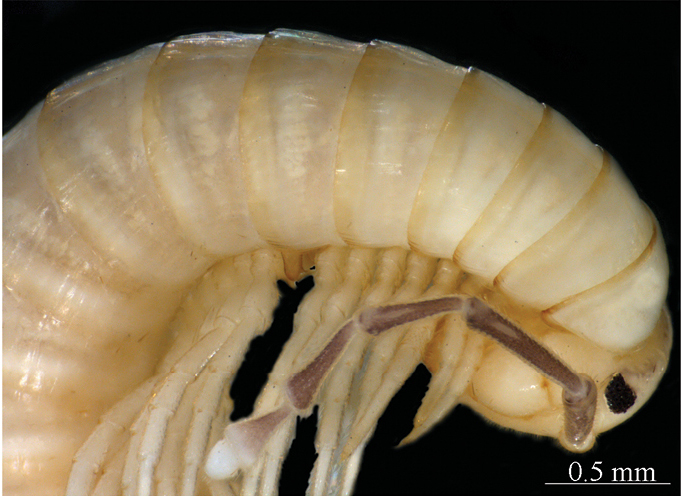
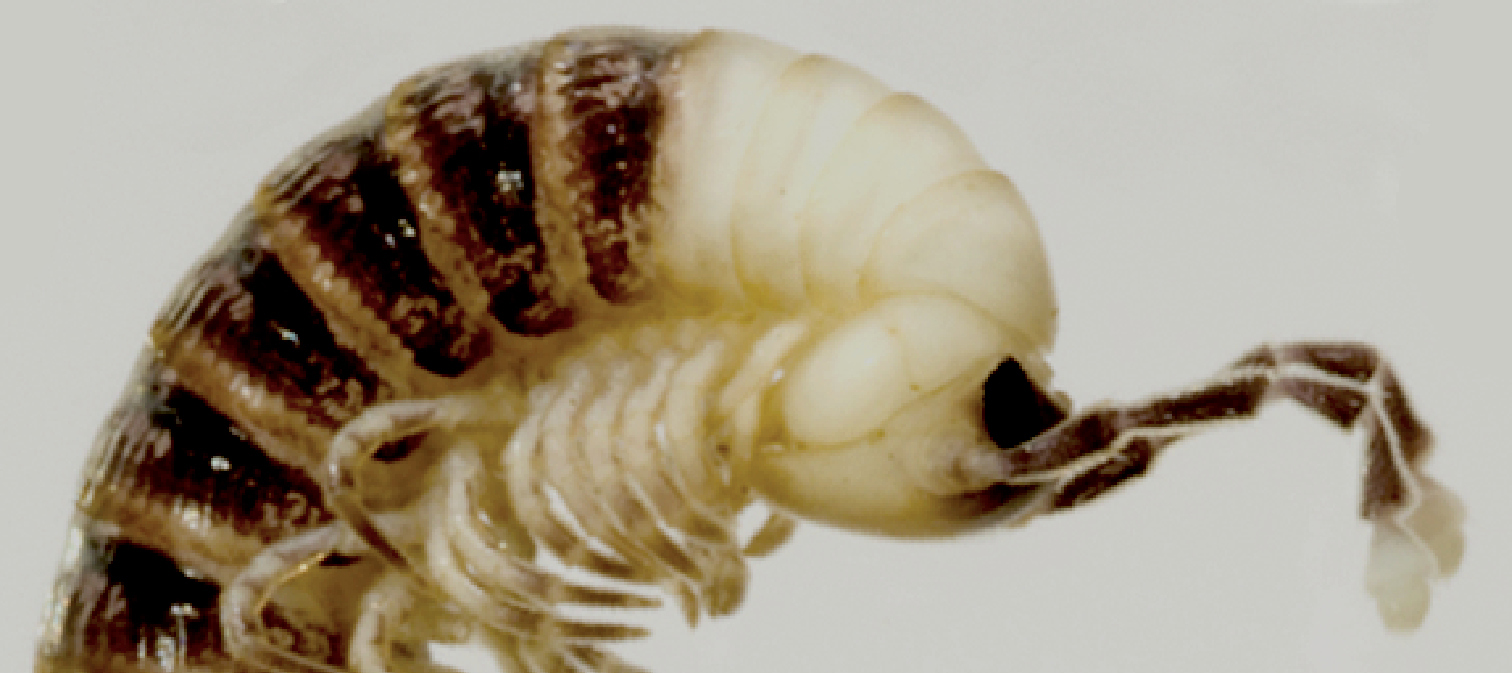
| Species | Distribution | Notes | Image |
|---|---|---|---|
| Sinocallipus catba Stoev & Enghoff, 2011 | Vietnam, Hai Phong Province | Pale yellow body with light brown antennae. |
| Sinocallipus deharvengi Stoev & Enghoff, 2011 | Vietnam, Quảng Bình Province | Very long antennae reach past 10th body segment |
| Sinocallipus jaegeri Stoev & Enghoff, 2011 | Laos, Khammouane Province | Eyes inconspicuous and transparent |
| Sinocallipus simplipodicus Zhang, 1993 | China, Yunnan Province | Reduced eyes |
| Sinocallipus steineri Stoev & Enghoff, 2011 | Laos, Luang Prabang Province |
| Sinocallipus thai Stoev, Enghoff, Panha & Fuangarworn, 2007 | Thailand, Saraburi Province | Dark brown body with contrasting white anterior segments and antenna tips |

== See also ==
- Troglofauna
- List of troglobites
