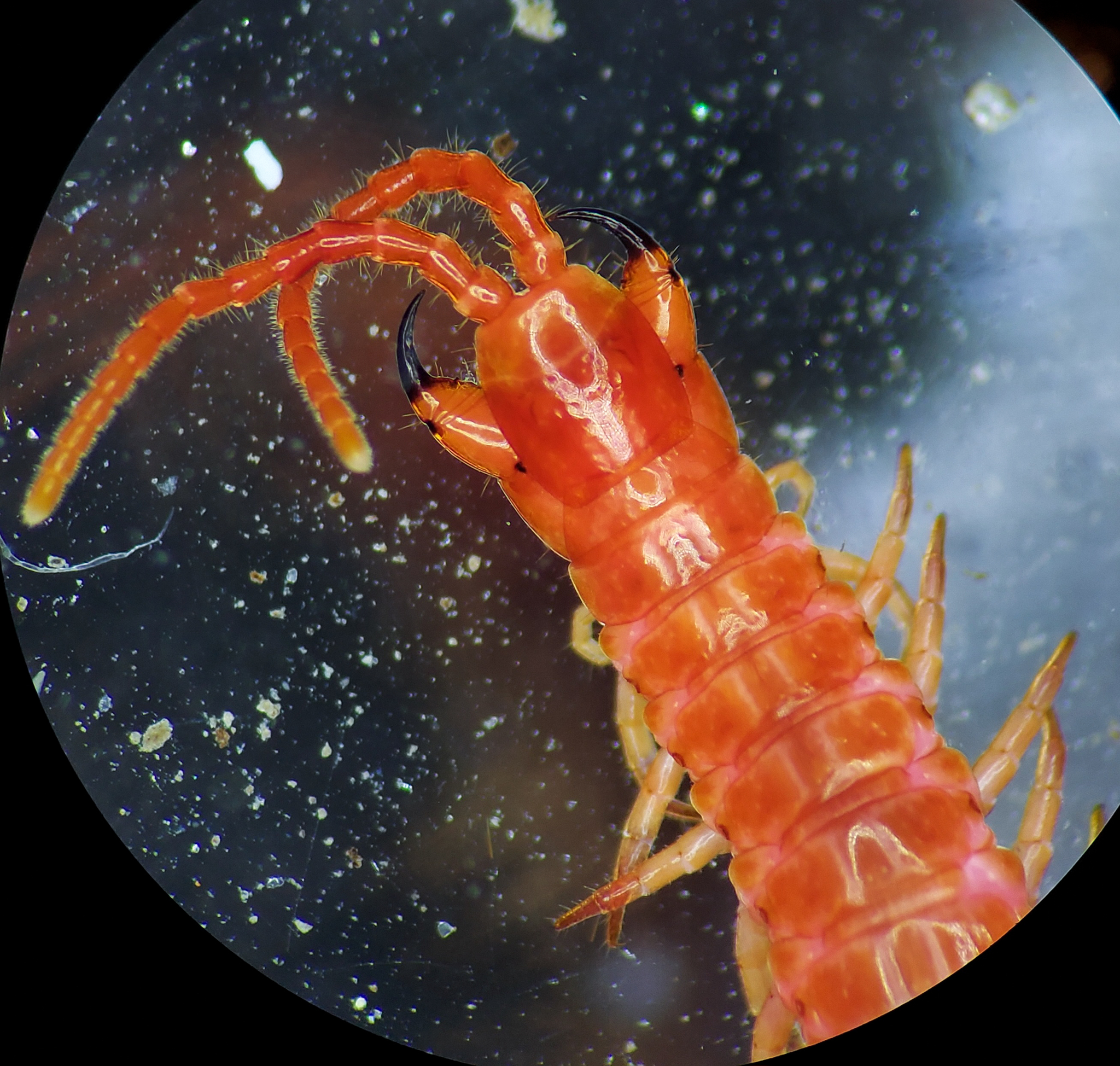

Scientific classification
- Kingdom: Animalia
- Phylum: Arthropoda
- Subphylum: Myriapoda
- Class: Chilopoda
- Order: Geophilomorpha
- Family: Geophilidae
- Genus: Geophilus
- Species: G. ampyx

Binomial name
- Geophilus ampyx Crabill, 1954

= Geophilus ampyx =

Species of soil centipede

Geophilus ampyx is a species of soil centipede in the family Geophilidae found in North America, especially South Carolina.

== Description ==
Geophilus ampyx grows to 52 millimeters in length, though it averages 30–40, has 49–53 leg pairs in males and 51–55 in females, and is bright red in color. It also bears five sclerotized and deeply pigmented labral teeth and a nearly entirely exposed prebasal plate. It can be confused with G. mordax, though it can be differentiated by the absence of sacculi.
