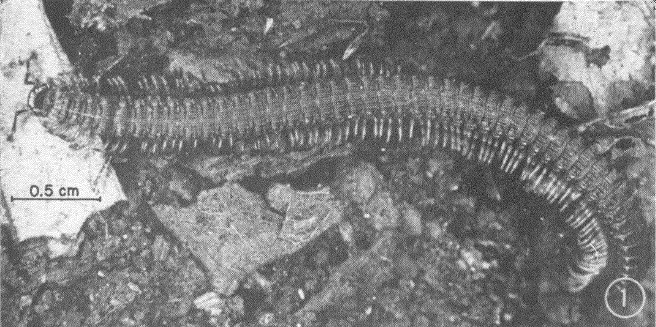

Scientific classification
- Kingdom: Animalia
- Phylum: Arthropoda
- Subphylum: Myriapoda
- Class: Diplopoda
- Order: Callipodida
- Family: Abacionidae; Shelley, 1979

= Abacionidae =

Family of millipedes

Abacionidae is a family of crested millipedes belonging to the order Callipodida. The family includes at least three genera and about 13 described species in Abacionidae.

== Genera ==
- Abacion Rafinesque, 1820
- Delophon Chamberlin, 1943
- Tetracion Hoffman, 1956
