= Luis Howell-Rivero =

Luis Hugo Howell-Rivero (December 28, 1899, Havana - October 7, 1986, Florida Keys) was a Cuban biologist and anthropologist. In the 1920s and 1930s he identified numerous new species of animals, especially fish, in Cuba and the rest of the Caribbean. One example is Squalus cubensis, the Cuban dogfish. He helped establish institutions for the study of biology and botany throughout Central and South America and later in life became an expert for UNESCO.

== Taxa described by Howell-Rivero ==
- See Category:Taxa named by Luis Howell-Rivero
