= Charles Harvey Bollman =

American naturalist (1868–1889)

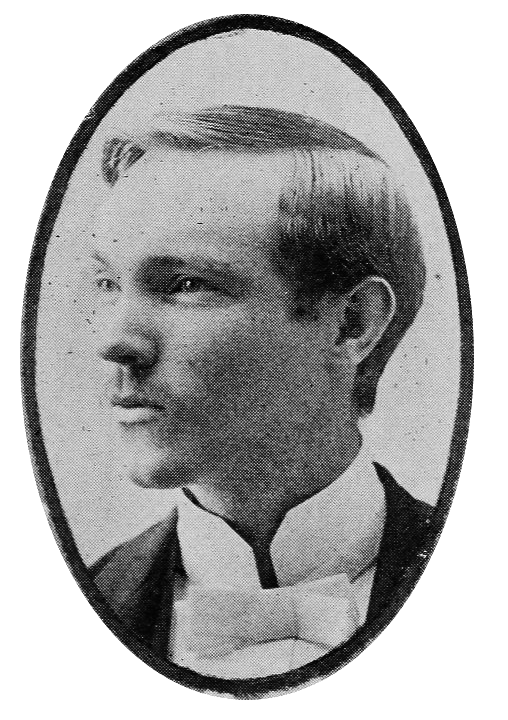
- Born: December 24, 1868; Monongahela, Pennsylvania, US
- Died: July 13, 1889 (aged 20); Waycross, Georgia, US
- Education: Indiana University Bloomington
- Known for: Studies on fishes and myriapods
- Scientific career
- Fields: Biology
- Institutions: U.S. Fish Commission
- Academic advisors: John Casper Branner; David Starr Jordan

Charles Harvey Bollman (1868–1889) was an American naturalist who published on fishes and myriapods, becoming known internationally for his work in a short career before dying at the age of 20, considered by David Starr Jordan one of the most brilliant and promising naturalists he had ever known.

Bollman was born in Monongahela, Pennsylvania, December 24, 1868. He attended the Indiana University at Bloomington where he studied under John C. Branner and David Starr Jordan. Bollman was a founding member of the university's Independent Literary Society. He graduated in June 1889 and was appointed immediately after as an assistant in the United States Fish Commission, and died of dysentery contracted while collecting fish in the Okefenokee Swamp of Waycross, Georgia, on July 13. He was the only 19th-century ichthyologist to enter the Okefenokee.

Bollman published thirteen papers between the years of 1887 and 1889, including papers co-authored with Jordan. Of myriapods, he described 65 new species in North America. J. S. Kingsley considered him "one of our best students of the Myriapoda", and he was considered by biologist Ralph Crabill "the most brilliant chilopod systematist of this country in the 19th century". His collection of myriapods is housed in the National Museum of Natural History.

He was posthumously commemorated by Jordan in the name of the goby genus Bollmannia, by C. H. Gilbert in the fish Opsopoeodus bollmani, and by Filippo Silvestri, who named the millipede genus Bollmania.

== See also ==
- Taxa named by Charles Harvey Bollman
