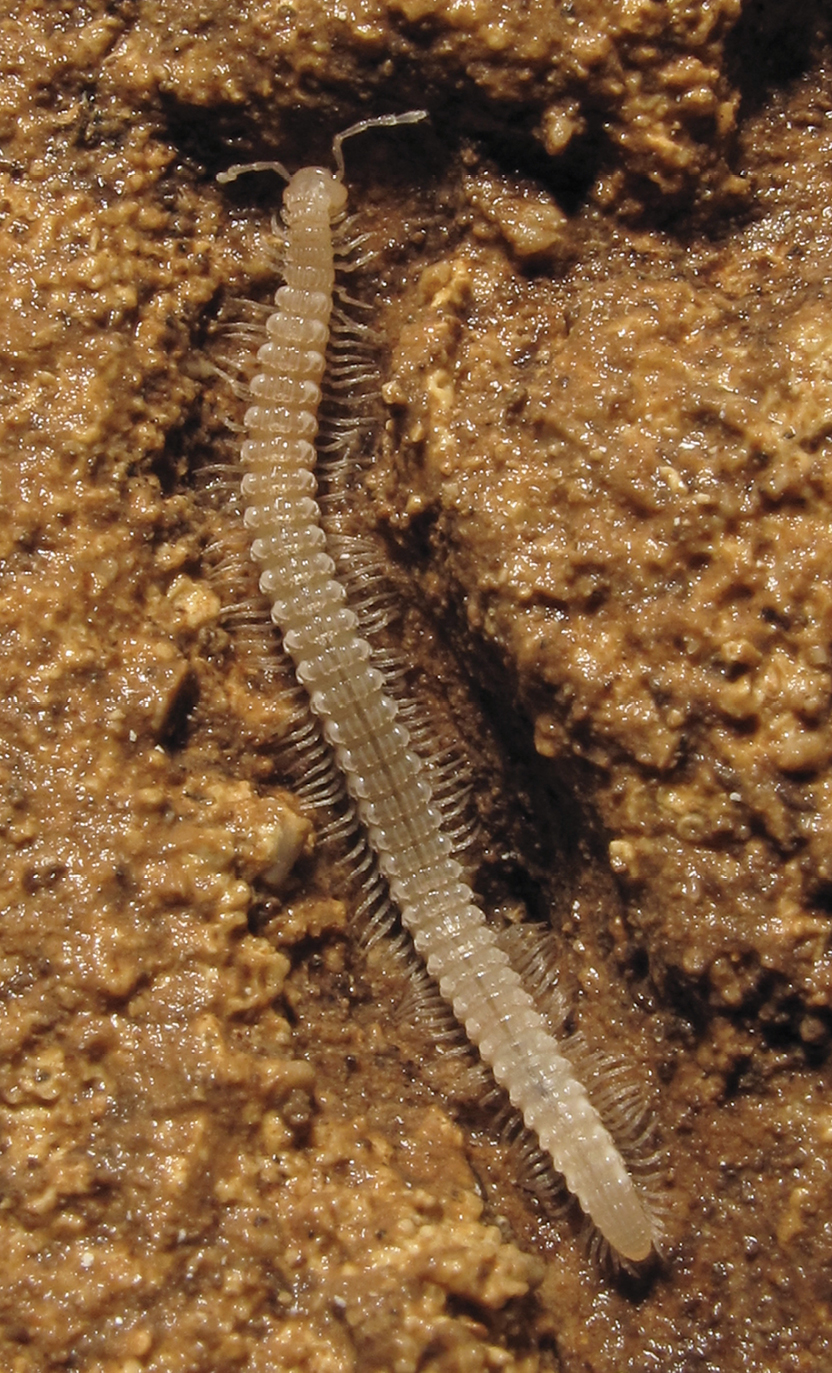
- Tetracion jonesi (Abacionidae), a species from the southern United States

Scientific classification
- Kingdom: Animalia
- Phylum: Arthropoda
- Subphylum: Myriapoda
- Class: Diplopoda
- Superorder: Nematophora
- Order: Callipodida; Pocock, 1894

Suborders
- Callipodidea; Schizopetalidea; Sinocallipodidea; †Burmanopetalidea

Synonyms
- Lysiopetalida Chamberlin, 1943

= Callipodida =

Order of myriapods

Callipodida is an order of millipedes containing around 130 species, many characterized by crests or ridges.

== Description ==
Callipodida are long and narrow millipedes, up to 100 millimetres (3.9 in) in length with 40-60 body segments. A dorsal groove is present running down the mid-line of the body, and many species are ornamented with longitudinal crests or ridges. Sexually mature males possess a single pair of gonopods, consisting of the modified anterior leg pair of the 7th body segment, and carried concealed within a pouch.

== Distribution ==
Callipodida occurs in North America, Europe, west Asia, southern China and Southeast Asia.

== Classification ==
The living (extant) Callipodida are classified into three suborders, seven families, and approximately 130 species. The genus Sinocallipus, which constitutes the suborder Sinocallipodidea, is thought to be the most primitive, and a sister group to all other callipodans. A fourth, extinct, suborder was described in 2019 to accommodate Burmanopetalum inexpectatum, a 99 million-year-old specimen found in Burmese amber.

Suborder Callipodidea

- Callipodidae

Suborder Schizopetalidea

- Abacionidae
- Caspiopetalidae
- Dorypetalidae
- Paracortinidae
- Schizopetalidae

Suborder Sinocallipodidea

- Sinocallipodidae

†Suborder Burmanopetalidea

- †Burmanopetalidae
