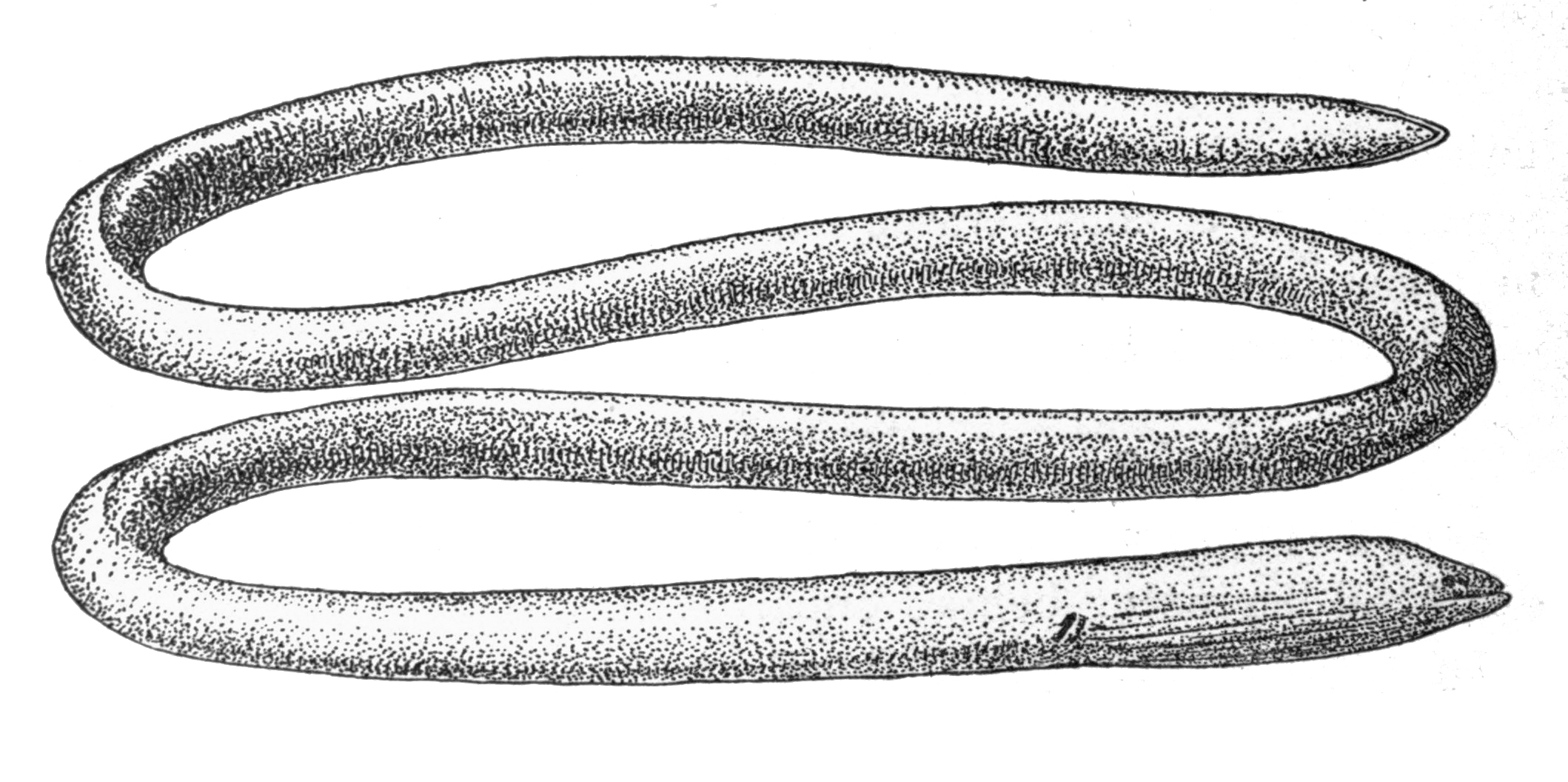
- Moringua javanica

Scientific classification
- Kingdom: Animalia
- Phylum: Chordata
- Class: Actinopterygii
- Order: Anguilliformes
- Suborder: Anguilloidei
- Family: Moringuidae; Gill, 1885

Genera
- see text

= Moringuidae =

Family of fishes

The Moringuidae are a small family of eels commonly known as spaghetti eels or worm eels, although the latter name is also shared with other families of eels.

Moringuid eels are found in shallow tropical waters worldwide. They range from about 15 to 140 cm (5.9 to 55.1 in) to in length, and have very narrow, cylindrical bodies, giving rise to their common name.

The family contains 14 species in its two genera.

== Genera ==
Moringuidae contains the following two genera:

- Moringua Gray, 1831
- Neoconger Girard, 1858
