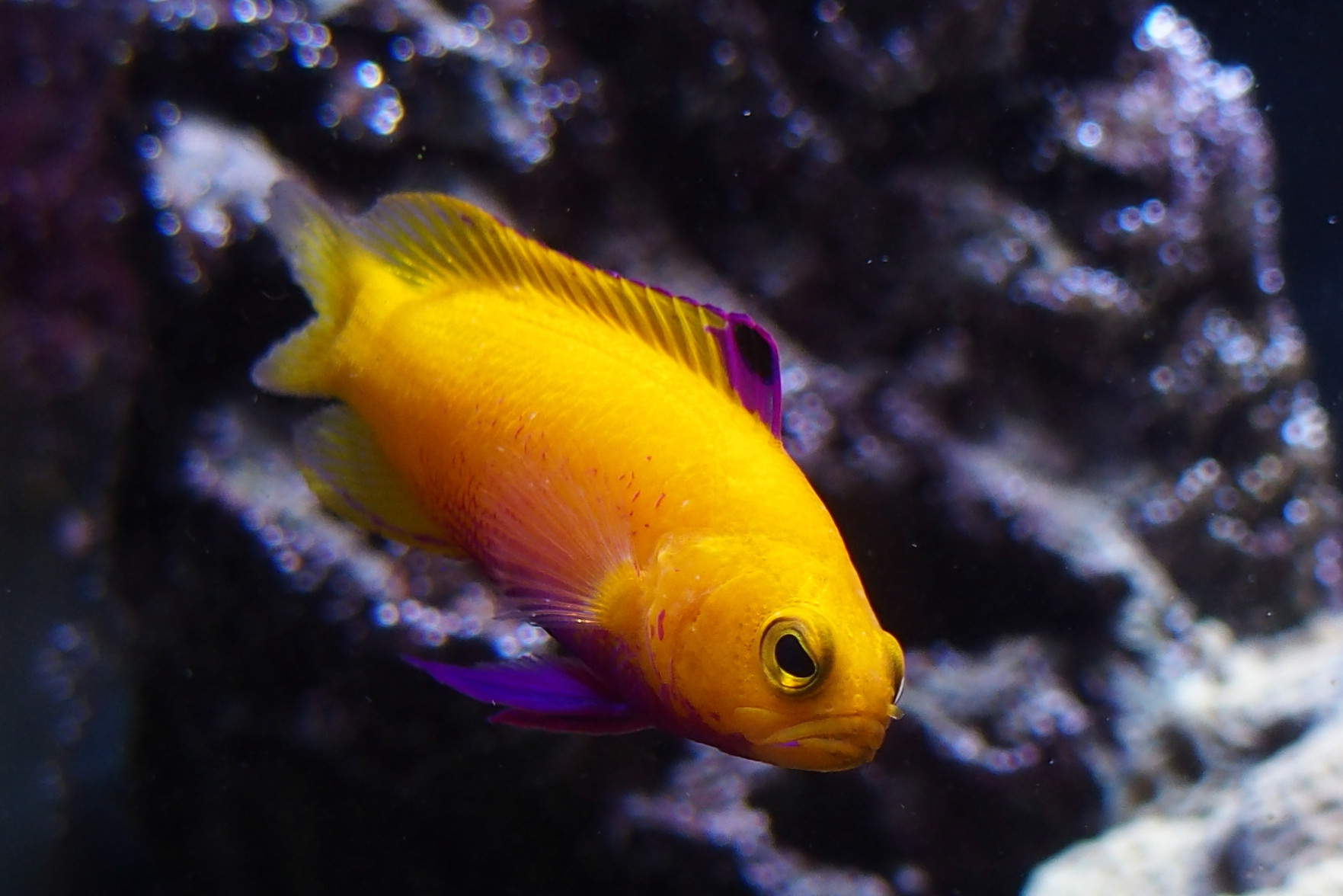
- Golden basslet (G. dejongi)

Conservation status
- Data Deficient (IUCN 3.1)

Scientific classification
- Kingdom: Animalia
- Phylum: Chordata
- Class: Actinopterygii
- Order: Blenniiformes
- Family: Grammatidae
- Genus: Gramma
- Species: G. dejongi

Binomial name
- Gramma dejongi Victor and Randall, 2010

= Gramma dejongi =

Species of fish

Gramma dejongi, the golden basslet, Cuban gramma or golden fairy basslet, is a species of marine ray-finned fish belonging to the family Grammatidae, the gramma basslets. This species is found in reef environments of the tropical waters in the Caribbean Sea.

== Taxonomy ==
Gramma dejongi was first formally described in 2010 by the American fish biologists Benjamin C. Victor and John E. Randall with its type locality given as Sancti Spíritus, off Trinidad, Cuba at 21.7896°N, 80.0579°W, from a depth of around 20 m (66 ft). It is closely related to the more widespread and sympatric Royal gramma (G. loreto) and has similar meristic measurements but it lives in deeper water, never swims upside down and is consistently smaller and different in color pattern, Victor and Randall postulated that it may be an example of sympatric speciation. The genus Gramma is classified in the family Grammatidae, being the type genus of that family. Eschmeyer's Catalog of Fishes classifies the Grammatidae in the order Blenniiformes.

== Etymology ==
Gramma dejongi is classified within the genus Gramma, this name means "line" and is a reference to the broken lateral line running close to the line of the back and broken between the dorsal fin and the caudal peduncle. The specific name honors the Dutch marine aquarium trader Arie De Jong who was the first to recognize this was a potential new species and provided the type specimens.

== Description ==
Gramma dejongi is distinctive among the basslets as having a primary color that is not purple. It is instead primarily golden yellow with purple patches on its fins and a slight path on the belly near the fins. There is also a black spot on the dorsal fin. It is relatively small at about 7 cm (2.8 in), smaller than the Royal gramma.

== Distribution ==
Gramma dejongi is considered to be largely endemic to the waters around southern Cuba. However a solitary individual has been found off the coast of the Little Cayman Island in the Cayman Islands. Whether this represents another population or a displaced individual cannot be confirmed.

== In aquariums ==
Gramma dejongi is popular as an aquarium pet, but due to its recent discovery it has not been as popular as other species. Its temperament is similar to that of the other Gramma species. Of note it is the first basslet to have a distinct color morph bred by enthusiasts, that being the "Platinum" variant, in which the purple coloration is replaced by a white color.
