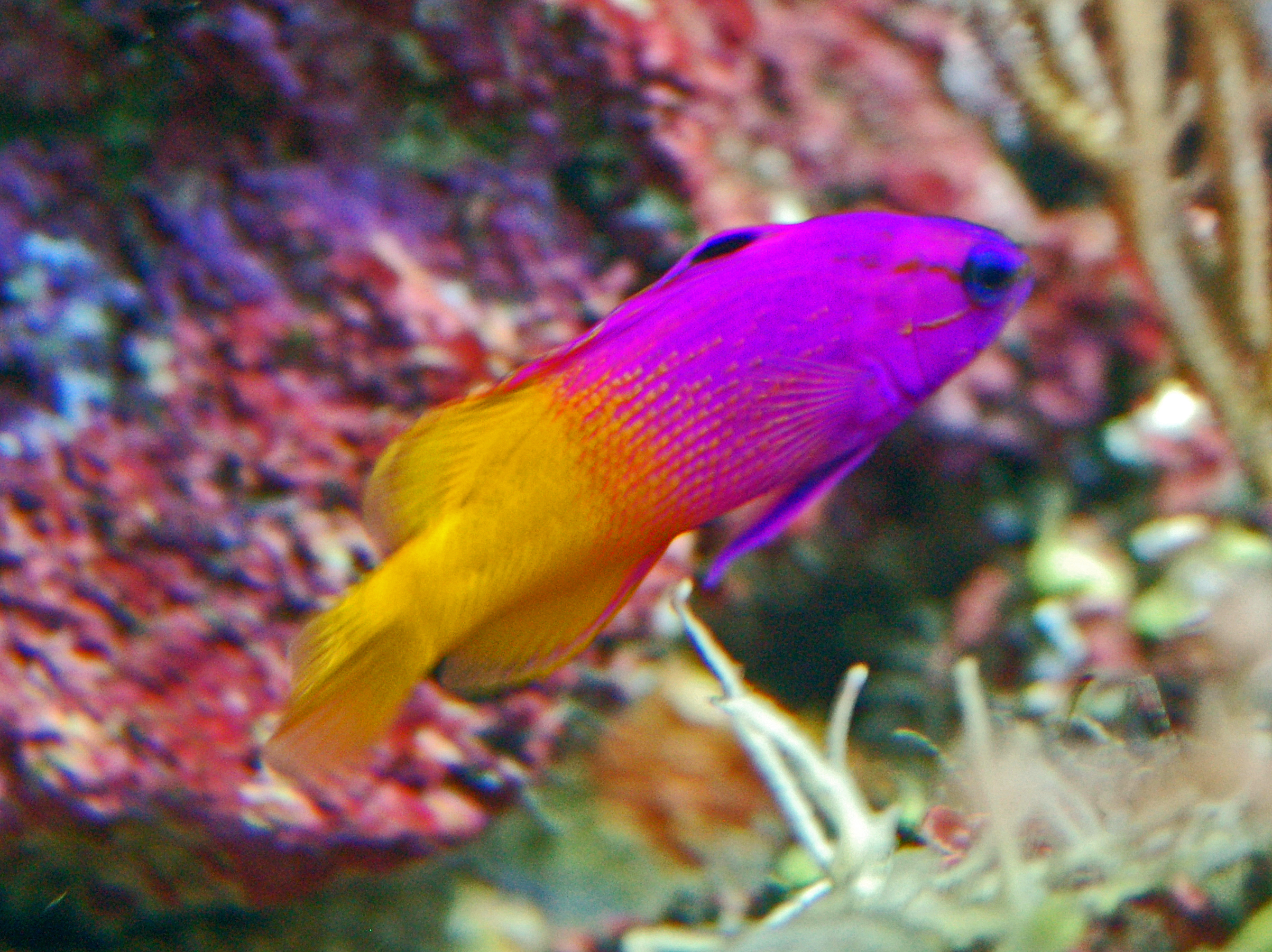
- Royal gramma (G. loreto)

Scientific classification
- Kingdom: Animalia
- Phylum: Chordata
- Class: Actinopterygii
- Order: Blenniiformes
- Family: Grammatidae
- Genus: Gramma; Poey, 1868

Type species
- Gramma loreto Poey, 1868

= Gramma (fish) =

Genus of fishes

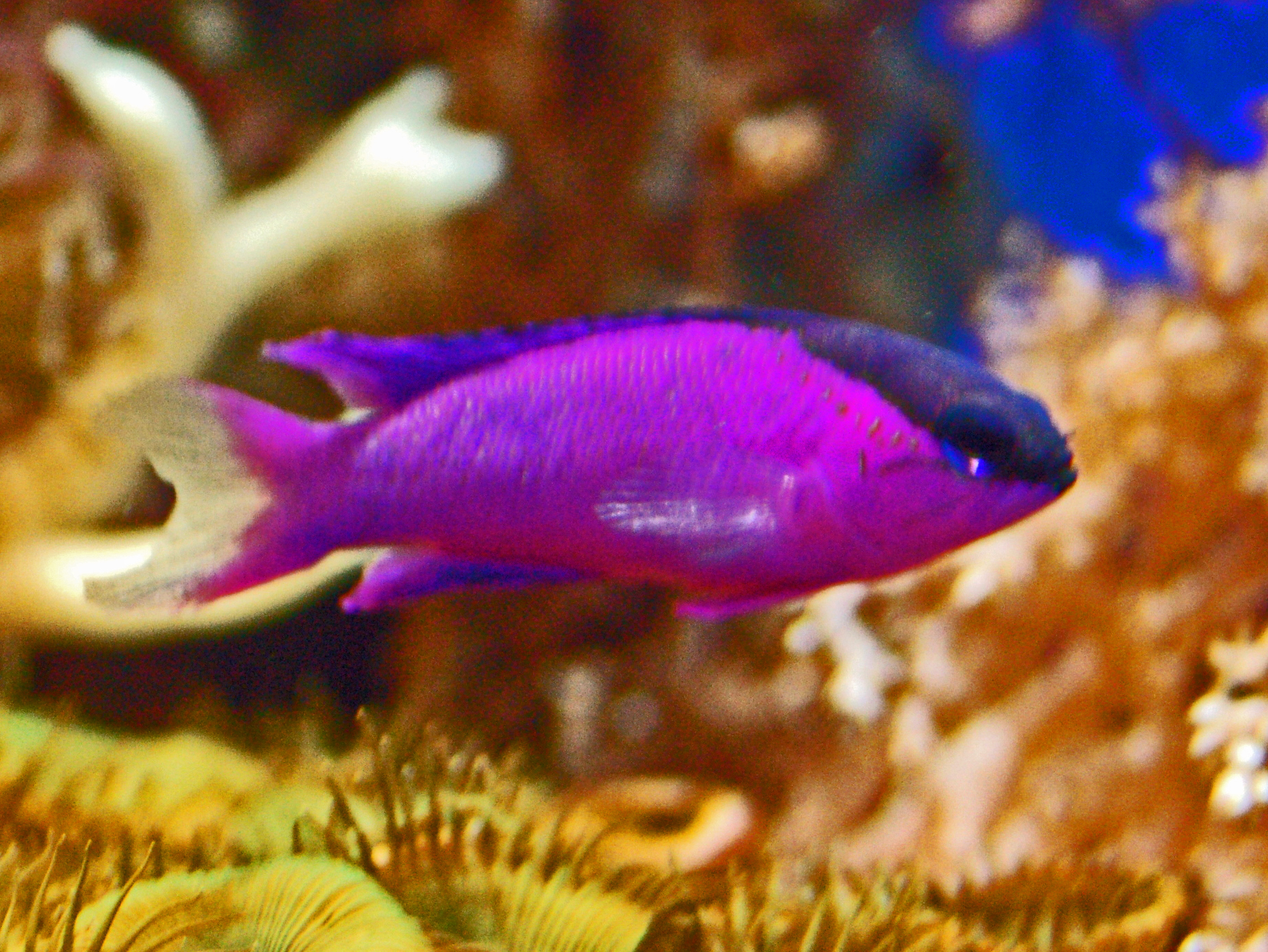
Blackcap basslet (G. melacara)

Gramma is a genus of fishes native to tropical waters of the western Atlantic Ocean and the Caribbean Sea.

== Description ==
Members of the genus Gramma are brightly colored, generally with two different colors. They measure, depending on the species, between 6 and 10 centimetres (2.4 and 3.9 in).

== Species ==
There are currently five recognized species in this genus:

- Gramma brasiliensis I. Sazima (fr), Gasparini & R. L. Moura, 1998 (Brazilian basslet)
- Gramma dejongi Victor & J. E. Randall, 2010 (golden basslet)
- Gramma linki Starck & P. L. Colin, 1978 (yellowlined basslet)
- Gramma loreto Poey, 1868 (royal gramma)
- Gramma melacara J. E. Böhlke & J. E. Randall, 1963 (blackcap basslet)
