= Bothrops sazimai =

Scientific classification
- Kingdom: Animalia
- Phylum: Chordata
- Class: Reptilia
- Order: Squamata
- Suborder: Serpentes
- Family: Viperidae
- Genus: Bothrops
- Species: B. sazimai

Binomial name
- Bothrops sazimai Barbo et al., 2016

Species of snake

Bothrops sazimai, or Franceses Island-lancehead, is a species of pit viper from Franceses Island, Brazil.

== Etymology ==
It is named after Professor Ivan Sazima for his contribution to the study of natural history and conservation of Brazilian fauna, and for his field studies on Bothrops jararaca.

== Description ==
Bothrops sazimai can be distinguished from other Bothrops species by its larger eyes, shorter and higher head, slender body, longer tail, grey/brown colouring, cream-white grey-speckled underbelly and the specific numbers of specific scales.

Bothrops sazimai specifically differs from Bothrops jararaca by its smaller size, longer tail, slender body and larger eyes. It also differs from Bothrops alcatraz, Bothrops insularis and Bothrops otavioi by its larger number of ventral and subcaudal scales. Additionally, it can be distinguished from B. insularis by its colour, smaller size, and smaller head and tail. Conversely, it can be distinguished from B. alcatraz and B. otavioi by its larger size as well as the yellow tip on juveniles' tails.

== Diet ==
Bothrops sazimai is known to eat nocturnal prey such as frogs, lizards (Gymnodactylus darwinii and tropical house geckos), centipedes (Scolopendromorpha) and sometimes other snakes.
