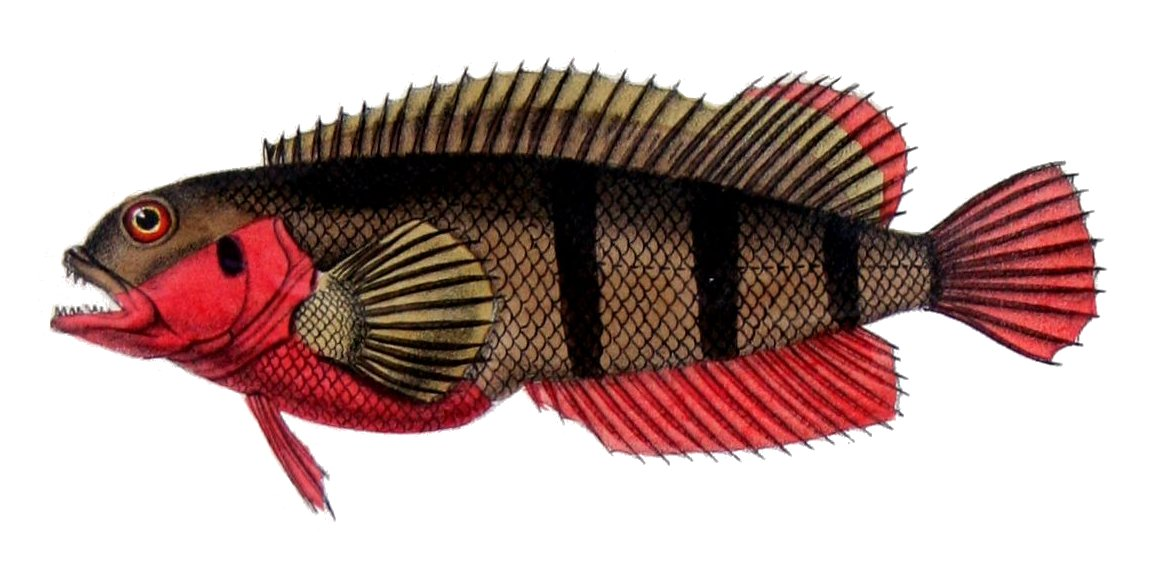
- Labrisomus nuchipinnis

Scientific classification
- Kingdom: Animalia
- Phylum: Chordata
- Class: Actinopterygii
- Order: Blenniiformes
- Family: Labrisomidae
- Genus: Labrisomus; Swainson, 1839

Type species
- Clinus pectinifer Valenciennes, 1836

Synonyms
- Lepisoma DeKay, 1842; Acteis D. S. Jordan, 1904; Ericteis D. S. Jordan, 1904; Somersia Beebe & Tee-Van, 1934; Odontoclinus Reid, 1935; Ctenichthys Howell Rivero, 1936

= Labrisomus =

Genus of fishes

Labrisomus is a genus of labrisomid blennies native to the western Atlantic ocean and the eastern Pacific Ocean.

== Species ==
There are currently 11 recognized species in this genus:

- Labrisomus conditus I. Sazima (fr), Carvalho-Filho, Gasparini & C. Sazima, 2009 (Masquerader hairy blenny)
- Labrisomus cricota I. Sazima (fr), Gasparini & R. L. Moura, 2002 (Mock blenny)
- Labrisomus fernandezianus (Guichenot, 1848)
- Labrisomus jenkinsi (Heller & Snodgrass, 1903) (Jenkins' blenny)
- Labrisomus multiporosus C. Hubbs, 1953 (Porehead blenny)
- Labrisomus nuchipinnis (Quoy & Gaimard, 1824) (Hairy blenny)
- Labrisomus philippii (Steindachner, 1866) (Chalapo clinid)
- Labrisomus pomaspilus V. G. Springer & Rosenblatt, 1965
- Labrisomus socorroensis C. Hubbs, 1953 (Misspelled blenny)
- Labrisomus wigginsi C. Hubbs, 1953 (Baja blenny)
- Labrisomus xanti T. N. Gill, 1860 (Largemouth blenny)
