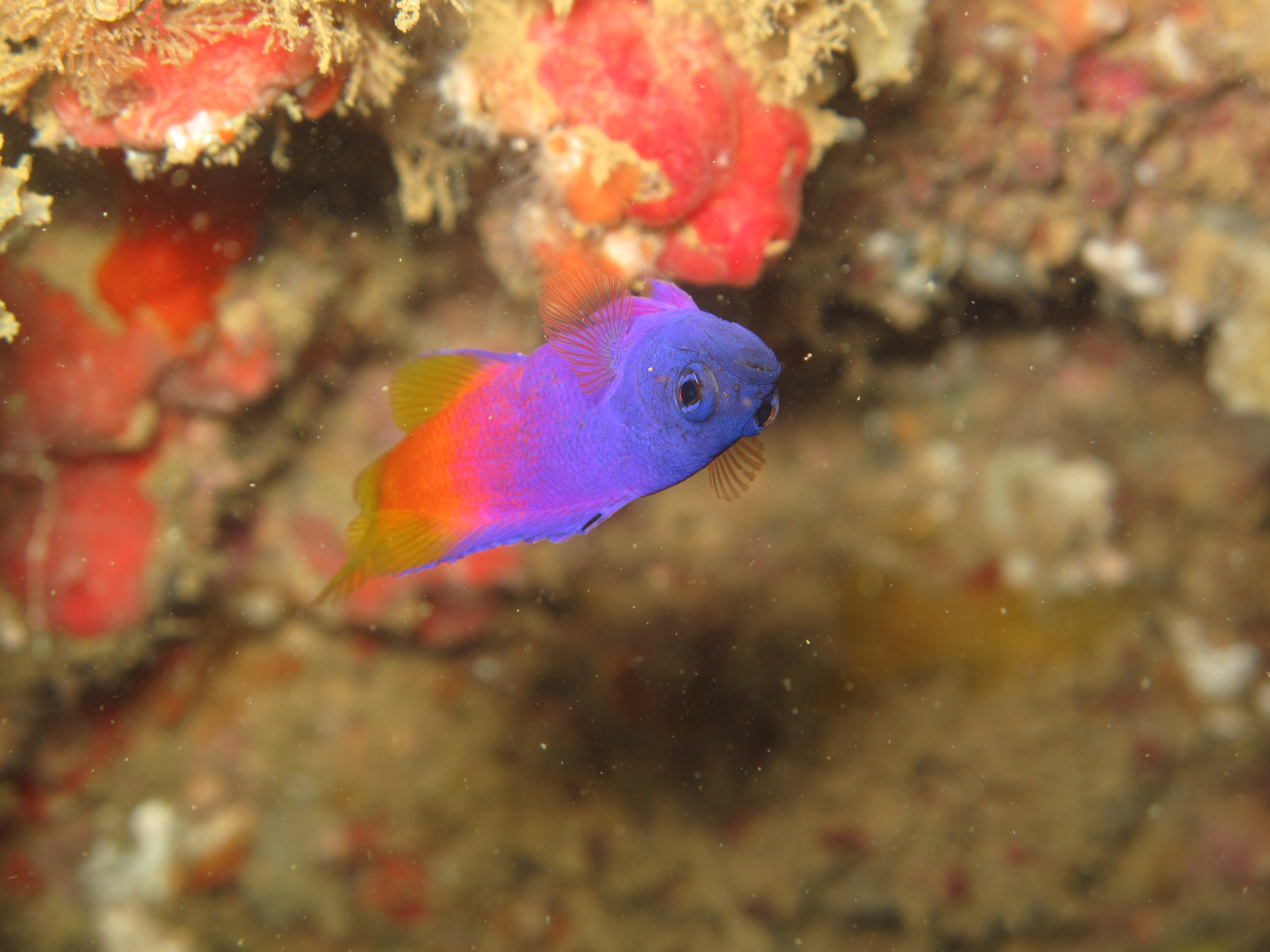

Conservation status
- Least Concern (IUCN 3.1)

Scientific classification
- Kingdom: Animalia
- Phylum: Chordata
- Class: Actinopterygii
- Division: Teleostei
- Order: Blenniiformes
- Family: Grammatidae
- Genus: Gramma
- Species: G. brasiliensis

Binomial name
- Gramma brasiliensis I. Sazima, Gasparini & R. L. Moura, 1998

= Gramma brasiliensis =

Species of fish

Gramma brasiliensis is a species of fish endemic to the Atlantic coast of Brazil where it is a reef inhabitant. It prefers areas with rocks or coral. This species can reach a length of 6.6 centimetres (2.6 in) SL. It can also be found in the aquarium trade.
