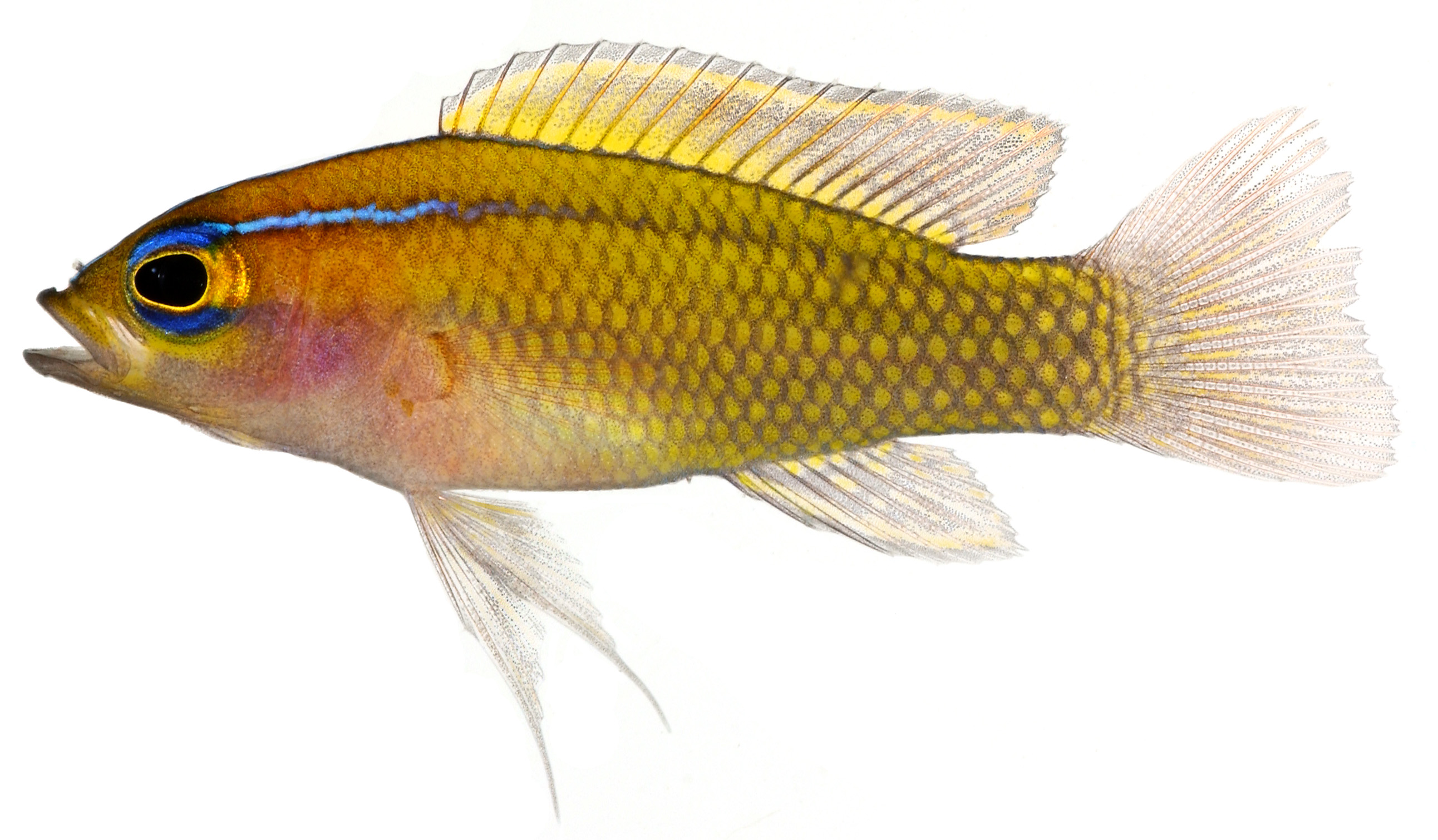
- Lipogramma trilineata

Scientific classification
- Kingdom: Animalia
- Phylum: Chordata
- Class: Actinopterygii
- Clade: Ovalentaria
- Order: Blenniiformes
- Family: Grammatidae
- Genus: Lipogramma; J. E. Böhlke, 1960

Type species
- Lipogramma anabantoides J. E. Böhlke, 1960

= Lipogramma =

Genus of fishes

Lipogramma is a genus of fish in the family Grammatidae native to the western Atlantic Ocean.

== Species ==
There are currently 10 recognized species in this genus:

- Lipogramma anabantoides J. E. Böhlke, 1960 (Dusky basslet)
- Lipogramma evides C. R. Robins & P. L. Colin, 1979 (Banded basslet)
- Lipogramma flavescens Gilmore & R. S. Jones, 1988 (Yellow basslet)
- Lipogramma haberorum C. C. Baldwin, Nonaka & D. R. Robertson, 2016 (Yellow-banded basslet)
- Lipogramma klayi J. E. Randall, 1963 (Bicolor basslet)
- Lipogramma levinsoni C. C. Baldwin, Nonaka & D. R. Robertson, 2016 (Hourglass basslet)
- Lipogramma regia C. R. Robins & P. L. Colin, 1979 (Royal basslet)
- Lipogramma robinsi Gilmore, 1997 (Yellow-bar basslet)
- Lipogramma rosea C. R. Gilbert, 1979 (Rosy basslet)
- Lipogramma trilineata J. E. Randall, 1963 (Three-line basslet)
