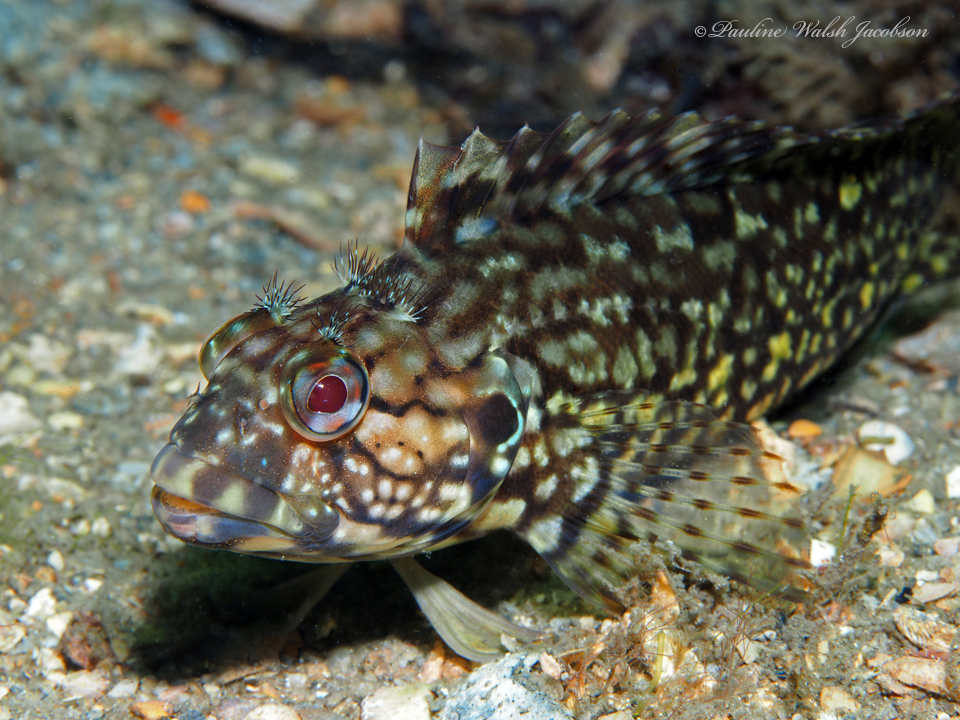

Conservation status
- Least Concern (IUCN 3.1)

Scientific classification
- Kingdom: Animalia
- Phylum: Chordata
- Class: Actinopterygii
- Division: Teleostei
- Order: Blenniiformes
- Family: Labrisomidae
- Genus: Labrisomus
- Species: L. conditus

Binomial name
- Labrisomus conditus I. Sazima (fr), Carvalho-Filho, Gasparini & C. Sazima, 2009

= Labrisomus conditus =

Species of fish

Labrisomus conditus, the Masquerader hairy blenny, is a species of labrisomid blenny native to the Fernando de Noronha Archipelago, off northeastern Brazil, and it has been reported from Florida, United States, in the Atlantic Ocean. This species can reach a length of 13.4 centimetres (5.3 in) SL.
