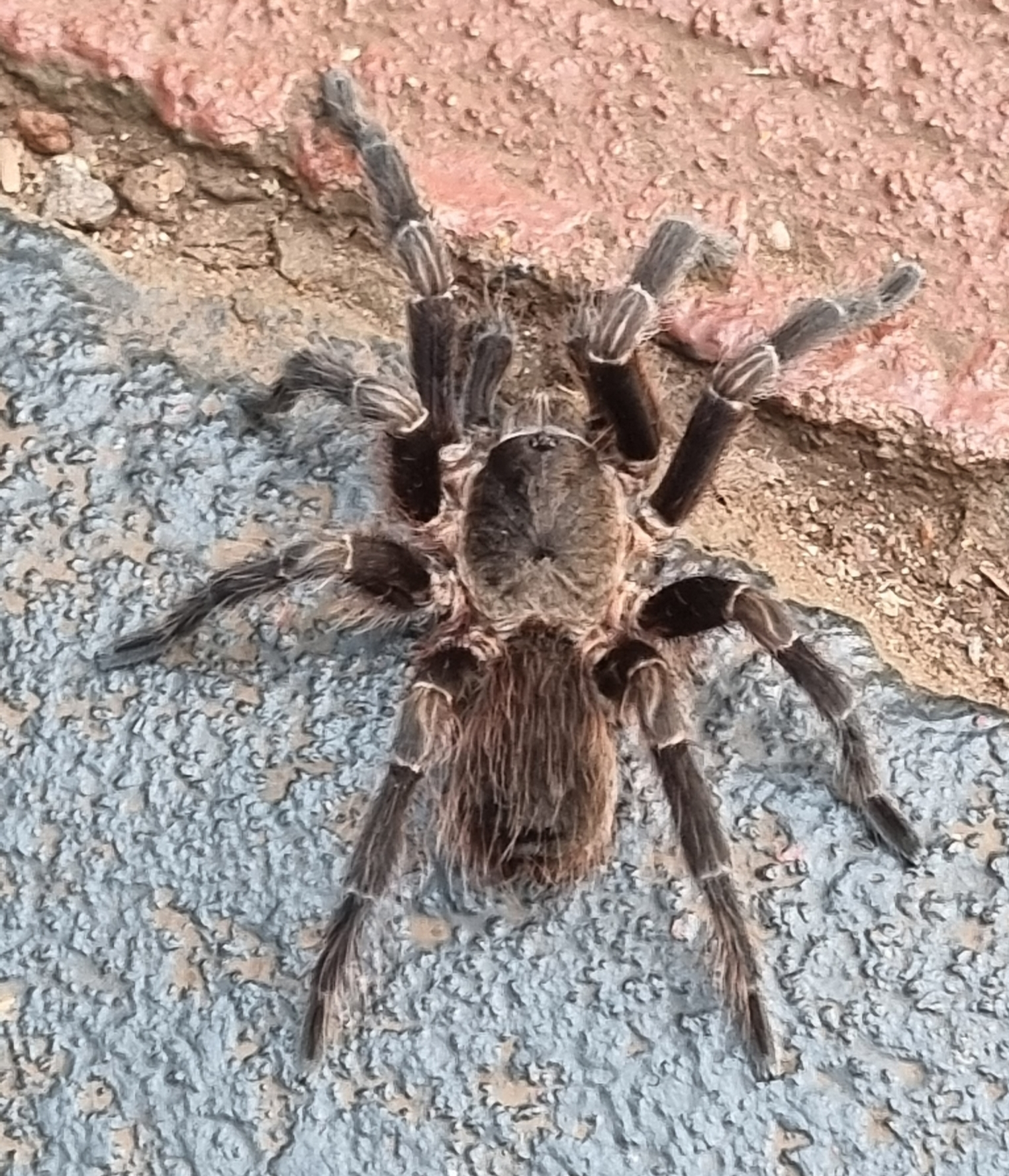
- P. longisternale
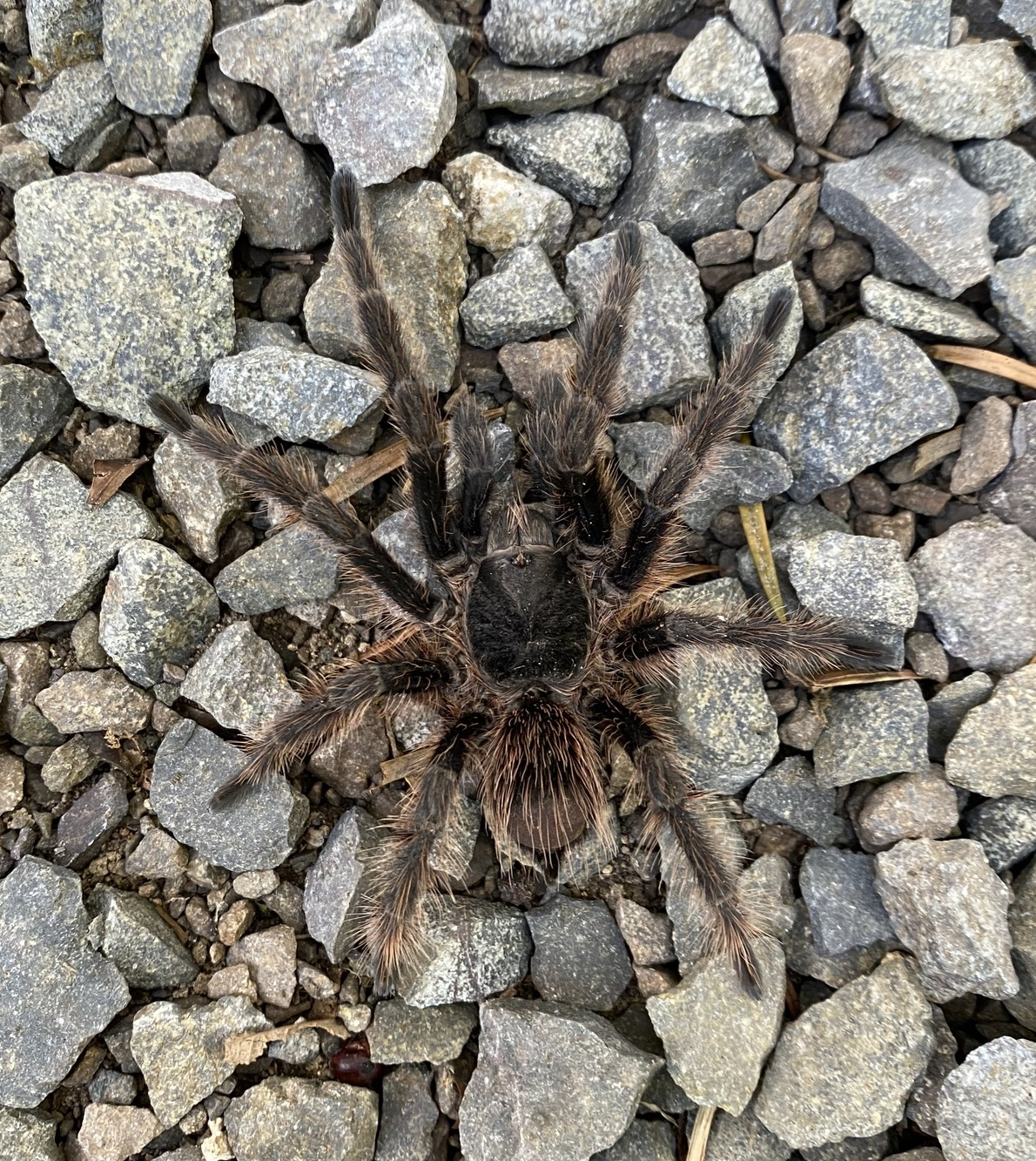
- P. vitiosum

Scientific classification
- Kingdom: Animalia
- Phylum: Arthropoda
- Subphylum: Chelicerata
- Class: Arachnida
- Order: Araneae
- Infraorder: Mygalomorphae
- Family: Theraphosidae
- Genus: Pterinopelma; Pocock, 1901

Type species
- P. vitiosum (Keyserling, 1891)

Species
- 3, see text

= Pterinopelma =

Genus of spiders

Pterinopelma is a genus of Brazilian tarantulas that was first described by Reginald Innes Pocock in 1901. It was removed from the synonymy of Eupalaestrus in 2011.

== Distribution ==
The three described species are found in Brazil and Argentina.

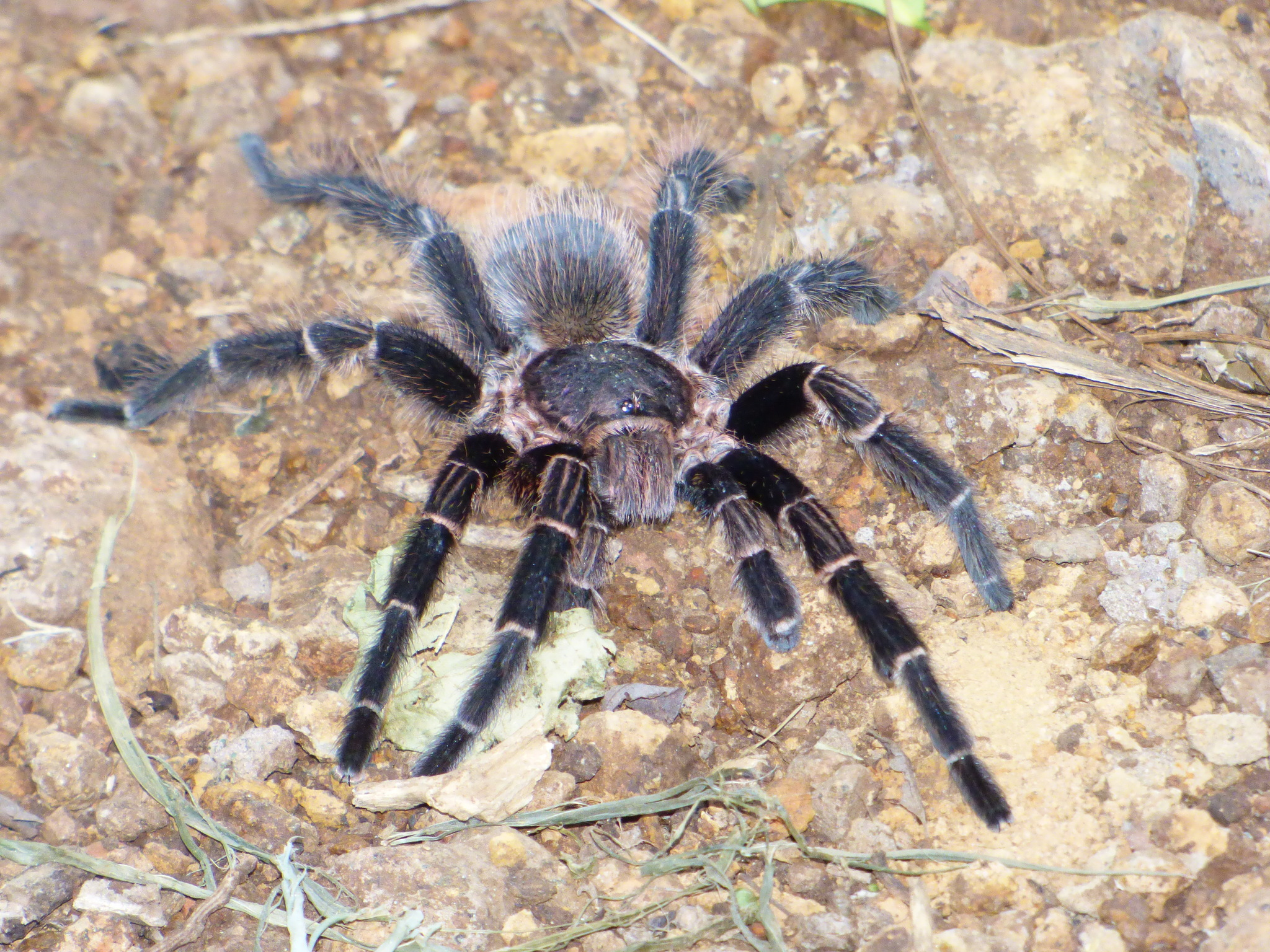
P. roseum from Argentina

== Diagnosis ==
They resemble the Lasiodora, Vitalius, and Nhandu genera as they all lack accessory prolateral keels and by having an apical and sub apical palpal keel in males. They own a short spermathecae which is separated by a sclerotized area in females. Males can be distinguished by lack stridulating hairs on the prolateral coxae, and owning denticles in the inferior keel and weakly developed keels of the palpal bulb. Females can be distinguished by the absence of long hairs on the carapace, and having a sternum which is as wide as it is long, or being wider than longer.

== Species ==
As of October 2025, this genus includes three species:

- Pterinopelma longisternale (Bertani, 2001) – Brazil, Argentina
- Pterinopelma roseum (Mello-Leitão, 1923) – Brazil, Argentina
- Pterinopelma vitiosum (Keyserling, 1891) – Brazil (type species)

== Taxonomy ==
P. felipeleitei was elevated to its own genus Parvicarina in 2023, based on advances in phylogeny and morphological differences. In the same study, P. sazimai was also elevated to its own genus, Lasiocyano.
