= Labrisomus fernandezianus =

Conservation status
- Least Concern (IUCN 3.1)

Scientific classification
- Kingdom: Animalia
- Phylum: Chordata
- Class: Actinopterygii
- Order: Blenniiformes
- Family: Labrisomidae
- Genus: Labrisomus
- Species: L. fernandezianus

Binomial name
- Labrisomus fernandezianus (Guichenot, 1848)

Synonyms
- Clinus fernandezianus Guichenot, 1848

Species of fish

Labrisomus fernandezianus is a species of labrisomid blenny endemic to the Juan Fernández Islands, in the southeastern Pacific Ocean.
