= Labrisomus wigginsi =

Conservation status
- Data Deficient (IUCN 3.1)

Scientific classification
- Kingdom: Animalia
- Phylum: Chordata
- Class: Actinopterygii
- Order: Blenniiformes
- Family: Labrisomidae
- Genus: Labrisomus
- Species: L. wigginsi

Binomial name
- Labrisomus wigginsi C. Hubbs, 1953

Species of fish

Labrisomus wigginsi, the Baja blenny, is a species of labrisomid blenny endemic to the Pacific coast of Baja California. This species is only known from shallow, weed-grown rocky areas and also from tide pools where it is known to occur down to a depth of about 9 metres (30 ft). The specific name honours the collector of the type, the botanist Ira L. Wiggins (1899-1987) of Stanford University.
