= Labrisomus socorroensis =

Conservation status
- Vulnerable (IUCN 3.1)

Scientific classification
- Kingdom: Animalia
- Phylum: Chordata
- Class: Actinopterygii
- Order: Blenniiformes
- Family: Labrisomidae
- Genus: Labrisomus
- Species: L. socorroensis

Binomial name
- Labrisomus socorroensis C. Hubbs, 1953

Synonyms
- Labrisomus soccorroensis C. Hubbs, 1953

Species of fish

Labrisomus socorroensis, the Misspelled blenny, is a species of labrisomid blenny endemic to the Revillagigedo Islands where they inhabit rocky areas at depths of from extremely shallow waters to 10 metres (33 ft).

== Etymology ==
The common name of this species - "Misspelled blenny" - derives from the fact that when Clark Hubbs initially published the description of this species he named it "L. soccorroensis" after the location from which the type specimen was collected - Socorro Island. However, a species named after Socorro Island should be named "socorroensis" and thus the blenny was "misspelled".
