= Labrisomus jenkinsi =

Conservation status
- Vulnerable (IUCN 3.1)

Scientific classification
- Kingdom: Animalia
- Phylum: Chordata
- Class: Actinopterygii
- Order: Blenniiformes
- Family: Labrisomidae
- Genus: Labrisomus
- Species: L. jenkinsi

Binomial name
- Labrisomus jenkinsi (Heller & Snodgrass, 1903)

Synonyms
- Lepisoma jenkinsi Heller & Snodgrass, 1903

Species of fish

Labrisomus jenkinsi, Jenkin's blenny, is a species of labrisomid blenny endemic to the Galapagos Islands where it seems to inhabit areas with rocky substrates. This species can reach a length of 13 centimetres (5.1 in) TL. The specific name honours Oliver Peebles Jenkins (1850–1935), who was a professor of physiology at Stanford University.
