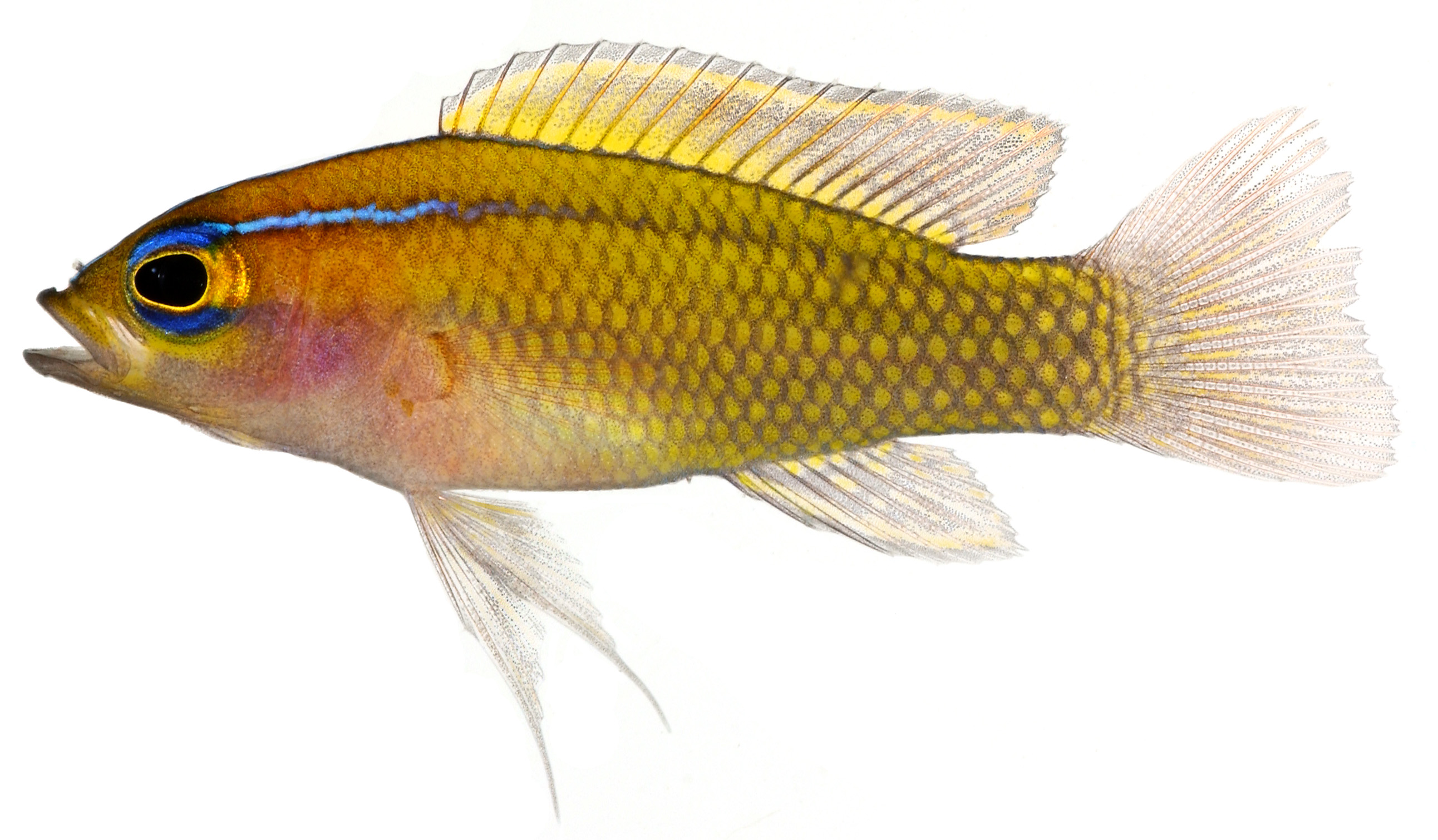

Conservation status
- Least Concern (IUCN 3.1)

Scientific classification
- Kingdom: Animalia
- Phylum: Chordata
- Class: Actinopterygii
- Order: Blenniiformes
- Family: Grammatidae
- Genus: Lipogramma
- Species: L. trilineata

Binomial name
- Lipogramma trilineata Randall, 1963

= Lipogramma trilineata =

Species of fish

Lipogramma trilineata, the three-lined basslet, is a species of ray-finned fish from the family Grammatidae. It is found in the western Atlantic Ocean from the waters off southeastern Florida south through the Bahamas into the Gulf of Mexico and the Caribbean Sea as well as the coasts of Central and South America from Quintana Roo, Mexico to Nicaragua, and the seas off Cartagena and those off Venezuela at Curaçao and Bonaire. It occurs underneath rocky and coral ledges as well as occurring in deep reefs and on the outer wall at depths ranging from 22–69 metres (72–226 ft). Its range has been invaded by lionfish, an invasive species in the western Atlantic, which prey on a variety of fish species smaller than 15 centimetres (5.9 in) which means that both adults and juveniles L. trineata are likely prey of lionfish. It has been recorded that in the Bahamas, there has been a near two-thirds decline in the biomass of fish which lionfish prey on over a period of two years. Other species of basslet have been confirmed as prey for lionfishes.

Lipogramma trileaneata has an elongated, compressed body with a large eye and short snout, the mouth sits at the front of the head, and it has teeth on its jaws, vomer and palatine bone. The upper part of the head the back and the dorsal fin are yellow to reddish orange while the rest of the bos is bluish grey., the yellow colouration can cover the whole body. There are three black-edged blue lines, one along the centre of the snout, through the forehead and the nape and one on each side from the eye to beneath the front of the dorsal fin. There is a blue line along the margin of the dorsal fin and the other fins are a translucent blue.
