= Labrisomus pomaspilus =

Conservation status
- Data Deficient (IUCN 3.1)

Scientific classification
- Kingdom: Animalia
- Phylum: Chordata
- Class: Actinopterygii
- Order: Blenniiformes
- Family: Labrisomidae
- Genus: Labrisomus
- Species: L. pomaspilus

Binomial name
- Labrisomus pomaspilus V. G. Springer & Rosenblatt, 1965

Species of fish

Labrisomus pomaspilus is a species of labrisomid blenny only known from the Pacific coast in the area of Esmeraldas, Ecuador and from some locations in Colombia. This species is known to be a tide pool denizen. A female of the species measured 8.4 centimetres (3.3 in) SL.
