= Leptodactylus camaquara =

Conservation status
- Near Threatened (IUCN 3.1)

Scientific classification
- Kingdom: Animalia
- Phylum: Chordata
- Class: Amphibia
- Order: Anura
- Family: Leptodactylidae
- Genus: Leptodactylus
- Species: L. camaquara

Binomial name
- Leptodactylus camaquara Sazima & Bokermann, 1978

Species of amphibian

Leptodactylus camaquara is a species of frogs in the family Leptodactylidae. It is endemic to Brazil.

== Habitat ==
This frog has been reported in Cerrado biomes and in savanna. Scientists have observed the frog between 1200 and 1650 meters above sea level. Scientists observed the frog in many protected places.

Scientists have seen the frog in some protected places, specifically Parque Estadual do Rio Preto and Parque Nacional da Serra do Cipó. Scientists believe it could also live in Parque Nacional Das Sempre Vivas.

== Reproduction ==
The male frog digs a burrow more than 50 meters from the nearest stream. The female frog deposits eggs in a foam nest. Sometimes many female frogs put their nests around the same rock or otherwise at the same site. When the rain falls, the foam nests break apart and the tadpoles travel to puddles, streams, or marshes. Some scientists believe tadpoles can complete their development without leaving the foam nest.

== Threats ==
IUCN classifies this species as near threatened. It has been affected by habitat loss in favor of agriculture and grazing, which come with increased incidence of fire. Because scientists only study this species in undisturbed habitat, they do not know if the frog is tolerant to anthropogenic disturbance.
