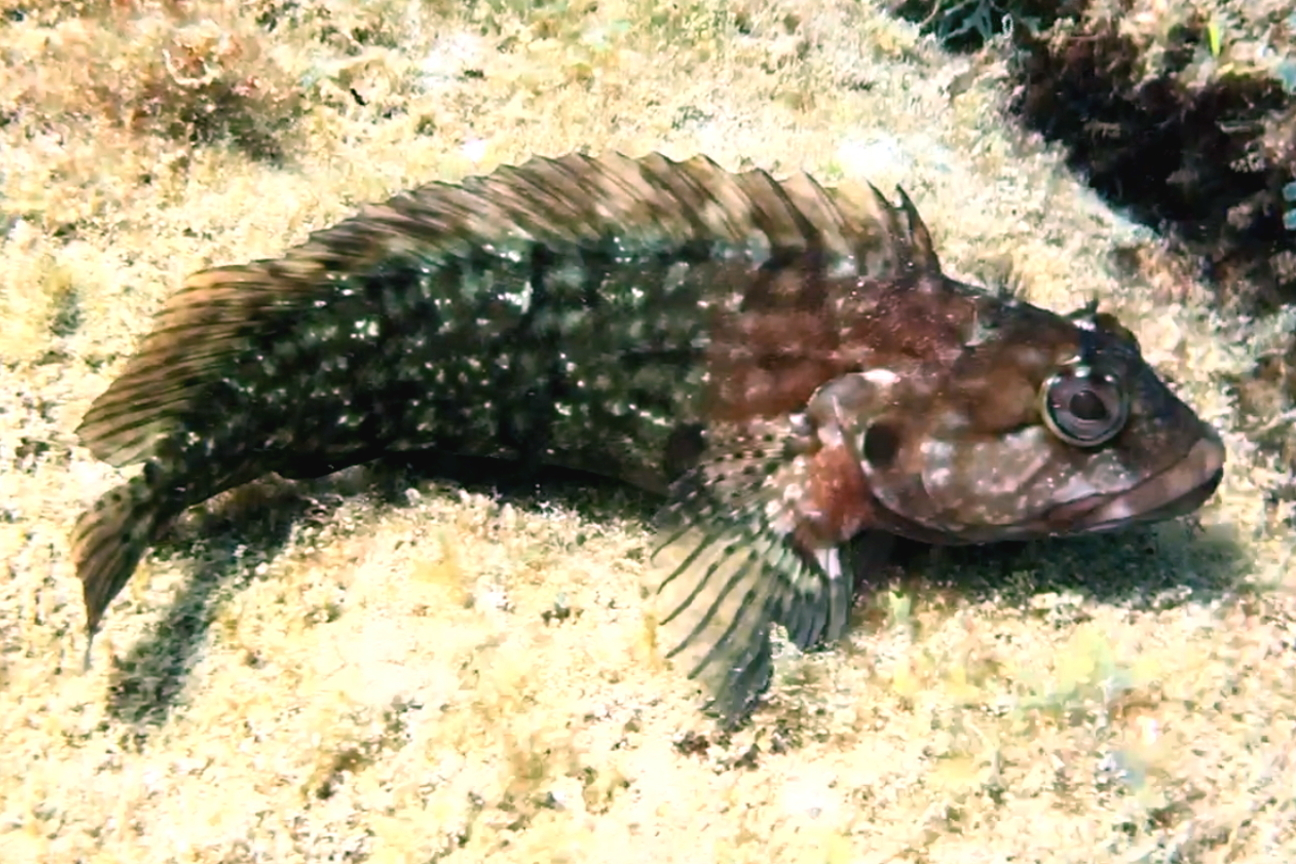

Conservation status
- Least Concern (IUCN 3.1)

Scientific classification
- Kingdom: Animalia
- Phylum: Chordata
- Class: Actinopterygii
- Division: Teleostei
- Order: Blenniiformes
- Family: Labrisomidae
- Genus: Labrisomus
- Species: L. nuchipinnis

Binomial name
- Labrisomus nuchipinnis (Quoy & Gaimard, 1824)

Synonyms
- Clinus nuchipinnis Quoy & Gaimard, 1824; Clinus pectinifer Valenciennes, 1836; Labrisomus pectinifer (Valenciennes, 1836); Clinus canariensis Valenciennes, 1838; Clinus pedatipennis Rochebrune, 1880

= Labrisomus nuchipinnis =

Species of fish

Labrisomus nuchipinnis, the hairy blenny, is a species of labrisomid blenny native to the Atlantic Ocean from the coast of the Americas to the African coast. This species prefers areas that give them crevices and holes to shelter in such as areas with rock or rubble substrates, reefs or beds of seagrass. They can be found in shallow water only a few centimeters deep to a depth of 10 metres (33 ft) though they are much rarer deeper than 5 metres (16 ft). Carnivorous, they prey on such animals as crustaceans, gastropods, echinoderms such as urchins and brittle stars, polychaete worms and other fishes. This species can reach a length of 23 centimetres (9.1 in) TL, making them the largest of the Labrisomidae in the Caribbean. They can also be found in the aquarium trade.

== Aquarium trade ==
The hairy blenny can be kept as fish, although often other species of blenny are preferred among aquarists. Considered an intermediate-level species, some experienced aquarists may keep these fish. They are typically kept in tanks around 1500 liters (396.25 gallons) and are best kept in temperatures between 23 - 27 °C. Domesticated diets may include brine shrimp, clam meat, flakes, frozen food, krill, and mysis.

== Ecology and courtship ==
The fish prefer shallow water between 0 - 3 metres (9.8 ft), although they have been recorded up to 22 m (72 ft) deep. They are often found in the bottom water column.

The fish are reef associated fish, found in coral, rock, and oyster reefs with water temperatures between 18.8 - 30.1 °C (65.84 - 86.18 °F).

L. nuchipinnis lay benthic eggs, or eggs laid directly onto the seafloor. However, larvae are pelagic and planktonic. The fish exhibit paternal behavior, seen guarding and nesting.

The fish are polygynous and batch spawners (to increase likelihood of successful offspring). However, courtship and mating tends to follow a similar pattern. The fish begin by identifying a prospective individual, which is followed by arousal through nudging (initiated by the female). The fish continue to court the other until the female lays eggs. The eggs, spherical and orange in color, are then externally fertilized by the male. Males have been noticed fanning the nest after this display.

== Gallery ==
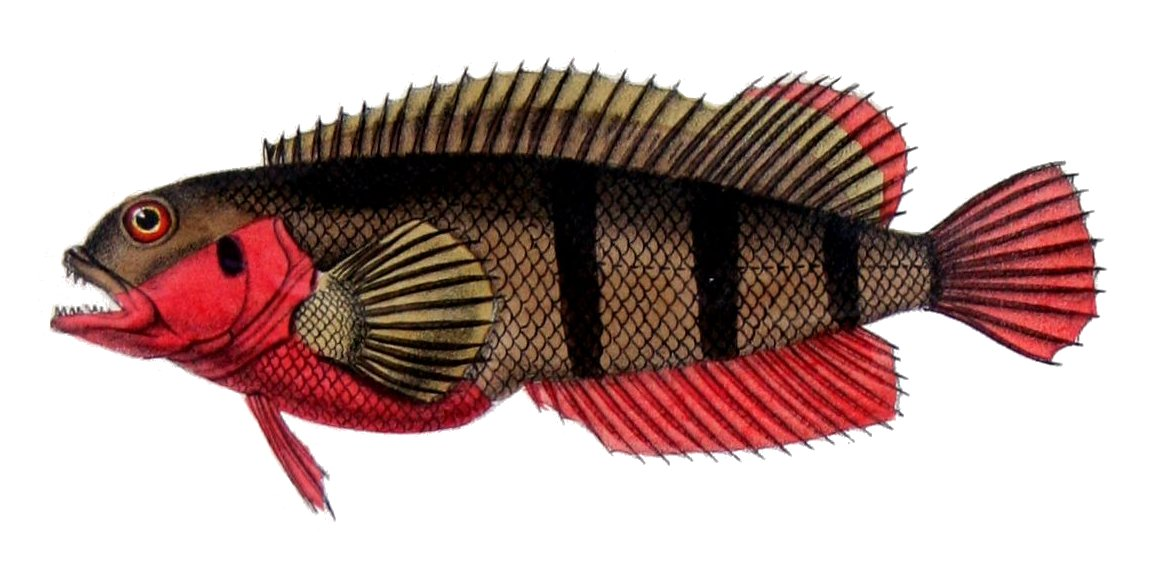
Artist's interpretation of Labrisomus nuchipinnis

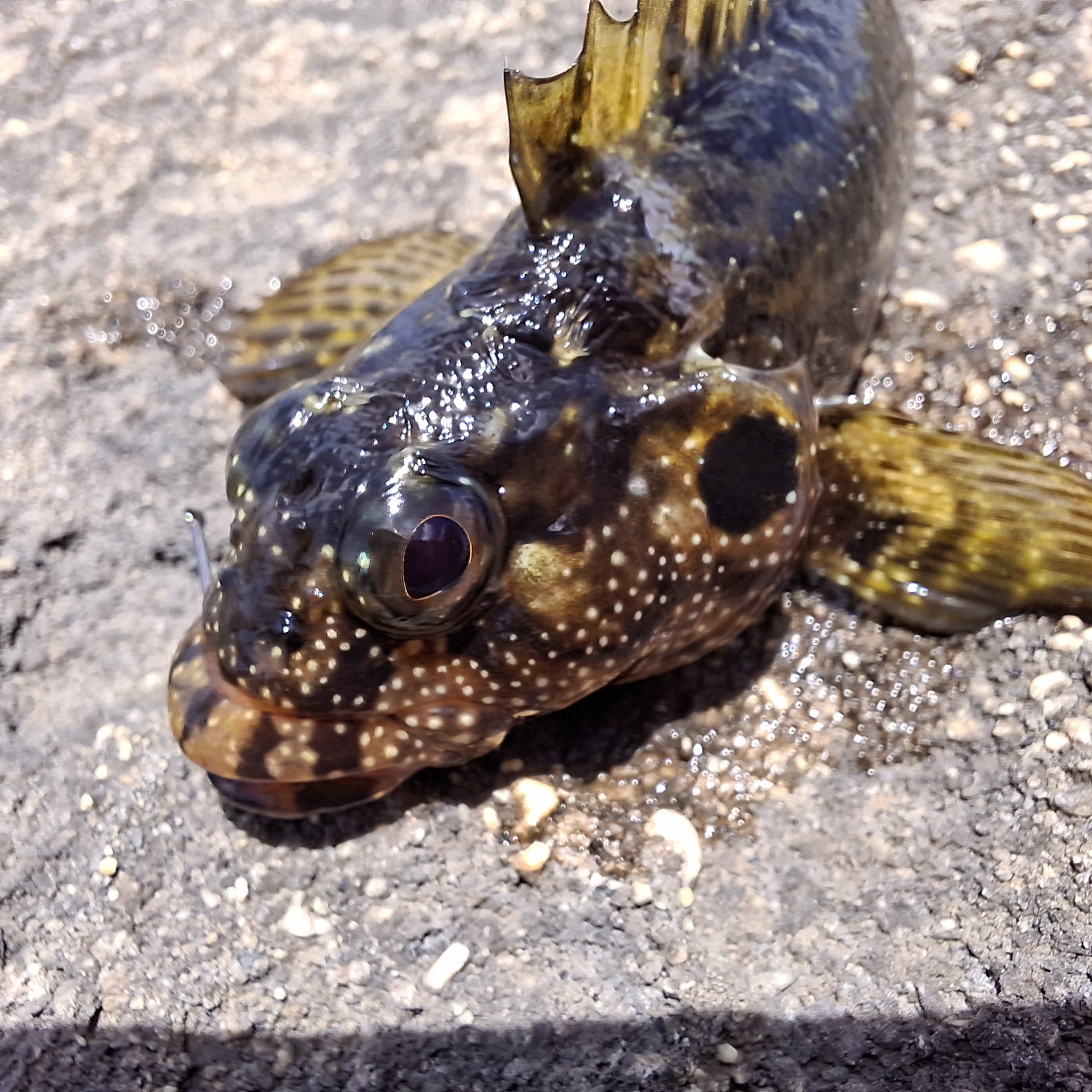
L. nuchipinnis caught near Cape Verde
