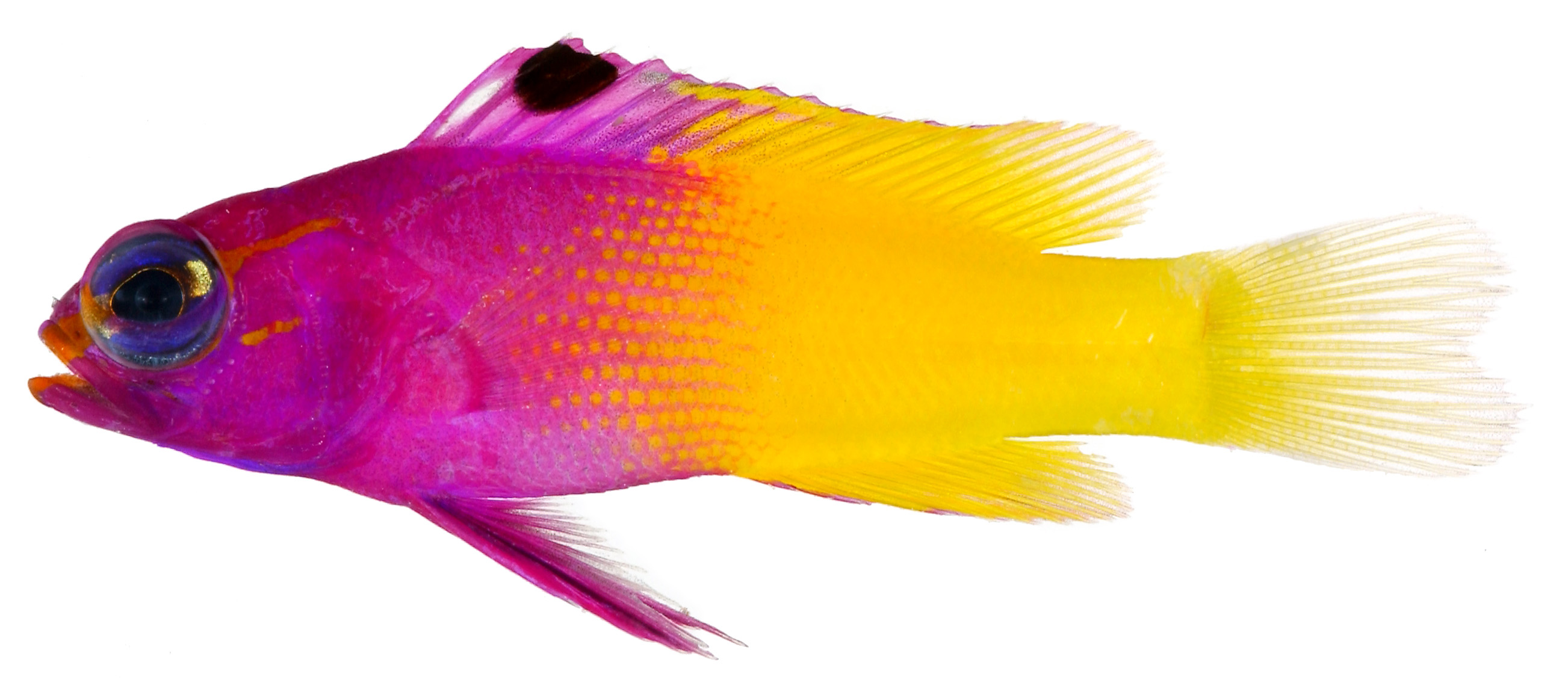

Conservation status
- Least Concern (IUCN 3.1)

Scientific classification
- Kingdom: Animalia
- Phylum: Chordata
- Class: Actinopterygii
- Division: Teleostei
- Order: Blenniiformes
- Family: Grammatidae
- Genus: Gramma
- Species: G. loreto

Binomial name
- Gramma loreto Poey, 1868

= Royal gramma =

Species of fish

The royal gramma (Gramma loreto), also known as the fairy basslet, is a species of fish in the family Grammatidae native to reef environments of the tropical western Atlantic Ocean. They are commonly kept in aquariums.

== Appearance ==
The fish can be a light purple to a deep violet starting at the head which fades mid-body to a golden yellow at the tail. The royal gramma will also have a small black spot on the front of the dorsal fin and a black line that streaks through the eye. It resembles the false gramma (Pictichromis paccagnellae), with the two main differences between the two being the false gramma has clear fins and does not fade, but rather has a distinct change in color. The royal gramma is relatively small, averaging slightly over 8 cm (3.1 in) and has been tank bred. The largest scientifically-measured royal gramma was 8 cm (3.1 in) long.

== Diet ==
The royal gramma is a planktivore, eating mostly zooplankton and crustaceans. The royal gramma is also a cleaner fish. It removes the ectoparasites (a parasite that lives on the skin of a fish) from other fish and learns to eat dead food, such as crustaceans and fish flesh. They prefer to pick their food from the middle of the water column. Their natural range covers the Bahamas, Venezuela, Antilles, Bermuda, and through the waters surrounding Central America and the northern part of South America. The Royal Gramma tends to swim more towards the bottom with the depth range between 1 and 20 m (3 and 60 ft).

== In the aquarium ==
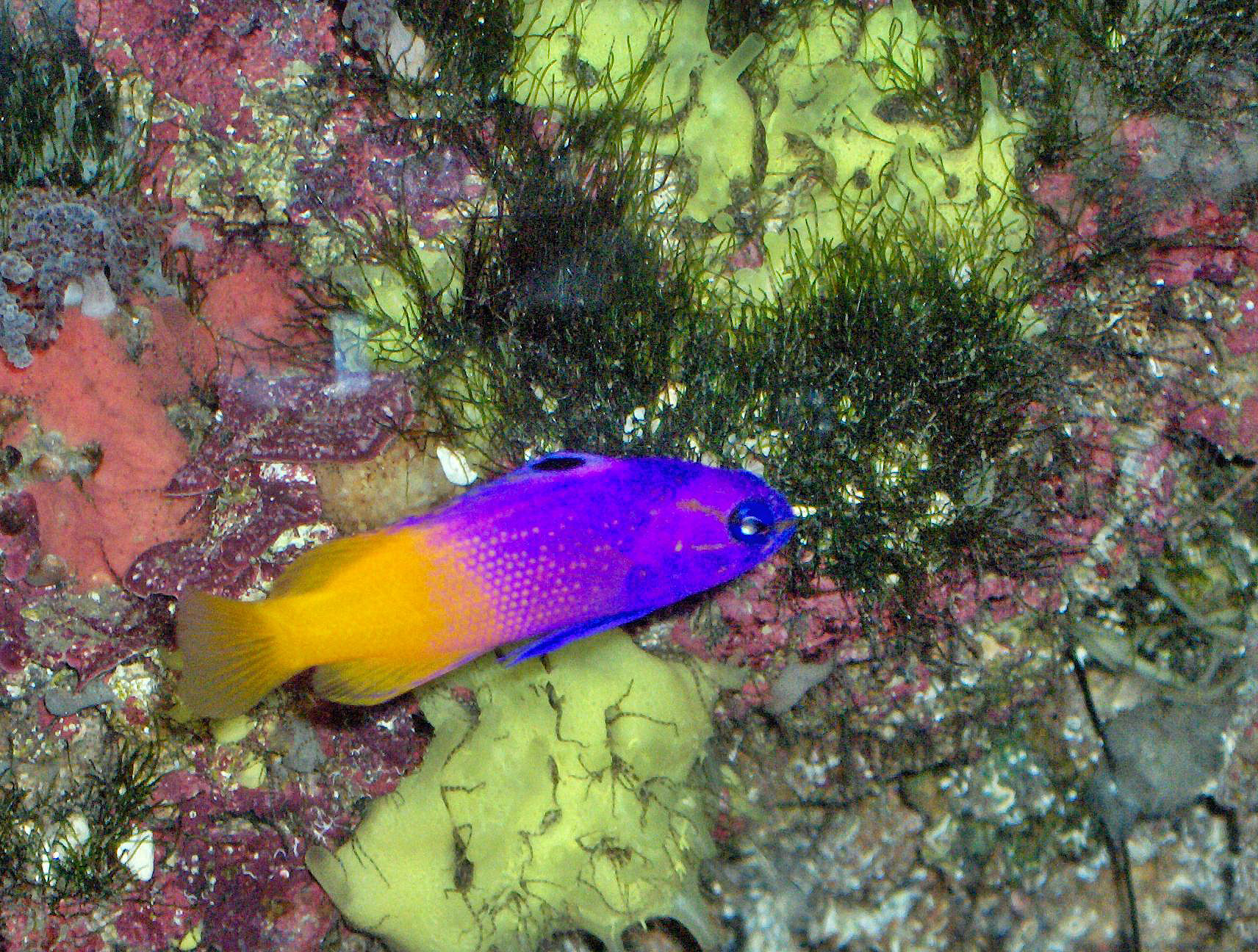
Royal gramma in the Oceanographic Museum of Monaco

Due to their relatively peaceful nature, diet, and small size, the royal gramma is considered an ideal inhabitant for most reef aquaria containing coral and other invertebrates. Notwithstanding this general statement, they can become aggressive towards tank-mates when kept in smaller nano reef tanks. They stake out territories throughout rocks and crevices and choose favorite hiding places. They are generally peaceful fish, but are very protective of their territories and are known for chasing out other small fish. They tend to stay in one area of the tank and, when startled, will dart back into their holes. They will vigorously guard their hiding places and, when threatened, will open their mouths wide in a threatening gesture to ward off the intruders. The royal gramma tends to orient itself to be parallel with the surface to which it is closest, resulting in the fish swimming straight up and down or sometimes upside down beneath ledges. This behavior is not to be mistaken for illness.

The minimum suggested tank size is 30 gallons and the tank should not receive sharp lighting. The ideal water temperature should range between 72 and 78 °F and the water pH should be between 8.1 and 8.4, with specific gravity of 1.020–1.025. They are often kept in reef aquaria and are generally kept singly or in pairs. However, small groups can be kept as long as the tank is large enough and has enough cracks and crevices for each fish to have its own territory. The royal gramma should not be kept with its own kind unless in a formed male-female pair. It should also not be kept with larger, aggressive fish that will eat them. They are, however, resistant to most diseases and make very good beginner fish. It will also accept frozen and meaty foods, such as brine shrimp and mysis shrimp in the wild. The royal gramma is very easy to feed, but rotating their foods is said to keep them from becoming picky. Captive royal gramma will also eat flake and pellet foods.

=== Breeding ===
Although pairs are difficult to find because the difference between male and female is not visible, they are very easy to breed. With males usually being larger than females, the male will build the nest among rocks using pieces of algae. The male will then lead the female to the nest, where she will deposit 20–100 eggs in the nest. The male exhibits the following nest care practices: protecting the nest and eggs, ongoing maintenance, frequent debris removal, and constant barging into the nest. During the breeding period, this behavior is repeated almost every day for a month or longer. The eggs are about 1 mm (0.04 in) and are equipped with small protuberances over the surface with tiny threads extending from them. These threads hold onto the algae of the nest and keep the eggs in place. The eggs will hatch in five to seven days, normally in the evening, and can feed on rotifers until they are large enough to consume newly hatched brine shrimp.

== See also ==
- Blackcap basslet
