= Scinax curicica =

Lanceback treefrog

Conservation status
- Data Deficient (IUCN 3.1)

Scientific classification
- Kingdom: Animalia
- Phylum: Chordata
- Class: Amphibia
- Order: Anura
- Family: Hylidae
- Genus: Scinax
- Species: S. curicica

Binomial name
- Scinax curicica Pugliese, Pombal & Sazima, 2004

Species of frog

Scinax curicica, the lanceback treefrog, is a species of frog in the family Hylidae. It is endemic to Brazil. Its natural habitats are subtropical or tropical high-altitude grassland, intermittent rivers, and intermittent freshwater marshes.
