= Scinax maracaya =

Conservation status
- Data Deficient (IUCN 3.1)

Scientific classification
- Kingdom: Animalia
- Phylum: Chordata
- Class: Amphibia
- Order: Anura
- Family: Hylidae
- Genus: Scinax
- Species: S. maracaya

Binomial name
- Scinax maracaya Cardoso & Sazima, 1980

Species of frog

Scinax maracaya is a species of frog in the family Hylidae. It is endemic to Brazil. Its natural habitats are moist savanna, freshwater marshes, and intermittent freshwater marshes. It is threatened by habitat loss.
