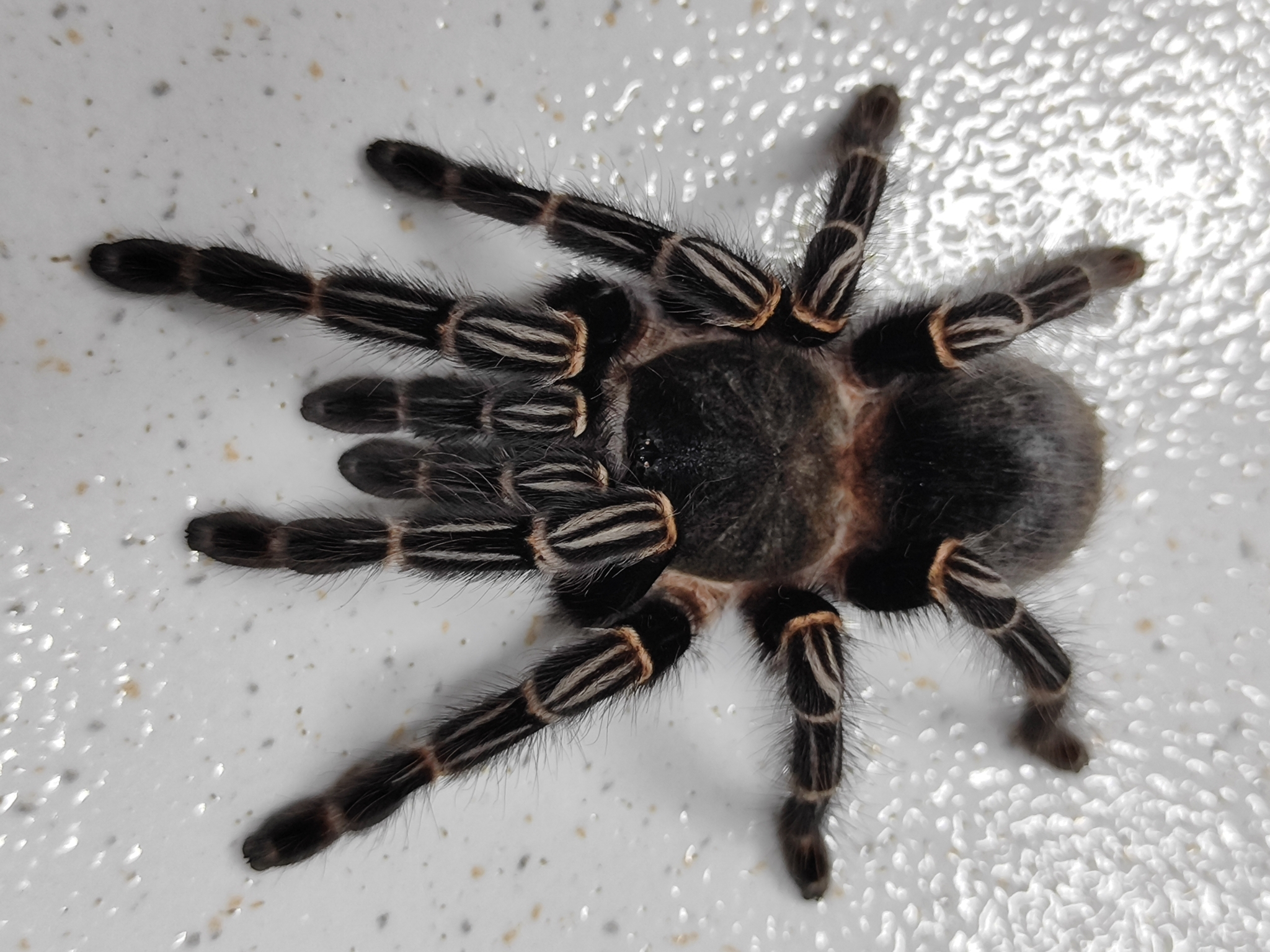
- female

Scientific classification
- Kingdom: Animalia
- Phylum: Arthropoda
- Subphylum: Chelicerata
- Class: Arachnida
- Order: Araneae
- Infraorder: Mygalomorphae
- Family: Theraphosidae
- Genus: Parvicarina; Galleti-Lima, Hamilton, Borges & Guadanucci, 2023
- Species: P. felipeleitei

Binomial name
- Parvicarina felipeleitei (Bertani & Leal, 2016)

Synonyms
- Pterinopelma sazimai Bertani, Nagahama & Fukushima, 2011; Pterinopelma felipeleitei Bertani & Leal, 2016

= Parvicarina =

Species of spider

Parvicarina is a monotypic genus of spiders in the family Theraphosidae containing the single species, Parvicarina felipeleitei.

== Distribution ==
Parvicarina felipeleitei has been recorded from Brazil.

== Etymology ==
The genus name is a combination of Latin parvus (small) and carina (keel), referring to the small keels present on the male palpal bulb of the type-species.

The species name honors Brazilian herpetologist Felipe S. F. Leite for his extensive contribution to the knowledge of the biodiversity of the Espinhaço Mountain Range.

== Taxonomy ==
The species was originally described in genus Pterinopelma. It was transferred to its own genus based on advances in phylogeny and morphological differences.
