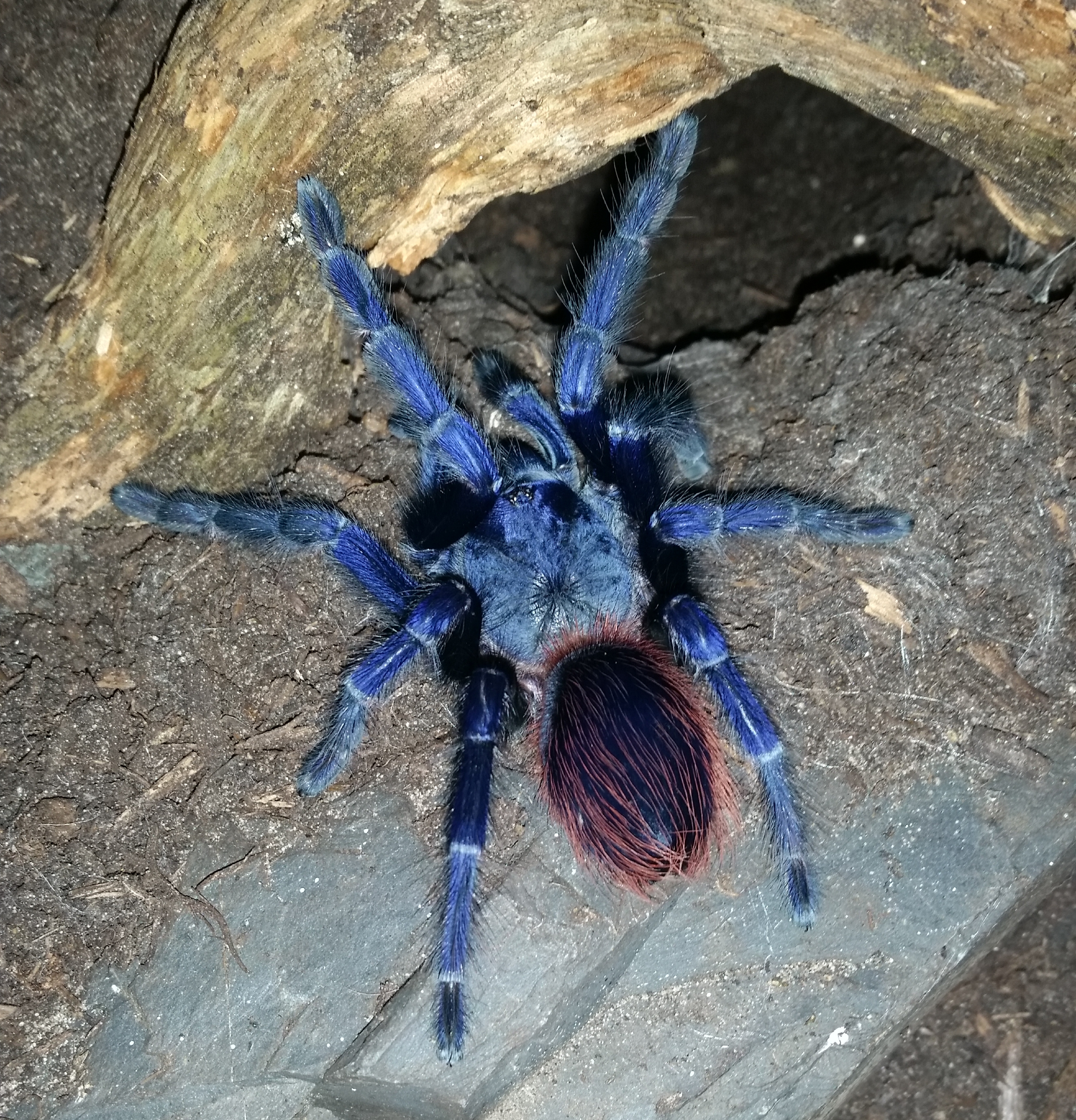

Scientific classification
- Kingdom: Animalia
- Phylum: Arthropoda
- Subphylum: Chelicerata
- Class: Arachnida
- Order: Araneae
- Infraorder: Mygalomorphae
- Family: Theraphosidae
- Genus: Lasiocyano; Galleti-Lima, Hamilton, Borges & Guadanucci, 2023
- Species: L. sazimai

Binomial name
- Lasiocyano sazimai (Bertani, Nagahama & Fukushima, 2011)

Synonyms
- Pterinopelma sazimai Bertani, Nagahama & Fukushima, 2011

= Lasiocyano =

Species of spider

Lasiocyano is a monotypic genus of tarantulas (family Theraphosidae), with the sole species Lasiocyano sazimai. It is commonly known as the Brazilian blue, iridescent blue or Sazima's tarantula.

The species was first described by Rogério Bertani, Roberto Hiroaki Nagahama and Caroline Sayuri Fukushima in 2011. In 2012, it became the first Brazilian species to appear on the International Institute for Species Exploration's top 10 new species list.

== Etymology ==
The genus name is a combination of Ancient Greek λάσιος (lásĭos, "hairy") and κύανος (kŭ́ănos, "blue"), referring to the blue iridescent setae of the type species.

The species name honors Ivan Sazima, a Brazilian zoologist who was the first to collect exemplars of the species. It is now considered an endangered species owing to smuggling and a shrinking habitat.

== Description ==
The life expectancy of Lasiocyano sazimai is not known. All of its body is iridescent blue in color, with the exception of the opisthosoma, which may be blue covered in reddish hairs, though some lack this reddish hairs. The tarantula may also be darker or brighter in color, depending on several factors.

== Habitat ==
Lasiocyano sazimai is native to an ecological island within the Chapada Diamantina National Park in Bahia, Brazil. It has average temperatures of 20 °C, with yearly precipitation being an average of 1000mm. It is home to plants such as bromeliads, orchids, and animals such as ocelots, rock cavies, and Teius teyou.

== Behavior ==
Lasiocyano sazimai spiders are opportunistic burrowers, though they spend most of their time in said burrows. If bothered they will bolt to their burrows, though if this is not possible, they will not hesitate to throw urticating hairs, or make a threat pose.

== Taxonomy ==
The species was previously described as Pterinopelma sazimai, but transferred to this newly erected genus based on advances in phylogeny and morphological differences.
