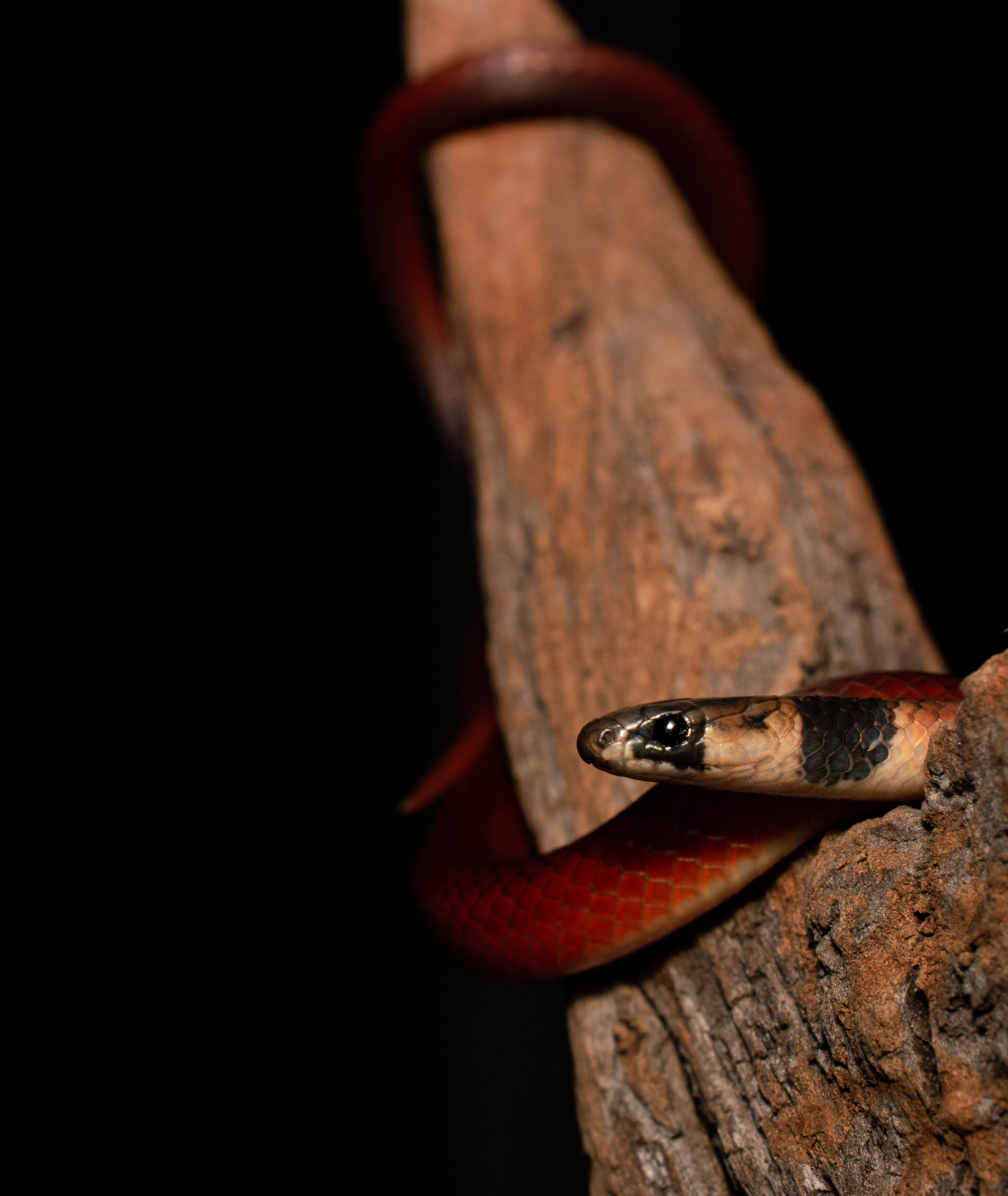

Conservation status
- Vulnerable (IUCN 3.1)

Scientific classification
- Kingdom: Animalia
- Phylum: Chordata
- Class: Reptilia
- Order: Squamata
- Suborder: Serpentes
- Family: Colubridae
- Genus: Tantilla
- Species: T. boipiranga

Binomial name
- Tantilla boipiranga Sawaya & Sazima, 2003

= Tantilla boipiranga =

Species of snake

Tantilla boipiranga is a species of snake of the family Colubridae.

The snake is found in Brazil.
