= Labrisomus xanti =

Conservation status
- Least Concern (IUCN 3.1)

Scientific classification
- Kingdom: Animalia
- Phylum: Chordata
- Class: Actinopterygii
- Order: Blenniiformes
- Family: Labrisomidae
- Genus: Labrisomus
- Species: L. xanti

Binomial name
- Labrisomus xanti T. N. Gill, 1860

Species of fish

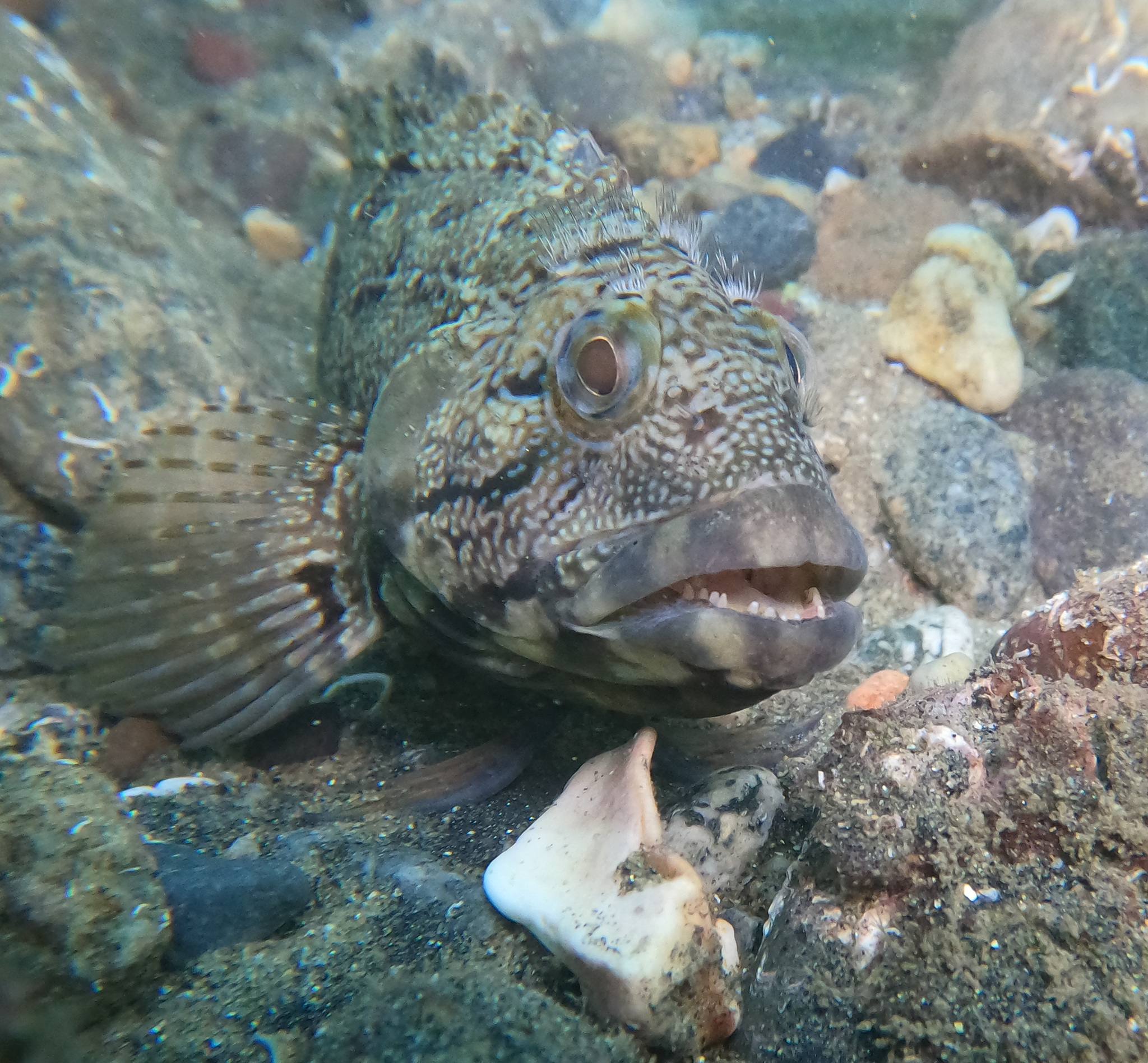

Labrisomus xanti, the Largemouth blenny, is a species of labrisomid blenny native to the Pacific coast of Mexico from Baja California to Jalisco. It inhabits shallow waters. This species can reach a length of 17.8 centimetres (7.0 in) TL. The specific name honours the collector of the type, the Hungarian zoologist John Xantus (1825-1894).
