= Labrisomus multiporosus =

Conservation status
- Least Concern (IUCN 3.1)

Scientific classification
- Kingdom: Animalia
- Phylum: Chordata
- Class: Actinopterygii
- Order: Blenniiformes
- Family: Labrisomidae
- Genus: Labrisomus
- Species: L. multiporosus

Binomial name
- Labrisomus multiporosus C. Hubbs, 1953

Species of fish

Labrisomus multiporosus, the Porehead blenny, is a species of labrisomid blenny native to the eastern Pacific Ocean from Mexico to Peru including the Galapagos Islands. This species lives on reefs from very shallow waters to a depth of 5 metres (16 ft). It can reach a length of 18 centimetres (7.1 in) TL though most do not exceed 10 centimetres (3.9 in).
