= Labrisomus cricota =

Conservation status
- Least Concern (IUCN 3.1)

Scientific classification
- Kingdom: Animalia
- Phylum: Chordata
- Class: Actinopterygii
- Order: Blenniiformes
- Family: Labrisomidae
- Genus: Labrisomus
- Species: L. cricota

Binomial name
- Labrisomus cricota I. Sazima (fr), Gasparini & R. L. Moura, 2002

Species of fish

Labrisomus cricota, the Mock blenny, is a species of labrisomid blenny native to the western Atlantic Ocean and the Caribbean Sea where it occurs on rocky bottoms with plentiful algal growth at depths down to 4 metres (13 ft). It is believed that the territorial males keep harems of females. Males of this species can reach a length of 9.3 centimetres (3.7 in) SL while females can attain a length of 10.3 centimetres (4.1 in). This is a species sought after by local subsistence fisheries.
