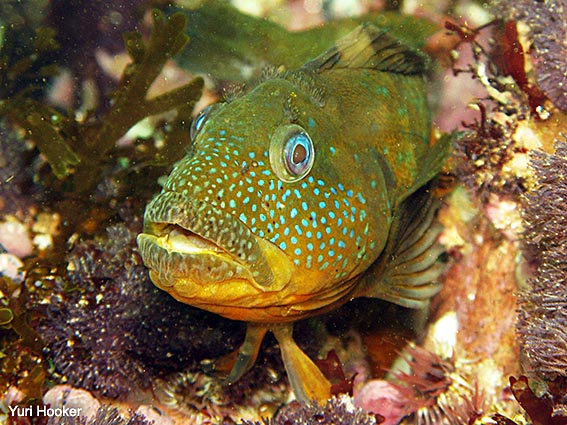

Conservation status
- Least Concern (IUCN 3.1)

Scientific classification
- Kingdom: Animalia
- Phylum: Chordata
- Class: Actinopterygii
- Order: Blenniiformes
- Family: Labrisomidae
- Genus: Labrisomus
- Species: L. philippii

Binomial name
- Labrisomus philippii (Steindachner, 1866)

Synonyms
- Clinus philippii Steindachner, 1866

= Labrisomus philippii =

Species of fish

Labrisomus philippii, the Chalaco clinid, is a species of labrisomid blenny native to the Pacific coast of South America from Peru to Chile. This species can reach a length of 35 centimetres (14 in) TL and the greatest recorded weight for a specimen of this fish was 635 grams (22.4 oz). The identity of the person honoured by Steindachner in the specific name of this fish is unknown but it is thought to be one of the Chilean family of naturalists, the Philippis, Rodolfo Amando Philippi (1808-1904), the German-Chilean paleontologist and zoologist, his brother Bernhard Eunom Philippi (1811-1852) or Rudolfo's son, Federico Philippi (1838-1910).
