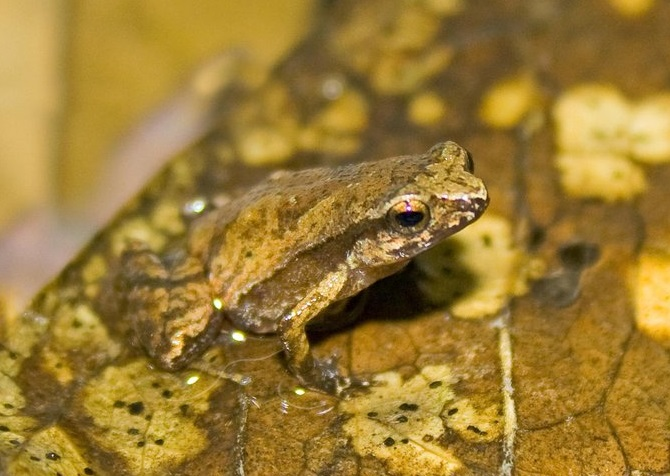

Conservation status
- Least Concern (IUCN 3.1)

Scientific classification
- Kingdom: Animalia
- Phylum: Chordata
- Class: Amphibia
- Order: Anura
- Family: Leptodactylidae
- Genus: Physalaemus
- Species: P. atlanticus

Binomial name
- Physalaemus atlanticus Haddad & Sazima, 2004

= Physalaemus atlanticus =

Species of frog

Physalaemus atlanticus is a species of frog in the family Leptodactylidae. It is endemic to Brazil.

== Description ==
The adult male frog measures 20.1 22.1 mm in snout-vent length and the adult female frog 21.0-23.9 mm long. Its belly is orange in color.

== Habitat ==
This frog is found on the leaf litter in coastal rainforests. Scientists have seen this frog between 0 and 50 m (0 and 164 ft) above sea level.

Most of the frog's known range is inside a protected park, Parque Estadual da Serra do Mar.

== Reproduction ==
This frog deposits its eggs in foam nests in ponds. The nests float on the water or sits on wet leaf litter.

== Threats ==
The IUCN classifies this frog as least concern of dying extinction. Because most of the frog's range is within Serra do Mar, which has large tracts of suitable Atlantic forest habitat, the frog is not in danger. Only about 30 percent of the population is subject to habitat fragmentation and degradation associated with urbanization, both cash crop and small-scale agriculture, silviculture, and livestock cultivation.
