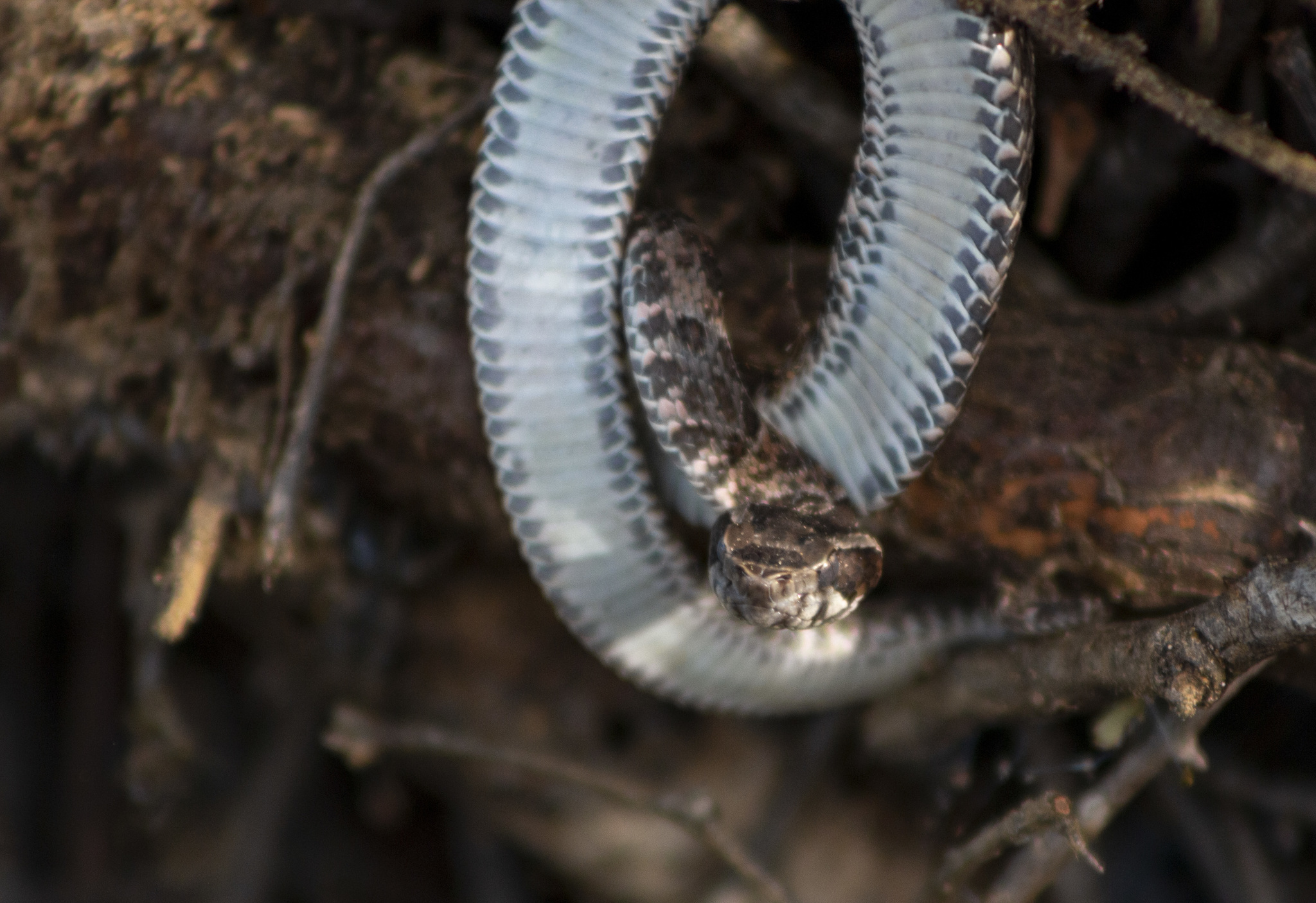

Conservation status
- Least Concern (IUCN 3.1)

Scientific classification
- Kingdom: Animalia
- Phylum: Chordata
- Class: Reptilia
- Order: Squamata
- Suborder: Serpentes
- Family: Viperidae
- Genus: Bothrops
- Species: B. erythromelas

Binomial name
- Bothrops erythromelas Amaral, 1923
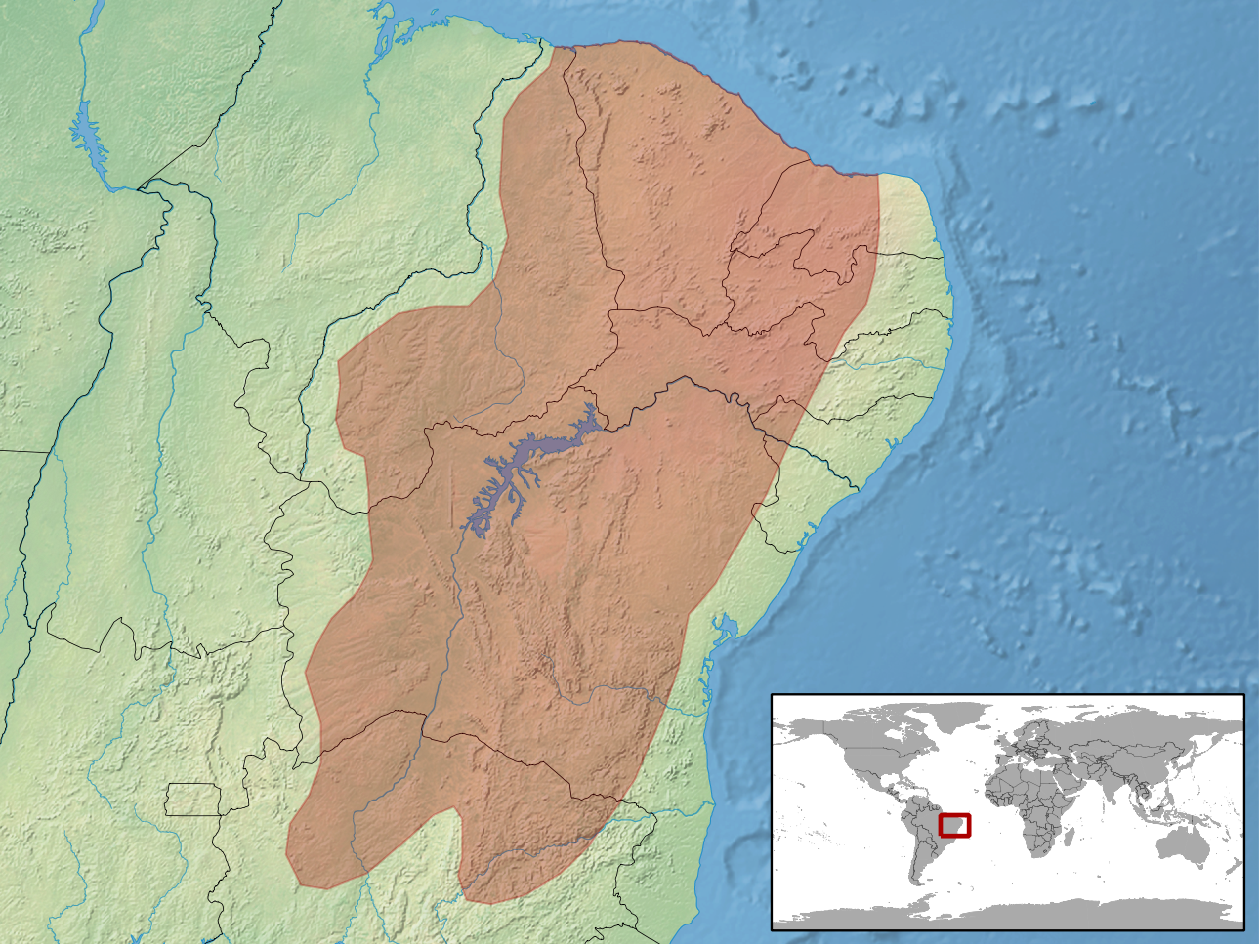

Synonyms
- Bothropoides erythromelas – Fenwick et al., 2009

= Bothrops erythromelas =

Species of snake

Bothrops erythromelas, commonly known as the Caatinga lancehead or the jararaca-da-seca, is a species of venomous snake in the family Viperidae. It is endemic to Brazil.

== Etymology ==
The specific name, erythromelas, is from the Ancient Greek words έρυθρός (érythrós), meaning "red", and μέλας (mélas), meaning "black", referring to this snake's coloration.

== Geographic range ==
It is found in the Brazilian states of Alagoas, Bahia, Ceará, Maranhão, Minas Gerais, Paraíba, Pernambuco, Piauí, Rio Grande do Norte, and Sergipe.

The type locality is "near Juazeiro, State of Bahia, Brazil".

== Description ==
Adults may attain a total length of 54 cm (21 in), which includes a tail 6.5 cm (2.6 in) long. Can grow to a maximum of about 0.85 m.

Dorsally, B. erythromelas is reddish brown, with a double series of black or dark brown triangular markings, which may be alternating or opposite. The head is dark brown on the top and sides, with some darker markings. Ventrally, it is yellowish, speckled with brown, and with dark spots extending from the sides of the ventrals onto the first two dorsal rows. Eyes are moderately large in size, with vertically elliptical pupils.

The strongly keeled dorsal scales are arranged in 21 rows at midbody. Ventrals 144–155; anal plate entire; subcaudals divided 33–35. It's mainly a terrestrial and nocturnal snake, but climb into low vegetation. Tend to hide its head when approached. Highly irascible, can strike violently with minimal provocation. Feeds mainly on rodents and lizards.

== Habitat ==
This species' common name refers to its habitat, the Caatinga, a large ecoregion in northeastern Brazil, which consists of xeric shrubland and thorn forest.
