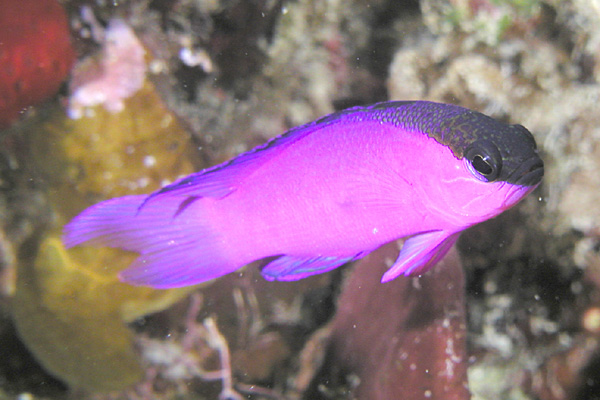

Conservation status
- Least Concern (IUCN 3.1)

Scientific classification
- Kingdom: Animalia
- Phylum: Chordata
- Class: Actinopterygii
- Order: Blenniiformes
- Family: Grammatidae
- Genus: Gramma
- Species: G. melacara

Binomial name
- Gramma melacara J. E. Böhlke & J. E. Randall, 1963

= Blackcap basslet =

Species of fish

The blackcap basslet (Gramma melacara), or blackcap gramma, is a species of fish inhabiting reefs in the tropical western Atlantic Ocean. It prefers vertical surfaces with crevices in which it can hide. It can be found at depths from 10 to 180 metres (33 to 591 ft) (usually between 20 and 60 metres (66 and 197 ft)). This species can also be found in the aquarium trade.

== Appearance ==
A small fish, reaching a length of 10 centimetres (3.9 in) TL, it is purple with a diagonal black cap on its head. The body colour varies from magenta to purple, and there is a jet-black diagonal cap running from the lip to the fore dorsal fin. The largest scientifically measured blackcap gramma was 10.0 cm / 3.9 inches.

== In the aquarium ==
A hardy fish, it is typically peaceful and can be kept in a reef aquarium. Care should be taken, however, to only add one fish to an aquarium, as they are territorial and do not accept other members of the same, or similar looking species in the same aquarium. Small shrimp also may get eaten by this fish. Since it likes to hide, it should only be kept in an aquarium with large amounts of live rock. When these fish are frightened, they hide among rocks.

An aquarium that is 30 gallons or larger is ideal. If it is desired to keep more than one in an aquarium, a tank that is at least 6 feet in length should be used and they should be added at the same time. It is not advisable to house the blackcap gramma in an aquarium smaller than 30 gallons (115 litres). A lot of rocks, crevices and caves in the set up is ideal. Since it is commonly found in deep waters, it is best to avoid sharp aquarium lights. The blackcap gramma is considered reef compatible, and is commonly kept in reef aquariums. It should be kept in mind, however, that it might devour small invertebrates, such as copepods, amphipods, and isopods. The blackcap gramma can start acting territorially towards other fishes, including members of its own species, once it has settled in an aquarium. The recommended water temperature for blackcap gramma is 72–78 °F (22–26 °C). Keep the specific gravity at 1.020-1.025 and the pH-value between 8.1 and 8.4. The blackcap gramma is a carnivorous species that needs to be kept on a meaty diet in the aquarium. It will normally accept dead food, and it can be fed mysid shrimp, fish flesh, crustacean flesh, and mixed frozen preparations suitable for marine carnivores.
