= Bothrops otavioi =

Scientific classification
- Kingdom: Animalia
- Phylum: Chordata
- Class: Reptilia
- Order: Squamata
- Suborder: Serpentes
- Family: Viperidae
- Genus: Bothrops
- Species: B. otavioi

Binomial name
- Bothrops otavioi Barbo, Grazziotin, Sazima, Martins, & Sawaya, 2012

Species of endangered pit viper

Bothrops otavioi, also known as Jararaca-de-Vitória in Portuguese, is an endangered species of pit viper from Vitória Island, São Paulo, Brazil. It is considered one of the top 30 most endangered viper species, possibly critically. The species is named after Otavio A. V. Marques, a prominent herpetologist at the Instituto Butantan. Similarly, the English name 'Vitória's Lancehead' has been suggested for common use.

== Description ==
Bothrops otavioi is similar B. jararaca and is distinguishable by its smaller males, fewer and larger intersupraocular scales, fewer ventral scales in females, fewer subcaudal scales in males, fewer and more rounded anterior cephalic scales and differences in male genitalia.

B. otavioi can also be distinguished from B. alcatraz by its fewer intersupraoculars, more ventrals, more subcaudals in males as well as its longer tail and head. It can also be distinguished from B. insularis by its brown colours, fewer intersupraoculars and anterior cephalic scales as well as its smaller males.

The species is characterised by its brown colouration as well as its black tail tips.

At 38.8 cm snout-vent length, B. otavioi males reach sexual maturity while females reach maturity at 69.2 cm.

== Diet/behaviour ==
Bothrops otavioi is arboreal and nocturnal, it is also known to eat small hylid frogs. It is likely that the species uses its dark tail tips to lure in frogs, as other Bothrops species are known to do, as their tails often bear scarring.
