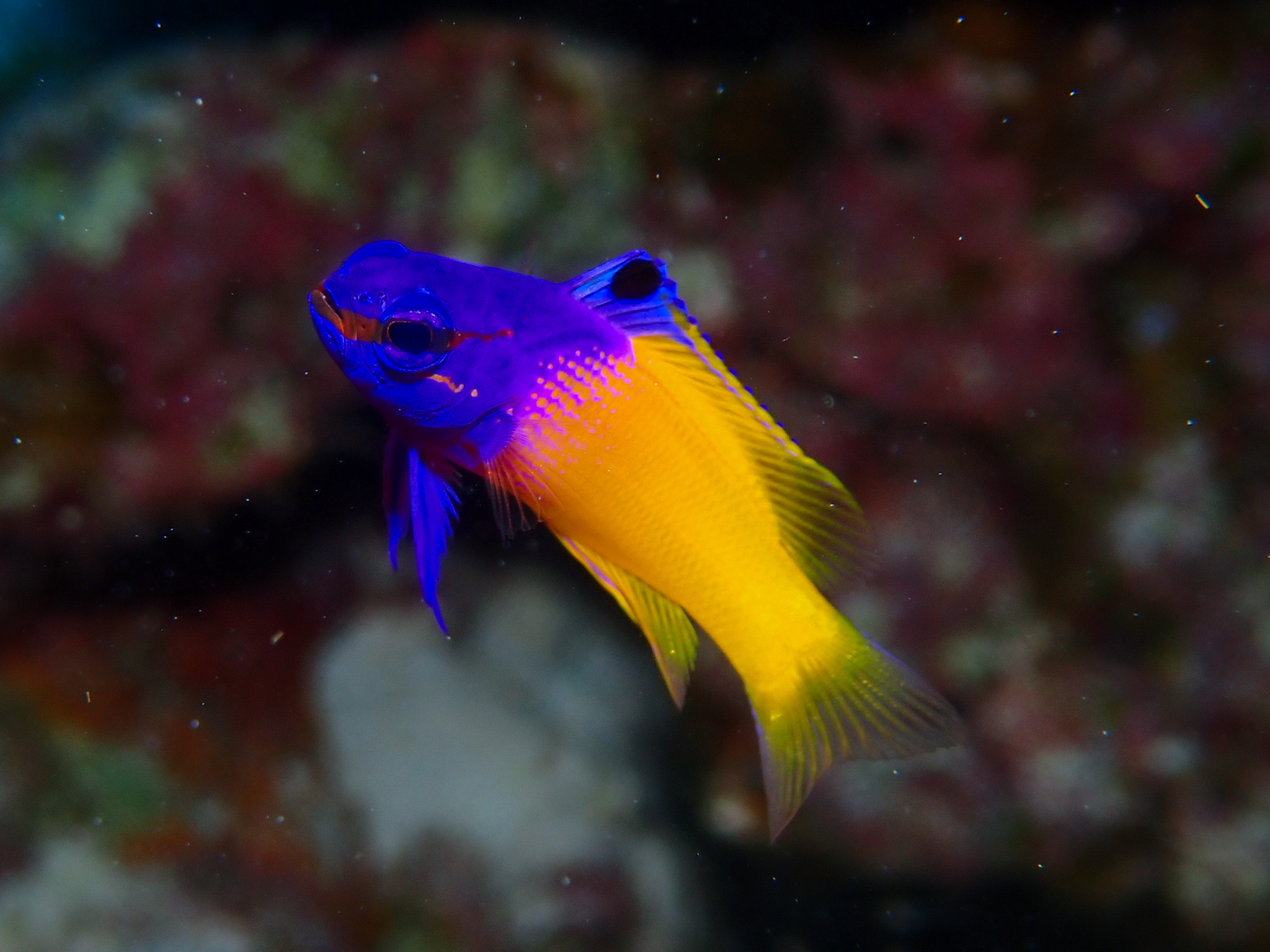
- Royal gramma (Gramma loreto)

Scientific classification
- Kingdom: Animalia
- Phylum: Chordata
- Class: Actinopterygii
- Order: Blenniiformes
- Family: Grammatidae; D. S. Jordan & Evermann, 1896

Genera
- Gramma; Lipogramma

Synonyms
- Grammidae

= Grammatidae =

Family of fishes

Grammatidae is a small family of ray-finned fishes which were formerly placed in the order Perciformes or as indeterminate percomorphs, but are now considered blenniiforms. They are commonly known as basslets. They are marine fish found in the tropical western Atlantic Ocean.

They are characterized in part by a broken or absent lateral line. The largest species reach around 10 centimeters in maximum length.

Some basslets are colorful and are kept in marine aquaria.

There are two genera:

- Gramma
- Lipogramma

A number of other species may be called "basslets", in particular members of Serranidae, where they may be called "fairy basslets".

== Gallery ==
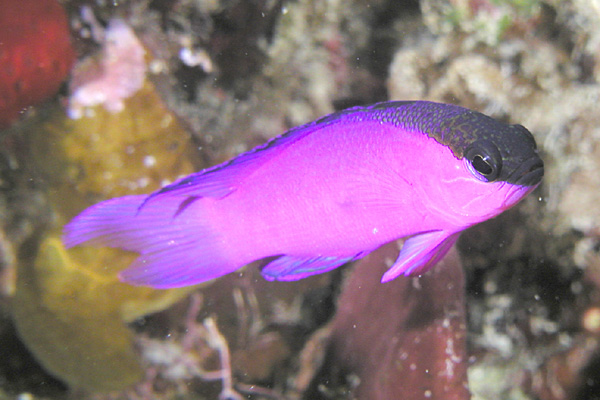
Gramma melacara

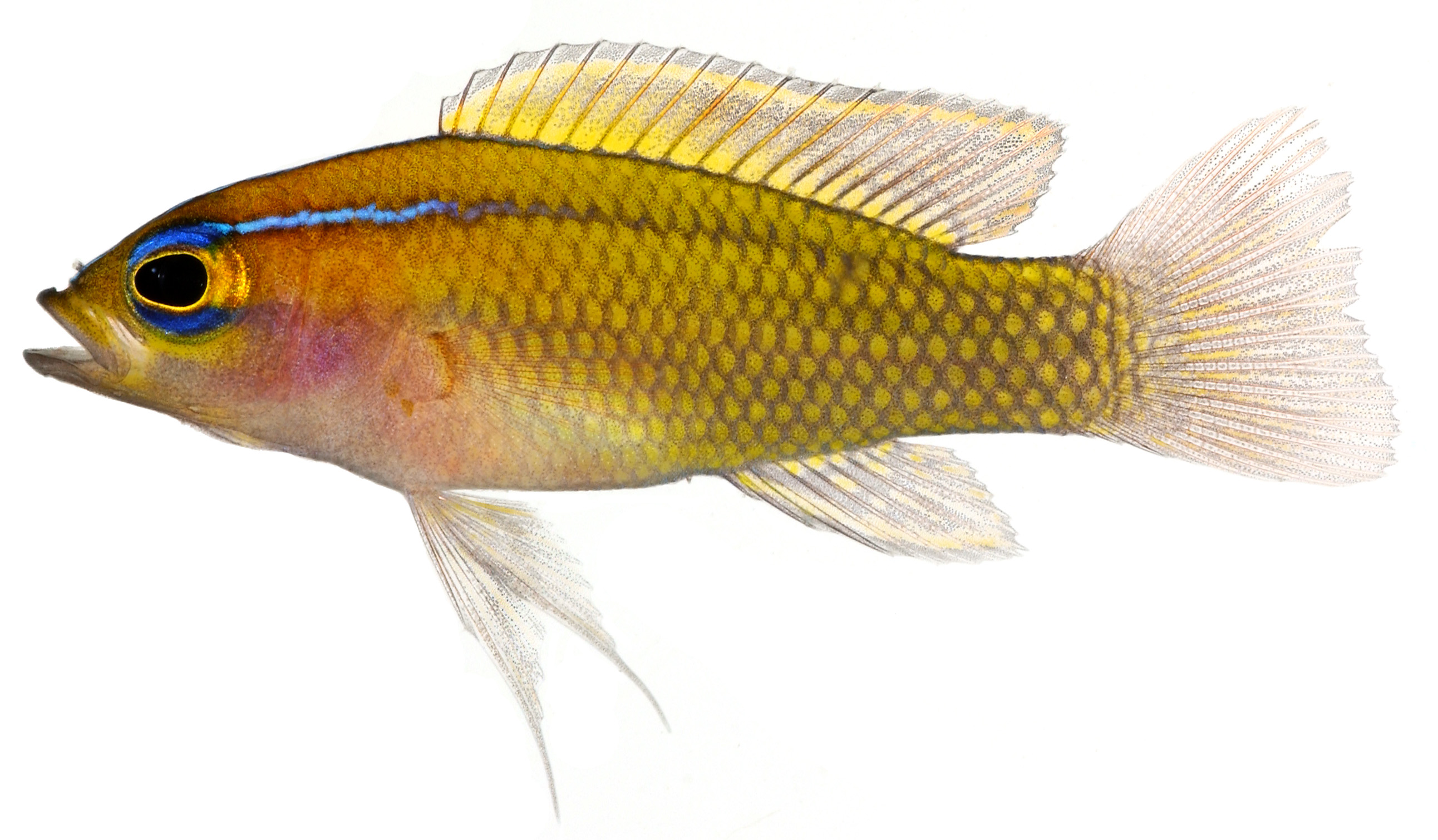
Lipogramma trilineata
