= Ivan Sazima =

Ivan Petr Sazima
- Born: 7 October 1942 (age 83); Prague, Protectorate of Bohemia and Moravia
- Education: Universidade de São Paulo
- Known for: Studies on the biology and behavior of vertebrates, including reef and freshwater fishes, reptiles, amphibians, and birds
- Scientific career
- Fields: Zoology
- Workplaces: Universidade Estadual de Campinas

Ivan Petr Sazima (born 7 October 1942) is a Czech-born Brazilian zoologist. His work focuses mainly on the biology and behavior of vertebrates.

== Biography ==
Sazima was born on 7 October 1942 in Prague. He began studying zoology in 1968 at the Universidade de São Paulo, where he earned a bachelor's degree in 1971 and a Master of Science in 1975. In 1980, under the supervision of Claudio Gilberto Froehlich, he received his Doctor of Science degree with the dissertation Estudo comparativo de algumas espécies de peixes lepidófagos (Osteichthyes). From 1984 to 1985, he completed a postdoctoral fellowship at the Ruhr University Bochum in Germany.

From March 1973 until February 2008, Sazima worked at the Institute of Biology of the Universidade Estadual de Campinas. He is now professor emeritus at the Museu de Zoologia of the same university (ZUEC).

Sazima’s research interests cover vertebrate zoology, with a particular focus on the natural history and behavior of reef and freshwater fishes, reptiles and amphibians of the Mata Atlântica, as well as birds from both urban areas and the Atlantic Forest. He has also studied vertebrate pollination, associations between fishes and whales, symbiotic cleaning interactions among vertebrates, bird–mammal associations, and interactions between vertebrates and insects.

He is married to the botanist Marlies Sazima (born 1948), who conducted influential studies on pollination biology in the 1980s. Their daughter Christina is also a zoologist.

== Species described ==
Sazima has co-described numerous species of amphibians, reptiles, birds, and fishes, including:

- Bokermannohyla nanuzae (Bokermann & Sazima, 1973)
- Bothrops alcatraz (Marques, Martins & Sazima, 2002)
- Bothrops otavioi (Barbo, Grazziotin, Sazima, Martins & Sawaya, 2012)
- Corydoras desana (Lima & Sazima, 2017)
- Cycloramphus faustoi (Brasileiro, Haddad, Sawaya & Sazima, 2007)
- Cycloramphus juimirim (Haddad & Sazima, 1989)
- Elacatinus figaro (Sazima, Moura & Rosa, 1997)
- Elacatinus phthirophagus (Sazima, Carvalho-Filho & Sazima, 2008)
- Gramma brasiliensis (Sazima, Gasparini & Moura, 1998)
- Hylodes otavioi (Sazima & Bokermann, 1983)
- Ischnocnema juipoca (Sazima & Cardoso, 1978)
- Labrisomus conditus (Sazima, Carvalho-Filho, Gasparini & Sazima, 2009)
- Labrisomus cricota (Sazima, Gasparini & Moura, 2002)
- Leptodactylus camaquara (Sazima & Bokermann, 1978)
- Leptodactylus cunicularius (Sazima & Bokermann, 1978)
- Leptodactylus furnarius (Sazima & Bokermann, 1978)
- Leptodactylus jolyi (Sazima & Bokermann, 1978)
- Leptodactylus tapiti (Sazima & Bokermann, 1978)
- Lonchophylla bokermanni (Sazima, Vizotto & Taddei, 1978)
- Lonchophylla dekeyseri (Taddei, Vizotto & Sazima, 1983)
- Malacoctenus zaluari (Carvalho-Filho, Gasparini & Sazima, 2020)
- Phasmahyla jandaia (Bokermann & Sazima, 1978)
- Physalaemus atlanticus (Haddad & Sazima, 2004)
- Physalaemus deimaticus (Sazima & Caramaschi, 1988)
- Proceratophrys cururu (Eterovick & Sazima, 1998)
- Proceratophrys palustris (Giaretta & Sazima, 1993)
- Scarus zelindae (Moura, Figueiredo & Sazima, 2001)
- Scinax curicica (Pugliese, Pombal & Sazima, 2004)
- Scinax machadoi (Bokermann & Sazima, 1973)
- Scinax maracaya (Cardoso & Sazima, 1980)
- Scinax pinimus (Bokermann & Sazima, 1973)
- Sparisoma rocha (Pinheiro, Gasparini & Sazima, 2010)
- Tantilla boipiranga (Sawaya & Sazima, 2003)
- Teleocichla centisquama (Zuanon & Sazima, 2002)
- Thoropa megatympanum (Caramaschi & Sazima, 1984)
- Trichomycterus maracaya (Bockmann & Sazima, 2004)

== Eponymous taxa ==
Several species have been named in honor of Sazima, including the tarantula Lasiocyano sazimai (formerly Pterinopelma sazimai), which he collected the holotype of in 1971. Other species named after him include the frogs Hylodes sazimai and Bokermannohyla sazimai, the snakes Dipsas sazimai and Bothrops sazimai, the fishes Deuterodon sazimai, Roeboides sazimai, and Halichoeres sazimai, and the stonefly Kempnyia sazimai.

== Selected works ==
- A vida dos peixes em Fernando de Noronha, 2013
- Serpentes da Caatinga: Guia Ilustrado, 2017
- Serpentes da Mata Atlântica: guia ilustrado para as florestas costeiras do Brasil, 2019
- Anfíbios anuros da Serra do Cipó, Minas Gerais, Brasil, 2020
- Voando por aí: a história natural das aves em um parque ecológico na área urbana de Campinas, sudeste do Brasil, 2020
