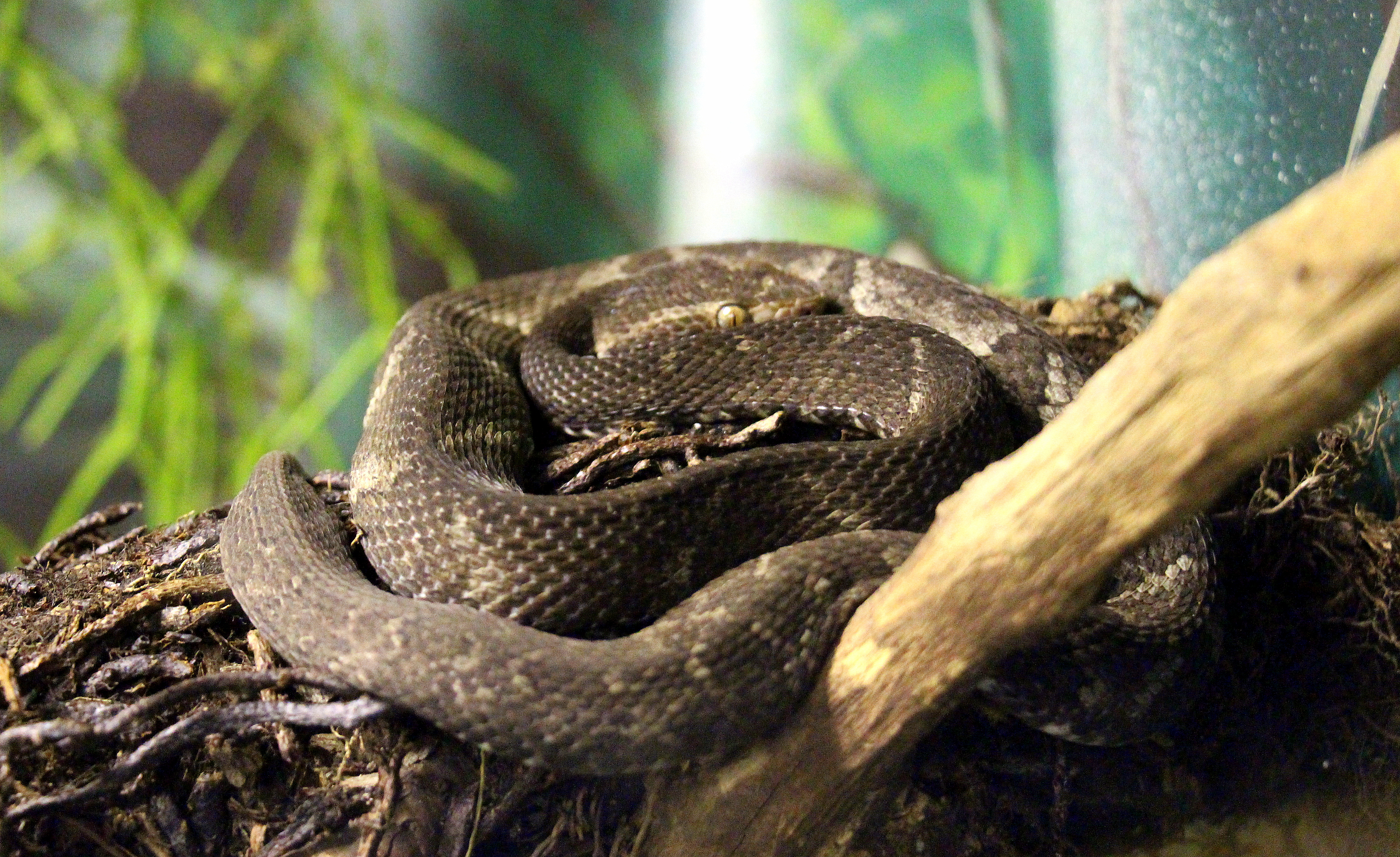

Conservation status
- Vulnerable (IUCN 3.1)

Scientific classification
- Kingdom: Animalia
- Phylum: Chordata
- Class: Reptilia
- Order: Squamata
- Suborder: Serpentes
- Family: Viperidae
- Genus: Bothrops
- Species: B. alcatraz

Binomial name
- Bothrops alcatraz Marques, Martins & Sazima, 2002

Synonyms
- Lachesis lanceolatus – Luederwaldt & Fonseca, 1923; Bothrops alcatraz – Marques, Martins & Sazima, 2002

= Bothrops alcatraz =

Species of snake

Bothrops alcatraz, also known as the Alcatrazes lancehead, is a pitviper species found only on the Alcatrazes Islands off the coast of southeastern Brazil. It eats small lizards, centipedes and amphibians. No subspecies are currently recognized. Like all pit vipers, it is venomous.

== Description ==
Grows to a maximum size of 46.2/50.5 cm for males/females. Its small size and relatively large eyes are considered paedomorphic (juvenile) characteristics. Until 15,000 years ago, only common Bothrops lived by the island, which was at that time still connected to the continent due to the receded sea waters. When the sea rose back again (with the end of the last glacial period) and the mountain returned to its archipelago status, the Bothrops that became isolated there quickly fed on all available rodents, which are its main food. They ended up resorting to cockroaches and scolopendra and, due to their much smaller nutritional value, the snakes slowly shrunk their size until they couldn't grow beyond 50 cm – a process known as allopatric speciation.

== Geographic range ==
Found only on Ilha Alcatrazes, 35 km off the coast of São Paulo, southeastern Brazil. This island, which has a total area of only 1.35 km², is one of four islands than make up the Alcatrazes Archipelago. The type locality given is therefore the same: "Alcatrazes Island, (24°06'S, 45°42'W), São Sebastião, São Paulo, Brazil".

== Habitat ==
Described as "low Atlantic Forest vegetation". The highest point on island is 266 metres (873 ft).

== Conservation status ==
This species is classified as vulnerable on the IUCN Red List. Although Bothrops alcatrazt is relatively abundant on Alcatrazes, its range is very small (less than 1.35 km²), making it vulnerable to stochastic events. Previously, the island was used as a Naval target practice area.
