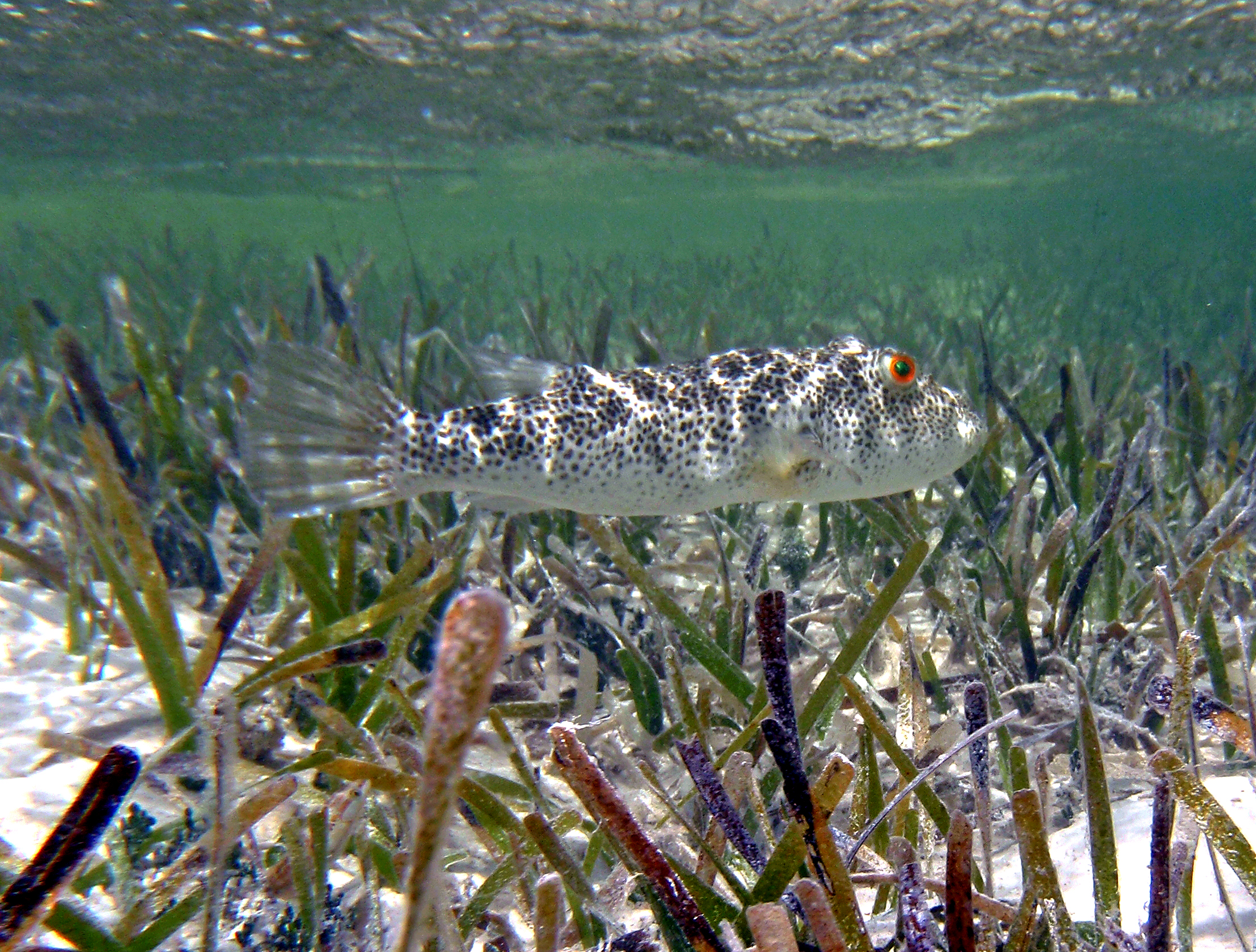

Conservation status
- Least Concern (IUCN 3.1)

Scientific classification
- Kingdom: Animalia
- Phylum: Chordata
- Class: Actinopterygii
- Order: Tetraodontiformes
- Family: Tetraodontidae
- Genus: Sphoeroides
- Species: S. testudineus

Binomial name
- Sphoeroides testudineus (Linnaeus, 1758)

= Checkered puffer =

Species of fish

The checkered puffer (Sphoeroides testudineus) is a species in the family Tetraodontidae, or pufferfishes.

- Normal sizes: 4 to 7 in. (10 to 18 cm)
- Travel / Living Depth: 3– 35 ft. (1-12m).
- Location and Distribution: Caribbean, The Bahamas, Florida, and Gulf of Mexico.

== Description ==
The checkered puffer, Sphoeroides testudineus, is one of several fish species belonging to the family Tetradontidae, meaning "four teeth". Puffers have four tooth plates arranged in quadrants, with two teeth on the bottom and two on the top (Carpenter 2002). These teeth form a strong, heavy beak capable of cracking through hard prey such as mollusks and crustaceans, as well as sipunculids, tunicates, seagrass and detritus. Puffers are named for their ability to swell by swallowing water or air when threatened. They have no spinous dorsal fin, absent or reduced scales, sandpapery denticles on various areas of the body, and a reduced gill opening. Identification of species is determined in part through color, pattern, and the presence and number of spines and fleshy tabs, or lappets, on the skin (Robins & Ray 1986). The checkered puffer is pale tan to yellowish with a polygonal or square network of lines centered on a bulls-eye pattern on the midback in front of the dorsal fin. Lines are dark gray to olive, with small, dark brown spots on cheeks and lower sides. The abdomen is whitish and unmarked. Dark bands are present on the caudal fin.

== Potentially misidentified species ==
Several species of puffers inhabit the waters of the Indian River Lagoon (IRL). In addition to S. testudineus, three other Florida puffer species belong to the genus Sphoeroides are found in the IRL. These include: the northern puffer, S. maculatus; the southern puffer, S. nephelus; and the bandtail puffer, S. spengleri. The northern puffer is olive-gray with many black spots and 6–7 vertical gray areas on the side (Robins & Ray 1986). It has a black bar between the eyes and prickles on the skin of the tail. S. maculatus grows to a maximum length of 36 cm, slightly larger than the checkered puffer. The southern puffer is similar to S. maculatus, but lacks the black spots on the sides and dorsal surface. Instead, pale tan rings or semicircles cover this area, and larger dark spots are variable on the sides. Dark slashes are sometimes present on the lower half of the cheek, and prickles are found on the posterior ventral surface near or at the anus. The bandtail puffer is usually dark brown above, with pale sides and white underneath. A row of large brownish black spots extends from the chin to the caudal-fin base on the lower sides, separate from the dark dorsal color. Many tan, fleshy tabs are present near the rear of the body. At only 18 cm, the reported maximum size for S. spengleri is much less than that of the checkered puffer.

== Habitat and distribution ==
The checkered puffer ranges from Rhode Island to Florida, Bermuda, and the southeast Gulf of Mexico to the southeastern coasts of Brazil (Robins & Ray 1986). It is common in bays, seagrass beds, tidal creeks, mangrove swamps, and into freshwater areas (Figueiredo & Menezes 2000).

The checkered puffer is distributed throughout the IRL. Most populations are found in association with seagrass beds and mangroves, although some individuals occur in rocky intertidal and hardbottom areas as well.

== Life history and population biology ==
Age, Size, Lifespan: Information concerning the maximum age and average lifespan of S. testudineus is lacking. Growth rates vary with environmental conditions, food availability and other factors. The maximum reported size for the checkered puffer is 30 cm (Robins & Ray 1986), but most specimens are much smaller.

Abundance: Little information is available on the abundance of S. testudineus. However, it is a common species found in many estuarine habitats. Juveniles are frequently caught in seagrass beds and around mangrove roots. The checkered puffer is listed as one of eight dominant fish species in coastal waters of Yucatán, Mexico (Vega-Cendejas & de Santillana 2004).
