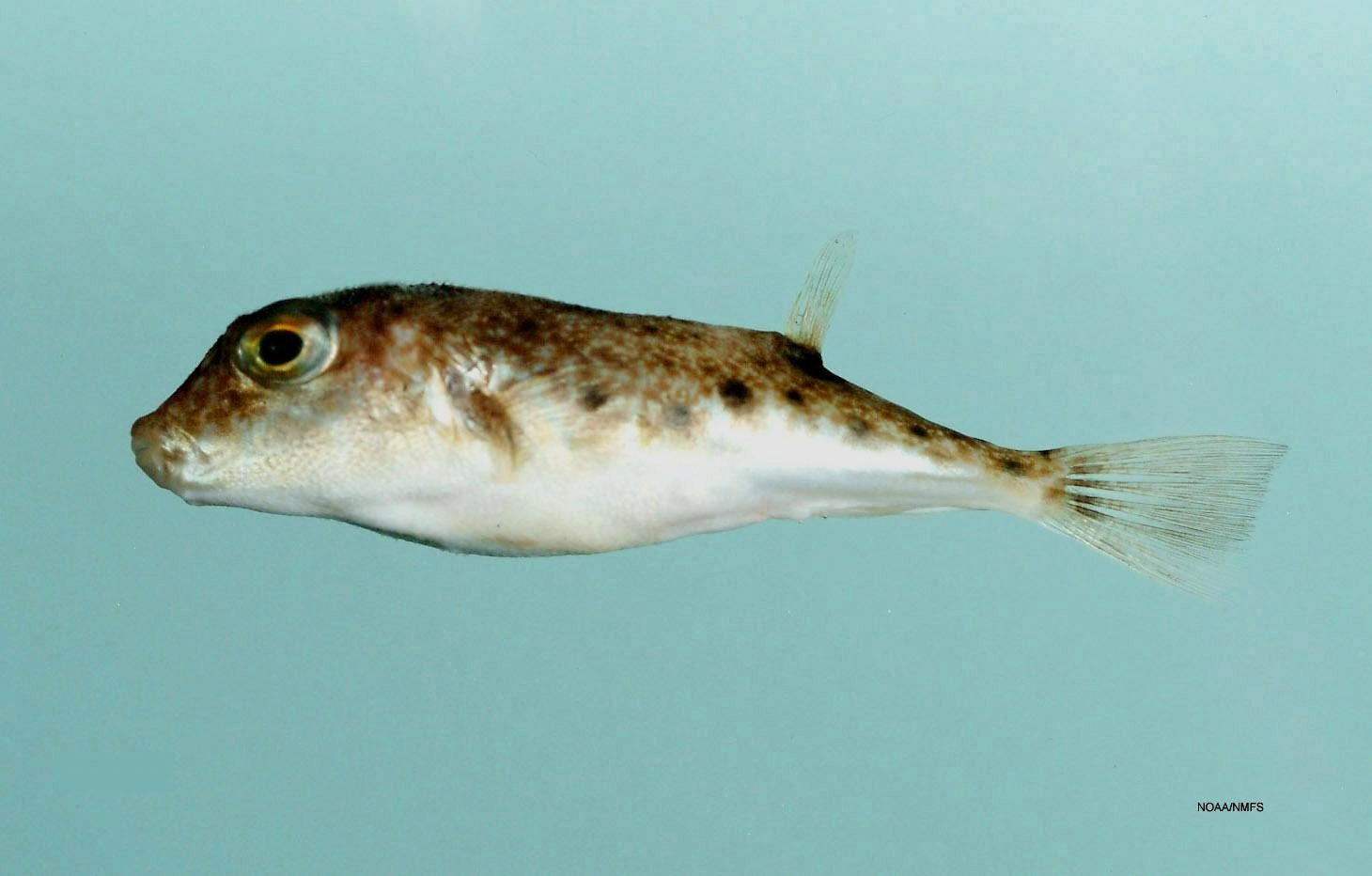

Scientific classification
- Kingdom: Animalia
- Phylum: Chordata
- Class: Actinopterygii
- Order: Tetraodontiformes
- Family: Tetraodontidae
- Genus: Sphoeroides
- Species: S. parvus

Binomial name
- Sphoeroides parvus Shipp & Yerger, 1969

= Least puffer =

Species of fish

Least puffer (Sphoeroides parvus) is a species in the family Tetraodontidae, or pufferfishes. This species is the common bay and inshore puffer for the waters around Texas and Louisiana. It has also been found as far east as Apalachicola Bay and south to Yucatán. Mature least puffers are small, usually less than four inches (100 mm).

== Description ==
Least puffers are tetraodontids, meaning their teeth have fused into beaks with a median division that produces two plates in the upper and lower jaw. Tetraodontids can also be characterized by their lack of fin spines or ribs, and a tough skin that is often covered with small spinulous scales. They typically have dorsal fins containing 8-9 rays and their pectoral rays are usually within the number range of 13-16. Sphoeroides parvus have a caudal fin that can be dusky or plain and they lack pelvic fins entirely. No predominant dark spot is found in axil of the pectoral fin, with the fin's meristics being 13-16 rays. The dorsal side of S. parvus is brownish gray, while a white coloration dominates the venter. There is a ventrolateral row of black blotches, being irregular in size and arrangement, separating the dorsal and ventral colorations. The body has color irregularities of light and dark on the sides and back. A least puffer body is elongate and globular, with their sides often having a golden hue. The interorbital width is typically 25% or more of snout length.

The least puffer is capable of inflating its abdomen with water when frightened or disturbed. It is the smallest known species of Sphoeroides and it most closely resembles S. nephelus and S. maculatus, both of which have overlapping distributions with S. parvus.

== History & Distribution ==
Sphoeroides parvus distribution can range from Apalachicola Bay and westward throughout the Gulf of Mexico. It is considered the dominant species of puffer in the muddy waters of Mobile Bay and westward. Its dominance is replaced by S. nephelus in the clearer waters of northwestern Florida. S. parvus is most closely allied morphologically to S. maculatus, which is found in the Atlantic from Canada to northeastern Florida. It is believed that prior to existence of the Florida peninsula, the progenitor species of S. parvus and S. maculatus was distributed along the southern coast of the United States. The emergence of this peninsula split the population in two, one species isolated in the Atlantic and the other in the Gulf.

The least puffer has been recorded from very shallow waters to depths of up to 50 m.

== Habitat & Assessment of Concern ==
S. parvus is generally considered abundant and common in coastal, bay, and estuarine waters, over sandy and mud bottoms. This preference makes the least puffer commonly taken as by-catch during inshore shrimp trawls. This species is not utilized or targeted for any reason and its range overlaps with several marine protected areas. For this reason, Sphoeroides parva is listed as Least Concern.

== See also ==
- Tetraodontidae
- Sphoeroides
- Sphoeroides nephelus
- Sphoeroides maculatus
