= João Lopes =

João Lopes may refer to:

- João Lopes Bank, Portuguese seamount in Santa Maria, Portugal
- João Simões Lopes Neto (1865-1916), Brazilian regionalist writer
- João Lopes (equestrian) (1919-2015), Portuguese equestrian
- João Lopes Marques (born 1971), Portuguese-Estonian writer and blogger
- João Lopes Filho (born 1943), Cape Verdean anthropologist and historian
- João Pimenta Lopes (born 1980), Portuguese politician
- João Lopes (footballer) (born 1996), Brazilian footballer
