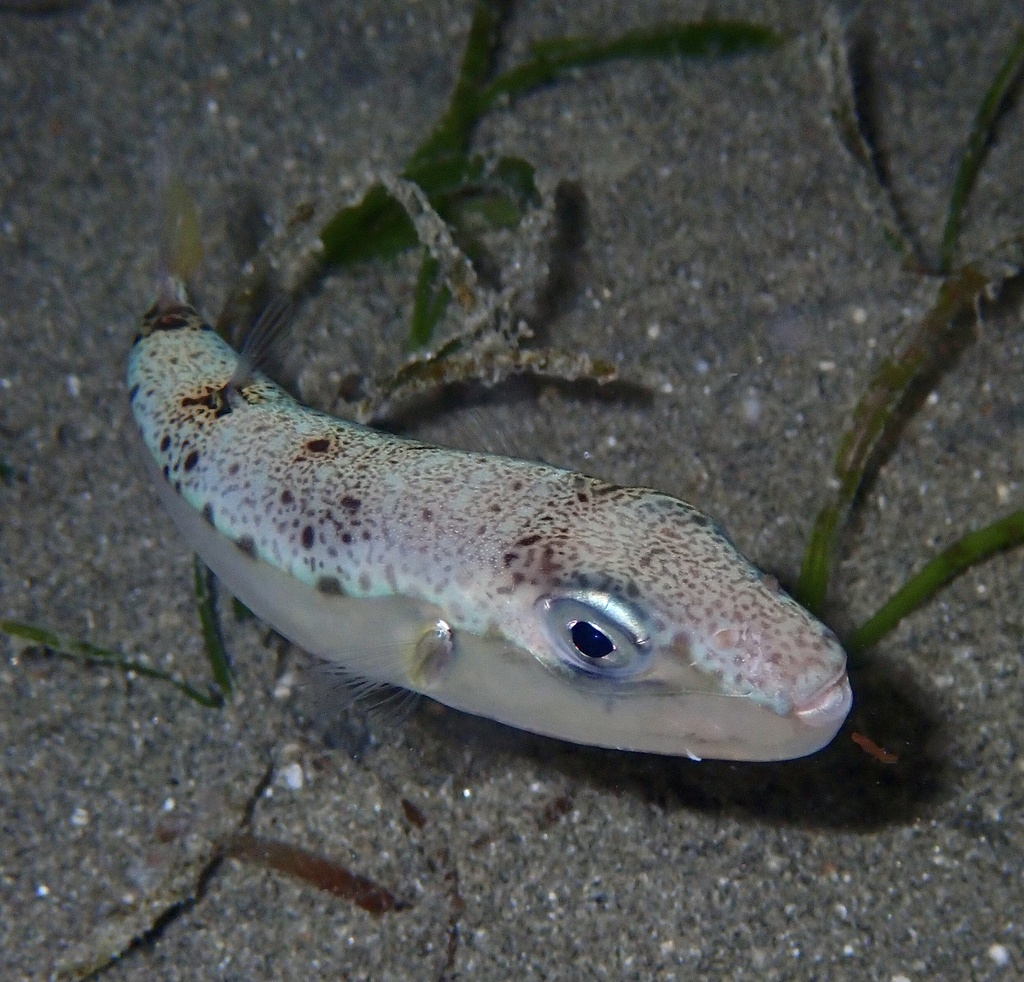

Scientific classification
- Kingdom: Animalia
- Phylum: Chordata
- Class: Actinopterygii
- Order: Tetraodontiformes
- Family: Tetraodontidae
- Genus: Lagocephalus
- Species: L. suezensis

Binomial name
- Lagocephalus suezensis Clark & Gohar, 1953

= Lagocephalus suezensis =

Species of pufferfish

Lagocephalus suezensis is a species of pufferfish of the family Tetraodontidae. It is native to the western Indian Ocean and recorded in the Mediterranean Sea since 1977. It has since spread in the eastern Mediterranean Basin. It reaches 18 cm in total length and inhabits sandy and muddy bottoms down to 40 m. It is often confused with Lagocephalus sceleratus in Australia.
