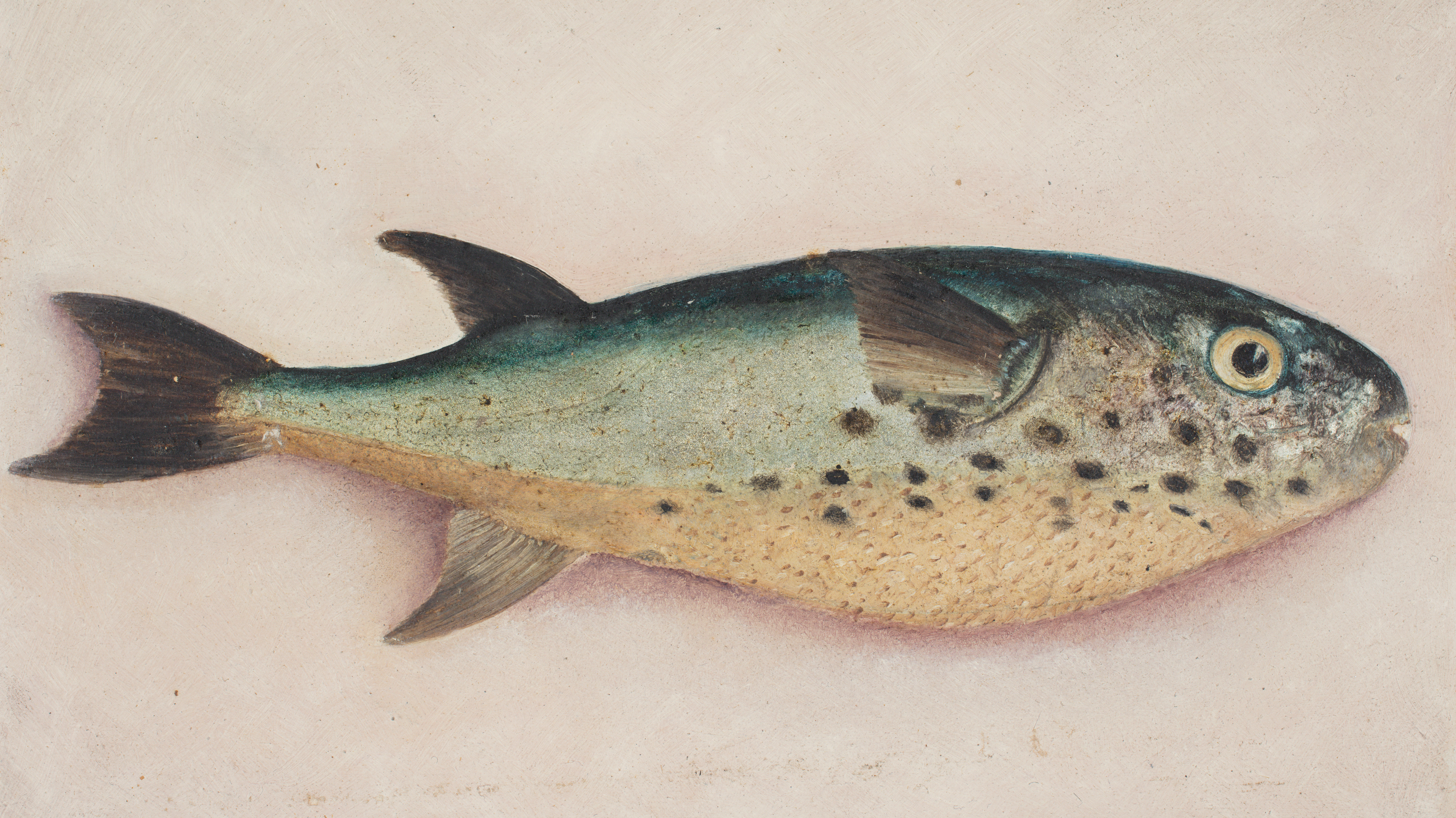

Scientific classification
- Kingdom: Animalia
- Phylum: Chordata
- Class: Actinopterygii
- Order: Tetraodontiformes
- Family: Tetraodontidae
- Genus: Sphoeroides
- Species: S. nitidus

Binomial name
- Sphoeroides nitidus Griffin, 1921

= Sphoeroides nitidus =

Species of fish

Sphoeroides nitidus is a species in the family Tetraodontidae, the pufferfishes. It is native to the Southwest Pacific, where it is known from New Zealand.FishBase, the World Register of Marine Species (WoRMS), and the Catalogue of Life list Sphoeroides nitidus as a valid species, whereas Eschmeyer's Catalog of Fishes treats it as a junior synonym of the oceanic puffer (Lagocephalus lagocephalus).

== Taxonomy ==
Sphoeroides nitidus was first described in 1921 by L. T. Griffin in the paper Descriptions (with illustrations) of four fishes new to New Zealand, published in the Transactions and Proceedings of the New Zealand Institute.The original publication used the name Spheroides nitidus, with the intended genus being Sphoeroides.
