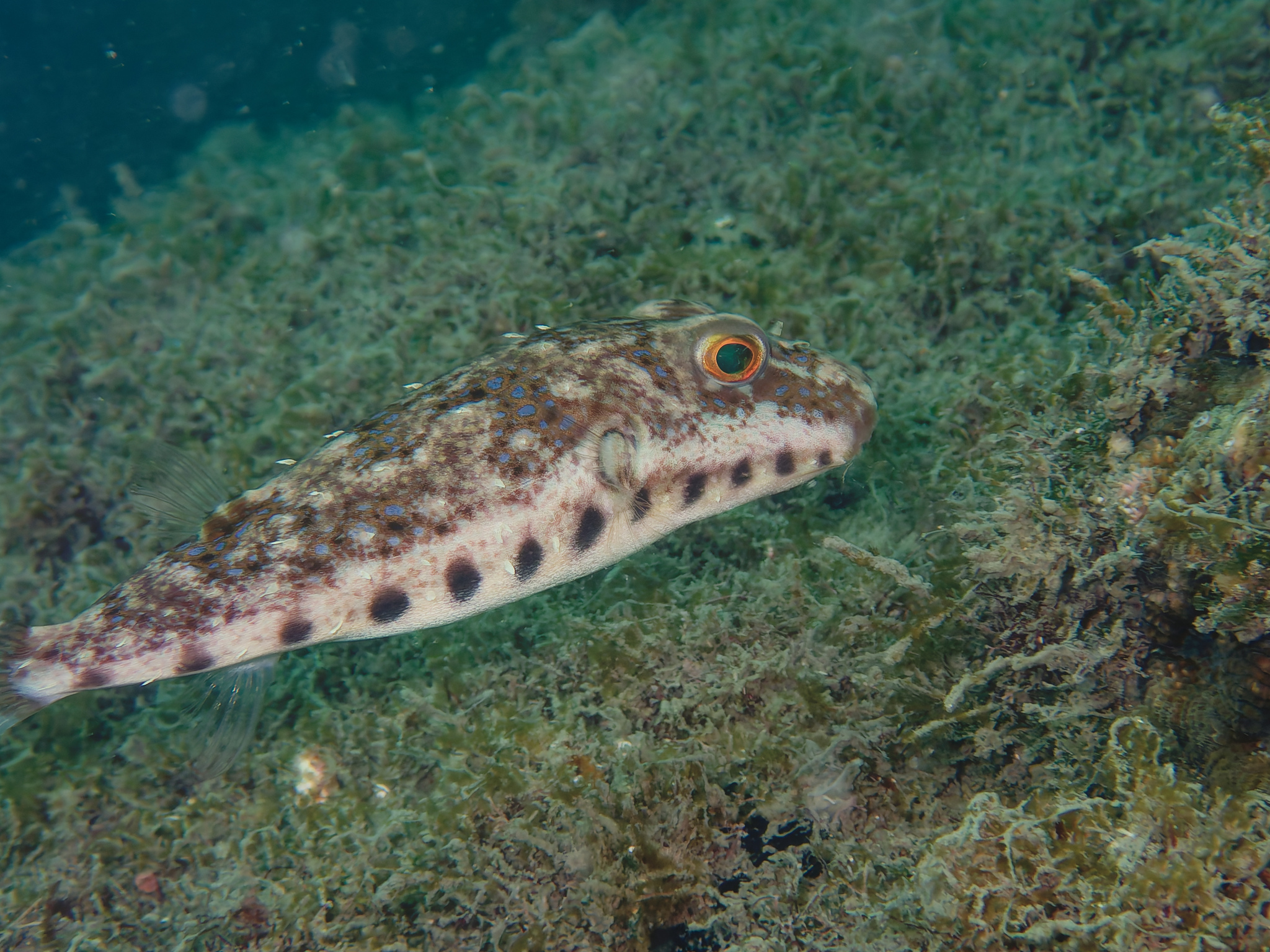

Scientific classification
- Kingdom: Animalia
- Phylum: Chordata
- Class: Actinopterygii
- Order: Tetraodontiformes
- Family: Tetraodontidae
- Genus: Sphoeroides
- Species: S. camila

Binomial name
- Sphoeroides camila P. H. Carvalho, Rotundo, Pitassy & I. Sazima 2023

= Sphoeroides camila =

Species of pufferfish native to the Brazil

Sphoeroides camila is a species of pufferfish native to Brazil. Previously thought to be the bandtail puffer (Sphoeroides spengleri), the species was discovered through DNA analysis. The fish lives in the western Atlantic from northern to southeastern Brazil, and some may be found in the southern Caribbean.

== Physical characteristics ==
Sphoeroides camila possesses several distinctive features, including at least one pair of lappets and blue spots or circles on its back. Usually, it displays 13 tear-shaped spots in a lateral-ventral row, though the number ranges from 11 to 14. The caudal fin's distal bar is wide and has a greenish-yellow hue.

== Habitat ==
Sphoeroides camila is prevalent in shallow and clear reef waters along the Brazilian coast, with depths of up to 20 meters, occasionally extending to 70 meters. It is often seen either alone, in pairs, or small groups, and multiple individuals can be found closely together, hovering over the seabed. Unlike S. spengleri, it is seldom found in seagrass beds, which distinguishes their behavior.

== Diet ==
As a generalist zoobenthivore, Sphoeroides camila feeds on a varied diet, including crustaceans, mollusks, worms, echinoderms, and zooplankton larvae. They also exhibit opportunistic foraging behavior, such as being attracted to mussels opened by a diver or chasing prey stirred up by other creatures.

== Behavior ==
These puffers are diurnal, spending their nights in reef crevices or partially buried on nearby sandy or gravelly bottoms. During this time, they expose their eyes and upper dorsum while seeking shelter.

== Differences from bandtail puffer ==
For over a century, Sphoeroides camila was mistakenly identified as Sphoeroides spengleri. The species share a morphological similarity and, together with Sphoeroides marmoratus from the Eastern Atlantic, they form a complex of closely related species known for the conspicuous lateral row of black marks. These three species share a common ancestor but, due to geographic isolation, have evolved into distinct species.

Sphoeroides camila, in addition to molecular differences, exhibits several distinguishing features from S. spengleri. The new species, S. camila, typically presents at least one pair of well-developed pale lappets on its dorsum, a feature usually absent in S. spengleri. It also displays 24 to 34 lappets on the left sagittal section of its body (compared to 10 to 18 in S. spengleri). The blotches in the lateral-ventral row of S. camila are oblong and vertically tear-shaped at the midbody, while those of S. spengleri are rounded, rarely elongated horizontally. Furthermore, the distal bar of the caudal fin in S. camila is yellowish-green and covers at least 40% of the fin's length, whereas in S. spengleri, it is black and covers no more than 30% of the fin's length.

These two American species also differ in their preferred habitats: S. camila is commonly found in hard substrates such as rocky and coralline reefs, while S. spengleri prefers seagrass beds.

== Etymology ==
The fish is named in honor of Camila Carvalho, daughter of the lead author.
