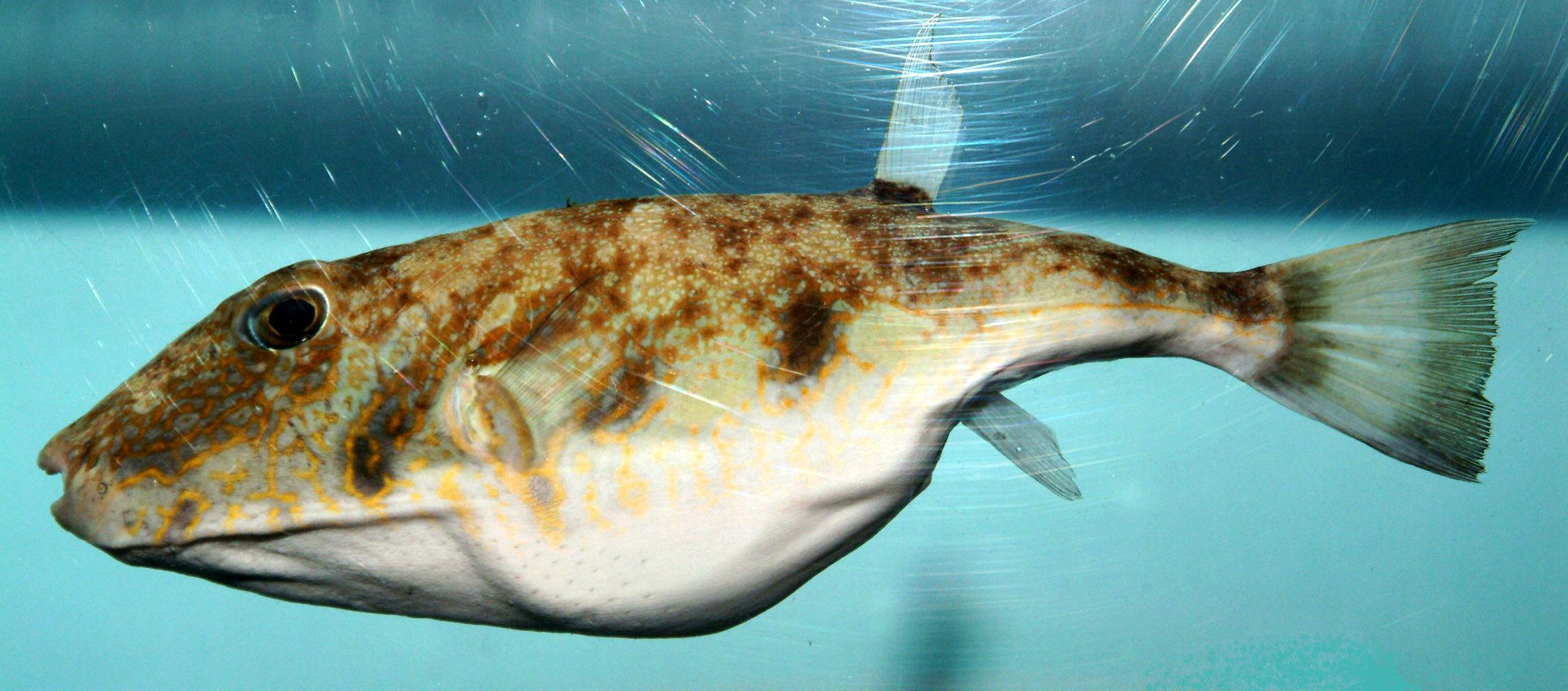
- Sphoeroides dorsalis

Scientific classification
- Kingdom: Animalia
- Phylum: Chordata
- Class: Actinopterygii
- Division: Teleostei
- Order: Tetraodontiformes
- Family: Tetraodontidae
- Subfamily: Tetraodontinae
- Genus: Sphoeroides; Anonymous (Lacépède), 1798

Species
- See text.

Synonyms
- Crayracion Schaeffer, 1760 (Unav.); Spheroides Lacepède, 1800 (Unav.); Orbidus Rafinesque, 1815 (Unav.); Cirrhisomus Swainson, 1839; Leisomus Swainson, 1839; Chelichthys Müller, 1841 (Missp.); Cirrisomus Bonaparte, 1841 (Missp.); Cheilichthys Agassiz, 1845 (Emend.); Cirrhosomus Agassiz, 1846 (Emend.); Crauracium Agassiz, 1846 (Emend.); Sphaeroides Agassiz, 1846 (Emend.); Spheroldes Auctt. (Missp.); Holocanthus Gronow, 1854; Anchisomus Richardson, 1854; Stenometope Bibron, 1855 (Unav.); Crayracion Bleeker, 1865; Uranostoma Bleeker, 1865; Liosaccus Günther, 1870; Thecapteryx Fowler, 1948

= Sphoeroides =

Genus of fishes

Sphoeroides is a genus of pufferfishes.

== Species ==
There are currently 25 recognized species in this genus, which includes the three species FishBase allocates to Colomesus.

- Sphoeroides andersonianus (Morrow, 1957)
- Sphoeroides angusticeps (Jenyns, 1842) (Narrow-headed puffer)
- Sphoeroides annulatus (Jenyns, 1842) (Bullseye puffer)
- Sphoeroides camila (P. H. Carvalho, Rotundo, Pitassy & I. Sazima 2023)
- Sphoeroides dorsalis (Longley, 1934) (Marbled puffer)
- Sphoeroides georgemilleri (Shipp, 1972) (Plaincheek puffer)
- Sphoeroides greeleyi (C. H. Gilbert, 1900) (Green puffer)
- Sphoeroides kendalli (Meek & Hildebrand, 1928) (Slick puffer)
- Sphoeroides lispus (H. J. Walker, 1996) (Naked puffer)
- Sphoeroides lobatus (Steindachner, 1870) (Longnose puffer)
- Sphoeroides maculatus (Bloch & J. G. Schneider, 1801) (Northern puffer)
- Sphoeroides marmoratus (R. T. Lowe, 1838) (Guinean puffer)
- Sphoeroides nephelus (Goode & T. H. Bean, 1882) (Southern puffer)
- Sphoeroides pachygaster (J. P. Müller & Troschel, 1848) (Blunthead puffer)
- Sphoeroides parvus (Shipp & Yerger, 1969) (Least puffer)
- Sphoeroides rosenblatti (W. A. Bussing, 1996)
- Sphoeroides sechurae (Hildebrand, 1946) (Peruvian puffer)
- Sphoeroides spengleri (Bloch, 1785) (Bandtail puffer)
- Sphoeroides testudineus (Linnaeus, 1758) (Checkered puffer)
- Sphoeroides trichocephalus (Cope, 1870) (Pygmy puffer)
- Sphoeroides tyleri (Shipp, 1972) (Bearded puffer)
- Sphoeroides yergeri (Shipp, 1972) (Speckled puffer)

Synonyms

- Sphoeroides nitidus (Griffin, 1921); synonym of Lagocephalus lagocephalus (Linnaeus, 1758)

The following cladogram is based on a 2013 analysis of Tetraodontid mitogenomes:

- Sphoeroides
  - Sphoeroides pachygaster
  - - - Colomesus psittacus
      - Colomesus asellus
    - - Sphoeroides parvus
      - - Sphoeroides annulatus
        - Sphoeroides testudineus
