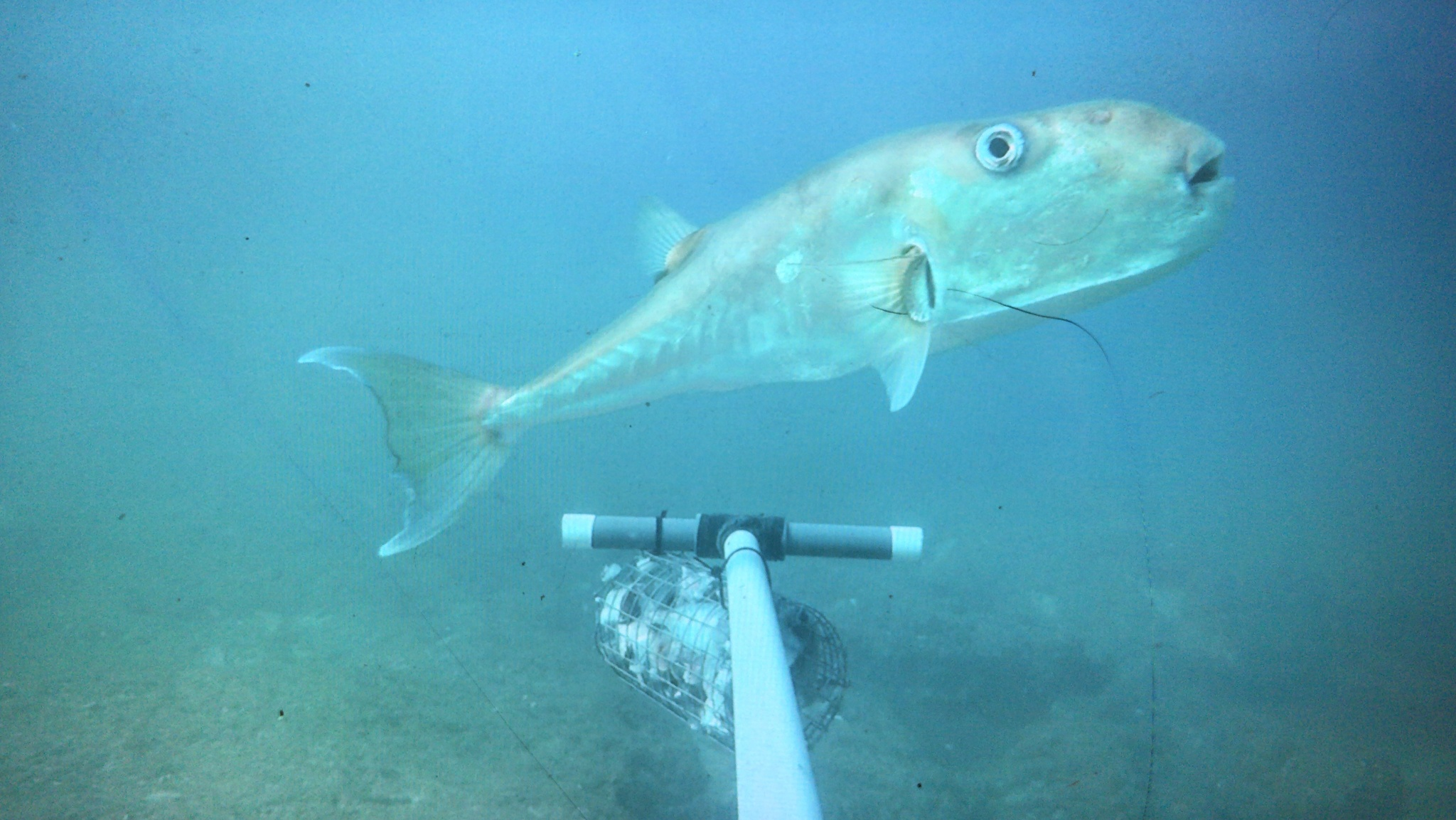

Conservation status
- Least Concern (IUCN 3.1)

Scientific classification
- Kingdom: Animalia
- Phylum: Chordata
- Class: Actinopterygii
- Order: Tetraodontiformes
- Family: Tetraodontidae
- Genus: Lagocephalus
- Species: L. guentheri

Binomial name
- Lagocephalus guentheri Miranda-Ribeiro, 1915

= Diamondback puffer =

Species of fish

The diamondback puffer (Lagocephalus guentheri) is a species of marine ray-finned fish belonging to the family Tetraodontidae, the pufferfishes. This puffer is native to the western Indian Ocean, including the Red Sea, from where it has colonised the Eastern Mediterranean, likely via the Suez Canal.

== Taxonomy ==
The diamondback puffer was first formally described in 1915 by the Brazilian herpetologist and ichthyologist Alípio de Miranda-Ribeiro with its type locality given, probably erroneously. as Brazil. This species is classified in the genus Lagocephalus which belongs to the family Tetraodontidae.

== Etymology ==
The diamonback puffer belongs to the genus Lagocephalus, this name combines lagus, which means "hare", with cephalus, meaning "head". Miranda-Ribeiri did not explain this but it is presumed to be an allusion to the teeth resembling those of lagomorphs. The specific name guentheri, is an eponym which honours the German-born British herpetologist and ichthyologist Albert Günther who, in 1870, has described this taxon as a variety of Tetraodon lunaris.

== Description ==
The diamondback puffer has, like other puffers, an infatable body but when it is deflated it has a rather elongate, deep shape with a round cross section and a flat belly. It has short=bsed dorsal and anal fins which are set far back on the body with the origin of the dorsal fin just to the front of that of the anal fin. The pectoral fins have wide bases with a rounded rear margin and there is no pelvic fin. The large head has a blunt snout and a small mouth which has two large teeth in each jaw. The gill slit is to the front of the pectoral fins. There are no scales on the body, although there are small spinules on the belly and a patch of spiules on the back which does not reach as far back as the margin of the pectoral fin. It has two lateral lines, both of which extend as far as the head and curve round the eye. The adults are dark grey on the back, young are olive-green on the back. The flanks are silvery, frequently showing a gold sheen, and the belly is white. The dorsal and anal fins have no spines but has 13 or 14 soft rays while the anal fin has 12 or 13 soft rays. The caudal fin is slightly emarginate. This species has a maximum total length of 37.4 cm (14.7 in) and a maximum published weight of 495 g (17.5 oz).

== Habitat & distribution ==
Diamondback puffers range from the coasts of South Africa to Pakistan, Japan and northern Australia. They can live in shallow water habitats such as mangroves but on the oceanic shelf they can reach 237 m depth. The species was first introduced in 1930 in the Mediterranean Sea in Greece and is now common in all the eastern Basin.
