= Sphoeroides georgemilleri =

Scientific classification
- Domain: Eukaryota
- Kingdom: Animalia
- Phylum: Chordata
- Class: Actinopterygii
- Order: Tetraodontiformes
- Family: Tetraodontidae
- Genus: Sphoeroides
- Species: S. georgemilleri

Binomial name
- Sphoeroides georgemilleri Shipp, 1972

Species of pufferfish

Sphoeroides georgemilleri, known as the plaincheek puffer, is a species of pufferfish in the family Tetraodontidae. It is known only from the Caribbean Sea off of Colombia, where it occurs at a depth range of 1 to 151 m (3 to 495 ft) and is demersal, inhabiting soft bottoms. It is known to reach at least 12 cm (4.7 inches) in length.
