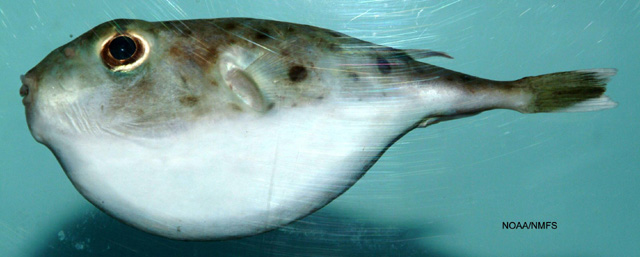

Scientific classification
- Kingdom: Animalia
- Phylum: Chordata
- Class: Actinopterygii
- Order: Tetraodontiformes
- Family: Tetraodontidae
- Genus: Sphoeroides
- Species: S. pachygaster

Binomial name
- Sphoeroides pachygaster (J. P. Müller & Troschel, 1848)

Synonyms
- Tetraodon pachygaster; Liosaccus pachygaster; Liosaccus aerobaticus; Sphoeroides cutaneus; Sphoeroides dubius

= Blunthead puffer =

Species of fish

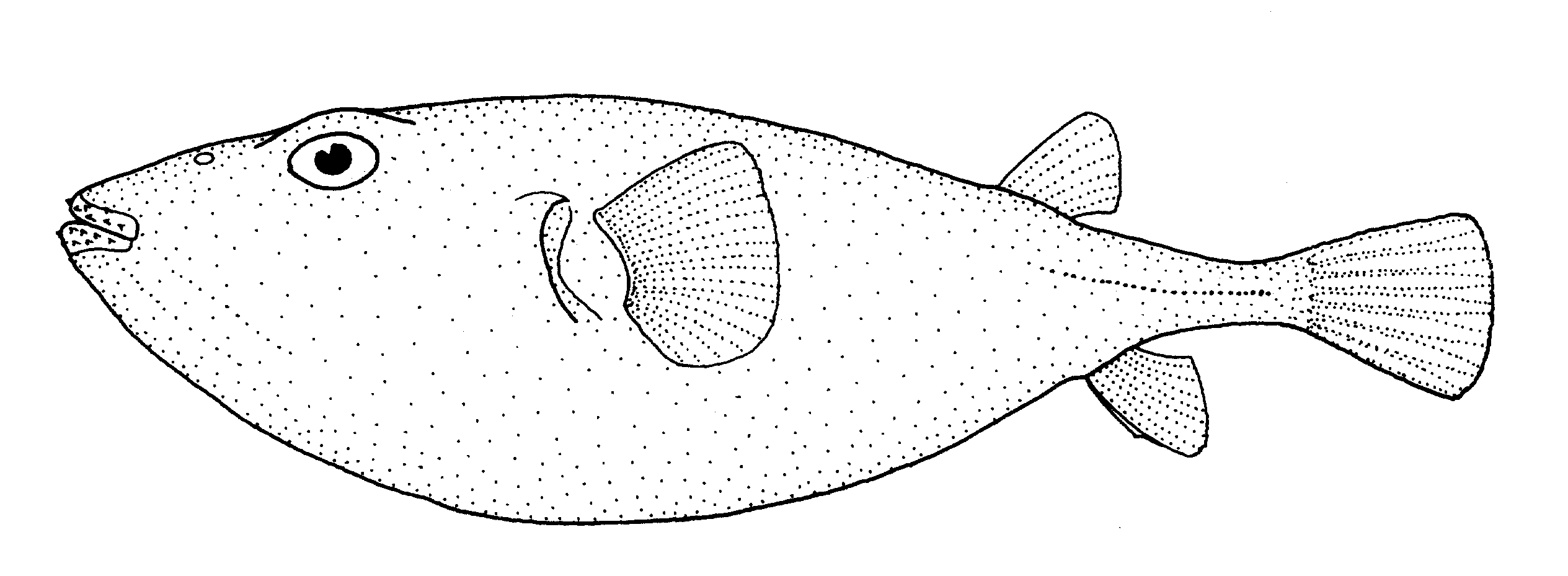
Drawing of S. pachygaster

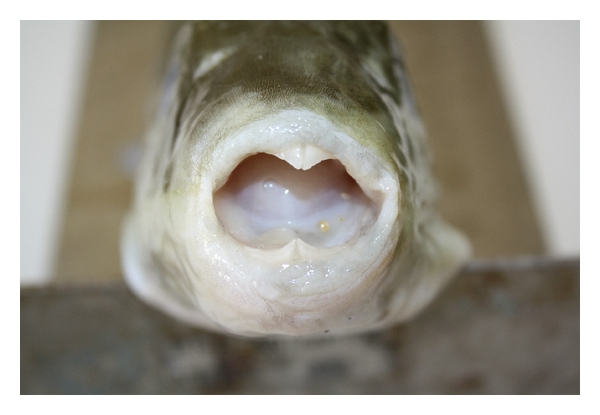
Teeth of S. pachygaster

The blunthead puffer (Sphoeroides pachygaster) is a pufferfish of the family Tetraodontidae up to 40 cm long, found circumglobally in tropical and temperate seas, at depths between 50 and 500 m.

It is considered an invasive species in the Mediterranean Sea, where it was first recorded off the Spanish coast in 1981 after entry via the strait of Gibraltar. It invaded the western basin in following decades, and now reaches eastward the Adriatic Sea, the Aegean Sea and Levantine waters. In 2026 Greece offered a bounty of €5.33 per kilogram in a programme to protect the marine ecosystem.

The fish is edible by humans, and is commonly eaten in Japan, where it is referred to as yorito fugu. Its liver contains dangerous levels of tetrodotoxin, a lethal poison, though less than other species of pufferfish also prepared and eaten, with great care to exclude the liver, as fugu.
