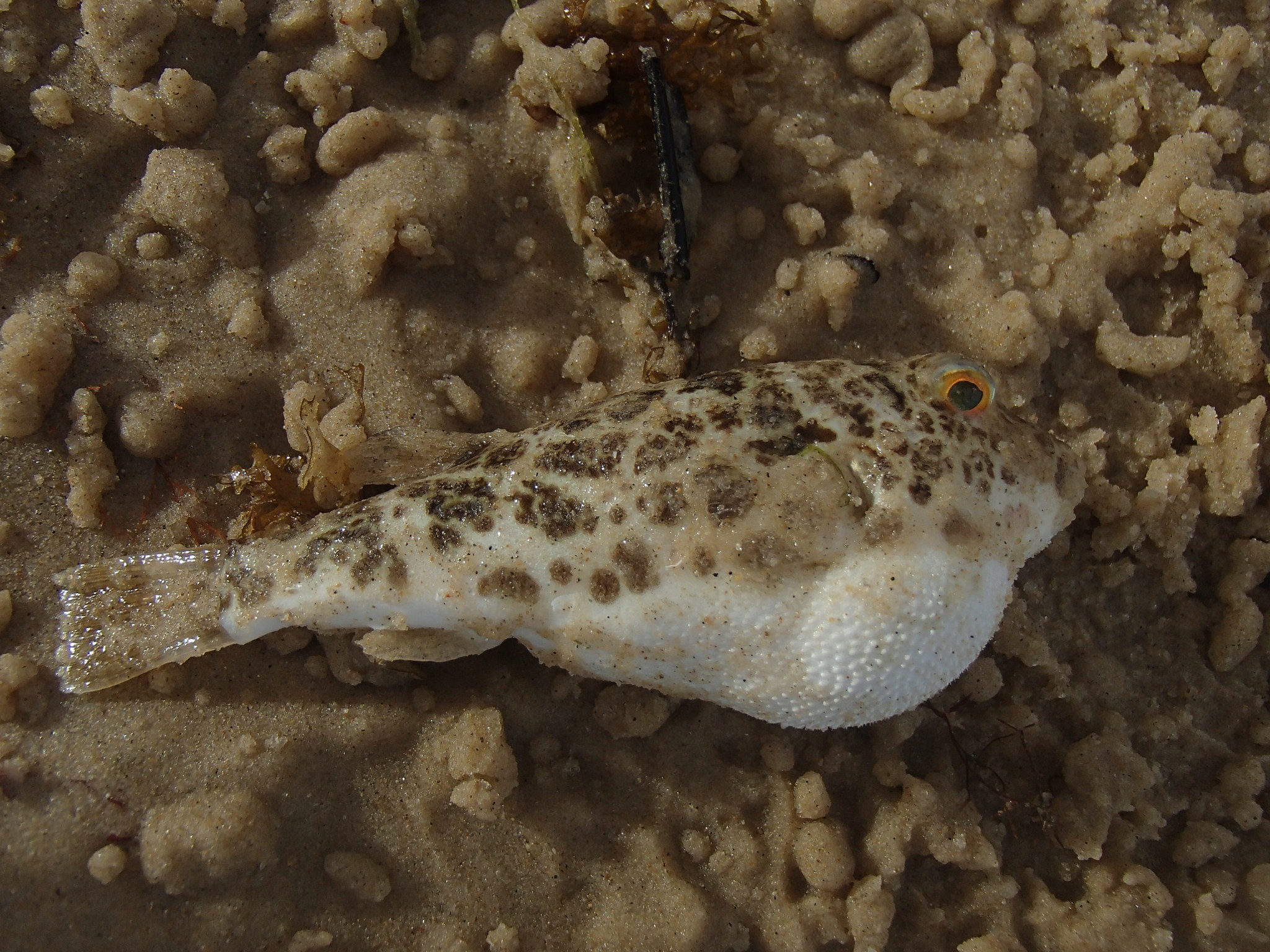

Scientific classification
- Domain: Eukaryota
- Kingdom: Animalia
- Phylum: Chordata
- Class: Actinopterygii
- Order: Tetraodontiformes
- Family: Tetraodontidae
- Genus: Sphoeroides
- Species: S. greeleyi

Binomial name
- Sphoeroides greeleyi Gilbert, 1900

= Sphoeroides greeleyi =

Species of fish

Sphoeroides greeleyi is a fish species described by Charles Henry Gilbert in 1900. Sphoeroides greeleyi is part of the genus Sphoeroides and the pufferfish family Tetraodontidae. No subspecies are listed in the Catalog of Life.
