= Sphoeroides rosenblatti =

Scientific classification
- Kingdom: Animalia
- Phylum: Chordata
- Class: Actinopterygii
- Order: Tetraodontiformes
- Family: Tetraodontidae
- Genus: Sphoeroides
- Species: S. rosenblatti

Binomial name
- Sphoeroides rosenblatti W. A. Bussing, 1996

Species of fish

Sphoeroides rosenblatti is a species in the family Tetraodontidae, or pufferfishes.
