= Speckled puffer =

Conservation status
- Least Concern (IUCN 3.1)

Scientific classification
- Kingdom: Animalia
- Phylum: Chordata
- Class: Actinopterygii
- Order: Tetraodontiformes
- Family: Tetraodontidae
- Genus: Sphoeroides
- Species: S. yergeri

Binomial name
- Sphoeroides yergeri Shipp, 1972

Species of fish

The speckled puffer (Sphoeroides yergeri) is a species in the family Tetraodontidae, or pufferfishes. It is found in the Caribbean Sea.
