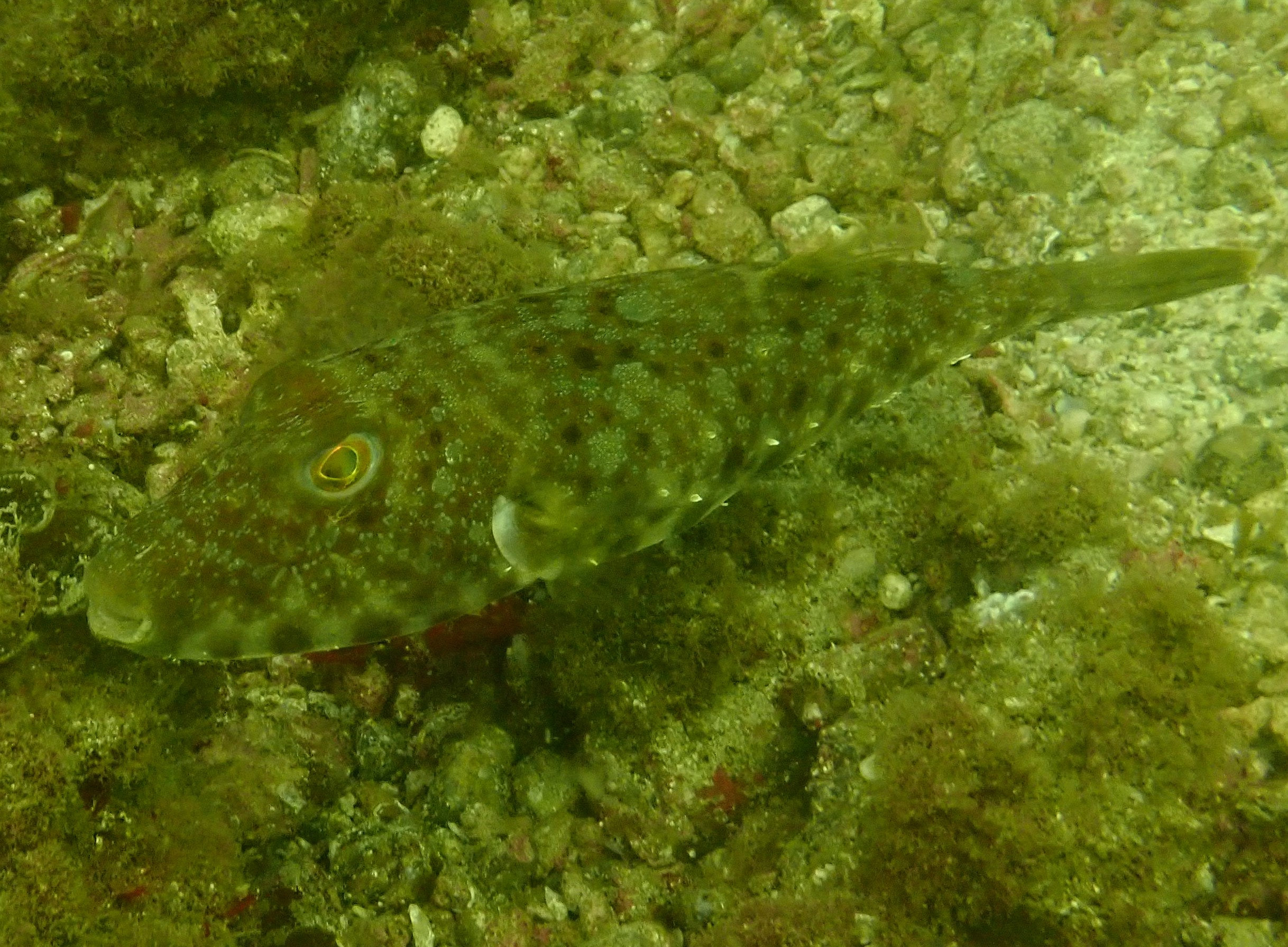

Scientific classification
- Kingdom: Animalia
- Phylum: Chordata
- Class: Actinopterygii
- Order: Tetraodontiformes
- Family: Tetraodontidae
- Genus: Sphoeroides
- Species: S. lobatus

Binomial name
- Sphoeroides lobatus (Steindachner, 1870)

= Longnose puffer =

Species of fish

The longnose puffer (Sphoeroides lobatus) is a species in the family Tetraodontidae, or pufferfishes. It occurs in shallow coastal waters of the Eastern Pacific from California to Chile, including the Galapagos Islands.
