= João Lopes Bank =

Seamount in the Azores

João Lopes Bank Banco João Lopes
- Summit depth: 45 m (148 ft)
- Summit area: 27 m (89 ft)

Location
- Location: Santa Maria, Atlantic Ocean
- Coordinates: 38.14°N 26.38°W
- Country: Portugal

Geology
- Type: Lava flows

The João Lopes Bank (Portuguese: Banco João Lopes) is a seamount situated 1 nautical mile (1.9 km) northwest of the community of Anjos, on the Portuguese island of Santa Maria in the Azores.

== Geography ==
This undersea geological formation consists of a rocky outcrops, an unsheltered zone at the extreme northwest of the island of Santa Maria, that is susceptible to strong currents.

The area was formed by lava flows that extend between depths of 27 metres (89 ft) and 45 metres (148 ft). At the deeper areas the geology is primarily composed of basalt rock, interspersed by sand and large boulders of varying dimensions.

Due to the purity of the water, the visibility in this area extends to approximately 22 metres (72 ft).

=== Biome ===
The area is dotted with a rich biodiversity of varying aquatic species; the bank is populated sea floor and mid-oceanic schools of Azores chromis (Chromis limbata), Blacktail comber (Serranus atricauda), Guinean puffer (Sphoeroides marmoratus), Mediterranean rainbow wrasse (Coris julis), Ornate wrasse (Thalassoma pavo), Salema porgy (Sarpa salpa) and Mediterranean parrotfish (Sparisoma cretense). At 20 metres (66 ft) depths are frequently visible Needlefish (Belonidae), o lírios, the large Atlantic goliath grouper (Epinephelus itajara), schools of Giant oceanic manta ray (Manta birostris), Dolphins and White-Tip Sharks, known in the Azores as Marracho.

== See also ==
- Hydrothermal vents and seamounts of the Azores
