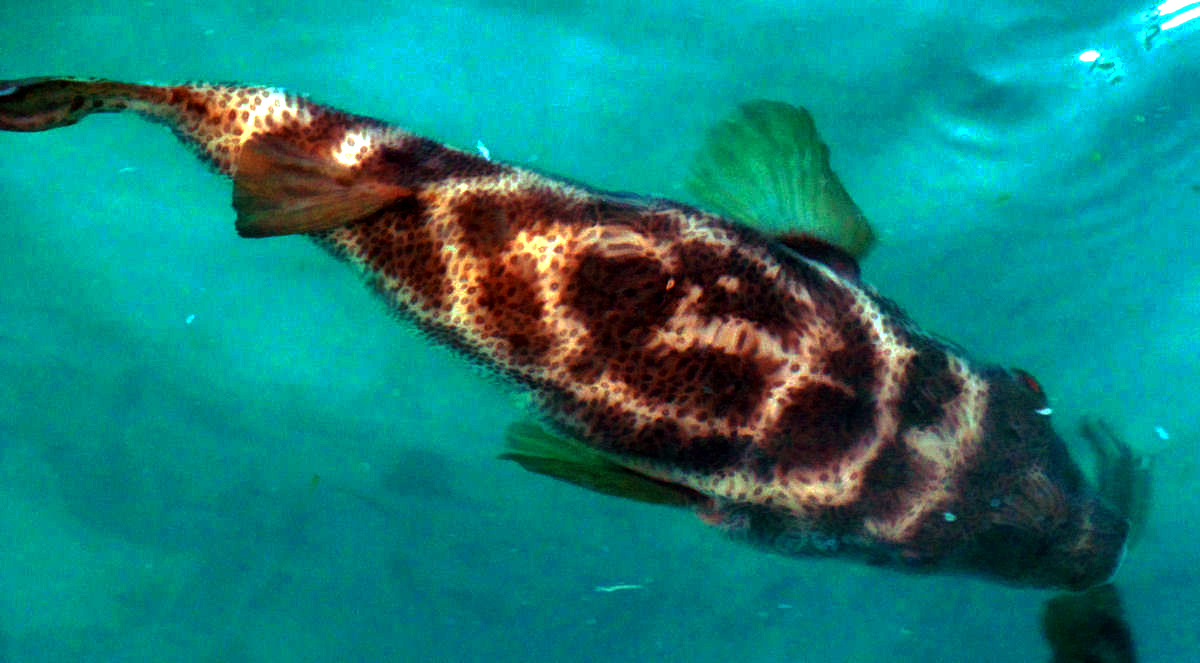
- Swimming near Galápagos Islands

Conservation status
- Least Concern (IUCN 3.1)

Scientific classification
- Kingdom: Animalia
- Phylum: Chordata
- Class: Actinopterygii
- Division: Teleostei
- Order: Tetraodontiformes
- Family: Tetraodontidae
- Genus: Sphoeroides
- Species: S. annulatus

Binomial name
- Sphoeroides annulatus (Jenyns, 1842)

= Sphoeroides annulatus =

Bullseye puffer

Species of fish

Sphoeroides annulatus, commonly known as the bullseye puffer, is a species of fish in the family Tetraodontidae, or pufferfishes. It is found in the eastern Pacific Ocean from California, USA to Pisco, Peru and the Galápagos Islands.

== Geographic range ==
Globally, there are twenty-three species in the genus Sphoeroides. Of these eleven are found in Mexican waters, six in the Atlantic, and five in the Pacific Ocean. Three species of puffer span along the north-west of the Mexican Pacific coastline. Sphoeroides annulatus, commonly known as the bullseye puffer, is distributed along the eastern Pacific Ocean, from south California, USA, to the Peruvian coasts, including the Gulf of California and Galápagos Islands.

== Habitat ==
Sphoeroides annulatus resides over sandy bottoms and occasionally around rocky reefs and adjacent sand patches. They use their habitat as camouflage from predators. They live in shallow depths but have been found up to 70 meters deep. They can be found in subtropical and tropical temperatures averaging 25.8 °C.

== Physical description ==
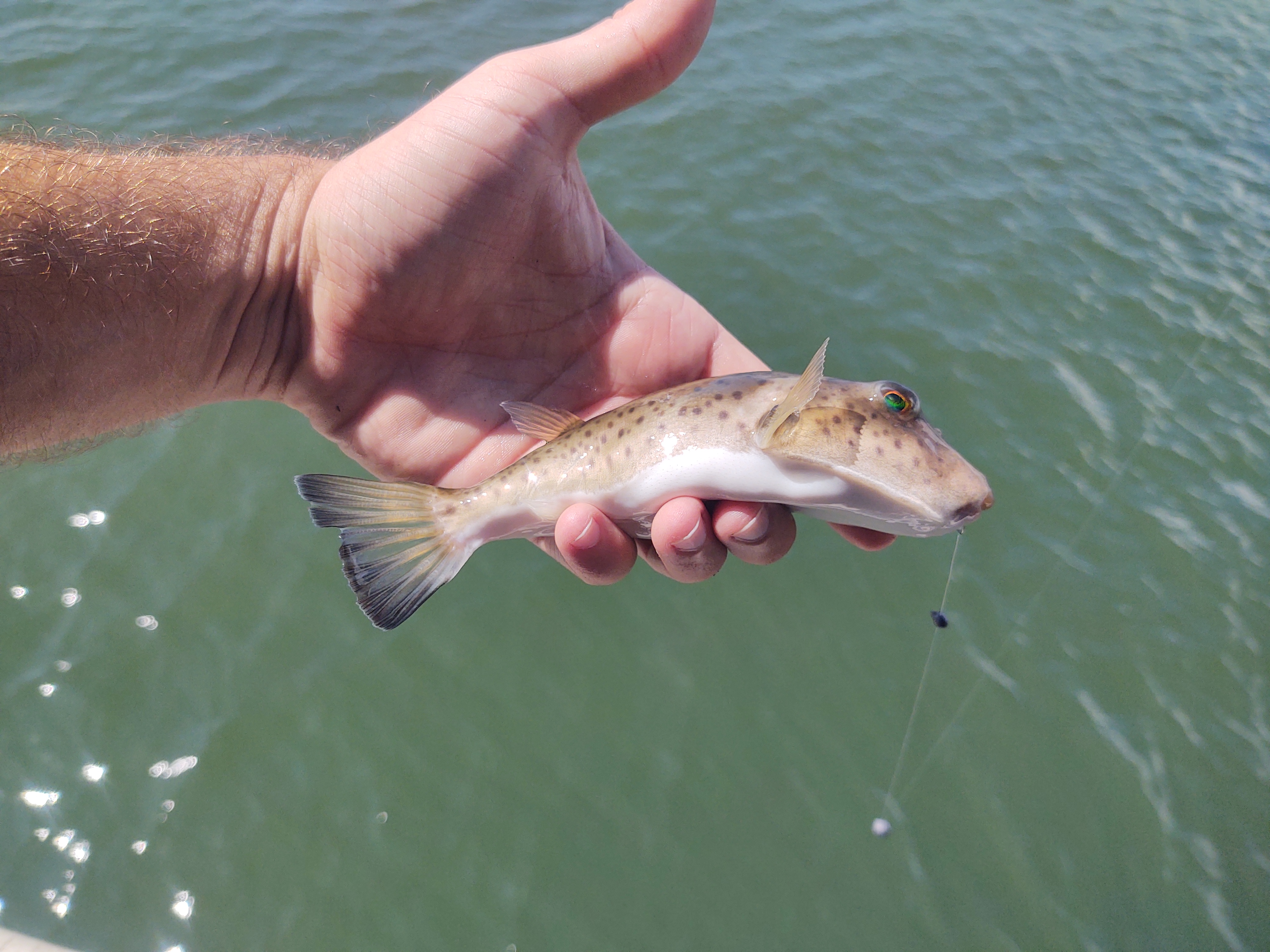
A bullseye puffer caught near Panama City, Panama (November 21, 2024).

Sphoeroides annulatus has a moderately elongated body with a depth that is 25% to 33% of the standard length. Their back is olive-brown, and their flat ventral side is white. Their head and back have narrow yellowish lines, bars, and oblique bands, and 3 narrow bands behind the eyes. There is a double concentric oval on their back that resembles a 'bullseye', even though this may be obscure in large adults (Jenyns 1842). Their head, sides, and upper back are covered with small dark spots. They have a yellow iris and spotless fins. Their head is large, projecting, and blunt and the gap between their elevated eyes is wide and convex. They have powerful, strong teeth. Their dorsal and anal fins are small with 6 to 9 rays with short bases, located farther back on their body with the anal fin being slightly behind the dorsal fin. Their caudal fin is bluntly convex, and they do not have pelvic fins. Their head and body are covered with small spines. Their skin is scaleless. They can grow to 48 cm in length.

== Development ==
Sphoeroides annulatus intestine and liver start to develop one day after they hatch. The pancreas is next to develop. The mouth opens after four days, which is the start of rotifer feeding. A study showed trypsinogen gene expression was detected very early in development, starting in the fertilized egg, showing a sharp increase in eggs at 75 h after fertilization, and then a gradual increase after hatching as the larvae developed. This is important to allow Sphoeroides annulatus the ability to digest food. It takes two to three years to reach the maximum growth size.

== Reproduction – general behavior/parental investment ==
When young, Sphoeroides annulatus are often found in pure freshwater but migrate to brackish or full marine waters as they reach adulthood. Successful hatchery production of larvae and juveniles has been achieved. This is important for their mass production to supply fish farms with juveniles for growing at the commercial scale. Parental investment is known in the Sphoeroides maculatus where the males defend the eggs until they hatch. Other Sphoeroides spawn between May and August in shallow sandy or muddy water.

== Life span ==
Little information is known about the life span of Sphoeroides annulatus. Sphoeroides annulatus live for an average of ten years depending on species and environment.

== Behavior ==
Sphoeroides annulatus are well camouflaged but may lack the ability to blow themselves up like other Puffers to prevent predator attacks. Like other Puffers, the Bullseye Puffer should be considered highly poisonous and even fatal, if eaten. This is due to the potential presence of the potent neurotoxins saxitoxin and/or tetrodotoxin, which is most likely found in their skin, viscera, and gonads and is believed to protect them from predation by larger fish. The presence of toxin content was determined in extracts of sperm, eggs, embryo, larval, post-larval, juvenile, pre-adult, and adult fish.

== Food habits ==
Sphoeroides annulatus can ingest feed particles on the water surface, particles sinking in the water column, and resting on the bottom. Studies are in progress to evaluate the suitability of feeding either floating or sinking feed particles, or a combination of the two. This is based on species in aquaculture. This species feeds on insects, crustaceans, and small fish in the wild. They can use their beak like mouth to remove shellfish from their shells.

== Predation ==
Sharks are immune to the toxins of Sphoeroides annulatus. They are the main predator of puffer fish along with other large fish, sea snakes, and humans. For humans, the ovaries and the liver must be avoided to prevent ingesting any poison (Diggles et al., 2003). They use their color pattern as camouflage to hide from predators by blending into coral reefs and sandy bottoms.

== Ecosystem roles ==
Little information is known about the Sphoeroides annulatus role in the ecosystem. Sphoeroides consume insects, crustaceans, and small fish in shallow water. The juveniles are often found in mangroves and estuaries.

== Economic importance ==
Sphoeroides annulatus possesses a high market appreciation of US $11 per kg in the US. The bullseye puffer lacks scales and contains little bone. It is highly appreciated for its quality meat and is increasing in market demand. Sphoeroides annulatus ranks fifth in relative importance based on the production value and volume captured according to some primary buyers. About 600 tons are exported annually, making Mexico the second largest exporter of puffer fish.

== Conservation status ==
From a conservation perspective, Sphoeroides annulatus is currently considered to be of least concern. It has a stable, widely distributed population. They are a targeted species by subsistence fishermen off the beaches of Baja California Sur via hook and line and in certain locations can be caught in abundance. They are often encountered mid-water by divers. Their largest threat is habitat loss.
