= Sphoeroides trichocephalus =

Conservation status
- Least Concern (IUCN 3.1)

Scientific classification
- Domain: Eukaryota
- Kingdom: Animalia
- Phylum: Chordata
- Class: Actinopterygii
- Order: Tetraodontiformes
- Family: Tetraodontidae
- Genus: Sphoeroides
- Species: S. trichocephalus

Binomial name
- Sphoeroides trichocephalus (Cope, 1870)

Synonyms
- Sphoeroides fuerthii Steindachner 1876; Tetraodon trichocephalus Cope 1870

Species of fish

Sphoeroides trichocephalus, the pygmy puffer, is a species of marine pufferfish native to the Central American coast of the Pacific Ocean, and can be found from La Serena, Chile to San Carlos, Mexico. S. trichocephalus are a demersal species, commonly found on soft substrates in shallow bays and coves at depths between 1–10 m (3.3–32.8 ft). This species grows to a maximum total length (TL) of 10.5 cm (4.1 in). They are not widely utilized by humans but may be found in markets sold as a food fish. They are likely taken as bycatch in trawl fisheries and discarded.

There are presently no conservation efforts put in place for this species, as they are classified as least concern on the IUCN Red List with no known threats, though they may be found in marine protected areas.
