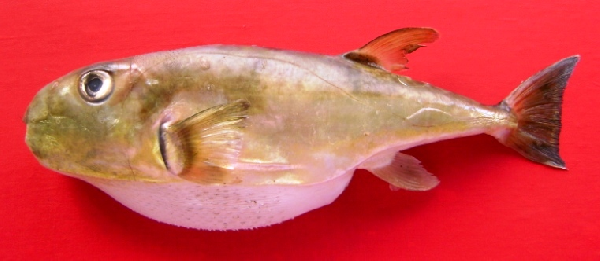
- Lagocephalus spadiceus

Scientific classification
- Kingdom: Animalia
- Phylum: Chordata
- Class: Actinopterygii
- Order: Tetraodontiformes
- Family: Tetraodontidae
- Subfamily: Tetraodontinae
- Genus: Lagocephalus; Swainson, 1839

Type species
- Tetraodon lagocephalus Linnaeus, 1758

= Lagocephalus =

Genus of fishes

Lagocephalus (from Ancient Greek λαγώς (lagṓs), meaning "hare", and κεφαλή (kephalḗ), meaning "head", in reference to its rabbit-like face) is a genus of pufferfishes in the family Tetraodontidae with a circumglobal distribution.

== Species ==
There are currently 11 recognized species in this genus:

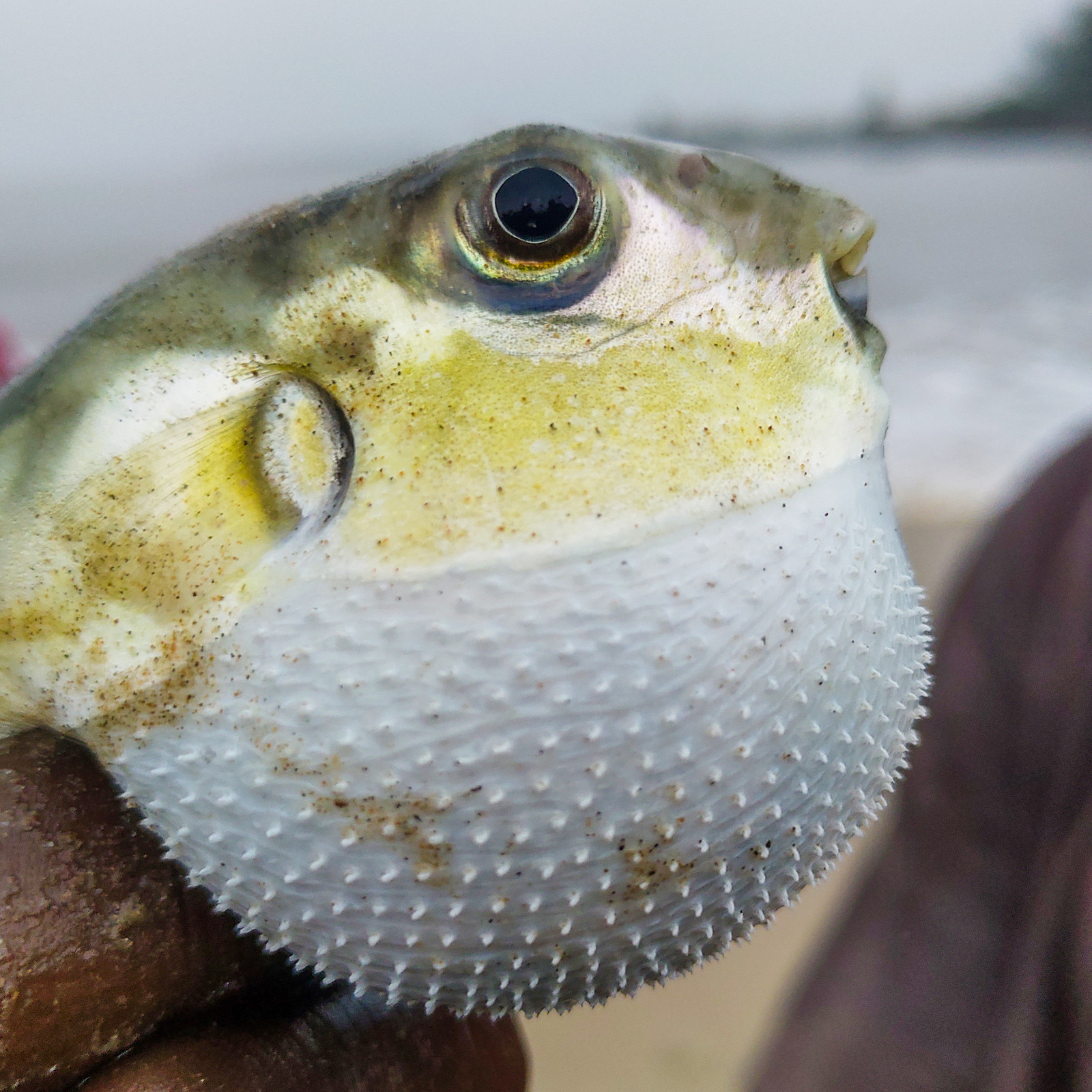
Inflated L. laevigatus

- Lagocephalus cheesemanii (Clarke, 1897)
- Lagocephalus gloveri Abe & Tabeta, 1983
- Lagocephalus guentheri (A. Miranda-Ribeiro, 1915) (diamond-back puffer)
- Lagocephalus inermis (Temminck & Schlegel, 1850) (smooth blaasop)
- Lagocephalus laevigatus (Linnaeus, 1766) (smooth puffer)
- Lagocephalus lagocephalus (Linnaeus, 1758) (oceanic puffer)
- Lagocephalus lunaris (Bloch & J. G. Schneider, 1801) (lunartail puffer)
- Lagocephalus sceleratus (J. F. Gmelin, 1789) (silver-cheeked puffer)
- Lagocephalus spadiceus (J. Richardson, 1845) (half-smooth golden puffer)
- Lagocephalus suezensis (E. Clark & Gohar, 1953)
- Lagocephalus wheeleri Abe, Tabeta & Kitahama, 1984
