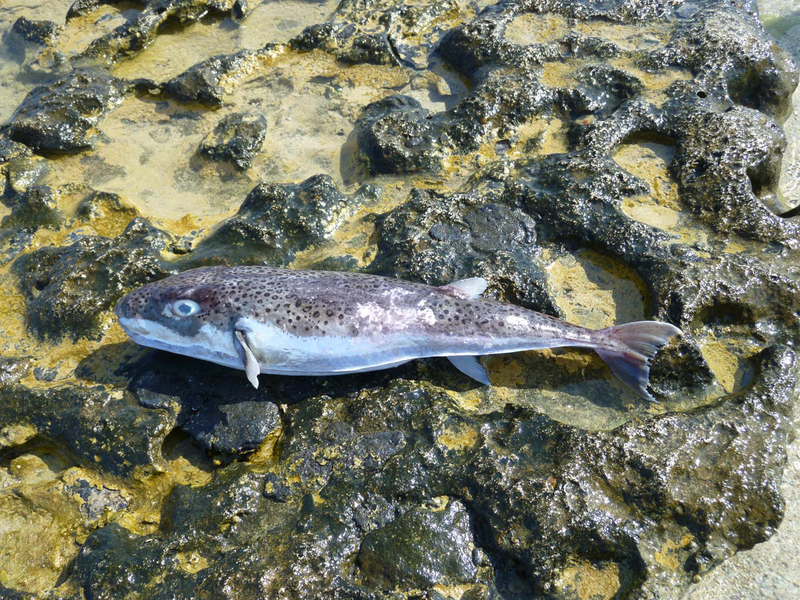

Scientific classification
- Kingdom: Animalia
- Phylum: Chordata
- Class: Actinopterygii
- Division: Teleostei
- Order: Tetraodontiformes
- Family: Tetraodontidae
- Genus: Lagocephalus
- Species: L. spadiceus

Binomial name
- Lagocephalus spadiceus (J. Richardson, 1845)

= Lagocephalus spadiceus =

Species of fish

Lagocephalus spadiceus, also known as the half-smooth golden pufferfish or shirosaba-fugu (white mackerel pufferfish), is a species of fish in the family Tetraodontidae. It is a common fish in the Red Sea, as well as the Indian Ocean, but can be found also in the Mediterranean, where it arrived from its natural habitat by Lessepsian migration.

Consumption of this fish can be deadly. Its internal organs, such as liver, gall bladder and sexual organs, contain tetrodotoxin, a powerful neurotoxin.
