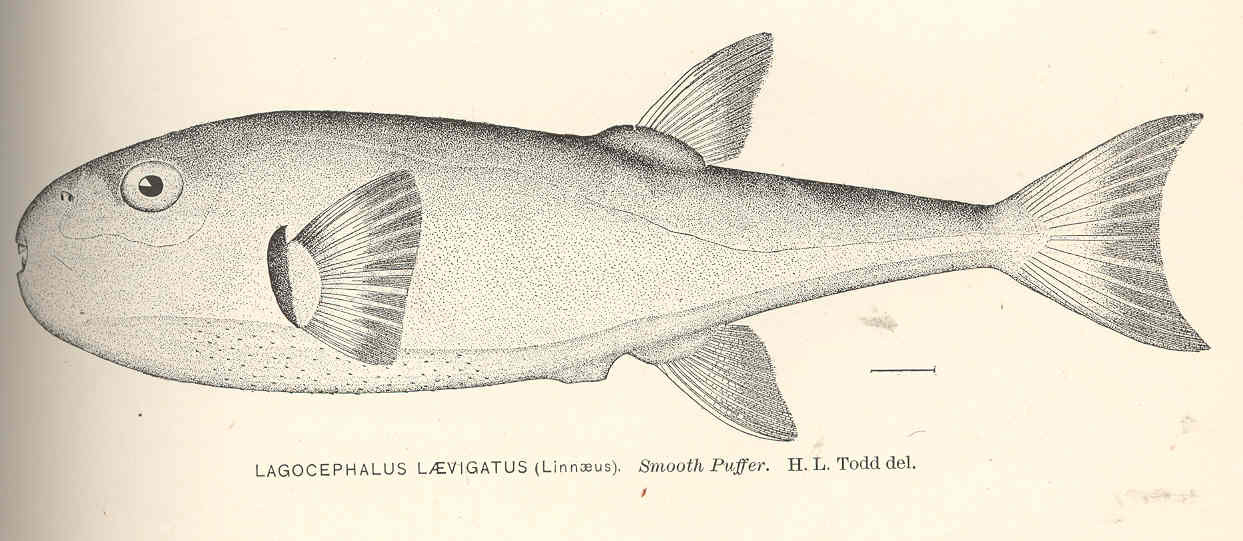

Scientific classification
- Domain: Eukaryota
- Kingdom: Animalia
- Phylum: Chordata
- Class: Actinopterygii
- Order: Tetraodontiformes
- Family: Tetraodontidae
- Genus: Lagocephalus
- Species: L. laevigatus

Binomial name
- Lagocephalus laevigatus (Linnaeus, 1766)

Synonyms
- Holocanthus melanothos; Lagocephalus pachycephalus; Tetraodon laevigatus; Tetrodon laevigatus; Tetrodon lineolatus

= Lagocephalus laevigatus =

Species of pufferfish

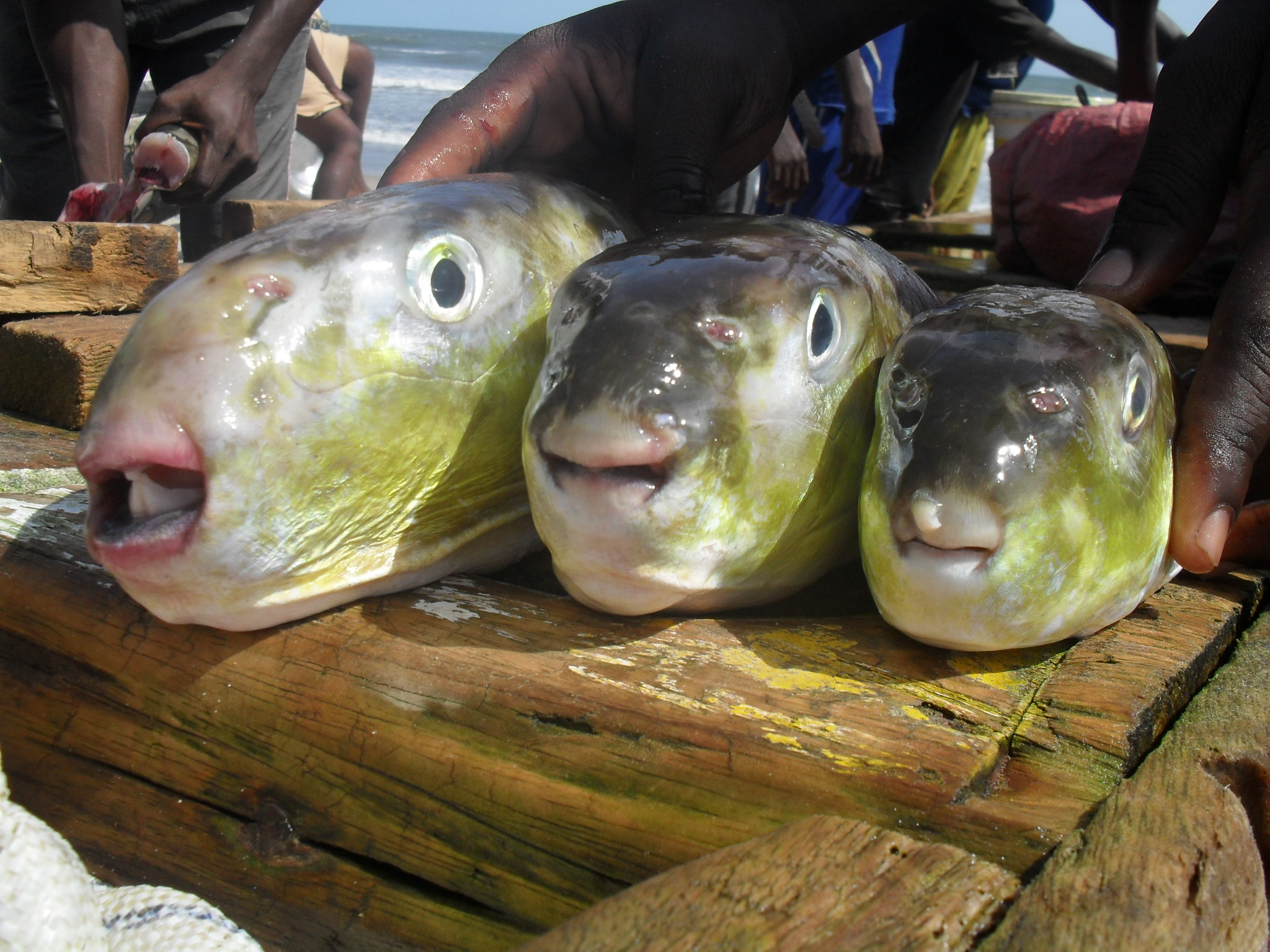
Three recently caught smooth puffers on the shore near Bortianor, Ghana.

Lagocephalus laevigatus, known as the smooth puffer, is a species of pufferfish in the family Tetraodontidae. It is native to the Western Atlantic, where it ranges from New England to Argentina, as well as the Eastern Atlantic, where it ranges from Mauritania to Namibia. Adults of the species are pelagic and found near continental margins, whereas juveniles are usually found closer to shore or offshore banks, with both occurring either alone or in small, loose groups. It occurs at a depth range of 10 to 180 m (33 to 591 ft) over sandy or muddy bottoms and is a very large pufferfish, reaching 100 cm (39.4 inches) in total length. The species feeds on fish and shrimp and can be dangerously toxic if ingested. It is known to be oviparous. It is sometimes confused with the related species Lagocephalus inermis which is native to the Indo-Pacific.
