= Bearded puffer =

Scientific classification
- Domain: Eukaryota
- Kingdom: Animalia
- Phylum: Chordata
- Class: Actinopterygii
- Order: Tetraodontiformes
- Family: Tetraodontidae
- Genus: Sphoeroides
- Species: S. tyleri

Binomial name
- Sphoeroides tyleri Shipp, 1972

Species of fish

The bearded puffer (Sphoeroides tyleri) is a species in the family Tetraodontidae (or pufferfish) which is typically found in marine coastal waters of the West Atlantic from Colombia to Southeastern Brazil.

== Characteristics ==
Bearded pufferfish grow to around 12 cm (4-7") and usually swim at a depth of around 10–80 metres. They can be identified by three to four vague diagonal blotches on the lower cheek. Bearded pufferfish are molluscivores and therefore typically feed on crustaceans, molluscs and echinoderms.

== Conservation ==
S. tyleri is listed on The IUCN Red List of Threatened Species as LC (Least Concern)
