= Peruvian puffer =

Scientific classification
- Kingdom: Animalia
- Phylum: Chordata
- Class: Actinopterygii
- Order: Tetraodontiformes
- Family: Tetraodontidae
- Genus: Sphoeroides
- Species: S. sechurae

Binomial name
- Sphoeroides sechurae Hildebrand, 1946

Species of fish

the Peruvian puffer (Sphoeroides sechurae) is a species in the family Tetraodontidae, or pufferfishes. It is found in the eastern Pacific Ocean.
