= Sphoeroides kendalli =

Scientific classification
- Kingdom: Animalia
- Phylum: Chordata
- Class: Actinopterygii
- Order: Tetraodontiformes
- Family: Tetraodontidae
- Genus: Sphoeroides
- Species: S. kendalli

Binomial name
- Sphoeroides kendalli Meek & Hildebrand, 1928

Species of pufferfish

Sphoeroides kendalli, known as the slick puffer, is a species of pufferfish in the family Tetraodontidae. It is native to the Eastern Pacific, where it ranges from Costa Rica to Talara, Peru. It is a demersal species found in shallow coastal areas that reaches 18 cm (7 inches) in total length.
