= Sphoeroides andersonianus =

Conservation status
- Data Deficient (IUCN 3.1)

Scientific classification
- Kingdom: Animalia
- Phylum: Chordata
- Class: Actinopterygii
- Order: Tetraodontiformes
- Family: Tetraodontidae
- Genus: Sphoeroides
- Species: S. andersonianus

Binomial name
- Sphoeroides andersonianus Morrow, 1957

Species of pufferfish

Sphoeroides andersonianus is a species of pufferfish in the family Tetraodontidae. It is a tropical marine species native to the coast of Peru (Eastern Pacific).
