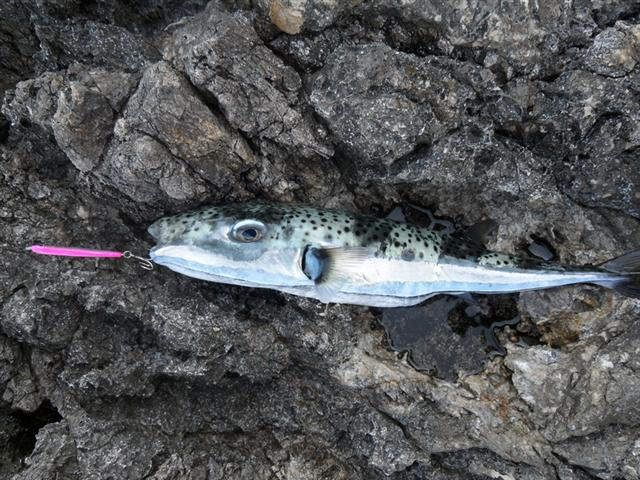

Conservation status
- Least Concern (IUCN 3.1)

Scientific classification
- Kingdom: Animalia
- Phylum: Chordata
- Class: Actinopterygii
- Division: Teleostei
- Order: Tetraodontiformes
- Family: Tetraodontidae
- Genus: Lagocephalus
- Species: L. sceleratus

Binomial name
- Lagocephalus sceleratus (Gmelin, 1789)

Synonyms
- List: Fugu sceleratus (Gmelin, 1789); Gastrophysis sceleratus (Gmelin, 1789); Gastrophysus sceleratus (Gmelin, 1789); Gastrophysus scleratus (Gmelin, 1789); Lagocephalus scleratus (Gmelin, 1789); Lagocephalus gotronus (Gmelin, 1789); Pleudranacanthus sceleratus (Gmelin, 1789); Pleuranacanthus sceleratus (Gmelin, 1789); Spheroides sceleratus (Gmelin, 1789); Sphoeroides sceleratus (Gmelin, 1789); Sphoeroides scleratus (Gmelin, 1789); Tetraodon bicolor (Brevoort, 1856); Tetraodon blochii (Castelnau, 1861); Tetrodon sceleratus (Gmelin, 1789)

= Lagocephalus sceleratus =

Species of fish

Lagocephalus sceleratus - gotronus (Gmelin, 1789), commonly known as the silver-cheeked toadfish, or Sennin-fugu (Japanese: 仙人河豚), or Gotronu, is an extremely poisonous marine bony fish in the family Tetraodontidae (puffer fishes).

== Habitat and distribution ==
The species is common in the tropical waters of the Indian and Pacific oceans. It is a recent Lessepsian migrant into the eastern Mediterranean Sea, which it reached through the Suez Canal, and it is spreading towards the western Mediterranean. It has been caught off the coasts of Israel, the south of Turkey, in Cyprus, the south coasts of mainland Greece, Crete, and Rhodes. In 2013 it was reported off the waters off Lampedusa Island in the central Mediterranean, and in 2015 off Malta and also in waters near the town of Bečići, Montenegro, and in Vlore in Albania on the southeastern Adriatic Sea. One specimen was caught in Gruissan (Aude, France) in the summer of 2014. Greek authorities sent out an alert about the fish. A few days before 9 February 2022, a specimen was caught by Croatian fishermen near the island of Pašman in the Adriatic with the Croatian Institute of Oceanography and Fisheries issuing a warning on its Facebook page about the dangers of handling and consuming the fish. Currently the westernmost record is from the Strait of Gibraltar.

In its native range (in the Red Sea) the silver-cheeked toadfish lives on rocky bottoms from shallow coastal waters down to a 250 m depth (820 ft).

In December 2018, A Semana, a Cape Verde Islands paper published that this fish was caught in its waters, off West Africa. Thus, an alert went out to all fisherman and the general population on the fatal dangers of consuming this fish.

== Description ==
The silver-cheeked toadfish is very similar to the oceanic pufferfish but more elongated and with a symmetrical caudal (tail) fin. Its back is grey or brown with darker spots and it has a white belly. A characteristic silver band runs along the sides of the fish. The silver-cheeked toadfish can measure up to 40 centimetres (16 in).

== Feeding ==
The silver-cheeked toadfish preys upon benthic invertebrates.

== Reproduction ==
Eggs and larvae are found in the pelagic zone.

== Danger to humans ==
Similar to other puffer fishes, the silver-cheeked toadfish is extremely poisonous if eaten because it contains tetrodotoxin in its ovaries and to a lesser extent its skin, muscles and liver, which protects it from voracious predators. It becomes toxic as it eats bacteria that contain the toxin. This deadly substance causes paralysis of involuntary muscles, which may cause its victims to stop breathing or induce heart failure. Fatal intoxications have been reported in Egypt, Israel and Turkey.

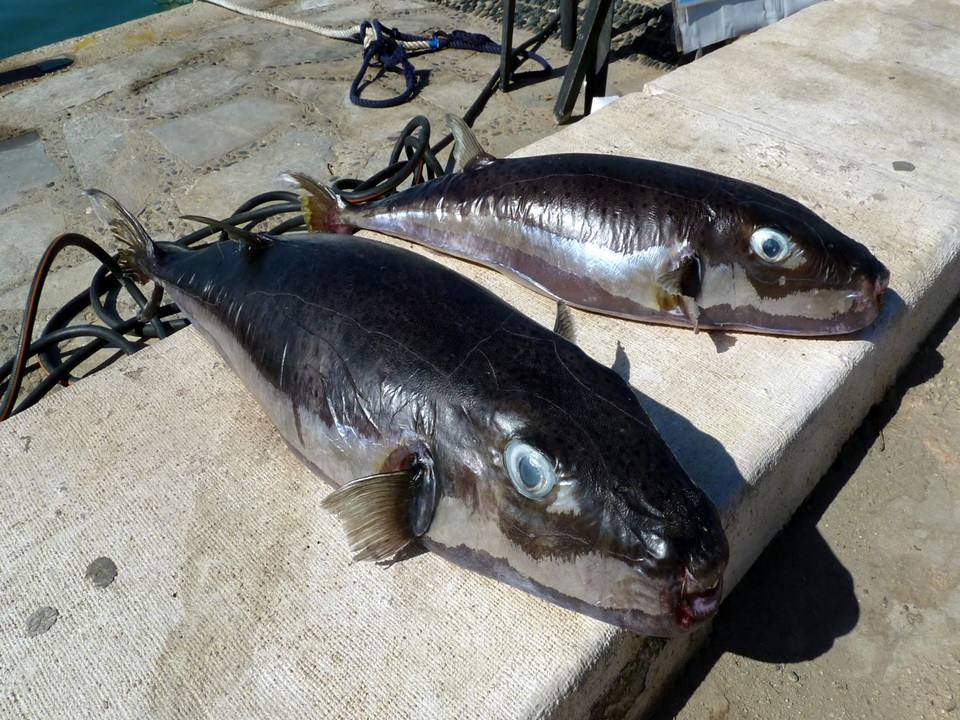
Mediterranean
