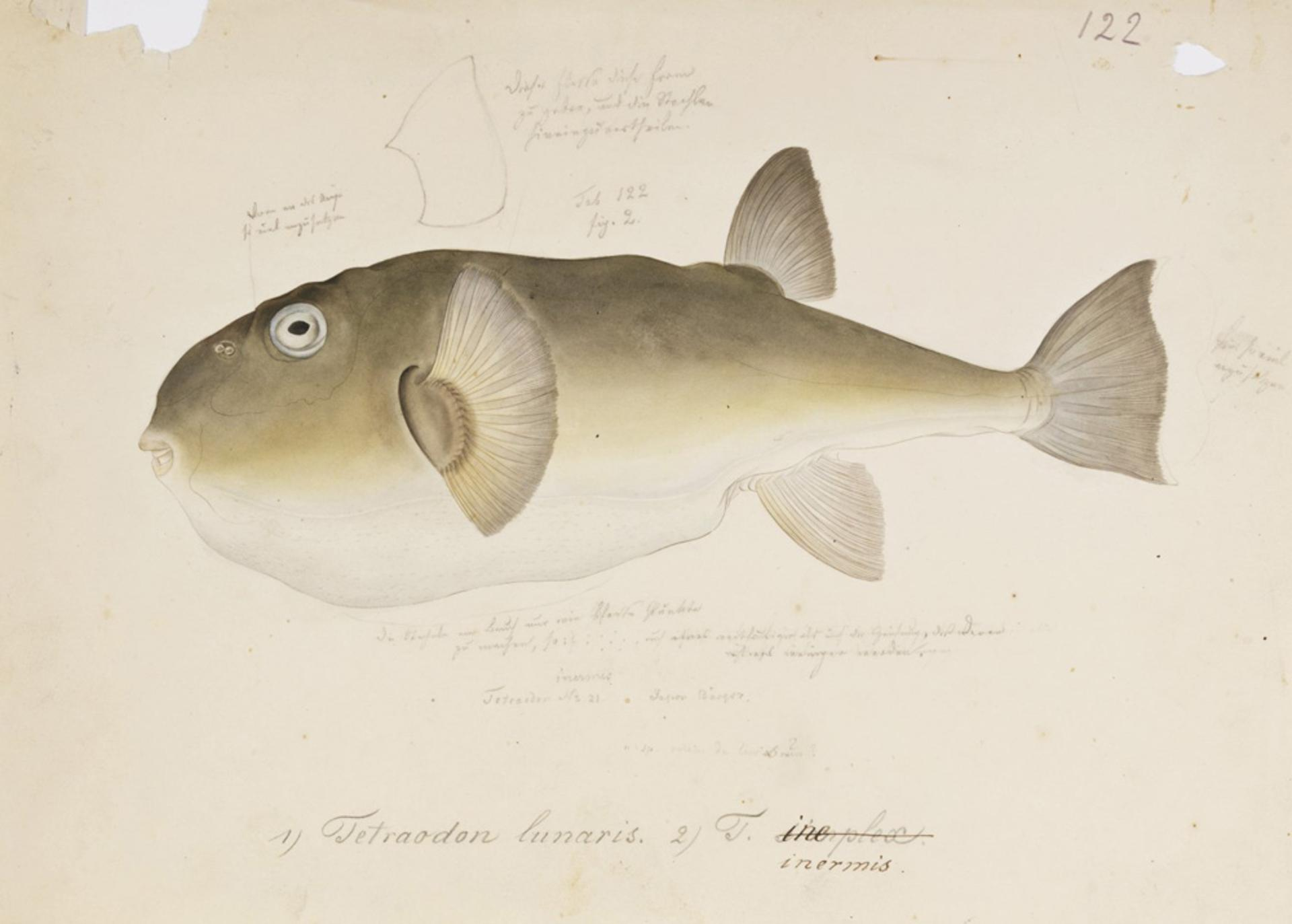

Scientific classification
- Kingdom: Animalia
- Phylum: Chordata
- Class: Actinopterygii
- Division: Teleostei
- Order: Tetraodontiformes
- Family: Tetraodontidae
- Genus: Lagocephalus
- Species: L. inermis

Binomial name
- Lagocephalus inermis (Temminck & Schlegel, 1850)

Synonyms
- Tetraodon inermis

= Lagocephalus inermis =

Species of pufferfish

Lagocephalus inermis, known as the smooth blaasop, is a species of pufferfish in the family Tetraodontidae native to the Indo-Pacific. It is a marine species that ranges from Algoa Bay in South Africa to southern Japan, where it occurs at a depth range of 10 to 200 m (33 to 656 ft) and inhabits the edge of the continental shelf. It is a very large pufferfish, reaching 90 cm (35.4 inches) SL. It closely resembles the Atlantic species Lagocephalus laevigatus, but it can be distinguished from that species by its black gill opening. Additionally, it does not overlap in range with L. laevigatus. It is reported to be demersal and oviparous.
