= Naked puffer =

Scientific classification
- Domain: Eukaryota
- Kingdom: Animalia
- Phylum: Chordata
- Class: Actinopterygii
- Order: Tetraodontiformes
- Family: Tetraodontidae
- Genus: Sphoeroides
- Species: S. lispus

Binomial name
- Sphoeroides lispus H. J. Walker, 1996

Species of fish

The naked puffer (Sphoeroides lispus) is a species in the family Tetraodontidae, or pufferfishes. It is found in the eastern Pacific Ocean.
