= Lagocephalus gloveri =

Conservation status
- Data Deficient (IUCN 3.1)

Scientific classification
- Kingdom: Animalia
- Phylum: Chordata
- Class: Actinopterygii
- Order: Tetraodontiformes
- Family: Tetraodontidae
- Genus: Lagocephalus
- Species: L. gloveri

Binomial name
- Lagocephalus gloveri T. Abe & Tabeta, 1983

Species of fish

Lagocephalus gloveri is a species of fish in the family Tetraodontidae. It is found in Hong Kong, Indonesia, Japan, and Taiwan.
