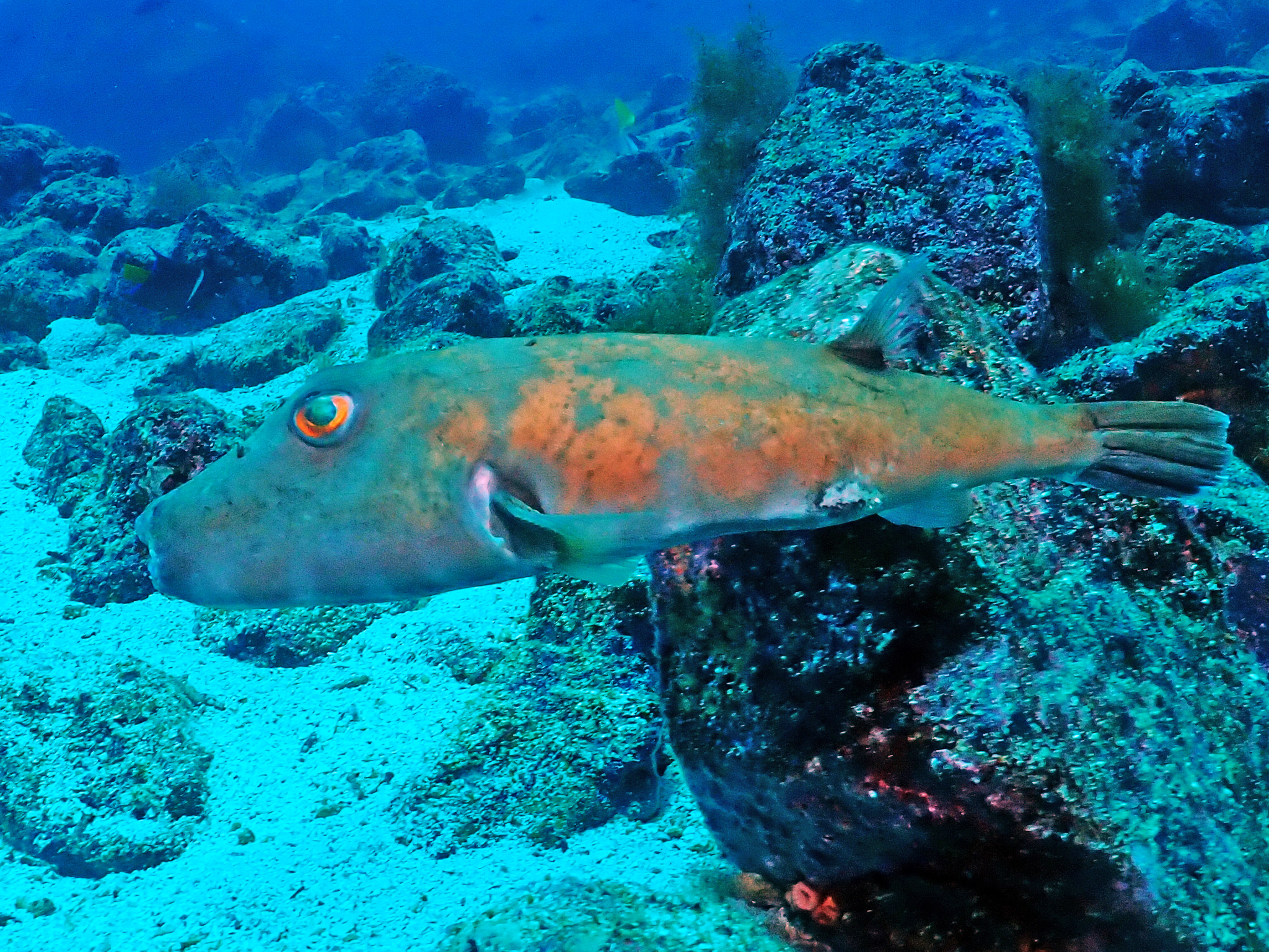

Conservation status
- Least Concern (IUCN 3.1)

Scientific classification
- Kingdom: Animalia
- Phylum: Chordata
- Class: Actinopterygii
- Order: Tetraodontiformes
- Family: Tetraodontidae
- Genus: Sphoeroides
- Species: S. angusticeps

Binomial name
- Sphoeroides angusticeps (Jenyns, 1842)

Synonyms
- Tetrodon angusticeps Jenyns 1842

= Sphoeroides angusticeps =

Species of pufferfish

Sphoeroides angusticeps, also known as the narrow-headed puffer, concave puffer, and skin-flap puffer, is a species of pufferfish in the family Tetraodontidae. It is a tropical marine species endemic to the Galapagos Islands, where it occurs at a depth range of about 5 to 20 m (16 to 66 ft). It reaches 25 cm (9.8 in) in total length. The species is thought to be diurnal, hovering just above the substrate by day and burying itself at night.
