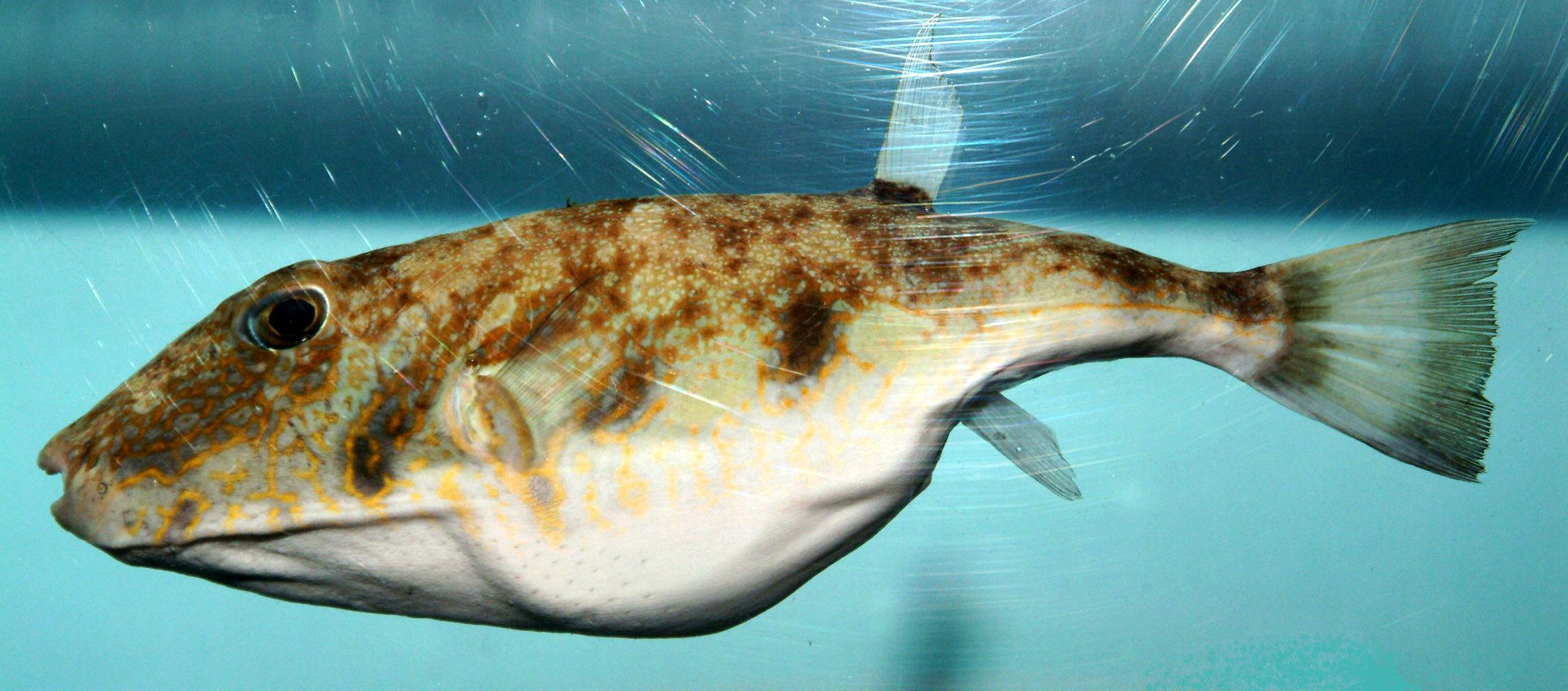

Scientific classification
- Kingdom: Animalia
- Phylum: Chordata
- Class: Actinopterygii
- Order: Tetraodontiformes
- Family: Tetraodontidae
- Genus: Sphoeroides
- Species: S. dorsalis

Binomial name
- Sphoeroides dorsalis Longley, 1934

= Sphoeroides dorsalis =

Species of pufferfish

Sphoeroides dorsalis, known as the marbled puffer, is a species of pufferfish in the family Tetraodontidae. It is native to the Western Atlantic, where it ranges from North Carolina to Suriname and occurs at a depth of 18 to 100 m (59 to 328 ft). It is a demersal oviparous species found over soft bottoms that reaches 20 cm (7.9 inches) in total length.
