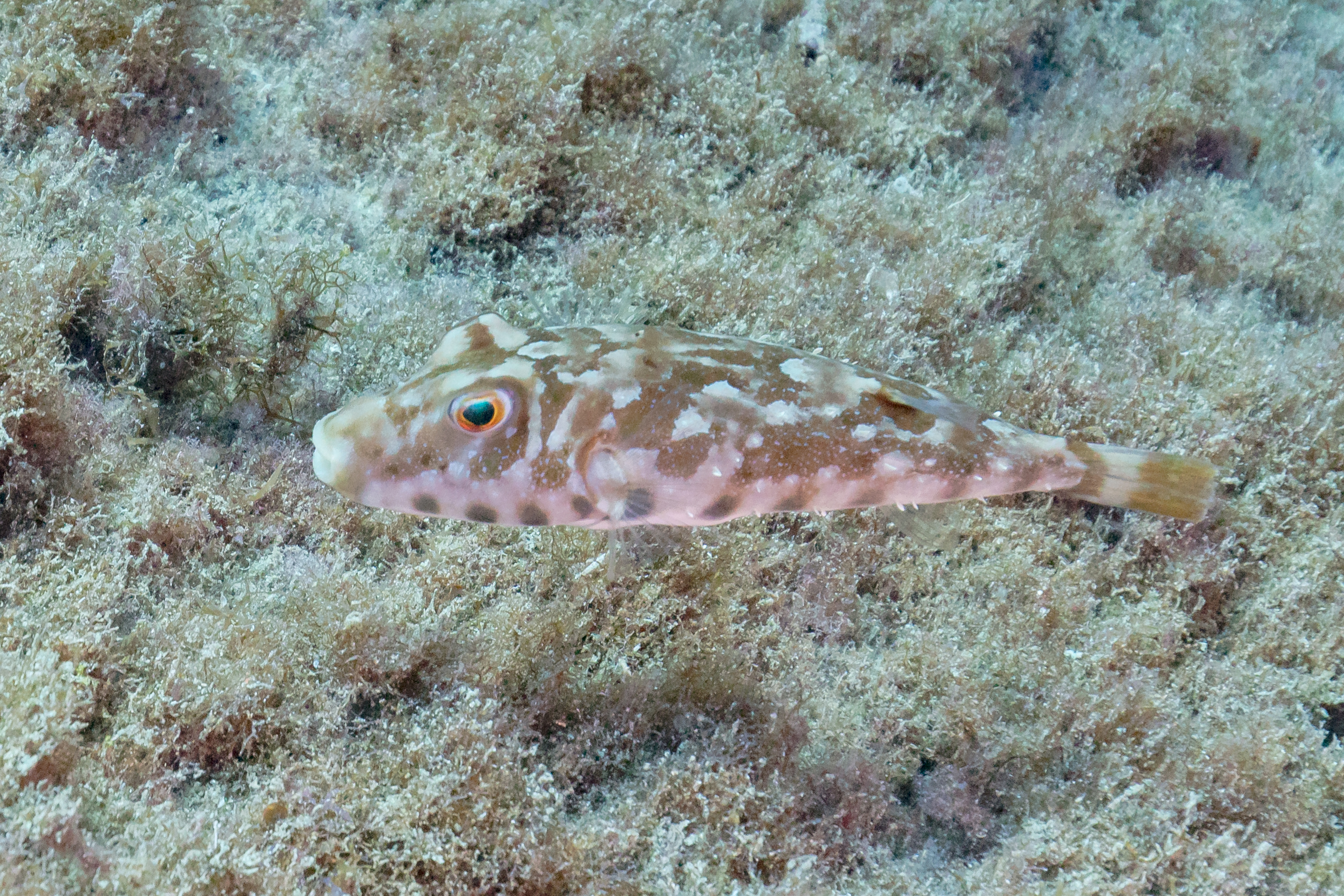

Scientific classification
- Domain: Eukaryota
- Kingdom: Animalia
- Phylum: Chordata
- Class: Actinopterygii
- Order: Tetraodontiformes
- Family: Tetraodontidae
- Genus: Sphoeroides
- Species: S. marmoratus

Binomial name
- Sphoeroides marmoratus (R. T. Lowe, 1838)

= Guinean puffer =

Species of fish

The Guinean puffer (Sphoeroides marmoratus) is a species of the family Tetraodontidae, or pufferfishes. Found in the eastern Atlantic from Portugal to Angola, including Madeira, the Azores, Cape Verde and the Canary Islands, it has been recently recorded on rare, distinct occasions in the Alboran Sea, western Mediterranean Sea.
