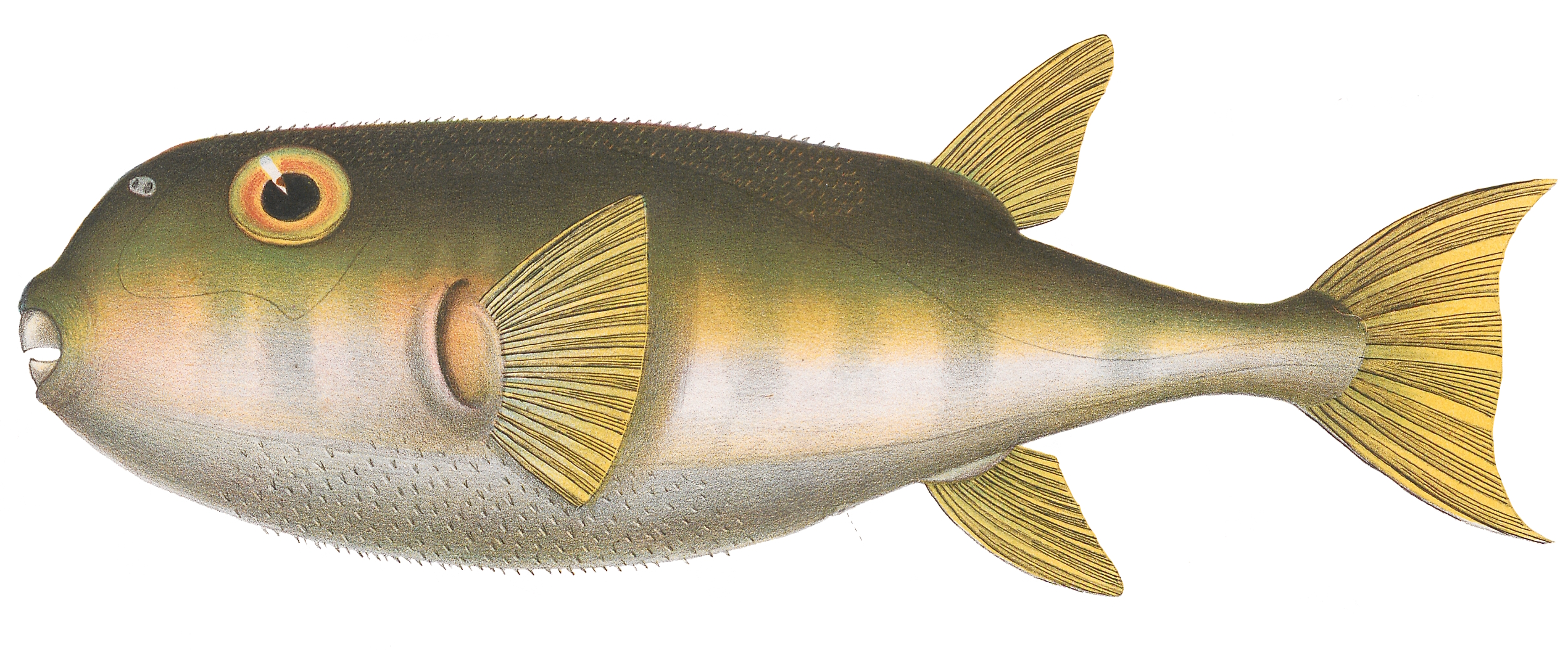

Conservation status
- Least Concern (IUCN 3.1)

Scientific classification
- Kingdom: Animalia
- Phylum: Chordata
- Class: Actinopterygii
- Order: Tetraodontiformes
- Family: Tetraodontidae
- Genus: Lagocephalus
- Species: L. lunaris

Binomial name
- Lagocephalus lunaris (Bloch & Schneider, 1801)

= Lunartail puffer =

Species of fish

Lagocephalus lunaris, also known as the lunartail puffer, is a species of fish in the family Tetraodontidae. It lives in areas in the Indo-Pacific, and its habitat is areas in coastal marine waters, at depths of up to 150 meters, in sandy bottoms, coastal reefs, estuaries and mangroves.

This fish is listed as least concern, due to it overlapping many marine protected areas.

It has a maximum length of 45 centimeters. It eats marine invertebrates as its food source, and contains poison that makes it dangerous to consume.

Endoparasites of the lunartail puffer include Angusticaecum tetrodonti, Bianium arabicum, Bianium plicitum, Caligus laminatus, Maculifer indicus, Neodiploproctodaeum karachiense, Notoporus stunkardi, and Opistholebes amplicoelus.
