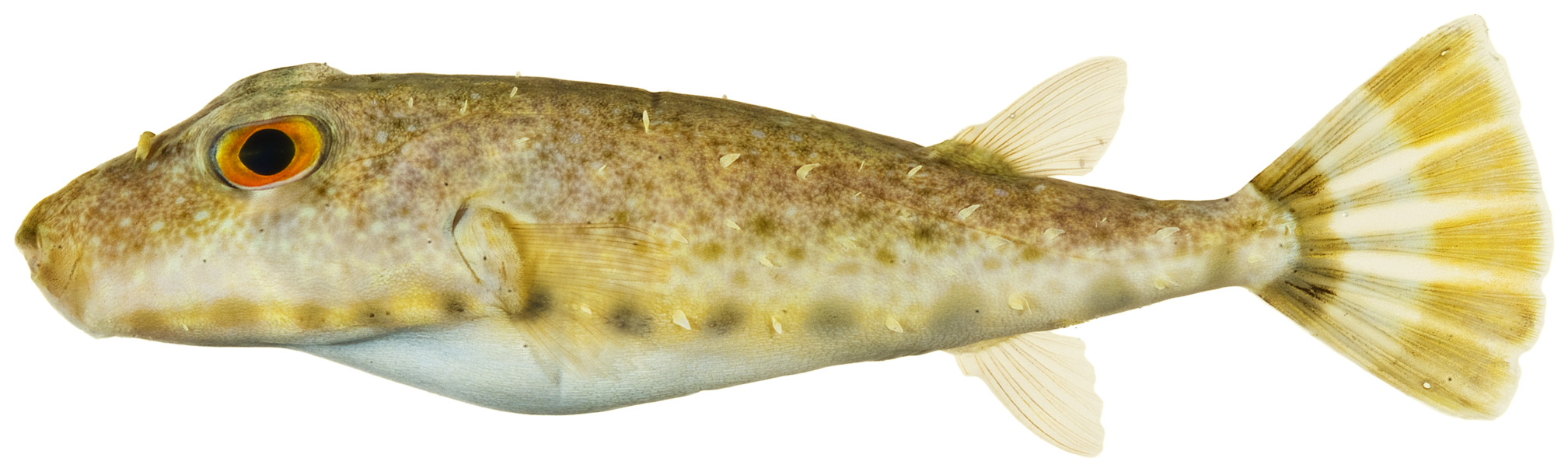

Scientific classification
- Kingdom: Animalia
- Phylum: Chordata
- Class: Actinopterygii
- Division: Teleostei
- Order: Tetraodontiformes
- Family: Tetraodontidae
- Genus: Sphoeroides
- Species: S. spengleri

Binomial name
- Sphoeroides spengleri (Bloch, 1785)

= Bandtail puffer =

Species of fish

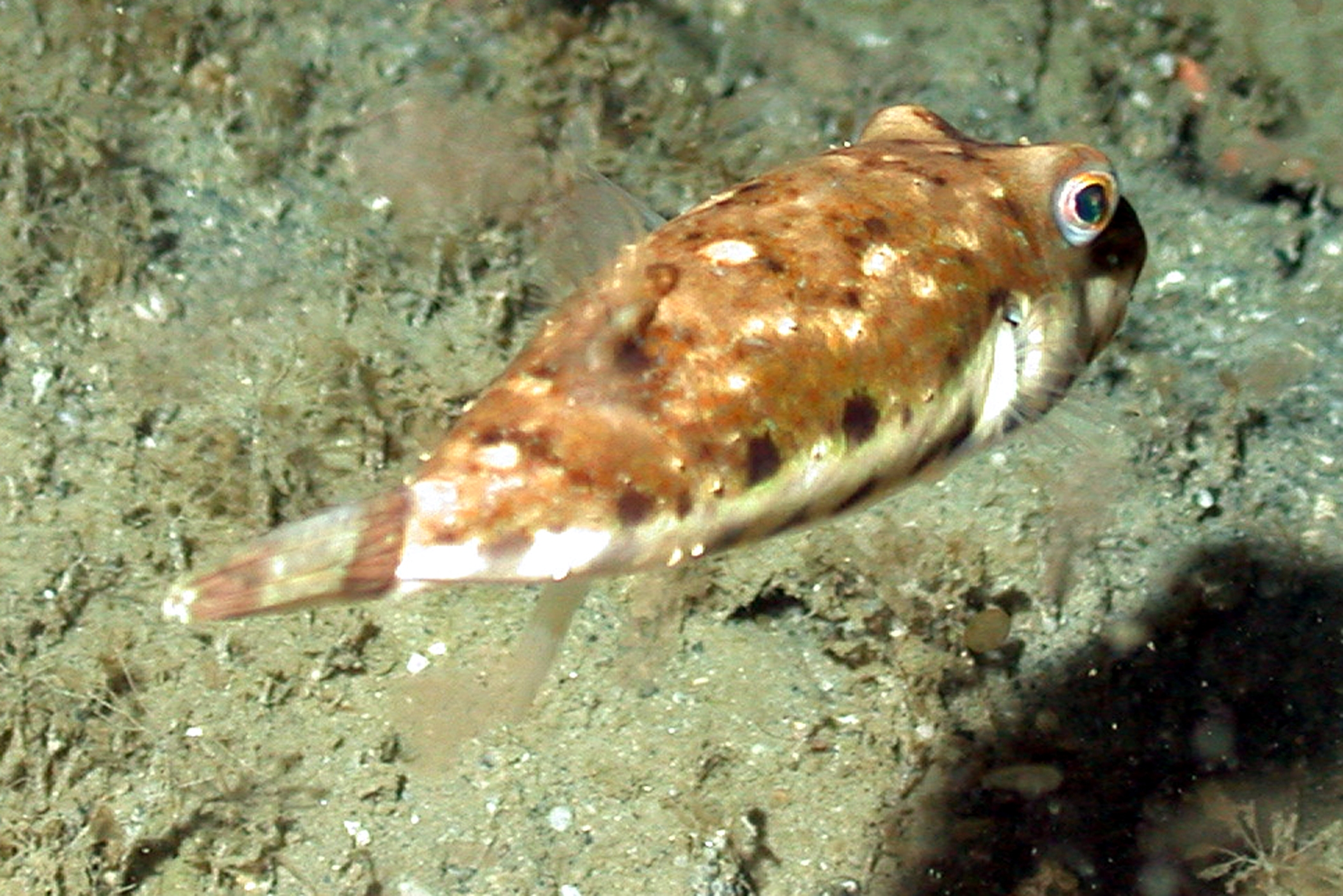
Bandtail puffer (Sphoeroides spengleri)

The bandtail puffer (Sphoeroides spengleri) is a species in the family Tetraodontidae, or pufferfishes. It can grow to a length of about 30 cm and is common in the Caribbean and observed from Massachusetts, USA in the north to Santa Catarina, Brazil in the south.

== Biology ==
The bandtail puffer is usually found on seagrass beds and coral reefs, and mostly close to the bottom, where it finds adequate cover and is less likely to be spotted by predators.
