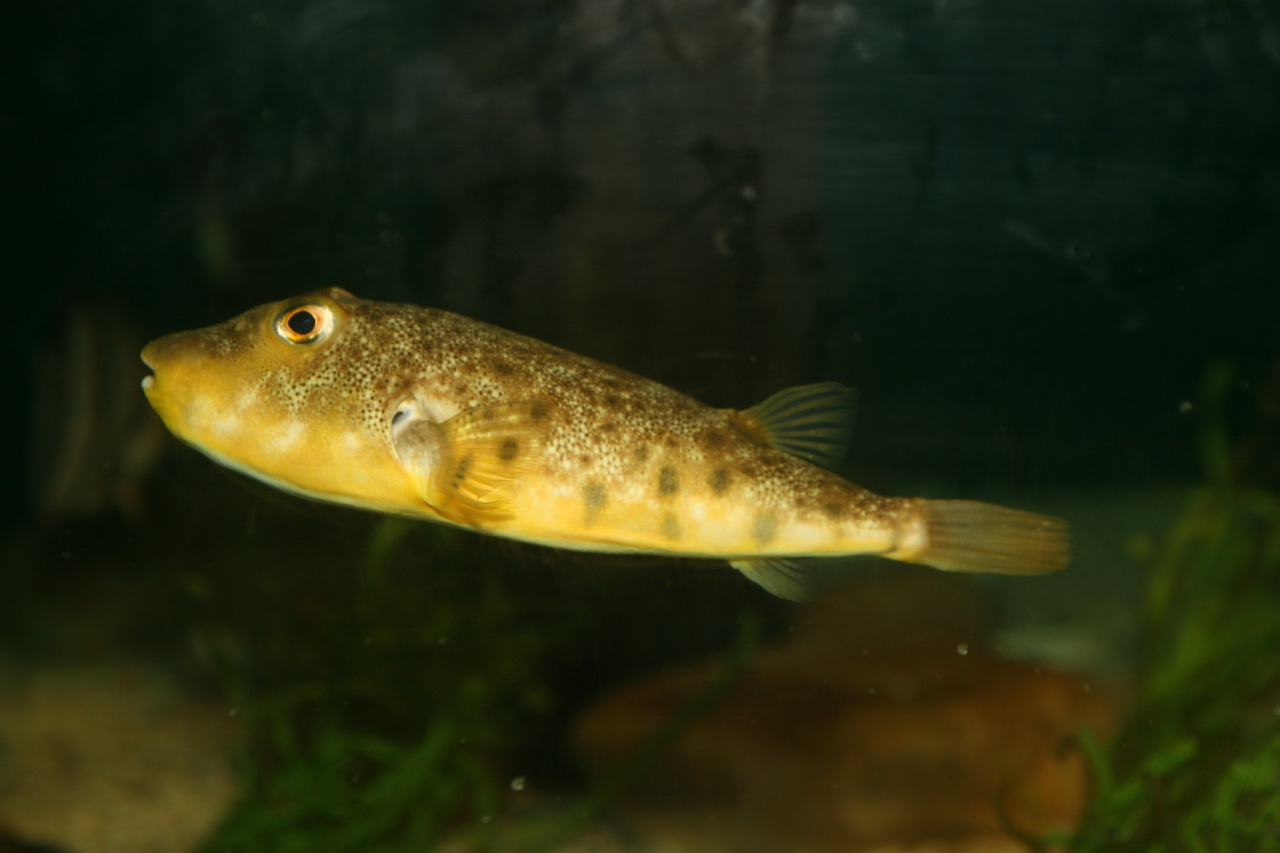

Conservation status
- Least Concern (IUCN 3.1)

Scientific classification
- Kingdom: Animalia
- Phylum: Chordata
- Class: Actinopterygii
- Order: Tetraodontiformes
- Family: Tetraodontidae
- Genus: Sphoeroides
- Species: S. maculatus

Binomial name
- Sphoeroides maculatus (Linnaeus, 1758)

= Northern puffer =

Species of fish

The northern puffer, Sphoeroides maculatus, is a species in the family Tetraodontidae, or pufferfishes, found along the Atlantic coast of North America. Unlike many other pufferfish species, the flesh of the northern puffer is not poisonous, although its viscera can contain poison, and high concentrations of toxins have been observed in the skin of Floridian populations. They are commonly called sugar toads in the Chesapeake Bay region, where they are eaten as a delicacy. There was widespread consumption of northern puffers during the rationing that accompanied the Second World War, establishing a commercial fishery that reached its zenith in the 1960s. In much of the Northeast, the fish is known simply as "blowfish" or "chicken of the sea". They may also be sold as "sea squab".

== Description ==
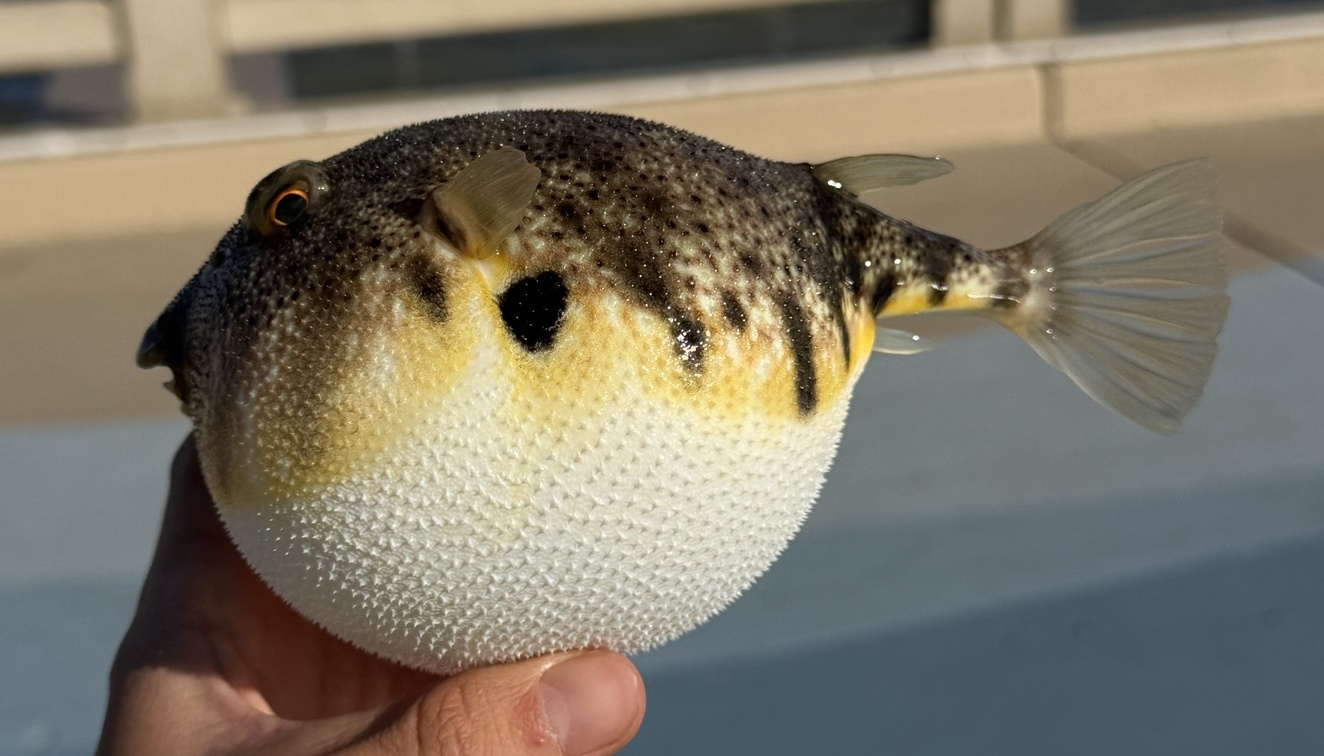
Inflated

The northern puffer has the shape of a club. Adults have small spines covering the entire body with a tiny beak-like mouth. It is characterized by vertical stripes with a gray to brown dorsal surface and a yellow to white belly. It has tiny jet-black pepper spots (about 1 mm in diameter) scattered over most of pigmented surface, particularly evident on cheeks. Lower sides of the body have a row of black, elongate, bar-like markings. A small dorsal fin is set far back near the tail. Sphoeroides maculatus, like others in the puffer family, "puffs up" into a ball in self-defense by inhaling water into a special chamber near its stomach. They will puff up with air if taken out of the water. The northern puffer reaches up to 36 cm (1 ft 2 in) in length, but is usually around 20 cm (8 in).

== Habitat ==
The northern puffer inhabits bays, estuaries and protected coastal waters at depths of 10–183 m (33–600 ft) in the northwest Atlantic. It ranges from Florida (U.S.) to Newfoundland (Canada).

== Diet ==
The northern puffer feeds primarily on shellfish, and occasionally on finfish. Using its beak-like mouth it can extract shellfish from their shells and sometimes break the shells to obtain a meal. They will attack blue crabs, blowing water underneath to turn the crab over, then attack the underside before it can right itself.

== Life cycle ==
Northern puffers spawn from May through August in shallow water over sandy or muddy bottoms. The adhesive eggs are defended by the male until they hatch.
