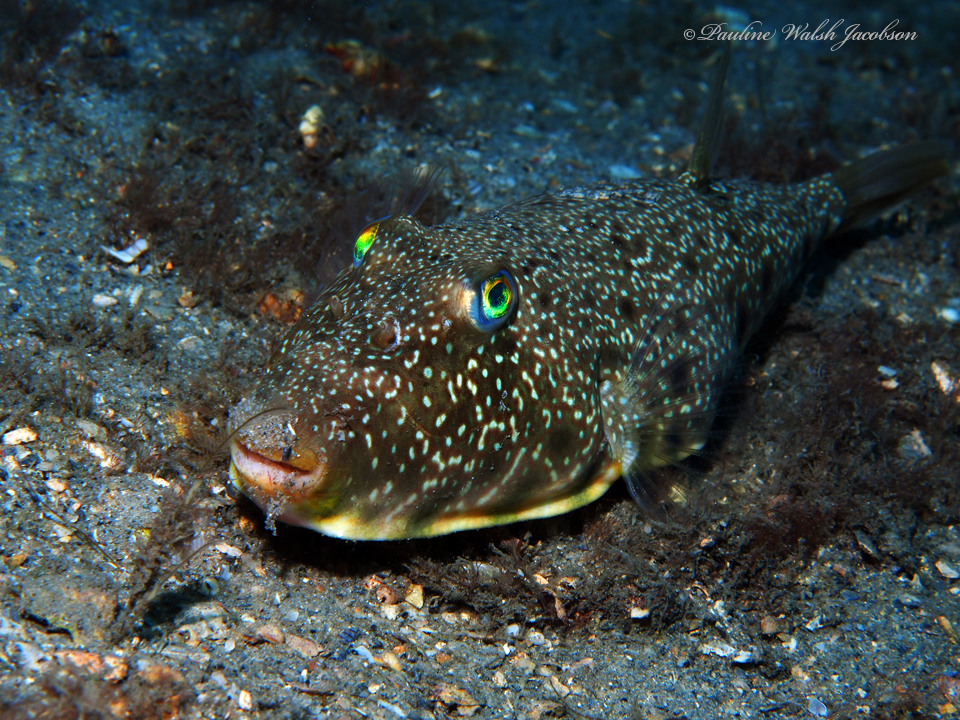

Scientific classification
- Kingdom: Animalia
- Phylum: Chordata
- Class: Actinopterygii
- Order: Tetraodontiformes
- Family: Tetraodontidae
- Genus: Sphoeroides
- Species: S. nephelus

Binomial name
- Sphoeroides nephelus (Goode & T. H. Bean, 1882)

= Southern puffer =

Species of fish

The southern puffer (Sphoeroides nephelus) is a species of pufferfish in the family Tetraodontidae. It is found in the Caribbean Sea, and possibly further south on the coast of Brazil.
