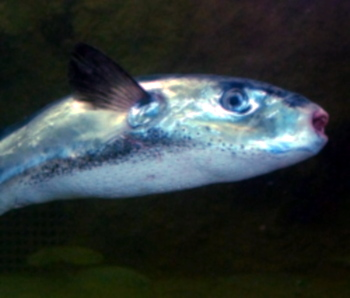

Conservation status
- Least Concern (IUCN 3.1)

Scientific classification
- Kingdom: Animalia
- Phylum: Chordata
- Class: Actinopterygii
- Order: Tetraodontiformes
- Family: Tetraodontidae
- Genus: Lagocephalus
- Species: L. lagocephalus

Binomial name
- Lagocephalus lagocephalus (Linnaeus, 1758)

Synonyms
- Spheroides nitidus Griffin, 1921

= Oceanic puffer =

Species of fish

The oceanic puffer (Lagocephalus lagocephalus) is a pufferfish of the family Tetraodontidae, found in all tropical and subtropical oceans, at depths of between 10 and 475 m (30 and 1,560 ft). It is indigenous to the Pacific, Atlantic and Indian oceans as well as the Sea of Japan. It is rare in the Mediterranean Sea, especially in the eastern portion. Its length is up to 61 cm (24 in). It is thought to be responsible for fatal poisoning and should therefore not be eaten.

== Sources ==
- Froese, Rainer; Pauly, Daniel (eds.). "Lagocephalus lagocephalus". FishBase. May 2006 version.
- Tony Ayling & Geoffrey Cox, Collins Guide to the Sea Fishes of New Zealand, (William Collins Publishers Ltd, Auckland, New Zealand 1982) ISBN 0-00-216987-8
