= Siouan thinlip chub =

Scientific classification
- Kingdom: Animalia
- Phylum: Chordata
- Class: Actinopterygii
- Division: Teleostei
- Order: Cypriniformes
- Family: Leuciscidae
- Genus: Cyprinella
- Species: C. leptocheilus

Binomial name
- Cyprinella leptocheilus Tracy, Rohde & Jenkins, 2024

Species of freshwater fish

The Siouan thinlip chub (Cyprinella leptocheilus) is a species of freshwater ray-finned fish belonging to the family Leuciscidae, the shiners, daces and minnows. This species is found in North and South Carolina in the southeastern United States.

== Taxonomy ==
The Siouan thinlip chub was first formally described in 2024 by Bryn H. Tracy, Fred C. Rohde and Robert E. Jenkins, although the existence of an undescribed species, variously called Hybopsis n. sp., H. sp. cf. zanema, Cyprinella n. sp., and C. sp. cf. zanema, in the sand hills and upper coatsal plain of North and South Carolina had been known since the early 1970s. The Siouan thinlip chub is the sister species to the Santee chub (C. zanema), and both these species are sister to the thicklip chub (C. labrosa). This species is classified in the genus Cyprinella within the subfamily Pogonichthyinae, the American minnows and shiners, of the dace family Leuciscidae.

== Etymology ==
The Siouan thinlip chub was given the specific name leptocheilus means "thin lip" and refers to its comparatively smaller lips than the related species. This name had originally been put forward for this taxon by Robert E. Jenkins and Ernest A. Lachner in the early 1970s. The common name of the Siouan thinlip chub comes from various Indian tribes which were believed at the time to speak Siouan languages such as the Cheraw, Chicora, Waccamaw, and Pee Dee who historically lived in the area this species occurs in. This was similar to the Santee chub being named after the Santee people.

== Distribution and habitat ==
The Siouan thinlip chub is endemic to the Sand Hills and upper Coastal Plain streams in the Carolinas. More specifically it occurs in the drainages of the upper Coastal Plain streams in the Cape Fear River drainage in North Carolina and the Yadkin–Pee Dee River Basin in South Carolina. This species occurs in shallow pools in medium-sized, warm water creeks and rivers where the water may be clear or turbid, even in dark tannin colored waters, where there is a moderate current over sand or gravel streambeds.
