= Spotfin chub =

Conservation status
- Vulnerable (IUCN 3.1)

- Imperiled (NatureServe)

Scientific classification
- Kingdom: Animalia
- Phylum: Chordata
- Class: Actinopterygii
- Order: Cypriniformes
- Family: Leuciscidae
- Subfamily: Pogonichthyinae
- Genus: Erimonax; D. S. Jordan, 1924
- Species: E. monachus

Binomial name
- Erimonax monachus (Cope, 1868)

Synonyms
- Ceratichthys monachus Cope, 1868; Cyprinella monacha (Cope, 1868); Hybopsis monacha (Cope, 1868)

Species of fish

Spotfin chub (Erimonax monachus) is a species of freshwater ray-finned fish belonging to the family Leuciscidae, the shiners, daces and minnows. It is the only species in the monospecific genus Erimonax. This fish is endemic to the Tennessee River watershed. Its other common names include turquoise shiner and chromium shiner.

== Appearance and anatomy ==
Spotfin chub have an average length of 55 to 90 millimetres (2.2 to 3.5 in).

== Geographic distribution ==
The spotfin chub has a native range endemic to the Tennessee River drainage. This range includes five states: Alabama, Georgia, North Carolina, Virginia, and Tennessee. Current surveys show that spotfin chub has been extirpated from Alabama and Georgia. The only remaining populations are confined to four tributaries along the Tennessee River: the Little Tennessee, Emory, Buffalo, and Holston rivers.

Many anthropogenic changes are the cause for such a large population decline. Major disturbances include dams, sedimentation, introduction of invasive species, and wide-ranging fish kills. In 1957, a project aiming to enhance habitats for trout used ichthyocides to kill fish. By eliminating the competition, it was believed that trout would thrive.

== Ecology ==
Spotfins are born predominately benthic insectivores and become more open water as they mature. According to a study done with adult specimens from the Emory River, they prefer midge, black fly, and caddisfly larvae. Spotfins rely heavily on sight feeding.

Food is a leading factor for microhabitat preferences, and microhabitats differ seasonally. Spotfins streamlined body and eurythermal characteristics allows them to tolerate a wide range of habitats. During the summer and fall months, spotfins are most likely found in clear, warm water stretches of rivers that resemble run habitats. These runs consist of boulder/bedrock substrates with medium to moderate depth and velocity. However, during the winter they are most commonly found in pool habitats with a sandy substrate. Due to similar habitat requirements and desired prey they tend to compete with other minnow species. Their most common competitors of the genus Cyprinella, primarily whitetail shiners (Cyprinella galactura), and the genus Luxilus, such as the warpaint shiner (Luxilus coccogenis). Humans are also competing for habitat. Flooding and sedimentation are both results of impounding water and harvesting riparian vegetation.

== Life history ==
They spawn in areas with clean running water between May and August. The timing of spawning varies based on temperature and photoperiod. Breeding males' bodies will turn a metallic blue with their fins forming a white margin. Males will then select the site and deposit milt along the length of the crevice to attract the female. Spotfins spawn on stream bottoms where boulders create crevices. Females deposit their eggs in the crevice which is then fertilized by the male. Clutch size has been difficult to determine, but studies have shown the number to be in the low to mid hundreds per breeding pair. Any eggs not concealed by the crevice are quickly cannibalized by either of the parents. Eggs have an incubation period of about six days. They grow rapidly as embryos while remaining benthic for approximately 30 days. Juveniles will then enter the water column and begin feeding on macroinvertebrates. After two years, most spotfin chub have reached sexual maturity. Spotfin chub have a lifespan of three years.

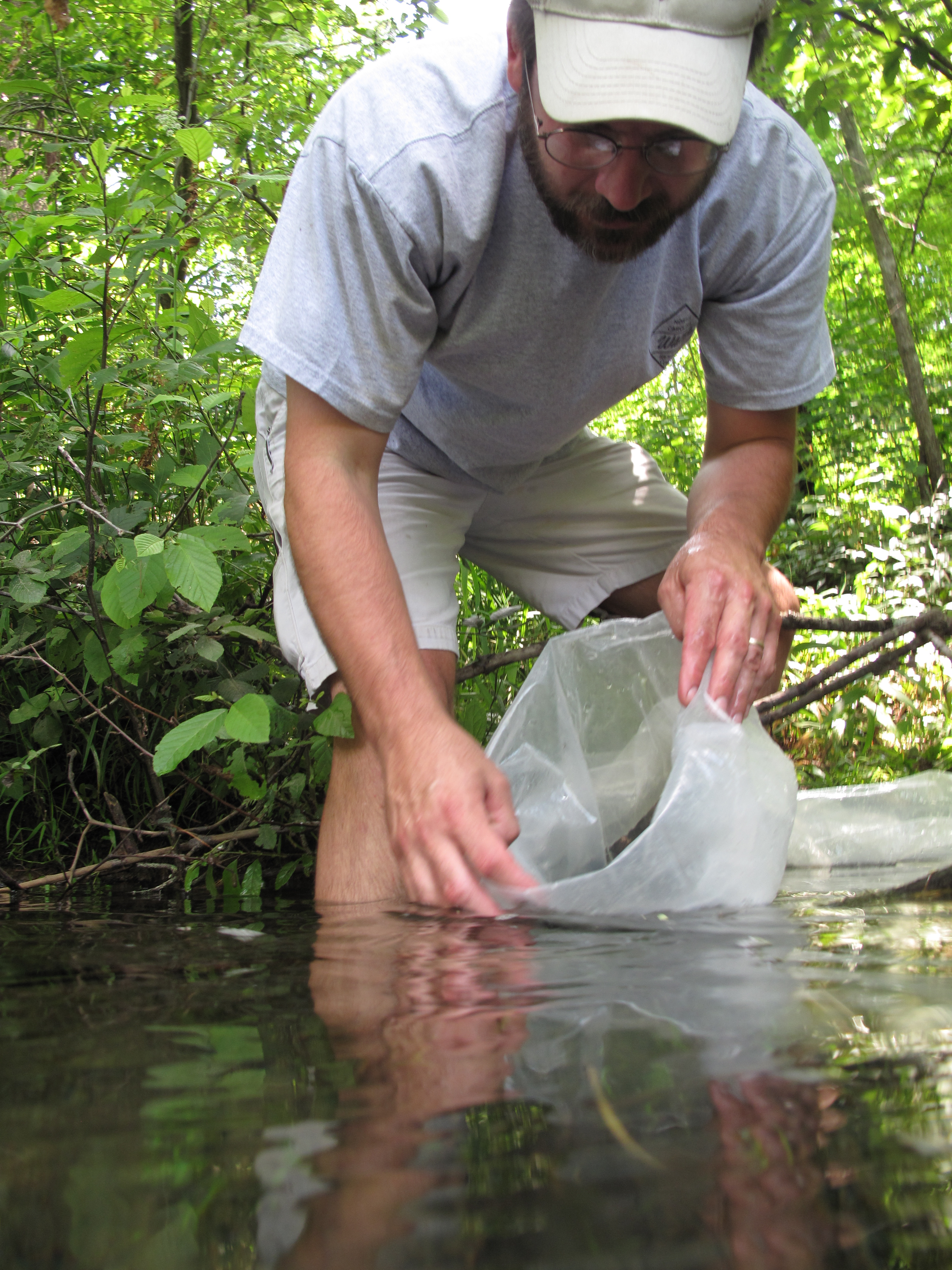
FWS employee introducing river water to a bag of spotfin chubs

== Current management ==
In 1977, spotfin chub became federally listed as threatened under the Endangered Species Act. Habitat loss, sedimentation, and dams have severely damaged the sustainability of its population. Sedimentation is detrimental to spotfin chub: a 2006 laboratory test done at the University of Georgia showed that densely suspended sediment levels in the water can result in a 15-fold decrease in growth rates of juveniles. Suspended sediment also damages gill tissues which impairs respiration and osmoregulatory patterns.

Organized efforts by many state, federal, and non-profit organizations have helped to sustain spotfin populations for many years. Non-invasive capture and relocation from species abundant locations to low species abundance has helped to redistribute them to their once native ranges. Also, captive breeding efforts by Conservation Fisheries, Inc. and other organizations have increased knowledge of breeding patterns, life history, and microhabitat requirements.
