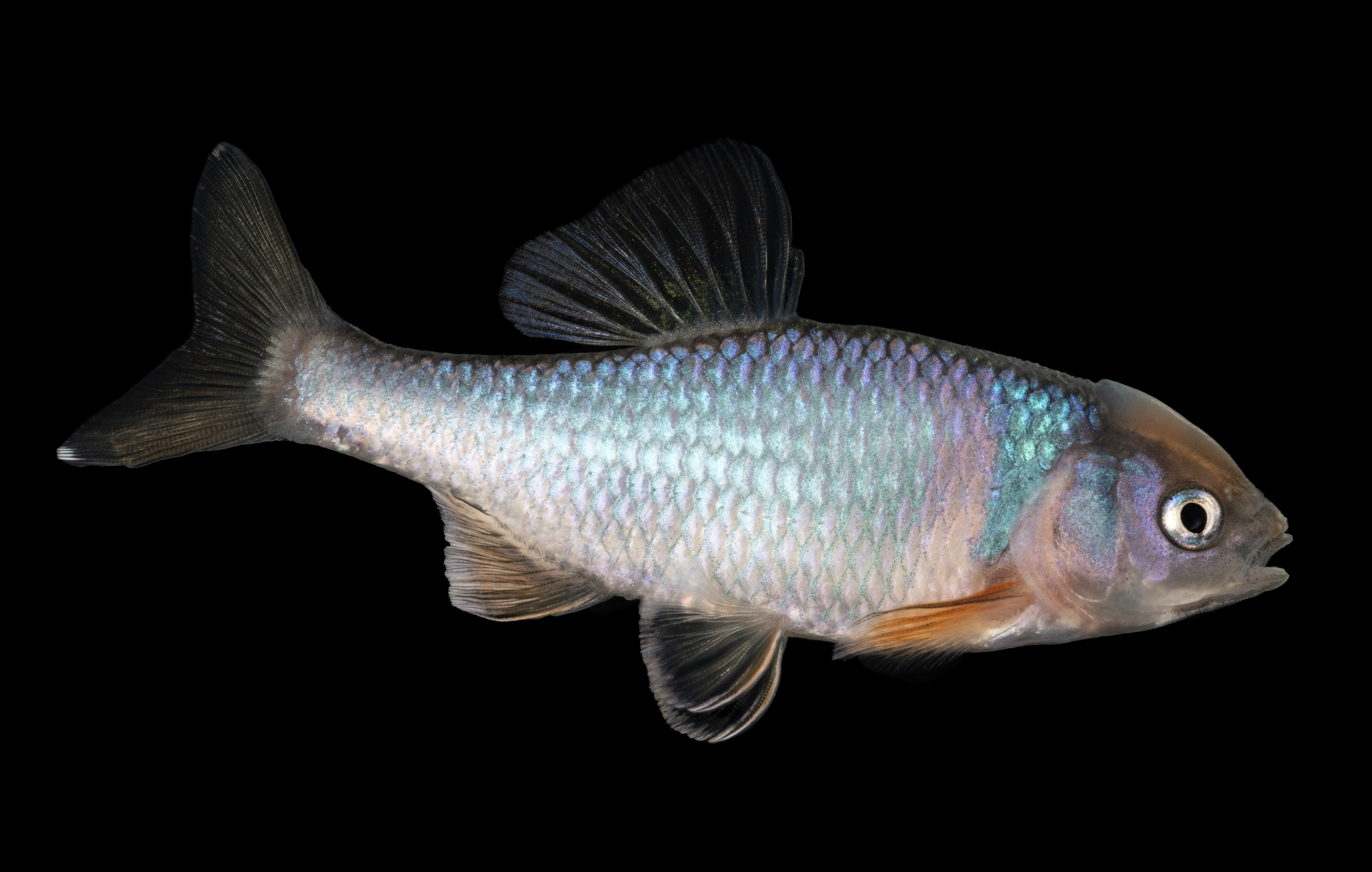
- Breeding male

Conservation status
- Least Concern (IUCN 3.1)

Scientific classification
- Kingdom: Animalia
- Phylum: Chordata
- Class: Actinopterygii
- Order: Cypriniformes
- Family: Leuciscidae
- Subfamily: Pogonichthyinae
- Genus: Cyprinella
- Species: C. lutrensis

Binomial name
- Cyprinella lutrensis S. F. Baird & Girard, 1853

Synonyms
- List: Leuciscus lutrensis Baird & Girard, 1853; Notropis lutrensis (Baird & Girard, 1853); Leuciscus bubalinus Baird & Girard, 1853; Cyprinella beckwithi Girard, 1856; Moniana complanata Girard, 1856; Moniana couchi Girard, 1856; Moniana frigida Girard, 1856; Moniana gibbosa Girard, 1856; Cyprinella gunnisoni Girard, 1856; Moniana laetabilis Girard, 1856; Moniana leonina Girard, 1856; Cyprinella luxiloides Girard, 1856; Moniana pulchella Girard, 1856; Cyprinella suavis Girard, 1856; Cyprinella umbrosa Girard, 1856; Cyprinella billingsiana Cope, 1871; Moniana jugalis Cope, 1871; Hypsilepis iris Cope, 1875; Cyprinella forbesi D. S. Jordan, 1878; Nototropis forlonensis Meek, 1904; Notropis lutrensis blairi Hubbs, 1940

= Red shiner =

Species of fish

The red shiner or red-horse minnow (Cyprinella lutrensis) is a species of freshwater ray-finned fish in the family Leuciscidae, the shiners, daces and minnows. They are deep-bodied and laterally compressed, and can grow to about 3 inches (7.6 cm) in length. For most of the year, both males and females have silver sides and whitish abdomens. Males in breeding coloration, though, have iridescent pink-purple-blue sides and a red crown and fins (except the dorsal fin which remains dark).

Red shiners can live up to three years. They are omnivorous; they eat both aquatic and terrestrial invertebrates, as well as algae. Red shiners have also been known to eat the eggs and larvae of native fish found in locations where they have been introduced.

== Reproduction ==
The spawning season for red shiners is generally from mid-April through September. In addition to spawning in crevices like other members of the genus Cyprinella, red shiners also broadcast their eggs and attach them to rocks or vegetation. Females can release up to 16 batches per day with up to 71 eggs per batch. The average clutch size, however, is 585 eggs and they may have five to 19 clutches in one reproductive season. Red shiners are capable of generating viable hybrid offspring with closely related species, such as the blue shiner and the blacktail shiner.

== Habitat ==
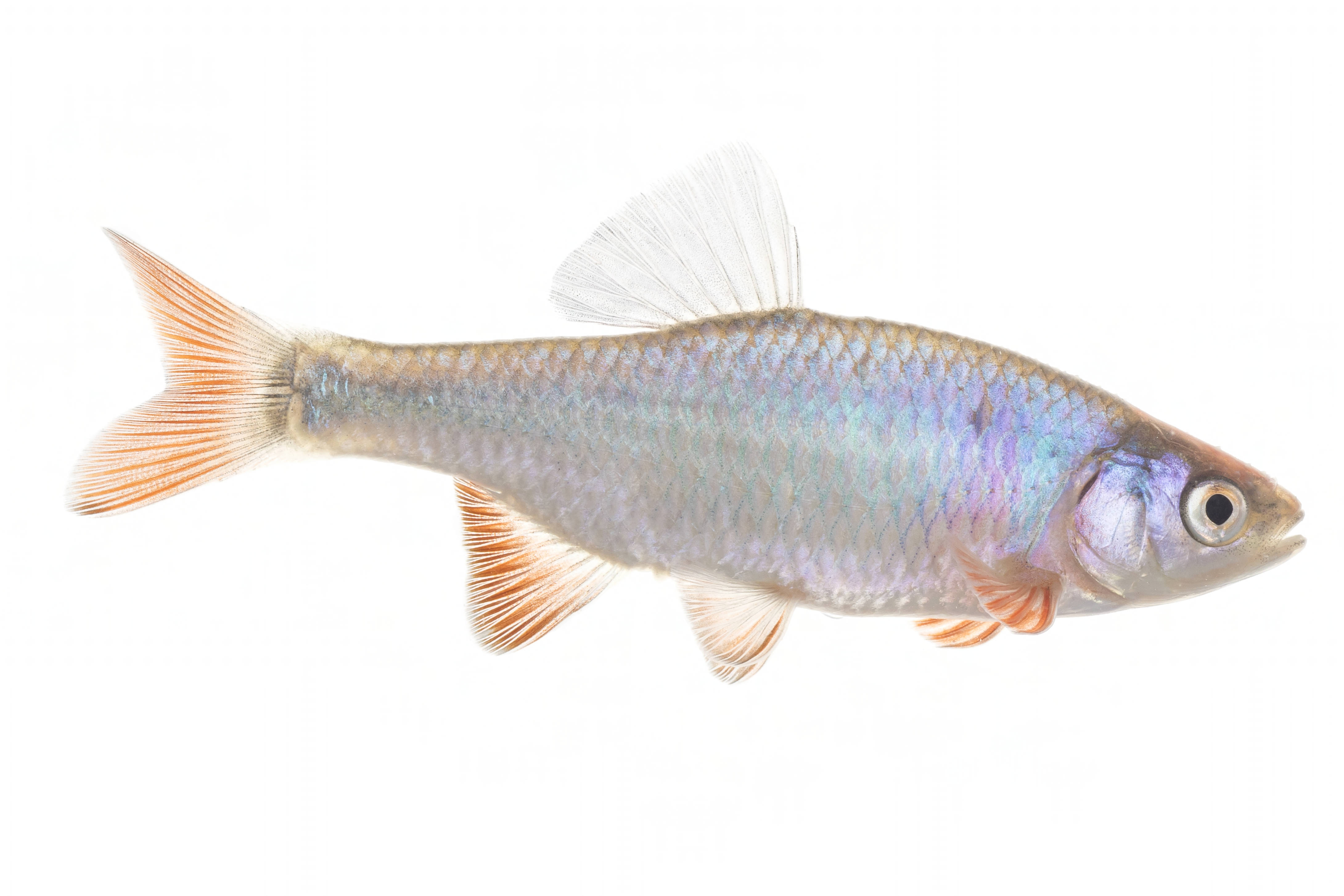
At Gavins Point National Fish Hatchery

Red shiners are found naturally in a variety of aquatic habitats, including backwaters, creek mouths, streams containing sand and silt substrates, riffles, and pools. They are tolerant of areas of frequent high turbidity and siltation, but they tend to avoid waters with high acidity. Red shiner are habitat generalists in that they are adapted to favor a wide range of environmental conditions that are not ideal to most other fish species. These include habitats degraded by human disturbance, and those with poor water quality (such as polluted waterways), natural physiochemical extremes, and seasonally intermittent flows.

== Range ==
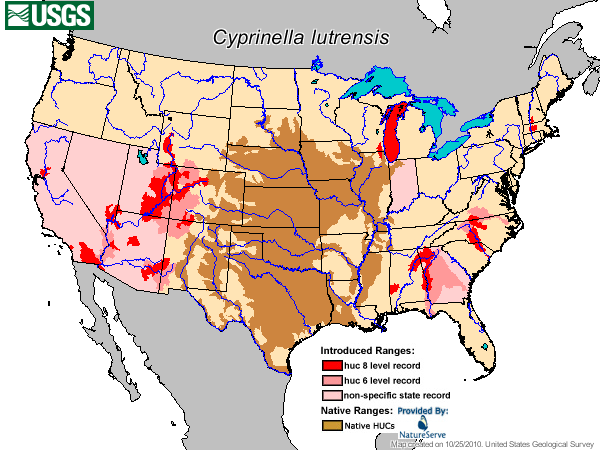
Map of the native and non-native distribution of red shiners (Cyprinella lutrensis) in the United States

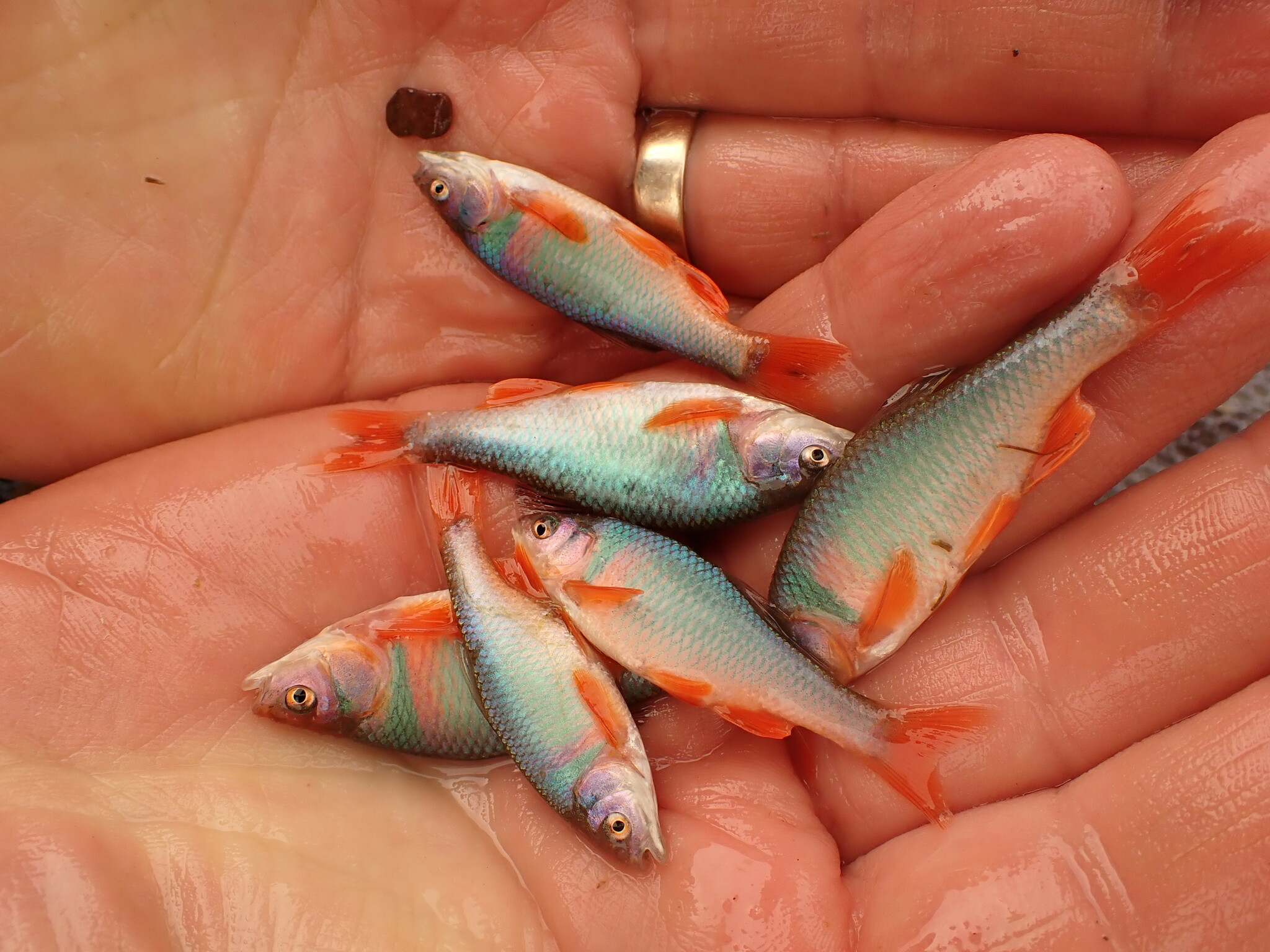
In Texas

The red shiner is naturally found in the Mississippi River basin from southern Wisconsin and eastern Indiana to South Dakota and Wyoming and south to Louisiana. It is also found as an introduced species in Arizona, Alabama, California, Colorado, Illinois, Georgia, Nebraska, North Carolina, South Carolina, Wyoming, Massachusetts, Utah, Virginia, Nevada, and New Mexico. Although the species is overall widespread and common, the subspecies from Maravillas Creek in Texas (Cyprinella lutrensis blairi) became extinct in the late 1950s due to competition from the invasive plains killifish.

== Invasiveness ==
The red shiner is a common bait fish, and the emptying of bait buckets containing them is believed to be the main cause of introduction of this species into new areas. It is also commonly used as an aquarium fish. It has become a species of special concern in the United States, as it has been implicated in the decline of native fish populations in the areas where it has been introduced. As previously mentioned, red shiners have been known to eat the eggs of native fish and in doing so hinder the growth of those populations. They are also adapted to thrive in a variety of environments, and as generalists, may be better able to persist in disturbed habitats than native species of those areas. Red shiners are capable of hybridizing with the blacktail shiner (Cyprinella venusta stigmatura), a native species found in the Coosa River, which serves to dilute the gene pool of this species.
