= Whitefin =

Whitefin may refer to:

== Animals ==
- Whitefin chimaera
- Whitefin dogfish
- Whitefin dolphin
- Whitefin hammerhead
- Whitefin shark
- Whitefin sharksucker
- Whitefin shiner
- Whitefin surgeonfish
- Whitefin swellshark
- Whitefin topeshark
- Whitefin trevally

== Other uses ==
- Whitefin (yacht), a sailing super yacht
