= Conchos shiner =

Conservation status
- Near Threatened (IUCN 3.1)

Scientific classification
- Kingdom: Animalia
- Phylum: Chordata
- Class: Actinopterygii
- Order: Cypriniformes
- Family: Leuciscidae
- Subfamily: Pogonichthyinae
- Genus: Cyprinella
- Species: C. panarcys

Binomial name
- Cyprinella panarcys (C. L. Hubbs & R. R. Miller, 1978)

Synonyms
- Notropis panarcys Hubbs & Miller, 1978

Species of fish

The Conchos shiner (Cyprinella panarcys) is a species of freshwater ray-finned fish in the family Leuciscidae, the shiners, daces and minnows. This species is endemic to Mexico.
