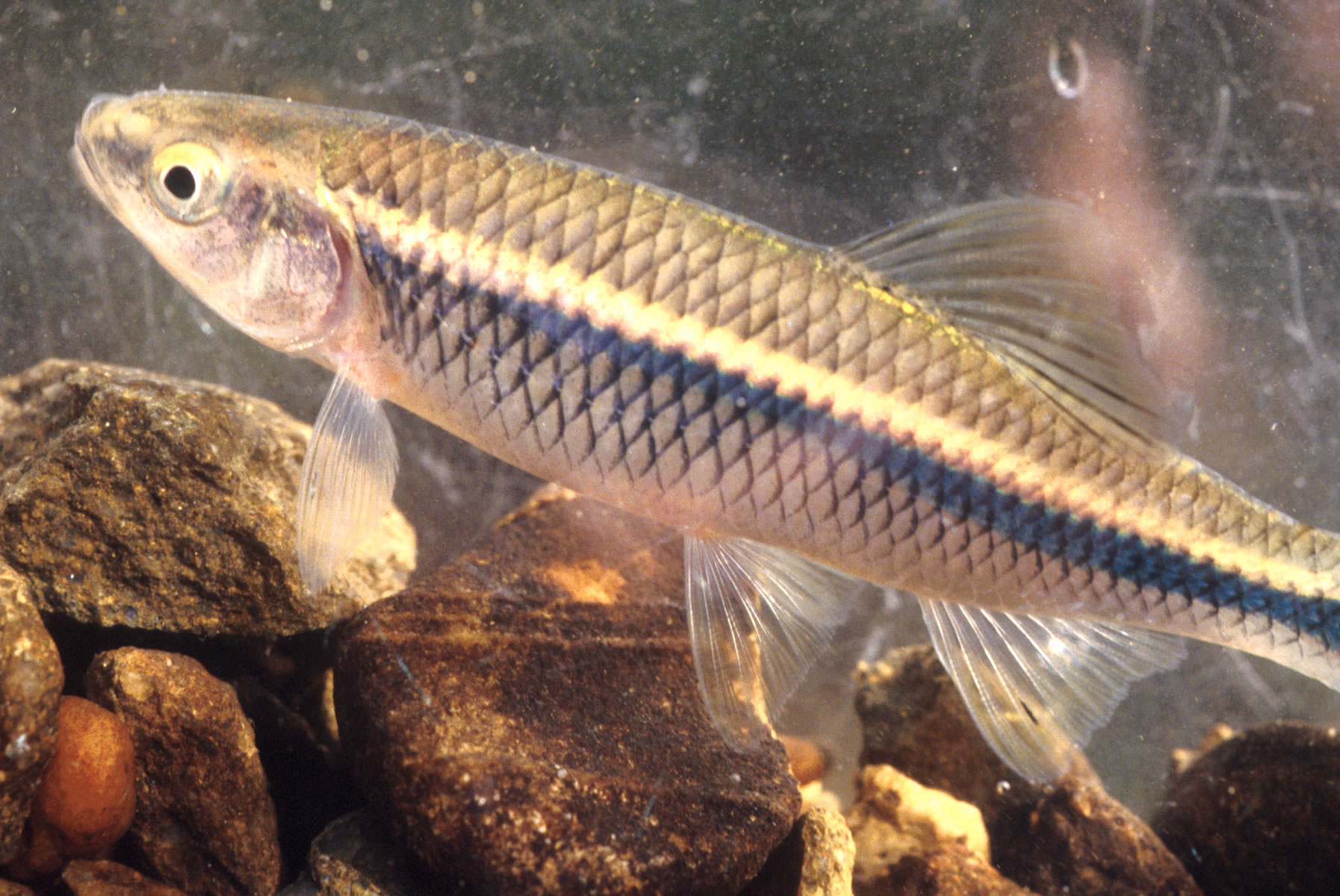

Conservation status
- Endangered (IUCN 3.1)

Scientific classification
- Kingdom: Animalia
- Phylum: Chordata
- Class: Actinopterygii
- Order: Cypriniformes
- Family: Leuciscidae
- Subfamily: Pogonichthyinae
- Genus: Cyprinella
- Species: C. caerulea

Binomial name
- Cyprinella caerulea (D. S. Jordan, 1877)

Synonyms
- Photogenis caeruleus D. S. Jordan, 1877; Notropis caeruleus (D. S. Jordan, 1877)

= Blue shiner =

Species of fish

The blue shiner (Cyprinella caerulea) is a species of freshwater ray-finned fish in the family Leuciscidae, the shiners, daces and minnows. It is native to the southeastern United States, where it is endemic to the Cahaba and Coosa River systems of the Mobile River Basin. This is a federally listed threatened species under the Endangered Species Act of the United States.

== Geographic distribution ==
C. caerulea is endemic to the basin of the Mobile River. Because of population declines, it is now restricted to the Coosa River system in four disjunct populations in northeast Alabama, northwest Georgia, and southeast Tennessee.

Within the Coosa River system, the fish was native to Choccolocco Creek, the Little River, Weogufka Creek, and Big Wills Creek in Alabama; the Coosawattee River the Oostanaula River in Georgia, and the Conasauga River in Georgia and Tennessee. The causes of the population declines are not fully clear, but they are likely due to the degradation of habitat and water degradation caused by urbanization, pollution, and sedimentation. The extirpation from the Cahaba River in Alabama could be due to extensive urban development. Efforts are currently being made to reverse the effects of habitat and water degradation. If they are successful, the blue shiner may be delisted.

== Biology ==
The blue shiner is a temperate, freshwater fish that occupies benthopelagic zones in streams. It occurs in second to fourth order streams with a moderate to low river currents, favoring sand and gravel substrates, and sometimes cobble. It generally remains at depths of 0.15 to 1 meter. It requires clear waters for feeding, because it is a visual drift feeder, taking invertebrates from the drift of the water column. Excess sedimentation in the habitat has an adverse effect on the fish, hindering its ability to feed.

The spawning behavior of this species is similar to that of C. trichroistia and C. gibbsi. A single male will protect a territory and females arrive to deposit eggs. During spawning, the female forcefully sprays eggs into crevices. It does not engage in parental care. Adequate water flows are required to remove debris and sediment, keeping open the crevices that the fish requires for egg deposition. Clear waters are also required for the females to visualize the males, which perform displays to attract them.

The spawning season of the blue shiner starts in early May and ends in late August. It may produce more than one clutch per season. The life span of the fish is about three years, with two-year-old individuals producing the most spawn.

== Conservation ==
With water degradation being one of the main reasons for decline, conservation activities are focused on improving water quality. Construction near waterways should be reduced, as should dam-building and water pollution.

Currently, the largest population of C. caerulea is in the Conasauga River. This has become the focus of conservation efforts and research. Estimations of abundance are made by assessing individual subpopulations. Research activities include sampling using electrofishing and netting.
