= Fieryblack shiner =

Conservation status
- Least Concern (IUCN 3.1)

Scientific classification
- Kingdom: Animalia
- Phylum: Chordata
- Class: Actinopterygii
- Division: Teleostei
- Order: Cypriniformes
- Family: Leuciscidae
- Subfamily: Pogonichthyinae
- Genus: Cyprinella
- Species: C. pyrrhomelas

Binomial name
- Cyprinella pyrrhomelas (Cope, 1870)

Synonyms
- Notropis pyrrhomelas (Cope, 1870); Photogenis pyrrhomelas Cope, 1870

Species of fish

The fieryblack shiner (Cyprinella pyrrhomelas) is a species of freshwater ray-finned fish in the family Leuciscidae, the shiners, daces and minnows. It is endemic to the United States, where it occurs in the Santee and Pee Dee river drainages in North and South Carolina.

== Description ==
The fieryblack shiner is a small fish, 47-110 millimeters, with vertical, diamond-shaped scales that are characteristic of the Cyprinella genus. Markings include a red snout, a narrow black stripe along the black, a black edge on the caudal fin, and a black back on the sides of the head behind the gill cover. During breeding season, males' snouts turn bright red, their backs turn blue, the caudal fin is marked with a bright red and white band, and all other fins turn white. Males use their large and colorful fins for mating displays during breeding. Males have been observed circling each other with fins flared in a territorial display.

Females deposit eggs in sheltered locations such as submerged logs and crevices. They spawn multiple times between May and June, rather than releasing eggs all at once.

== Distribution and habitat ==
Fieryblack shiners are found in North and South Carolina, above the Fall Line from the Piedmont Region to the mountains in the Pee Dee and Santee rivers. It requires cool, clear water in creeks and small to moderately sized rivers.

Prior to 1990, the fieryblack shiner was not present in the watershed of the Savannah River, but surveys have identified them in the Chattooga River system. It is likely that they were introduced to the new location through releases from bait buckets.

== Status ==
The fieryblack shiner is not listed federally or in either North or South Carolina as a species of special concern. They are considered secure in North Carolina, though there are concerns for their long-term status because of their limited distribution. Information on population size and status is also limited.

=== Threats ===
The fieryblack shiner faces many of the same challenges as those by other fish species: pollution, deforestation, encroaching human development, and siltation from poor land use practices. The development of I-85 between Charlotte, North Carolina and Greenville, South Carolina poses potential risk to this and other fish species.
