= Tallapoosa shiner =

Conservation status
- Least Concern (IUCN 3.1)

Scientific classification
- Kingdom: Animalia
- Phylum: Chordata
- Class: Actinopterygii
- Order: Cypriniformes
- Family: Leuciscidae
- Subfamily: Pogonichthyinae
- Genus: Cyprinella
- Species: C. gibbsi

Binomial name
- Cyprinella gibbsi W. M. Howell & J. D. Williams, 1971

Species of fish

The Tallapoosa shiner (Cyprinella gibbsi) is a species of freshwater ray-finned fish in the family Leuciscidae, the shiners, daces and minnows. It is endemic to the United States, where it occurs in the Tallapoosa River system in Alabama and Georgia.
