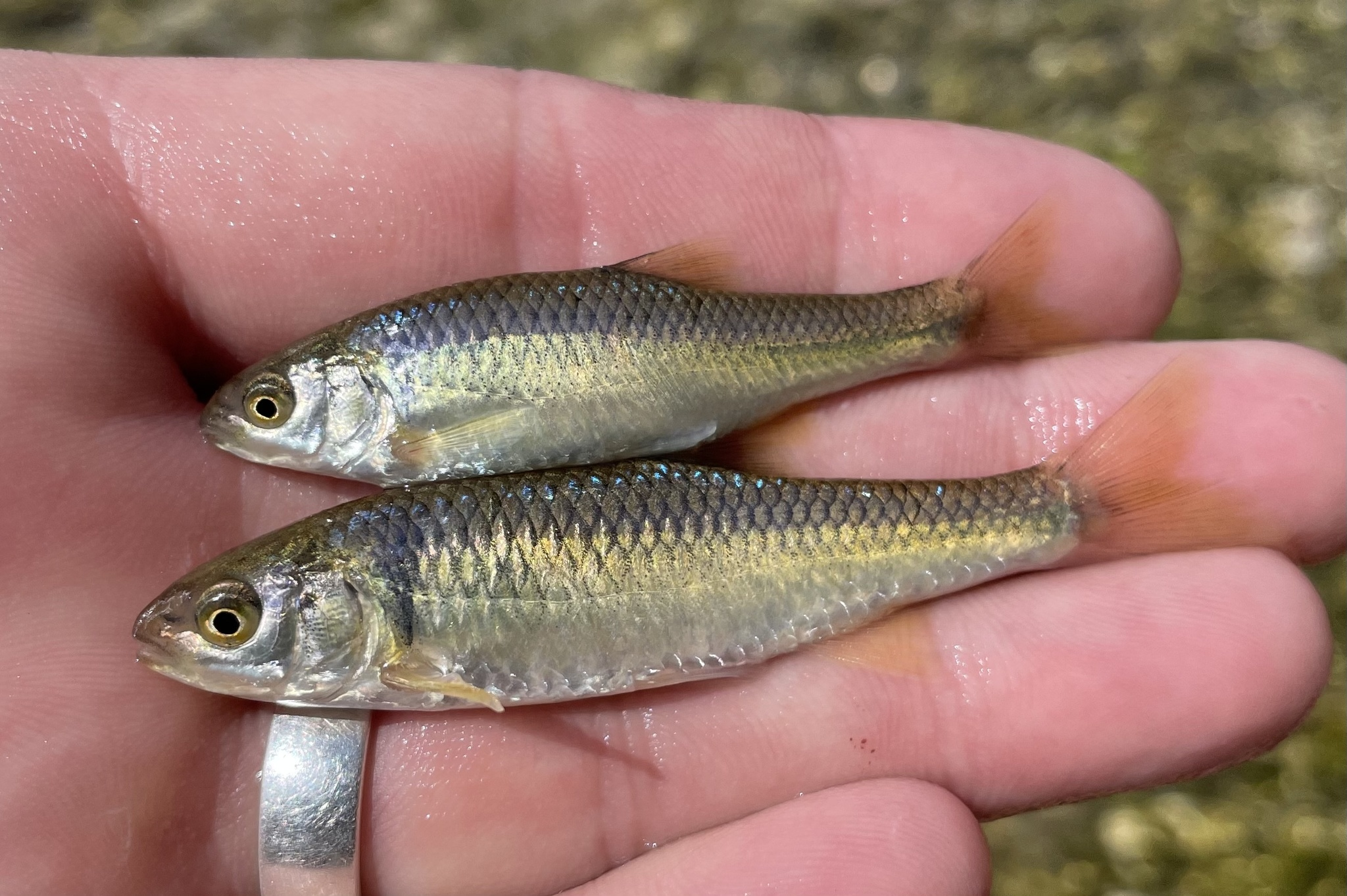

Conservation status
- Endangered (IUCN 3.1)

Scientific classification
- Kingdom: Animalia
- Phylum: Chordata
- Class: Actinopterygii
- Order: Cypriniformes
- Family: Leuciscidae
- Subfamily: Pogonichthyinae
- Genus: Cyprinella
- Species: C. lepida

Binomial name
- Cyprinella lepida Girard, 1856

Synonyms
- Notropis lepidus (Girard, 1856)

= Plateau shiner =

Species of fish

The Plateau shiner (Cyprinella lepida) is a species of freshwater ray-finned fish in the family Leuciscidae, the shiners, daces and minnows. It is endemic to the United States, where it occurs on the Edwards Plateau in Texas where it inhabits the upper Guadalupe and Nueces River drainages.
