= Atoyac chub =

Conservation status
- Near Threatened (IUCN 3.1)

Scientific classification
- Kingdom: Animalia
- Phylum: Chordata
- Class: Actinopterygii
- Order: Cypriniformes
- Family: Leuciscidae
- Subfamily: Pogonichthyinae
- Genus: Graodus
- Species: G. cumingii

Binomial name
- Graodus cumingii (Günther, 1868)

Synonyms
- Ceratichthys cumingii Günther, 1868; Notropis cumingii (Günther, 1868)

Species of fish

The Atoyac chub (Graodus cumingii) is a species of freshwater ray-finned fish belonging to the family Leuciscidae, the shiners, daces and minnows. It is endemic to Mexico.
