= Ocmulgee shiner =

Conservation status
- Least Concern (IUCN 3.1)

Scientific classification
- Kingdom: Animalia
- Phylum: Chordata
- Class: Actinopterygii
- Order: Cypriniformes
- Family: Leuciscidae
- Subfamily: Pogonichthyinae
- Genus: Cyprinella
- Species: C. callisema

Binomial name
- Cyprinella callisema (Jordan, 1877)

Synonyms
- Episema callisema Jordan, 1877; Notropis callisema (Jordan, 1877)

Species of fish

The Ocmulgee shiner (Cyprinella callisema) is a species of freshwater ray-finned fish in the family Leuciscidae, the shiners, daces and minnows. It is endemic to the United States where it occurs in the Altamaha and Ogeechee river drainages in Georgia. It was first described in a book about fishes of upper Georgia. The author, Davis Starr Jordan, is credited with describing more than 2,500 species of fish in his lifetime. He first described this fish in his book fishes of upper Georgia in 1877.

== Physical appearance ==
The Ocmulgee Shiner is a slender silver minnow with a blue sheen. Its notable lateral line span the entire length of its body. These minnows can grow to a maximum length of 9 cm It possesses six rayed fins: a forked caudal fin to assist in agile swimming, a pair of pectoral fins for vertical movement, a single dorsal, an anal and pelvic fin to maintain stability. These fins are a faint yellow and mostly translucent. It has a terminal mouth, meaning it is in the front and center of the head

== Geographic range and habitat ==
This Georgia native is a subtropical freshwater fish. It is endemic to central Georgia and predominately occupies the Ocmulgee and Oconee river basins. This shiner "Inhabits sandy and rocky runs of small to medium rivers " Its distribution ranges 34°N to 32°N.

== Life history ==
The Ocmulgee Shiner belongs to the family Cyprinidae, as all other fish in this family they are egg-layers. Not much is known about their eating habits, but it is assumed that they rely on invertebrates and vegetation.

== Status ==
According to the IUCN Red list status shows the likelihood of a species becoming extinct in the future. The Ocmulgee Shiner is a species of least concern and population trends are stable. The last known assessment occurred in 2011.

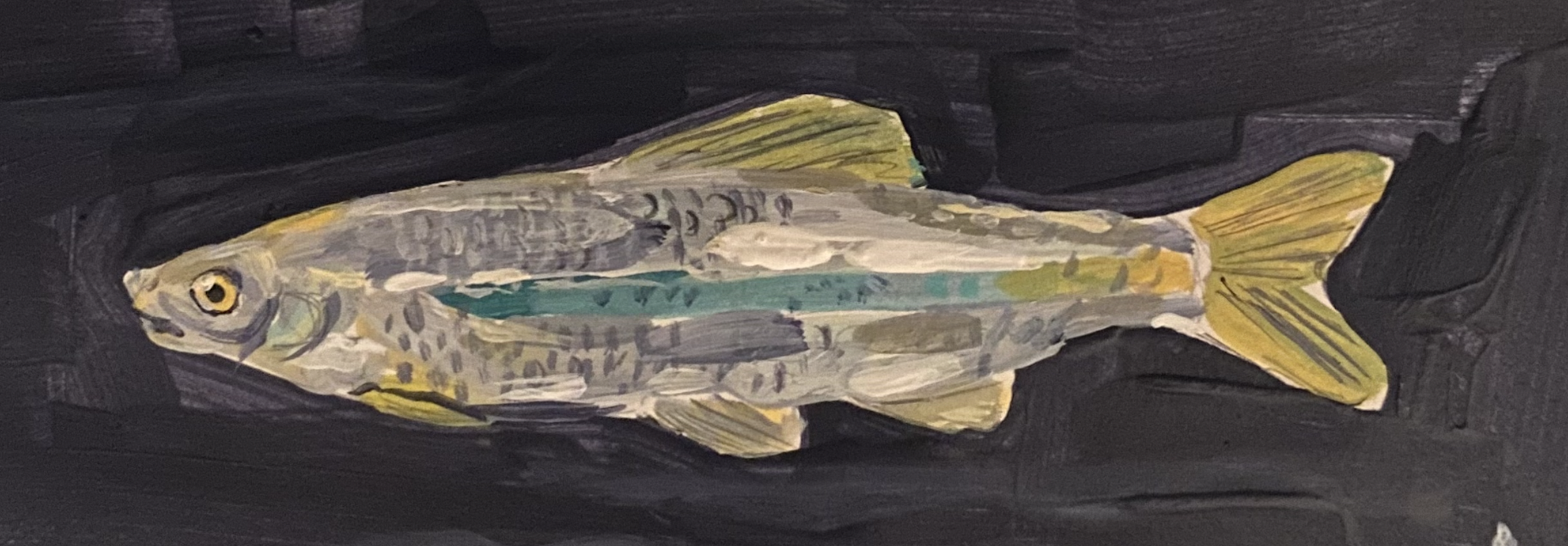
Ocmulgee shiner (Cyprinella callisema)
