= Balsas shiner =

Conservation status
- Endangered (IUCN 3.1)

Scientific classification
- Kingdom: Animalia
- Phylum: Chordata
- Class: Actinopterygii
- Order: Cypriniformes
- Family: Leuciscidae
- Subfamily: Pogonichthyinae
- Genus: Graodus
- Species: G. boucardi

Binomial name
- Graodus boucardi (Günther, 1868)

Synonyms
- Leuciscus boucardi Günther, 1868; Notropis boucardi (Günther 1868); Graodus nigrotaeniatus Günther, 1868

Species of fish

The Balsas shiner (Graodus boucardi) is a species of freshwater ray-finned fish belonging to the family Leuciscidae, the shiners, daces and minnows. This species is endemic to Mexico.

== Distribution and habitat ==
Earlier believed to be widespread in the Balsas River drainage, recent studies have shown that it is confined to a small system of streams in the vicinity of its type locality near Cuernavaca, as well as an endorheic spring in nearby Jiutepec, both in the state of Morelos. It inhabits shallow streams with a rocky bottom. The diet consists of insects such as simulids and chironomids.

== Description ==
Balsas shiner have an elongated body and can grow to 12 cm (4.7 in) total length. The mouth is sub-terminal. The body is silver in color, slightly darker dorsally, and with a black stripe that runs from the eye to the caudal fin. During the reproductive season that peaks in the winter, the ventral region develops bright red coloration.

== Conservation ==
Balsas shiner is considered threatened in Mexico, but its narrow range should qualify it as critically endangered. Because of its small range, threats to its habitat, and the introduction of exotic species, the International Union for Conservation of Nature (IUCN) has assessed it as "endangered".
