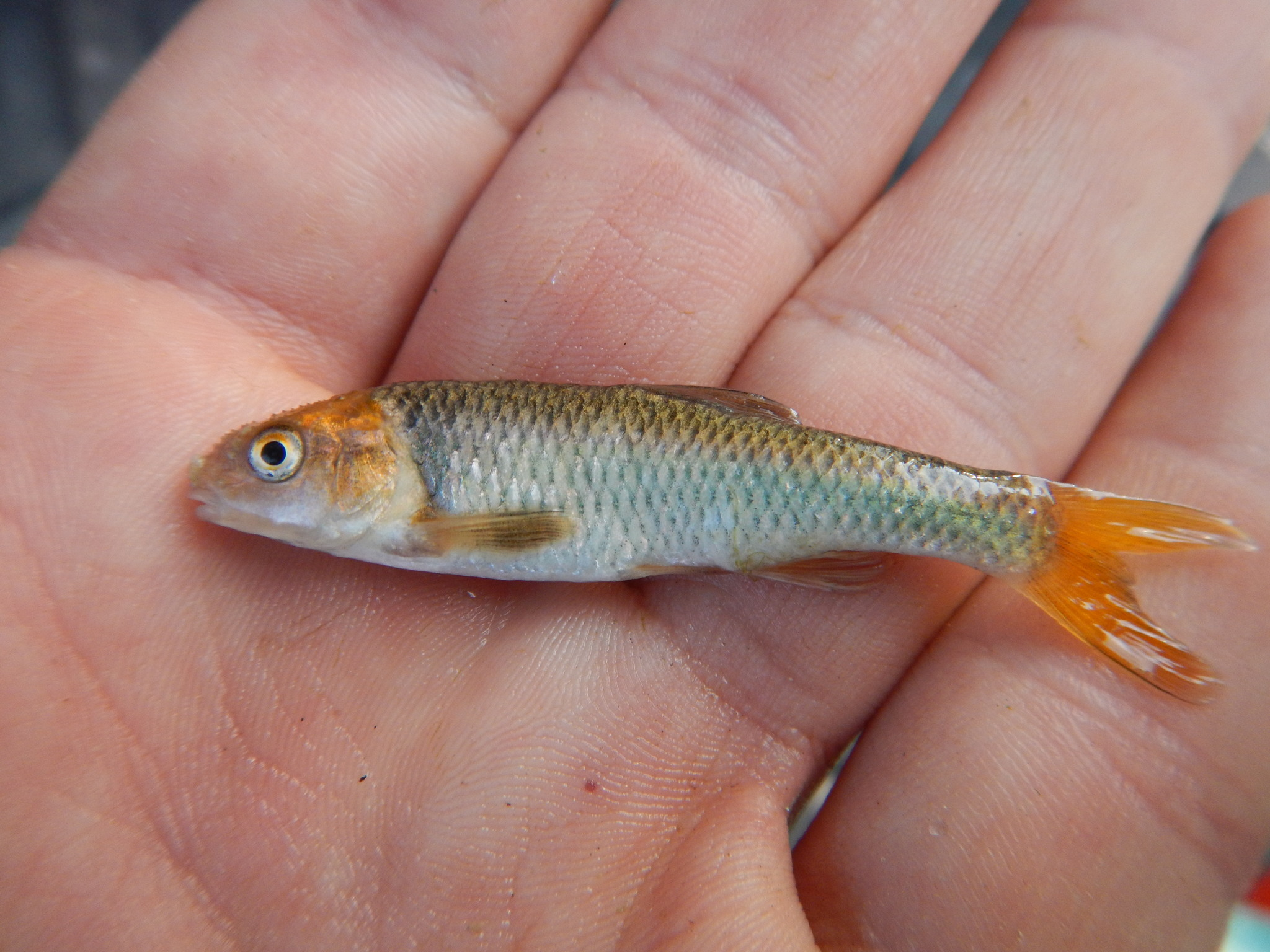
- In western Texas, US

Conservation status
- Least Concern (IUCN 3.1)

Scientific classification
- Kingdom: Animalia
- Phylum: Chordata
- Class: Actinopterygii
- Order: Cypriniformes
- Family: Leuciscidae
- Subfamily: Pogonichthyinae
- Genus: Cyprinella
- Species: C. proserpina

Binomial name
- Cyprinella proserpina (Girard, 1856)

Synonyms
- Moniana proserpina Girard, 1856; Notropis proserpinus (Girard, 1856); Moniana aurata Girard, 1856

= Proserpine shiner =

Species of fish

The Proserpine shiner (Cyprinella proserpina) is a species of freshwater ray-finned fish in the family Leuciscidae, the shiners, daces and minnows. It is found in Mexico and the United States. Its natural habitat is rivers.
