= Tepehuan shiner =

Conservation status
- Vulnerable (IUCN 3.1)

Scientific classification
- Kingdom: Animalia
- Phylum: Chordata
- Class: Actinopterygii
- Order: Cypriniformes
- Family: Leuciscidae
- Subfamily: Pogonichthyinae
- Genus: Cyprinella
- Species: C. alvarezdelvillari

Binomial name
- Cyprinella alvarezdelvillari Contreras-Balderas & Lozano-Vilano, 1994

Species of fish

The Tepehuan shiner (Cyprinella alvarezdelvillari) is a species of freshwater ray-finned fish in the family Leuciscidae, the shiners, daces and minnows. This species is endemic to Mexico. It was described as a new species from a stream in the headwaters of Nazas River in Arroyo del Péñon Blanco, upstream of Peñón Blanco, Durango. The specific name honors Dr. José Alvarez del Villar, the "founder of modern Mexican ichthyology".

The Tepehuan shiner is a small species that can grow up to 4.4 cm (1.7 in) standard length, but is usually smaller, less than 3.6 cm (1.4 in) SL. It is usually found in flowing water warmer than 29 °C (84 °F).
