= Altamaha shiner =

Conservation status
- Near Threatened (IUCN 3.1)

Scientific classification
- Kingdom: Animalia
- Phylum: Chordata
- Class: Actinopterygii
- Division: Teleostei
- Order: Cypriniformes
- Family: Leuciscidae
- Subfamily: Pogonichthyinae
- Genus: Cyprinella
- Species: C. xaenura

Binomial name
- Cyprinella xaenura D. S. Jordan, 1877

Synonyms
- Minnilus xaenurus Jordan, 1877; Notropis xaenurus (Jordan, 1877)

Species of fish

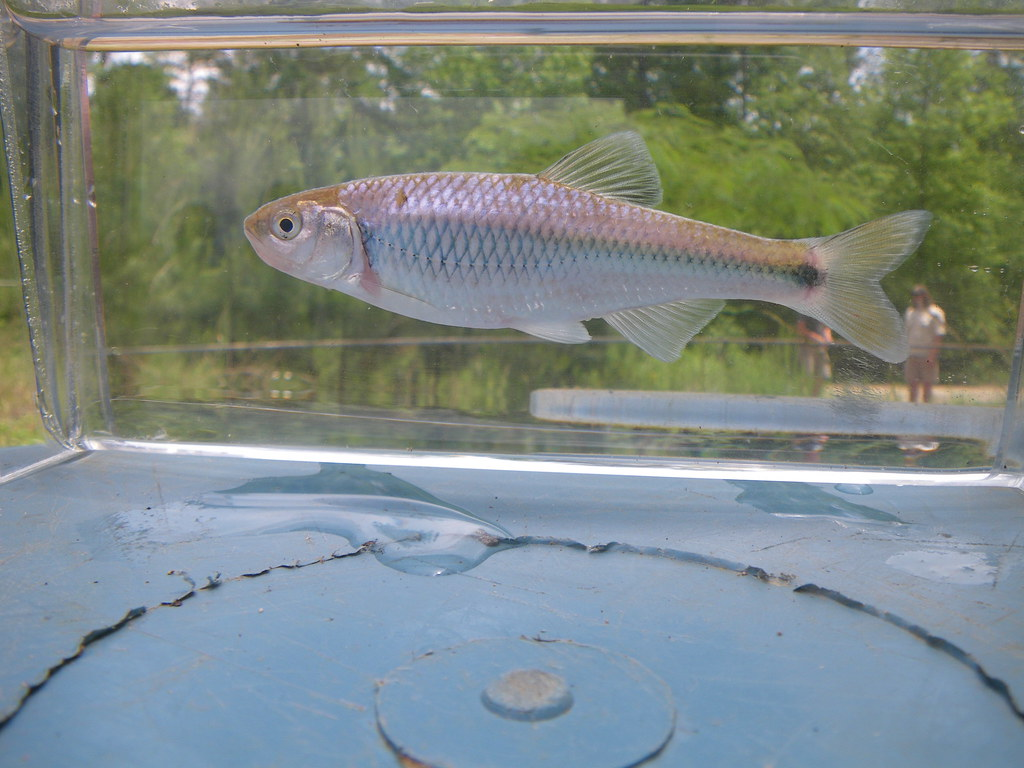
Altamaha shiner acquired from the Apalachee River.

The Altamaha shiner (Cyprinella xaenura) is a species of freshwater ray-finned fish in the family Leuciscidae, the shiners, daces and minnows. It is endemic to the Piedmont region of Georgia, where it occurs in the upper areas of the Altamaha River drainage area, primarily above the fall line in north-central Georgia.

== Physical appearance ==
The Altamaha shiner is a minnow. The maximum recorded length of an adult is 11 cm (4.5 in). Physical characteristics of the Altamaha shiner include a pointed snout and a terminal or slightly sub-terminal mouth. Coloration includes a dusky olive upper portion of the body, a dark streak along the back, and a silver-black stripe on the rear half of the body which is often spread into a distinct spot on the base of the caudal fin. Breeding males have multiple distinct features including one side of the body being blue, possessing white fins, and unique yellow to orange caudal, dorsal, and anal fins. Typically, there are 26 scales on the body. Of these, 16 are located around the caudal peduncle. This species has 10-11 anal rays, between 38-40 lateral scales, and pharyngeal teeth in a 1,4-4,1 pattern.

== Geographic range and habitat ==
The Altamaha shiner resides in the upper portions of the Oconee River and the Ocmulgee River. It is found nowhere else in the world. It prefers the habitat of small sandy and rocky pools; additionally, this minnow is typically found in small rivers, creeks, and streams.

== Life history ==
Very little is known about the life history of this elusive minnow. It is assumed that the Altamaha shiner eats aquatic insects or terrestrial insects which have been captured in stream drift. The Altamaha shiner lays its eggs in small crevices or small cracks within rocks.

== Threats ==
Damming of minor rivers and tributaries along the Oconee River and Ocmulgee River are the major threat to the Altamaha shiner. Degradation of stream quality is also a major threat to the Altamaha shiner. A lack of Best Management Practices has caused sedimentation to accumulate into the river systems; the accumulation of sediments is caused by a lack of Best Management Practices from forestry and agriculture, an increase in storm water drainage due to rapid urbanization, and sediments seeping into the river from construction sites. Excess sedimentation can disturb or destroy eggs which are laid in crevices or small cracks within rocks.

== Additional references ==
- Cook, J. (2019). Oconee River User's Guide. University of Georgia Press.
- H., C.; Dahlberg, Michael D. (1975-12-31). "A Guide to Coastal Fishes of Georgia and Nearby States". Copeia. 1975 (4): 789. doi:10.2307/1443346. ISSN 0045-8511.
- Freeman, M. C., Merrill, M. D., & Freeman, B. J. (2001). Ecological Considerations for Reservoir Planning in North Georgia. Georgia Institute of Technology.
- Froese, Rainer and Pauly, Daniel, eds. (2014). "Cyprinella xaenura" in FishBase. February 2014 version.
- Gibbs, R. H. Jr. 1957. Cyprinid fishes of the subgenus Cyprinella of Notropis. Vol. I. Systematic status of the subgenus Cyprinella, with a key to the species exclusive of the lutrensis ornatus complex. Copeia 1957: 185-195.
- Jelks, H.L., S.J. Walsh, N.M. Burkhead, S. Contreras-Balderas, E. Díaz-Pardo, D.A. Hendrickson, J. Lyons, N.E. Mandrak, F. McCormick, J.S. Nelson, S.P. Platania, B.A. Porter, C.B. Renaud, J.J. Schmitter-Soto, E.B. Taylor and M.L. Warren Jr., 2008. Conservation status of imperiled North American freshwater and diadromous fishes. Fisheries 33(8):372-407.
- Lee, S. L., C. R. Gilbert, C. H. Hocutt, R. E. Jenkins, D. E. McAllister, and J. R.Stauffer. 1980. Atlas of North American fishes. North Carolina State Mus. Nat. Hist. 867pp.
- Mayden, R.L. 1989. Phylogenetic studies of North American minnows, with emphasis on the genus Cyprinella (Teleostei: Cypriniformes). University of Kansas Museum Natural History Miscellaneous Publication 80: 1-189.
- NatureServe (2016). "Cyprinella xaenura". IUCN Red List of Threatened Species. 2016. Retrieved 14 April 2017.
- Nelson, J.S., E.J. Crossman, H. Espinosa-Pérez, L.T. Findley, C.R. Gilbert, R.N. Lea and J.D. Williams, 2004. Common and scientific names of fishes from the United States, Canada, and Mexico. American Fisheries Society, Special Publication 29, Bethesda, * Maryland. ix, 386 p. + 1 CD.
- Page, L.M. and B.M. Burr, 2011. A field guide to freshwater fishes of North America north of Mexico. Boston : Houghton Mifflin Harcourt, 663p. (Ref. 86798).
- Robins, C.R., R.M. Bailey, C.E. Bond, J.R. Brooker, E.A. Lachner, R.N. Lea and W.B. Scott, 1991. Common and scientific names of fishes from the United States and Canada. Am. Fish. Soc. Spec. Publ. (20):183.
