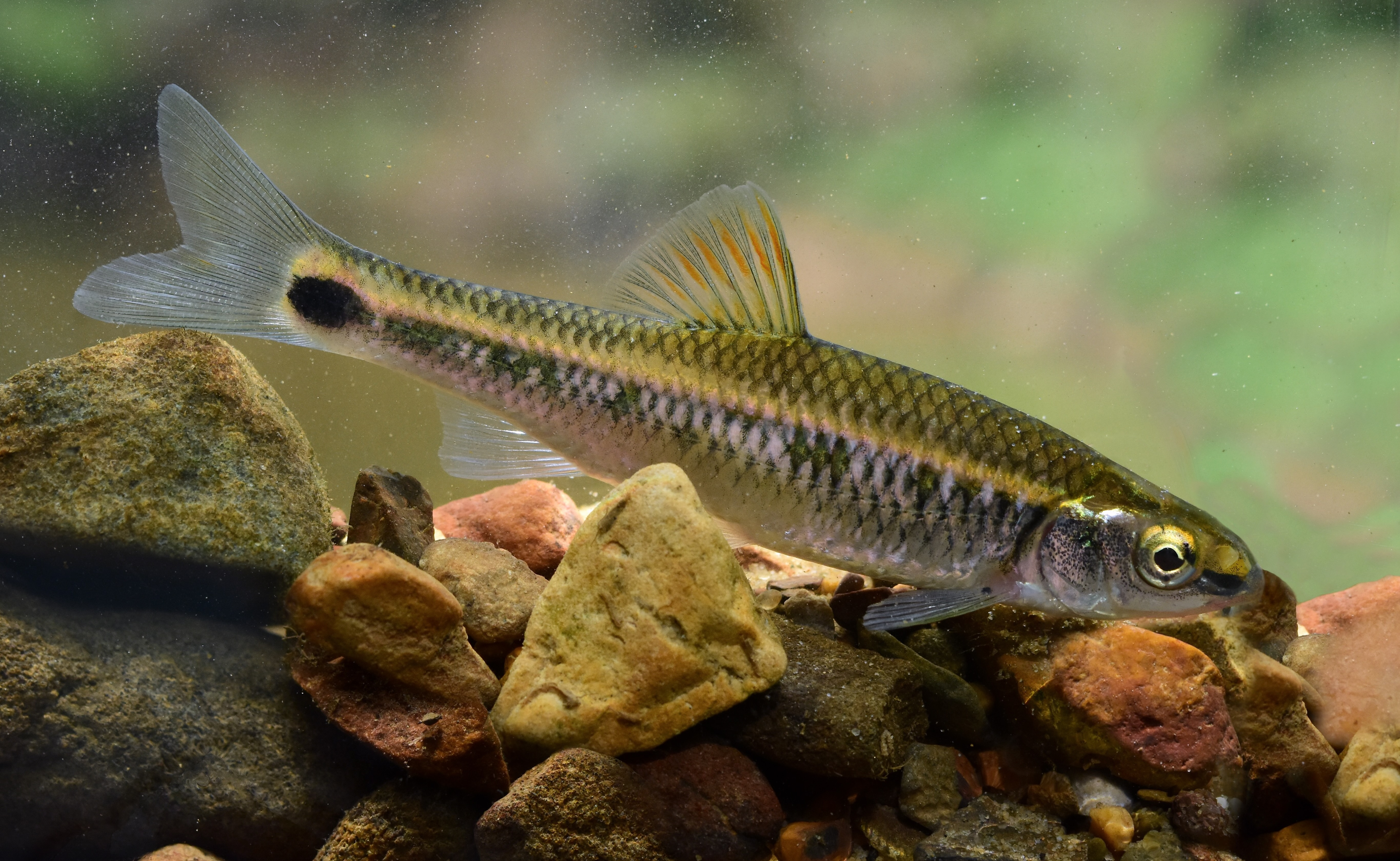

Conservation status
- Least Concern (IUCN 3.1)

Scientific classification
- Kingdom: Animalia
- Phylum: Chordata
- Class: Actinopterygii
- Order: Cypriniformes
- Family: Leuciscidae
- Subfamily: Pogonichthyinae
- Genus: Cyprinella
- Species: C. callistia

Binomial name
- Cyprinella callistia (Jordan, 1877)

Synonyms
- Photogenis callistius Jordan, 1877; Notropis callistius (Jordan, 1877)

= Alabama shiner =

Species of fish

The Alabama shiner (Cyprinella callistia) is a species of freshwater ray-finned fish in the family Leuciscidae, the shiners, daces and minnows. It is endemic to the United States where it occurs in the Alabama and Tombigbee river systems in Alabama, Georgia, eastern Mississippi, and extreme southeastern Tennessee.

== Ecology ==
This species can be found in gravel and bedrock bottomed pools and runs of small creeks and rivers. Juveniles typically inhabit quieter, slow-paced waters.

== Characteristics ==
The Alabama shiner reaches a maximum of 13 cm (5.1 in) and eats aquatic insects such as midge and blackfly larvae. Its physical characteristics include a bright orange/yellow tail and a black spot on the base of the tail. They have the largest breeding tubercles of the genus Cyprinella. These are horny projections on their head and body that aid in spawning. They are observed spawning in crevices between rocks. The mouth on the bottom of the head suggests bottom feeding. This species has diamond shaped scales and a compressed body.
