= Cyprinella eurystoma =

Scientific classification
- Kingdom: Animalia
- Phylum: Chordata
- Class: Actinopterygii
- Order: Cypriniformes
- Family: Leuciscidae
- Subfamily: Pogonichthyinae
- Genus: Cyprinella
- Species: C. eurystoma

Binomial name
- Cyprinella eurystoma Jordan, 1877

Synonyms
- Photogenis eurystomus Jordan, 1877

Species of fish

Cyprinella eurystoma , the Apalachicola blacktail shiner, is a species of freshwater ray-finned fish in the family Leuciscidae, the shiners, daces and minnows. It is endemic to the United States.
