= Greenfin shiner =

Conservation status
- Least Concern (IUCN 3.1)

Scientific classification
- Kingdom: Animalia
- Phylum: Chordata
- Class: Actinopterygii
- Order: Cypriniformes
- Family: Leuciscidae
- Subfamily: Pogonichthyinae
- Genus: Cyprinella
- Species: C. chloristia

Binomial name
- Cyprinella chloristia (D. S. Jordan and Brayton, 1878)

Synonyms
- Codoma chloristia Jordan & Brayton, 1878; Notropis chloristius (Jordan & Brayton, 1878)

Species of fish

The greenfin shiner (Cyprinella chloristia) is a species of freshwater ray-finned fish in the family Leuciscidae, the shiners, daces and minnows. It is endemic to the United States, where it occurs in the Santee River drainage in North Carolina and South Carolina, and the Peedee River drainage in South Carolina.This species reaches a length of 7.5 cm (3.0 in)
