= Gibbous shiner =

Conservation status
- Data Deficient (IUCN 3.1)

Scientific classification
- Kingdom: Animalia
- Phylum: Chordata
- Class: Actinopterygii
- Order: Cypriniformes
- Family: Leuciscidae
- Subfamily: Pogonichthyinae
- Genus: Cyprinella
- Species: C. rubripinna

Binomial name
- Cyprinella rubripinna (Garman, 1881)

Synonyms
- Notropis garmani D.S. Jordan, 1885; Cyprinella garmani (D.S. Jordan, 1885)

Species of fish

The gibbous shiner (Cyprinella rubripinna) is a species of freshwater ray-finned fish in the family Leuciscidae, the shiners, daces and minnows. It resides in the states of Durango, Zacatecas and Coahuila within endorheic drainages.
