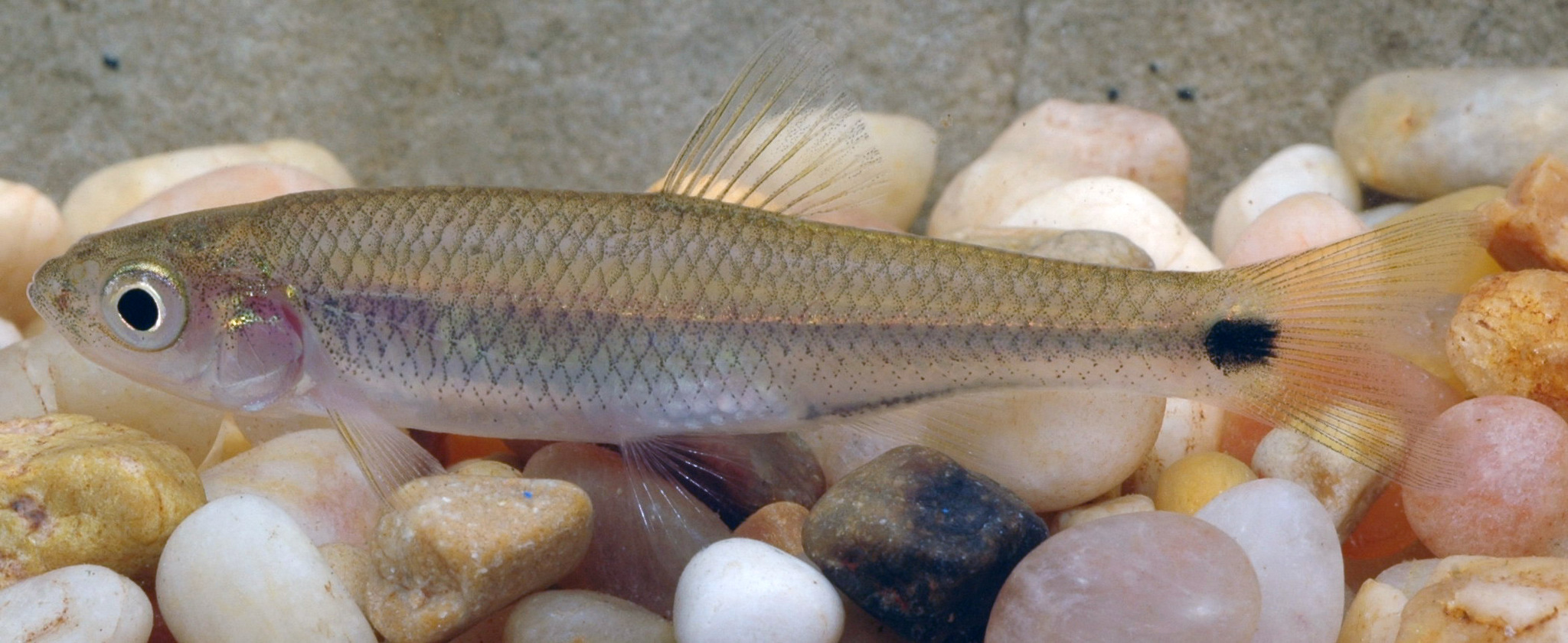

Conservation status
- Least Concern (IUCN 3.1)

Scientific classification
- Kingdom: Animalia
- Phylum: Chordata
- Class: Actinopterygii
- Order: Cypriniformes
- Family: Leuciscidae
- Subfamily: Pogonichthyinae
- Genus: Cyprinella
- Species: C. venusta

Binomial name
- Cyprinella venusta Girard, 1856

Synonyms
- Notropis venustus (Girard 1856); Cyprinella notata Girard, 1856; Cyprinella cercostigma Cope, 1868; Cyprinella calliura D. S. Jordan, 1877; Photogenis eurystomus D. S. Jordan, 1877; Photogenis leucopus D. S. Jordan & Brayton, 1878; Luxilus chickasavensis O. P. Hay, 1881; Cliola urostigma D. S. Jordan & Meek, 1884; Notropis cooglei Hildebrand, & Towers, 1928

= Blacktail shiner =

Species of fish

The blacktail shiner (Cyprinella venusta) is a species of freshwater ray-finned fish in the family Leuciscidae, the shiners, daces and minnows. This fish is found in the United States.

== Description and anatomy ==
The blacktail shiner is a somewhat slender minnow with 8–9 rays on the anal fin, and a prominent black spot at the base of the caudal fin (tail fin). The back is usually yellowish-olive, and the sides are silvery with hints of blue. Adults usually reach 4 inches (100 mm) in length. The blacktail shiner has a large, black caudal spot which distinguishes it from most other minnows. The caudal spot of the blacktail shiner may be faint, especially in populations inhabiting turbid waters, and they could likely be confused with the red shiner (C. lutrensis); however, the red shiner has 9 anal rays (versus 8) and usually 35 or fewer lateral scales (versus 36 or more).

== Geographic distribution ==
The blacktail shiner occurs in Gulf of Mexico drainages from Suwannee River, Georgia and Florida, to Rio Grande, Texas; Mississippi River basin (mostly on Former Mississippi Embayment) from southern Illinois to Louisiana and west in Red River drainage to western Oklahoma.

Blacktail shiners are found in the southern United States west of the Appalachian Mountains. The species ranges east and west from north central Florida to West Texas, and north to southern Illinois. In Texas, blacktail shiners are unknown in the Panhandle, being found primarily from the Edwards Plateau eastward.

The blacktail shiner has also been found from the Rio Grande basin in Texas, east to the Suwannee River, and north through the Mississippi River basin to the confluence of the Ohio River. Two of the three recognized subspecies occur in Alabama. The slender blacktail shiner, C. v. stigmaturus, is found in the upper Mobile River basin (most frequently above the Fall Line), while the eastern blacktail shiner, C. v. cercositgma, occurs in the lower Mobile River basin and coastal rivers draining the state. Intergradations between these subspecies have been recognized in the Alabama, Cahaba, and Tallapoosa river systems.

== Ecology and habitat ==
The blacktail shiner feeds primarily on invertebrates. Its diet includes algae, seeds, and aquatic and terrestrial insects. Aquatic insects and algae were the most common food items of blacktail shiners in the Blanco River, Texas; sediment and detritus were found in 21% of the 36 guts examined. Blacktail shiners feed primarily during the day. Blacktail shiners may serve as major food resource for piscivorous spotted bass (Micropterus punctulatus) during the summer in Village Creek (Neches River), Texas.

The blacktail shiner is most common in pools and runs of clear, sandy-bottomed, small to medium rivers, typically in areas with sparse vegetation and strong current, but upland populations occur in creeks over substrates with more gravel and rubble. Populations in the western part of the species' range are often found in turbid water. Blacktail shiner mesohabitat is ubiquitously distributed among pools, runs, and riffles with silt, gravel, and bedrock substrates. In the Blanco River, Texas, blacktail shiners were most abundant in swift runs in the spring and summer. The species occurred throughout the year in riffle and sandbank habitats in Village Creek (Neches River), Texas. During summer, most individuals were collected from sandbank habitats; they were also found in deep channel and riffle habitats, though no blacktail shiners longer than 47 millimeters (1.9 in) occurred in riffles. Individuals smaller than 17 millimeters (0.67 in) were found predominately in riffle habitats during fall and winter. Juveniles occurred almost exclusively in sandbank mesohabitat during spring. Blacktail shiners are commonly found in sandy or rocky areas of Lake Texoma (Oklahoma/Texas), generally in clearer water of the downstream area; they are occasionally abundant in the tailwaters, and rarely found in the headwaters.

The blacktail shiner hybridizes with the red shiner (C. lutrensis) in Texas and in Illinois.

== Life history ==
The lifespan of the blacktail shiner is up to 4 years in the Leaf River system, Mississippi and up to 5 years in the Blanco River, Texas.

In Texas, the blacktail shiner spawning season is April through September. In Mississippi, it is late March through early October, with most females reproductive from April to early September. In Village Creek, Texas, blacktail shiners revealed size distribution patterns consistent with a protracted spawning season.

Prime spawning habitat for the blacktail shiner is in fractional crevices; generally located in flowing water, preferring crevices in current velocities of 0.30 meters per second (0.98 ft/s). Populations in reservoirs chose crevice sites in locations of much lower current speeds. In the Blanco River, Texas, blacktail shiners were observed depositing eggs underneath small boulders and large cobble in a bedrock riffle in the swiftest current velocities available. Males respond to sounds produced by spawning females and are able to distinguish these sounds from those produced by related female red shiners. Males are territorial, defending a crevice from other males. Breeding pair swims along the crevice, the female deposits eggs; usually the sperm has already been released into the crevice, so the eggs are deposited into a crevice with viable sperm. Immediately after spawning, the male doubles back and eats any eggs that failed to make it into the crevice. Small males (sneakers) try to fertilize eggs by darting between the dominant male and spawning female. Both large and small males will enter another male's territory and deposit sperm in a crevice before the male courts a female to lay eggs in the crevice.

One study in the Blanco River, Texas found that female blacktail shiners had up to 340 ova. Another study in southwestern Mississippi found that clutch sizes ranged between 139 and 459 ova in females 48.6–72.0 millimeters (1.91–2.83 in); average mature ovum diameter was 1.15 millimeters (0.045 in); ovaries in mature females constituted 5.8-19.1% of the somatic body weight. Females from the Pearl River, Mississippi, spawned 20–46 clutches during the reproductive season. The size of sexual maturation is between 32 millimeters (1.3 in) and 42 millimeters (1.7 in).

In the Leaf River system, Mississippi, average length was 24 millimeters (0.94 in) for age 1, 46 millimeters (1.8 in) for age 2, and 72 millimeters (2.8 in) for age 3; populations consisted mainly of age classes 0 and I In the first year, blacktail shiners reach about 45 to 60 millimeters (1.8 to 2.4 in). Average length was 45 millimeters (1.8 in) for age 0, 66 millimeters (2.6 in) for age 1, 90 millimeters (3.5 in) for age 3 and older in the Blanco River, Texas.

== Management ==
The blacktail shiner is of relatively low conservation concern. Their populations are stable, but some issues of concern include habitat changes associated with flood control projects, siltation from development sites, deterioration of water quality, and recent water drawdown for mining and irrigation. Activities such as construction and operation of hydroelectric facilities, flood control, additional irrigation diversions, bank stabilization, oil and gas drilling, mining, grazing, stocking or introduction of nonnative fishes may jeopardize the continued existence of the blacktail shiner. Another potential impact on the population could be hybridization.
