= Papaloapan chub =

Conservation status
- Data Deficient (IUCN 3.1)

Scientific classification
- Kingdom: Animalia
- Phylum: Chordata
- Class: Actinopterygii
- Order: Cypriniformes
- Family: Leuciscidae
- Subfamily: Pogonichthyinae
- Genus: Graodus
- Species: G. moralesi

Binomial name
- Graodus moralesi (F. de Buen, 1955)

Synonyms
- Notropis moralesi F. de Buen, 1955

Species of fish

The Papaloapan chub (Graodus moralesi) is a species of freshwater ray-finned fish belonging to the family Leuciscidae, the shiners, daces and minnows. It is found only in Mexico, and bears a Spanish name "Sardinita de Tepelmene".
