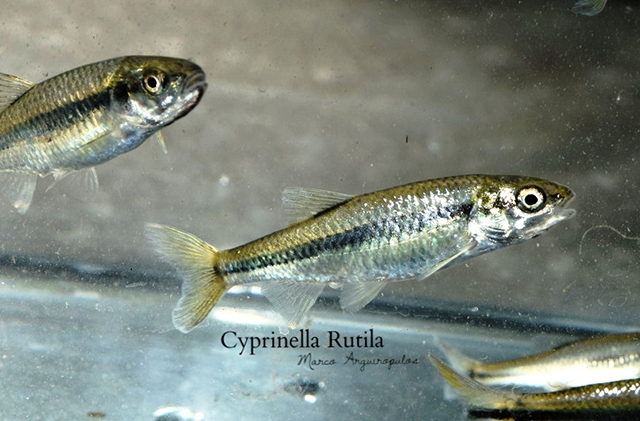

Conservation status
- Data Deficient (IUCN 3.1)

Scientific classification
- Kingdom: Animalia
- Phylum: Chordata
- Class: Actinopterygii
- Order: Cypriniformes
- Family: Leuciscidae
- Subfamily: Pogonichthyinae
- Genus: Cyprinella
- Species: C. rutila

Binomial name
- Cyprinella rutila Girard, 1856

Synonyms
- Moniana rutila Girard, 1856; Notropis rutilus (Girard, 1856); Moniana gracilis Girard, 1856; Cliola montiregis Cope, 1885

= Mexican red shiner =

Species of fish

The Mexican red shiner (Cyprinella rutila) is a species of freshwater ray-finned fish in the family Leuciscidae, the shiners, daces and minnows. It is endemic to Mexico.
