= Bluestripe shiner =

Conservation status
- Near Threatened (IUCN 3.1)

Scientific classification
- Kingdom: Animalia
- Phylum: Chordata
- Class: Actinopterygii
- Order: Cypriniformes
- Family: Leuciscidae
- Genus: Cyprinella
- Species: C. callitaenia

Binomial name
- Cyprinella callitaenia (R. M. Bailey & Gibbs, 1956)

Synonyms
- Notropis callitaenia Bailey & Gibbs, 1956

Species of fish

The bluestripe shiner (Cyprinella callitaenia) is a species of freshwater ray-finned fish in the family Leuciscidae, the shiners, daces and minnows. It is found only in the United States where it is found in the Apalachicola River drainage in Florida, Alabama, and Georgia.
