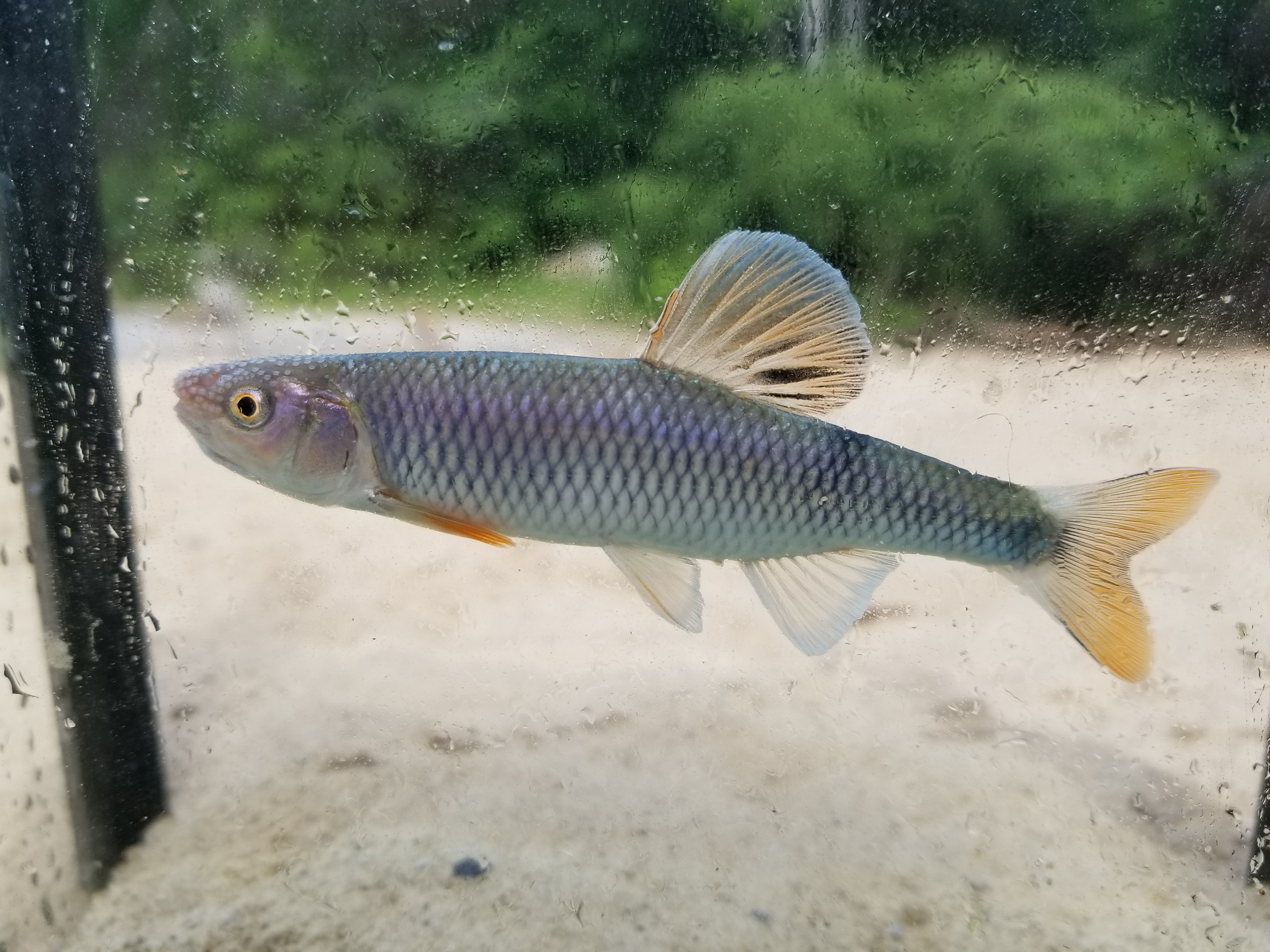

Conservation status
- Least Concern (IUCN 3.1)

Scientific classification
- Kingdom: Animalia
- Phylum: Chordata
- Class: Actinopterygii
- Order: Cypriniformes
- Family: Leuciscidae
- Subfamily: Pogonichthyinae
- Genus: Cyprinella
- Species: C. galactura

Binomial name
- Cyprinella galactura (Cope, 1868)

Synonyms
- Hypsilepis galacturus Cope, 1868; Notropis galacturus (Cope, 1868)

= Whitetail shiner =

Species of fish

The whitetail shiner (Cyprinella galactura) is a species of freshwater ray-finned fish in the family Leuciscidae, the shiners, daces and minnows. It inhabits the Tennessee and Cumberland river drainages of Alabama, Mississippi, Georgia, North Carolina, Tennessee, Virginia, and Kentucky, Atlantic slope headwaters (upper Savannah and Santee river systems, North Carolina, South Carolina, and Georgia), the upper New River drainage in West Virginia and Virginia, and the Ozark Plateau and Ouachita Mountains portions of the White and St. Francis river systems in Missouri and Arkansas.
