= Graodus imeldae =

Conservation status
- Data Deficient (IUCN 3.1)

Scientific classification
- Kingdom: Animalia
- Phylum: Chordata
- Class: Actinopterygii
- Order: Cypriniformes
- Family: Leuciscidae
- Genus: Graodus
- Species: G. imeldae

Binomial name
- Graodus imeldae (Cortés, 1968)

Synonyms
- Notropis imeldae Cortés, 1968

Species of fish

Graodus imeldae, the sardinita de Rio Verde, is a species of freshwater ray-finned fish belonging to the family Leuciscidae, the shiners, daces and minnows. It is found only in Mexico.
