= Bandfin shiner =

Conservation status
- Least Concern (IUCN 3.1)

Scientific classification
- Kingdom: Animalia
- Phylum: Chordata
- Class: Actinopterygii
- Order: Cypriniformes
- Family: Leuciscidae
- Genus: Coccotis
- Species: C. zonistius

Binomial name
- Coccotis zonistius (Jordan, 1880)

Synonyms
- Luxilus zonistius D. S. Jordan, 1880; Notropis zonistius (D. S. Jordan, 1880)

Species of fish

The bandfin shiner (Coccotis zonistius) is a species of freshwater ray-finned fish in the family Leuciscidae, the shiners, daces and minnows. It occurs in tributaries of the Apalachicola River drainage in Georgia, Alabama and Florida, adjacent tributaries of Savannah, Altamaha, and Coosa rivers in Georgia, and the Tallapoosa River in Georgia and Alabama. Its preferred habitat is rocky and sandy pools and runs of headwaters, creeks and small rivers.
