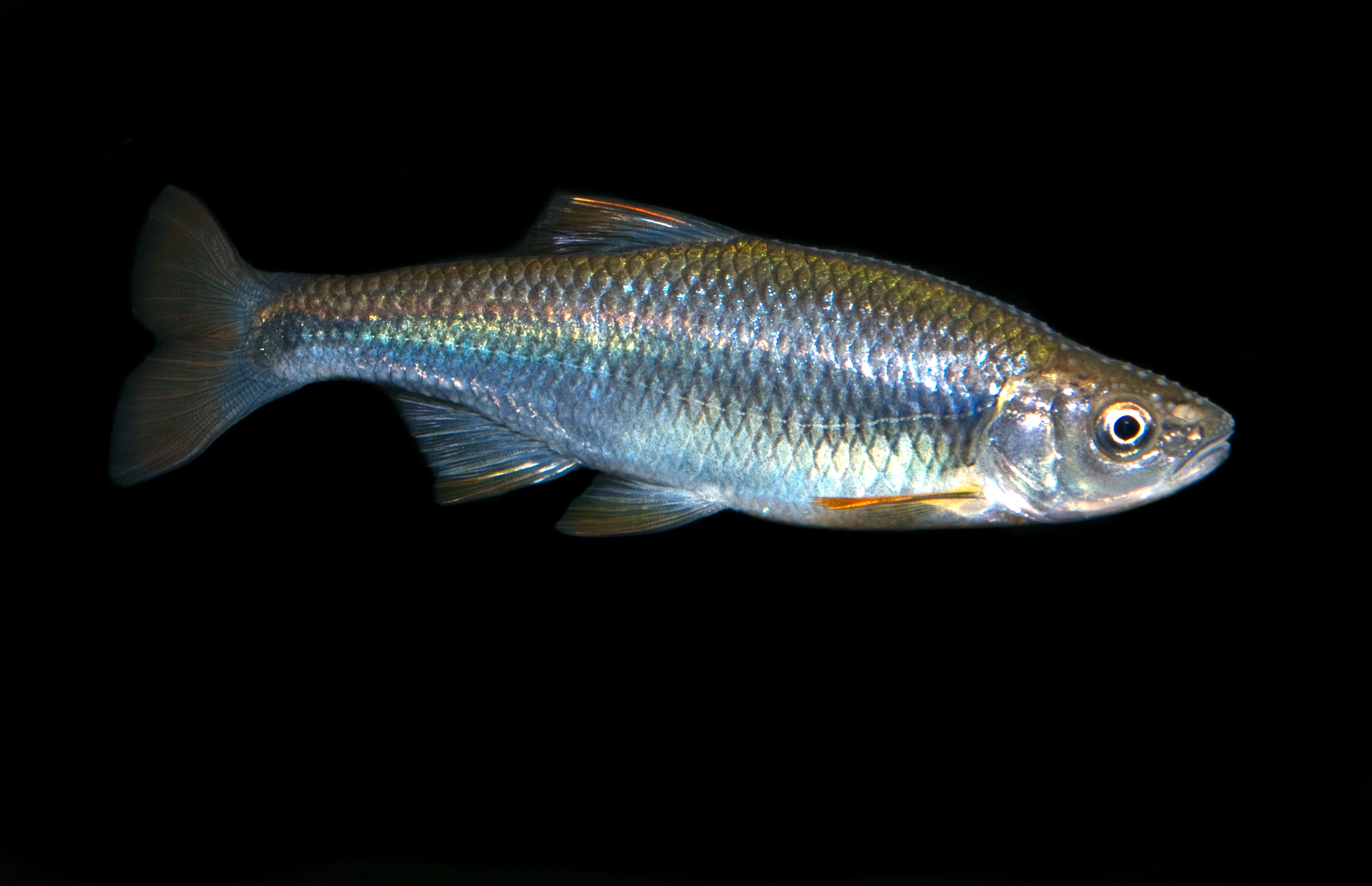

Conservation status
- Least Concern (IUCN 3.1)

Scientific classification
- Kingdom: Animalia
- Phylum: Chordata
- Class: Actinopterygii
- Order: Cypriniformes
- Family: Leuciscidae
- Subfamily: Pogonichthyinae
- Genus: Cyprinella
- Species: C. trichroistia

Binomial name
- Cyprinella trichroistia (D. S. Jordan & Gilbert, 1878)

Synonyms
- Codoma trichroistia D. S. Jordan & Gilbert, 1878; Notropis trichroistia (D. S. Jordan & Gilbert, 1878)

= Tricolor shiner =

Species of fish

The tricolor shiner (Cyprinella trichroistia) is a species of freshwater ray-finned fish in the family Leuciscidae, the shiners, daces and minnows. This fish is endemic to the United States where it occurs in the Alabama River drainage in Alabama, northwestern Georgia, and southeastern Tennessee.
