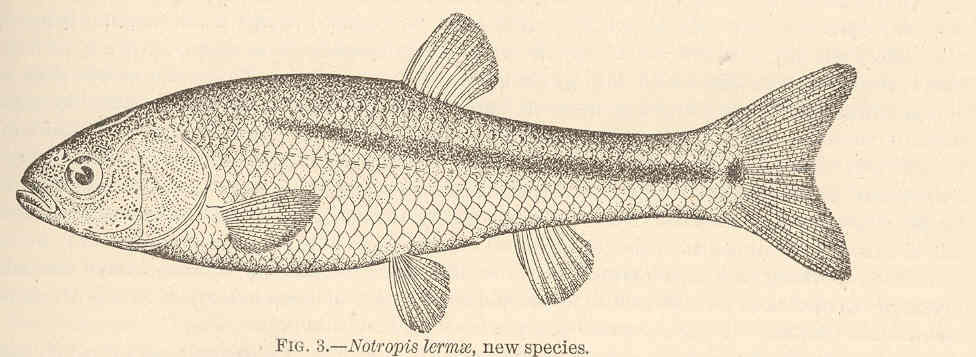

Conservation status
- Least Concern (IUCN 3.1)

Scientific classification
- Kingdom: Animalia
- Phylum: Chordata
- Class: Actinopterygii
- Order: Cypriniformes
- Family: Leuciscidae
- Subfamily: Pogonichthyinae
- Genus: Aztecula; D. S. Jordan & Evermann, 1898
- Species: A. sallaei

Binomial name
- Aztecula sallaei (Günther, 1868)

Synonyms
- Ceratichthys sallaei Günther, 1868; Notropis sallaei (Günther, 1868); Codoma vittata Girard, 1856; Notropis aztecus Woolman [A. J.] 1894; Notropis lermae Evermann & Goldsborough, 1902; Aztecula mexicana Meek, 1902

= Aztec chub =

Species of fish

The Aztec chub or Aztec shiner, (Aztecula sallaei) is a species of freshwater ray-finned fish in the family Leuciscidae, the shiners, daces and minnows. This species is endemic to Mexico. It is the only species in the genus Aztecula.
