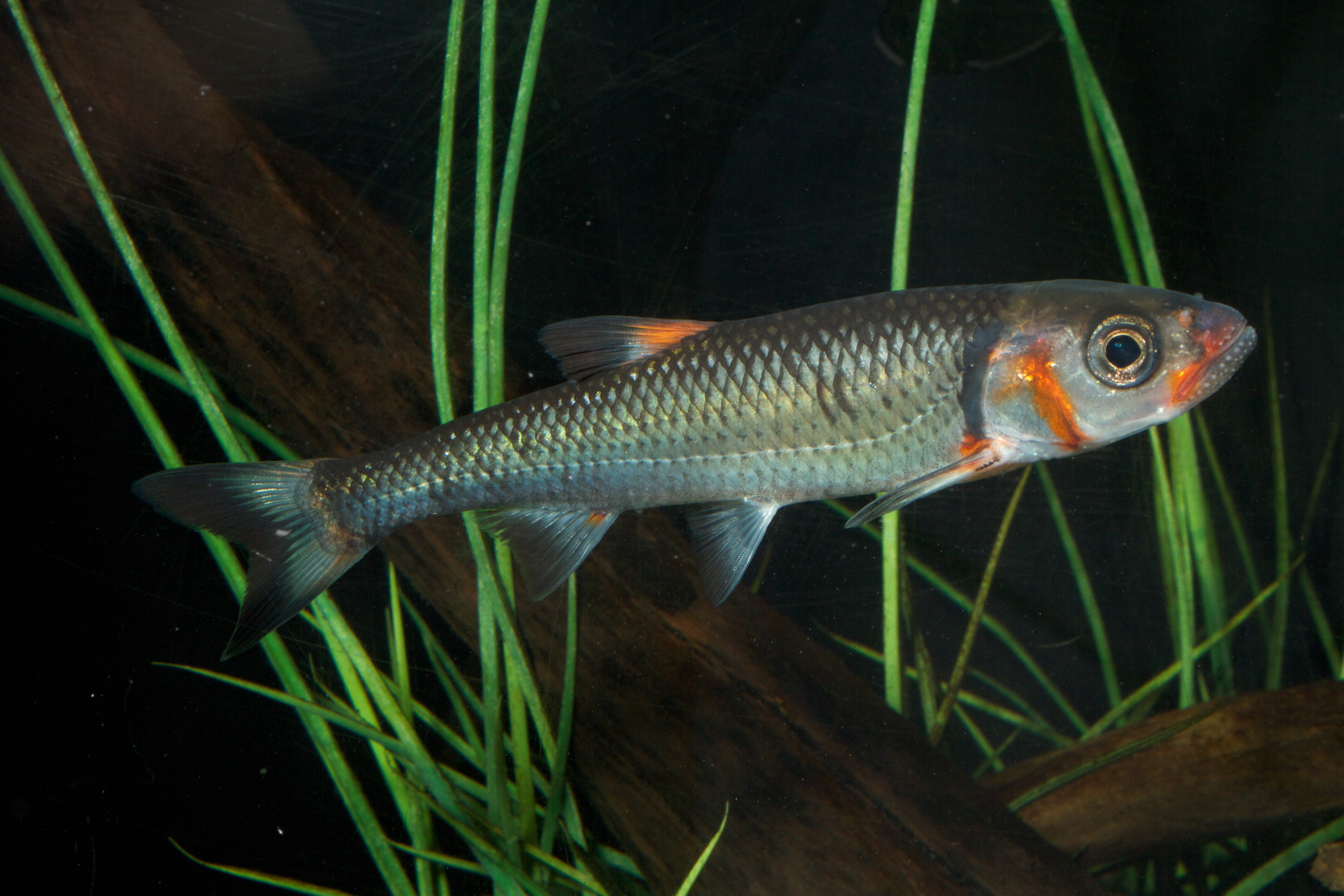
- Warpaint shiner (Coccotis coccogenis)

Scientific classification
- Kingdom: Animalia
- Phylum: Chordata
- Class: Actinopterygii
- Order: Cypriniformes
- Family: Leuciscidae
- Subfamily: Pogonichthyinae
- Genus: Coccotis; D. S. Jordan, 1882

Type species
- Hypsilepis coccogenis Cope, 1868

= Coccotis =

Genus of fish

Coccotis is a genus of freshwater ray-finned fish in the family Leuciscidae, the shiners, daces and minnows. The fishes in this genus are found in North America.

== Species ==
Coccotis contains the following valid species:

- Coccotis coccogenis (Cope, 1868) (Warpaint shiner)
- Coccotis zonistius (D. S. Jordan, 1880) (Bandfin shiner)
