= Whitefin shiner =

Conservation status
- Least Concern (IUCN 3.1)

Scientific classification
- Kingdom: Animalia
- Phylum: Chordata
- Class: Actinopterygii
- Order: Cypriniformes
- Family: Leuciscidae
- Subfamily: Pogonichthyinae
- Genus: Cyprinella
- Species: C. nivea

Binomial name
- Cyprinella nivea (Cope, 1870)

Synonyms
- Hybopsis niveus Cope, 1870; Notropis niveus (Cope, 1870)

Species of fish

The whitefin shiner (Cyprinella nivea) is a species of freshwater ray-finned fish in the family Leuciscidae, the shiners, daces and minnows. It is endemic to the United States, where it occurs on the Atlantic Slope from the Neuse River drainage in North Carolina to the Savannah River drainage in Georgia.
