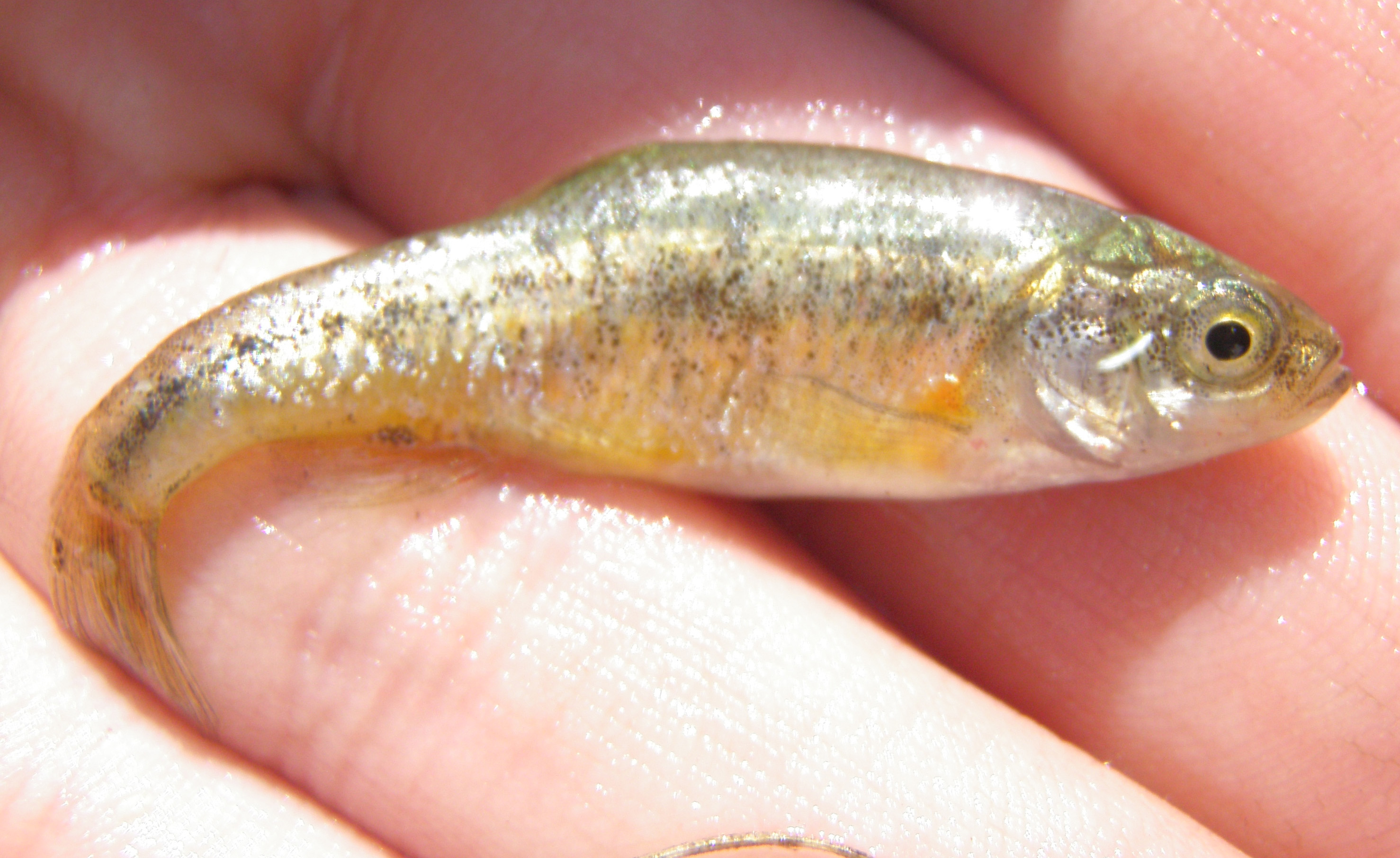

Conservation status
- Endangered (IUCN 3.1)

- Imperiled (NatureServe)

Scientific classification
- Kingdom: Animalia
- Phylum: Chordata
- Class: Actinopterygii
- Order: Cypriniformes
- Family: Leuciscidae
- Subfamily: Pogonichthyinae
- Genus: Iotichthys; D. S. Jordan & Evermann, 1896
- Species: I. phlegethontis

Binomial name
- Iotichthys phlegethontis (Cope, 1874)

Synonyms
- Clinostomus phlegethontis Cope, 1874

= Least chub =

Species of fish

The least chub (Iotichthys phlegethontis) is a species of freshwater ray-finned fish belonging to the family Leuciscidae, the shiners, daces and minnows. It is the only member of the monospecific genus Iotichthys. This species is found only in Utah and more recently in Idaho in the United States. Due to habitat degradation and introduction of non-native fishes, it is currently limited to a few spring complexes in Utah and the Snake River Valley in Idaho.

== Species description ==
The least chub is a small fish, with a maximum size of less than 2.5 inches (64 mm). They have an olive-green black with steel blue upper sides and a golden stripe running from the upper end of the gill opening to the base of the caudal fin. Its lower sides and belly are golden, and they have yellowish fins. While breeding, males develop a reddish hue on their belly and lower sides. The mouth is very oblique, extending to the front of the eye, which is large, and the species lack barbels. The dorsal fin contains 8-9 rays, with its origin just behind the pelvic fin insertion, and the caudal fin is slightly forked. There are 34-38 scales in the lateral series, and the lateral line is either absent or only features 1-3 pored scales. It is the smallest of seven chubs native to Utah. Least chub eat primarily algae and small invertebrates, including mosquito larvae.

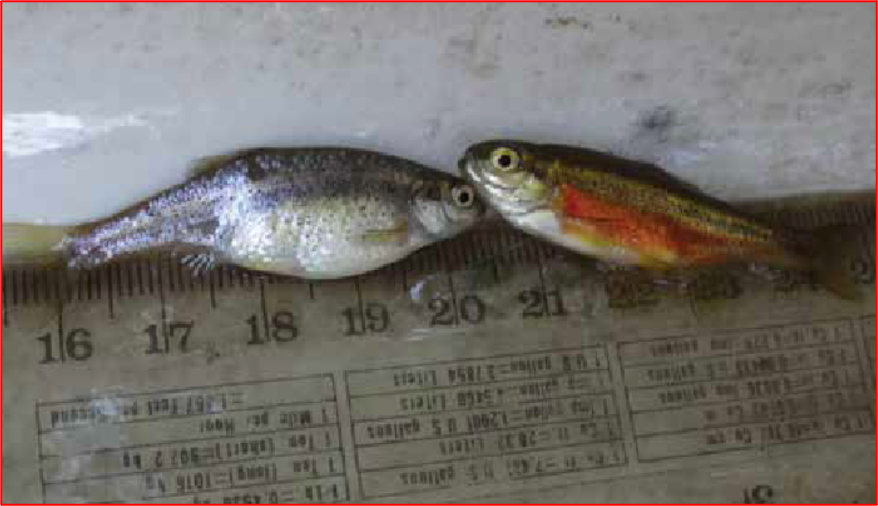
Adult female (left) and a male in spawning colors (right).

== Distribution ==
Least chub are small bodied fish that occupy still or slow-moving water bodies that have few predators. They are endemic to the Bonneville Basin of Utah. Historically, their range included Utah Lake, Provo River, Sevier River, streams, freshwater ponds, springs, and swamps near the Great Salt Lake. Least chub populations have declined in the 20th century due to the impacts of introduced non-native fishes. These introduced fishes became established and competed better due to being better adapted to the environmental conditions. One of the most significant impact that contributed to the decline of least chub was caused by the Western Mosquitofish (Gambusia affinis). These fish are commonly known to be aggressive and predate on eggs and young of other fish. Consequently, they were found in 9 isolated spring pools in the desert regions of Utah.

In 2021, new populations of least chub were documented in Idaho's Snake River drainage, suggesting the species' potential range could be larger than previously thought.

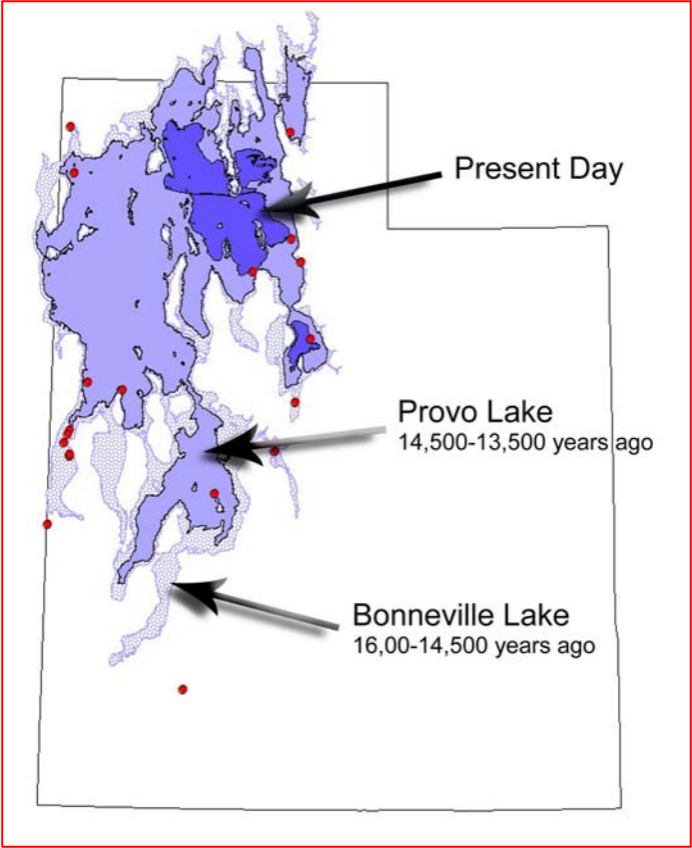
Least Chub Distribution (Bailey, C. L. et al., 2005) [14]

== Biology ==
Given that least chub typically inhabit slow-moving waters, their burst and sustained swimming speeds are relatively low. However, these speeds tend to improve as the fish grow larger. These fish usually spawn in seasonally flooded areas or the shallow edges of springs and ponds, mainly during the spring season. These habitats serve as crucial nursery areas for their eggs and newly hatched larvae. For the rest of the year, adults tend to prefer the deeper pools of springs and ponds. Data from 2012-2014 showed that groundwater levels are essential for the habitat and breeding of the least chub in the Leland Harris Spring Complex. When groundwater levels drop, surface water decreases, resulting in less available habitat space, eventually breaking up populations. In 2013, a significant drop in groundwater caused most of the surface water to disappear, leaving fewer places for fish to live and breed. During wet periods, large ponds form where the least chub can spawn and grow, but during dry periods, the fish move to deeper springs to survive.

== Reproduction ==
Least chub spawn in the spring when the water temperatures reach 16 °C (61 °F). They are polyandrous broadcast spawners, releasing their eggs over vegetation, mainly algae. They do not construct nests or provide any parental care for their young. The fertilized eggs hatch in about two days at a water temperature of 22 °C (72 °F). Submerged vegetation provides essential oxygen and food for eggs and larvae. Least chub is an intermittent spawner, with females releasing a small number of eggs over extended periods, ranging from 300 to 2,700 eggs at a time. The breeding season typically lasts from April to August, with peak activity in May, though it can extend longer depending on environmental conditions. Rather than temperature increases, spawning is triggered by changes in light. Least chub reproduce in marshes when water temperature, alkalinity, pH, and conductivity are highest. After the breeding season, they return to the springs. These reproductive adaptations, including extended spawning periods and tolerance to fluctuating water conditions, allow the least chub to thrive in the variable environments of spring and marsh complexes.

== Conservation status ==
The least chub populations suffered a steep decline in the 1940s and 50s, though the decline wasn't noticed until the 70s. Reasons for the decline include habitat destruction from cattle grazing on and trampling streamside vegetation, water diversion, mineral and energy development, and non-native fishes. Studies indicate that where non-native fishes such as mosquitofish are introduced, few if any least chub remain.

Though the distribution of the least chub is still limited, the Utah Division of Wildlife Resources and other conservation groups have reintroduced the fish into suitable habitats, often removing non-native fish prior to stocking. Other conservation efforts include working with ranchers to fence off critical spring complexes to prevent habitat destruction from cattle grazing.

Recently the Utah Division of Wildlife Resources teamed up with mosquito abatement districts in Davis and Salt Lake counties to distribute the fish to 240 backyard ponds to evaluate it as a potential mosquitofish replacement. Researchers will monitor how well the chub compete against the more aggressive mosquitofish in ponds where they are both stocked. Ponds with only the least chub will be monitored to determine whether they can control mosquito larvae as effectively as the mosquitofish or if more chubs will be required to do the same job.

Conservation efforts for the least chub has also included the establishment of introduced populations as a key strategy to protect the species from habitat loss and other threats. Introduced populations have proven to be successful due to the species' ability to adapt to various water quality conditions and rapid reproductive cycles. From 2014 onwards, ten stable populations were established in artificial ponds, providing a buffer against environmental threats such as drought and climate change. These introduced populations were crucial in the U.S. Fish and Wildlife Service's 2014 decision not to list the least chub under the Endangered Species Act, citing that these populations offered sufficient habitat redundancy and genetic diversity to safeguard the species' future. While non-native species like the western mosquitofish pose a continuous threat, habitat restoration efforts, such as removing invasive species and improving breeding grounds, have played a significant role in stabilizing key populations. Conservationists continue to monitor both natural and introduced populations to ensure long-term survival, particularly in the face of climate change and groundwater depletion.
