= Thicklip chub =

Conservation status
- Least Concern (IUCN 3.1)

Scientific classification
- Kingdom: Animalia
- Phylum: Chordata
- Class: Actinopterygii
- Order: Cypriniformes
- Family: Leuciscidae
- Subfamily: Pogonichthyinae
- Genus: Cyprinella
- Species: C. labrosa

Binomial name
- Cyprinella labrosa (Cope, 1870)

Synonyms
- Ceratichthys labrosus Cope, 1870; Hybopsis labrosa (Cope, 1870)

Species of fish

The thicklip chub (Cyprinella labrosa) is a species of freshwater ray-finned fish in the family Leuciscidae, the shiners, daces and minnows. It is endemic to the United States, where it occurs in the Blue Ridge foothill and typical Piedmont sections of the Pee Dee and Santee drainages in North Carolina and South Carolina.
