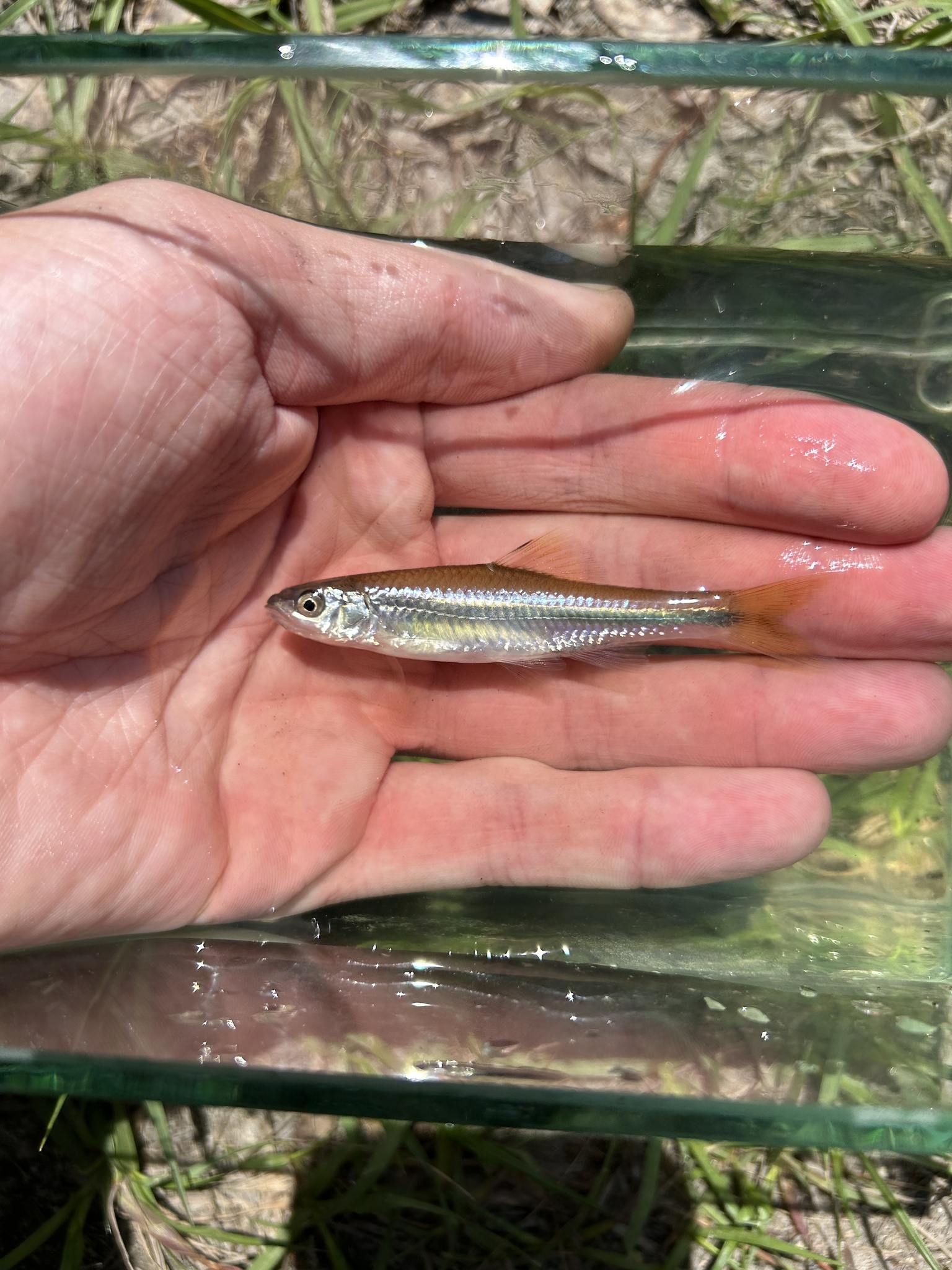

Conservation status
- Least Concern (IUCN 3.1)

Scientific classification
- Kingdom: Animalia
- Phylum: Chordata
- Class: Actinopterygii
- Order: Cypriniformes
- Family: Leuciscidae
- Genus: Cyprinella
- Species: C. leedsi

Binomial name
- Cyprinella leedsi (Fowler, 1942)

Synonyms
- Notropis leedsi Fowler, 1942

= Bannerfin shiner =

Species of fish

The bannerfin shiner (Cyprinella leedsi) is a species of freshwater ray-finned fish in the family Leuciscidae, the shiners, daces and minnows. It is endemic to the United States, where it occurs on the Atlantic Slope from the Edisto River drainage in South Carolina to the Altamaha River drainage in Georgia. It also occurs on the Gulf Slope in the Suwannee and the Oklockonee drainages in southern Georgia and northern Florida.
