= Cyprinella stigmatura =

Scientific classification
- Kingdom: Animalia
- Phylum: Chordata
- Class: Actinopterygii
- Order: Cypriniformes
- Family: Leuciscidae
- Genus: Cyprinella
- Species: C. stigmatura

Binomial name
- Cyprinella stigmatura (Jordan, 1877)

Synonyms
- Photogenis stigmaturus Jordan, 1877

Species of fish

Cyprinella stigmatura is a species of freshwater ray-finned fish in the family Leuciscidae, the shiners, daces and minnows. It is endemic to the United States.
