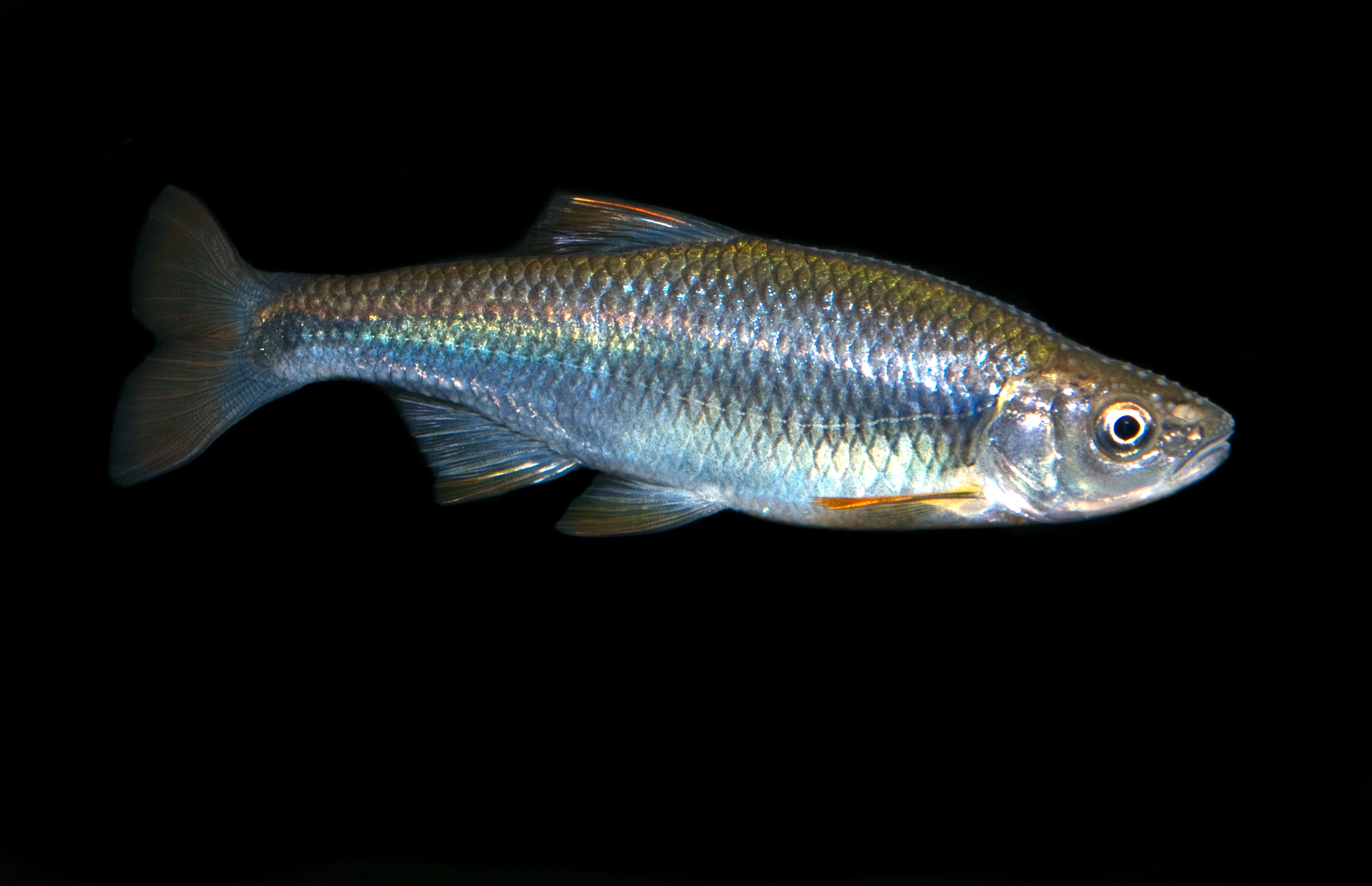
- Tricolor shiner (Cyprinella trichroistia)

Scientific classification
- Kingdom: Animalia
- Phylum: Chordata
- Class: Actinopterygii
- Division: Teleostei
- Order: Cypriniformes
- Family: Leuciscidae
- Subfamily: Pogonichthyinae
- Genus: Cyprinella; Girard, 1856

Type species
- Leuciscus bubalinus Baird & Girard, 1853

Species
- 32 - See text.

Synonyms
- Erogala Jordan, 1878; Moniana Girard, 1856

= Cyprinella =

Genus of fishes

Cyprinella is a genus of freshwater ray-finned fish in the family Leuciscidae, the shiners, daces and minnows. They are known as the satinfin shiners. They are native to North America, and some are among the most common freshwater fish species on the eastern side of the continent. Conversely, several Cyprinella species with small distributions are threatened and the Maravillas Creek subspecies of the red shiner (Cyprinella lutrensis blairi) is extinct.

The largest species reach around 19 cm (7.5 in) in total length. Breeding males often develop bright coloration. Fish of the genus produce audible sounds during courtship and conflict.

== Species ==
These are the currently recognized species in this genus:

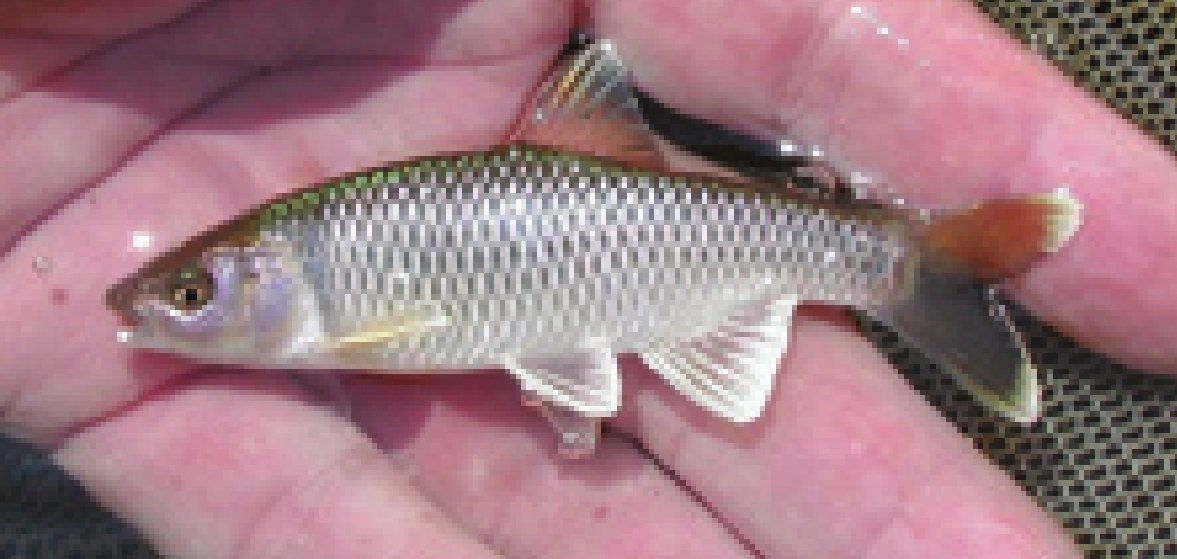
Satinfin shiner (Cyprinella analostana)

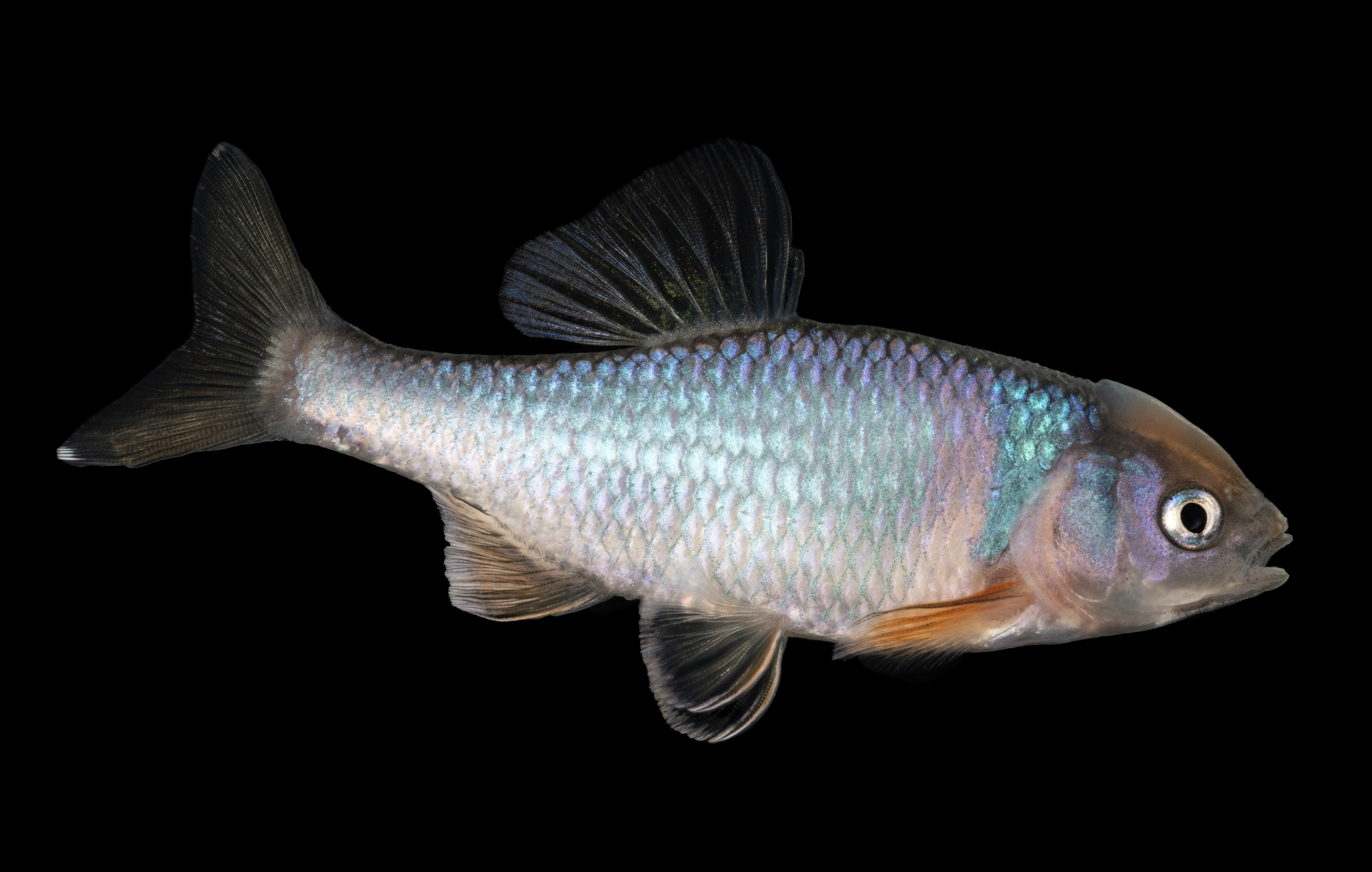
Red shiner (Cyprinella lutrensis)

- Cyprinella alvarezdelvillari Contreras-Balderas & Lozano-Vilano, 1994 (Tepehuan shiner)
- Cyprinella analostana Girard, 1859 (Satinfin shiner)
- Cyprinella bocagrande (Chernoff & R. R. Miller, 1982) (Largemouth shiner)
- Cyprinella caerulea (D. S. Jordan, 1877) (Blue shiner)
- Cyprinella callisema (D. S. Jordan, 1877) (Ocmulgee shiner)
- Cyprinella callistia (D. S. Jordan, 1877) (Alabama shiner)
- Cyprinella callitaenia (R. M. Bailey & Gibbs, 1956) (Bluestripe shiner)
- Cyprinella camura (D. S. Jordan & Meek, 1884) (Bluntface shiner)
- Cyprinella chloristia (D. S. Jordan and Brayton, 1878) (Greenfin shiner)
- Cyprinella eurystoma (D. S. Jordan, 1877)
- Cyprinella formosa (Girard, 1856) (Beautiful shiner)
- Cyprinella galactura (Cope, 1868) (Whitetail shiner)
- Cyprinella gibbsi (Howell & J. D. Williams, 1971) (Tallapoosa shiner)
- Cyprinella labrosa (Cope, 1870) (Thicklip chub)
- Cyprinella leedsi (Fowler, 1942) (Bannerfin shiner)
- Cyprinella lepida Girard, 1856 (Plateau shiner)
- Cyprinella leptocheilus Tracy, Rohde & Jenkins, 2024 (Siouan thinlip chub)
- Cyprinella lutrensis (Baird & Girard, 1853) (Red shiner)
- Cyprinella nivea (Cope, 1870) (Whitefin shiner)
- Cyprinella panarcys (C. L. Hubbs & R. R. Miller, 1978) (Conchos shiner)
- Cyprinella proserpina (Girard, 1856) (Proserpine shiner)
- Cyprinella pyrrhomelas (Cope, 1870) (Fieryblack shiner)
- Cyprinella rubripinna Garman, 1881 (Gibbous shiner)
- Cyprinella rutila (Girard, 1856) (Mexican red shiner)
- Cyprinella spiloptera (Cope, 1867) (Spotfin shiner)
- Cyprinella stigmatura (D. S. Jordan, 1877)
- Cyprinella trichroistia (D. S. Jordan & Gilbert, 1878) (Tricolor shiner)
- Cyprinella venusta Girard, 1856 (Blacktail shiner)
- Cyprinella whipplei Girard, 1856 (Steelcolor shiner)
- Cyprinella xaenura (D. S. Jordan, 1877) (Altamaha shiner)
- Cyprinella xanthicara (W. L. Minckley & Lytle, 1969) (Cuatro Cienegas shiner)
- Cyprinella zanema (D. S. Jordan & Brayton, 1878) (Santee chub)
