= Stumptooth minnow =

Conservation status
- Extinct (1930) (IUCN 3.1)

Scientific classification
- Kingdom: Animalia
- Phylum: Chordata
- Class: Actinopterygii
- Order: Cypriniformes
- Family: Leuciscidae
- Subfamily: Pogonichthyinae
- Genus: †Stypodon; Garman, 1881
- Species: †S. signifer

Binomial name
- †Stypodon signifer Garman, 1881

Extinct species of fish

The stumptooth minnow (Stypodon signifer) is an extinct species of freshwater ray-finned fish belonging to the family Leuciscidae, the shiners, daces and minnows. This species was endemic to Mexico, being found only in the Valle de Parras in the Chihuahuan Desert in Coahuila state. It is thought to have become extinct around 1930.
