= Graodus =

Scientific classification
- Domain: Eukaryota
- Kingdom: Animalia
- Phylum: Chordata
- Class: Actinopterygii
- Order: Cypriniformes
- Family: Leuciscidae
- Subfamily: Pogonichthyinae
- Genus: Graodus; Günther, 1868

Type species
- Graodus nigrotaeniatus Günther, 1868

Genus of fish

Graodus is a genus of freshwater ray-finned fishes belonging to the family Leuciscidae, the shiners, daces and minnows. The fishes in this genus are endemic to Mexico.

== Species ==
Graodus contains the following species:

- Graodus boucardi (Günther, 1868) (Balsas shiner)
- Graodus cumingii (Günther, 1868) (Atoyac chub)
- Graodus imeldae (M. T. Cortés, 1968) (Rio Verde sardinita)
- Graodus moralesi (de Buen, 1956) (Papaloapan chub)
