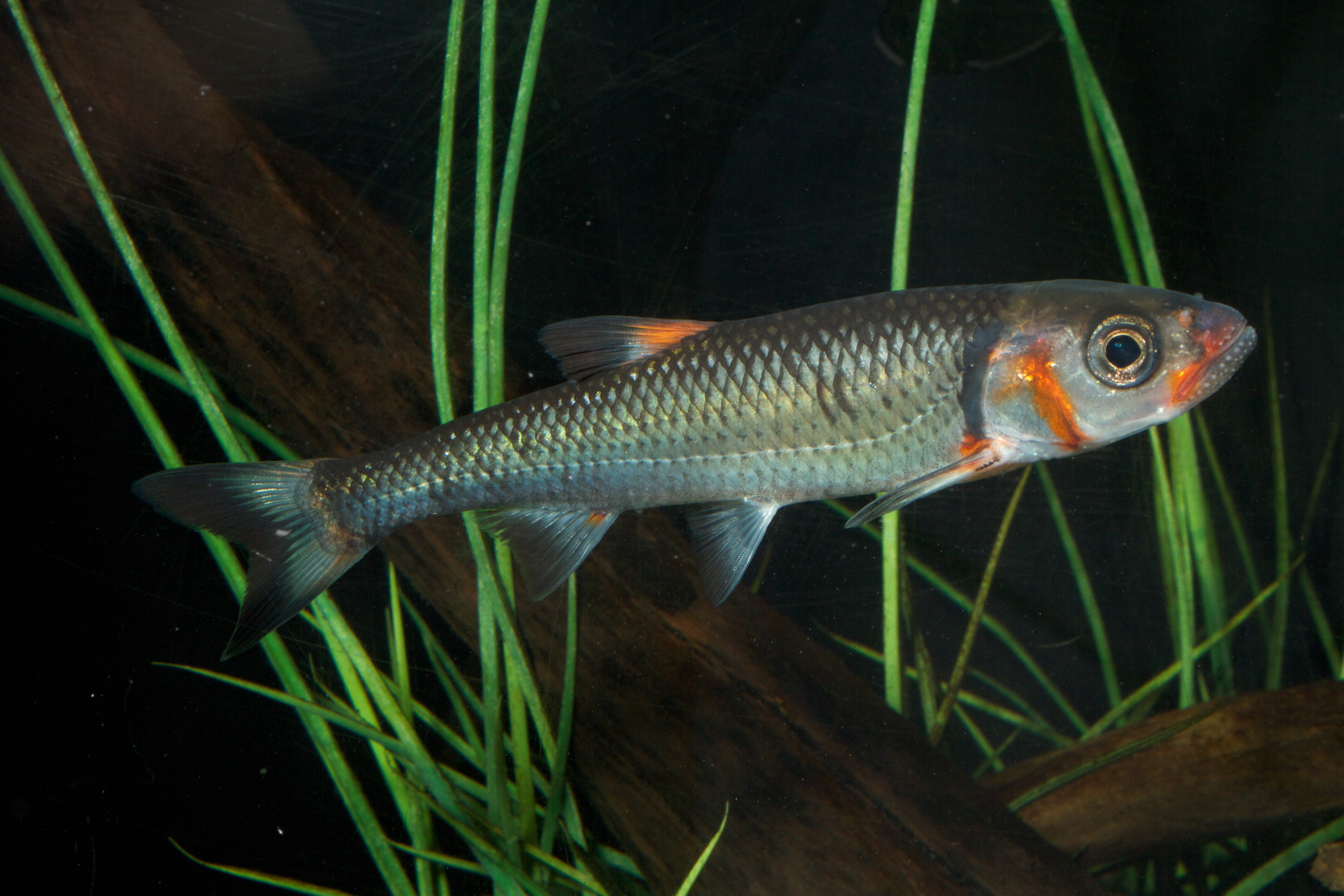

Conservation status
- Least Concern (IUCN 3.1)

Scientific classification
- Kingdom: Animalia
- Phylum: Chordata
- Class: Actinopterygii
- Order: Cypriniformes
- Family: Leuciscidae
- Subfamily: Pogonichthyinae
- Genus: Coccotis
- Species: C. coccogenis

Binomial name
- Coccotis coccogenis (Cope, 1868)

Synonyms
- Hypsilepis coccogenis Cope, 1868; Notropis coccogenis (Cope, 1868); Luxilus coccogenis (Cope, 1868); Notropis brimleyi Bean, 1903

= Warpaint shiner =

Species of fish

The warpaint shiner (Coccotis coccogenis) is a species of freshwater fish found in North America. It is common in the upper Tennessee River basin as well as in the Savannah River, the Santee River, and the New River in North Carolina. Adults have a mean length of 9 centimetres (3.5 in) and can reach a maximum length of 14 centimetres (5.5 in). The maximum age reported for this species is 4 years.

Warpaint shiners live in cool streams with gravel and rubble beds. They feed on aquatic insect larvae and on terrestrial insects they catch on the water surface. The warpaint shiner provides forage for sport fish such as small and large mouth bass. Importantly the warpaint shiner acts as host to the federally endangered freshwater mussels known as heelsplitters.

== Range and breeding ==
Warpaint shiners were originally found only in the Tennessee River drainage. Due to human activity, the species has been introduced into the Upper Savannah, the Santee, and the New River drainages. Warpaint shiners inhabit moderate to high gradient creeks, streams, and rivers with clear, cool water where they feed on aquatic insects. Their life expectancy is from two to four years during which they grow to between 65 mm and 95 mm in length. The breeding season for warpaint shiners spans from May to June, during which time an individual will produce an average of 750 offspring. Importantly the warpaint shiner acts as host to the federally endangered freshwater mussels known as heelsplitters. Heelsplitter populations have been adversely affected by human activities, such as the construction of dams and the pollution and siltation resulting from large scale agriculture. Heelsplitters have been extirpated from much of their native range. This mussel species depends on the warpaint shiner to act as a host to larval mussels that attach to the fish gills during their maturation. Further information is needed to establish the importance of the warpaint shiner as a species, and how it should be managed and protected.

== Geographic distribution of species ==
The warpaint shiner is indigenous to the Upper Tennessee River drainage, Western Virginia, Western North Carolina, Northern Georgia and Northern Alabama. It may also be found in adjacent tributaries of the Savannah River in North Carolina and South Carolina, the Catawba, Savannah, and Broad River drainages. Warpaint shiners have been introduced (it is suspected due to bait bucket release) in the New River drainage in North Carolina and Virginia, and the Santee drainage in South Carolina. The impact of these introductions is not known. The warpaint shiner is listed as "present and probably introduced" in the Kanawha River drainage, above the falls. The warpaint shiner persists in its historical range although populations have been negatively affected by damming activity, siltation, and pollution in some locations and are currently threatened in Alabama.

== Ecology ==
Adult warpaint shiners are a pelagic freshwater fish found in rubble and gravel riffles and the pools of fast creeks with high clarity. They prefer cool, clear, and small to medium-sized rivers and streams with rocky substrates. The warpaint shiner is an insectivore. During the spring the warpaint shiner uses its large terminal mouth to primarily feed on aquatic insect larva from the order Ephemeroptera, such as mayfly nymphs. During the summer warpaint shiners feed mostly terrestrial insects, taken at the surface belonging to the orders Hymenoptera and Coleoptera. Largemouth bass and smallmouth bass are the two primary predators of the warpaint shiner. Associates of the warpaint shiner include the saffron shiner and the river chub. These small forage fish are often found together in small schools. Warpaint shiners have been observed spawning over the circular nests of the river chub. The warpaint shiner's dependence on clear running water and a rocky substrate to spawn successfully makes it susceptible to the slowing or stopping of rivers and streams by dams and the siltation resulting from river bank destabilization due to farming operations and land development.

== Life history ==
Warpaint shiners reach sexual maturity at two years of age spawning for the first time in their third summer. Spawning occurs in clear running water over the margins of circular rock nests constructed by river chubs and takes place in May and June. Males will hover over the nest in groups of eight to ten with the largest male at the front. Females approach from behind the males and they pair off and settle into a crevice where sperm and eggs are released. Other males will crowd around a spawning pair and attempt to fertilize the eggs. There is no parental care after spawning. Each spawning can result in 300 to 1600 offspring. Warpaint shiners in the wild live to be around four years of age, slightly longer lifespans have been recorded for specimens in captivity.

== Current management ==
Currently there are no active management initiatives specifically for the warpaint shiner. Though the warpaint shiner is considered a "special concern" in parts of Alabama and South Carolina, global populations are considered stable and secure. Habitat destruction resulting from deforestation, loss of riparian cover, siltation and the creation of impoundments pose the greatest risk to the warpaint shiner. The warpaint shiner is not a valued sport or pan fish and the population is relatively stable in most of its range. The management measures necessary to preserve these fish are beneficial not only to the warpaint shiner but to a myriad of stream dwelling fishes. The warpaint shiner also provides important forage for very popular sport fish such as the largemouth bass and smallmouth bass. Additionally, the warpaint shiner is known to be a host for the Tennessee heelsplitter, a federally endangered freshwater mussel. In their larval stage these mussels are parasitic and need to attach to the gills or fins of fish in order to mature into juveniles. Because freshwater mussels are the most endangered category of animals in North America, the protection of the fishes that act as hosts for the mussel larva is essential for the recovery of the species.

== Further references ==
- "Luxilus coccogenis (Cope, 1868)". FishBase.
