= Santee chub =

Conservation status
- Least Concern (IUCN 3.1)

Scientific classification
- Kingdom: Animalia
- Phylum: Chordata
- Class: Actinopterygii
- Order: Cypriniformes
- Family: Leuciscidae
- Subfamily: Pogonichthyinae
- Genus: Cyprinella
- Species: C. zanema

Binomial name
- Cyprinella zanema (D. S. Jordan and Brayton, 1878)

Synonyms
- Ceratichthys zanemus D. S. Jordan & Brayton, 1878; Hybopsis zanema (D. S. Jordan & Brayton, 1878)

Species of fish

The Santee chub (Cyprinella zanema) is a species of freshwater ray-finned fish in the family Leuciscidae, the shiners, daces and minnows. It is endemic to the United States, where it occurs in the Cape Fear, Pee Dee, and upper Santee river drainages in North and South Carolina.
