= Whitefin (yacht) =

- Sailing yacht Whitefin
- Class: Spirit of Tradition
- Sail no: ITA 12736
- Designer(s): Bruce King
- Builder: Renaissance Yachts; Maine, USA
- Launched: 1984
- Owner(s): Joy Charter Srls

Racing career
- Notable victories: Maxi Yacht Rolex Cup 2002; Trofeo Prada 2002; Maxi Yacht Rolex Cup 2003; Trofeo Prada 2004; Maxi Yacht Rolex Cup 2005; Trofeo Panerai 2006; Cannes Régates Royales 2015, TAG Heur Cup 2016.

Specifications
- Type: Sloop 7/8
- Displacement: 54tons
- Length: 28 m (92 ft)
- Beam: 6.3 m (21 ft)
- Draft: 3.5 m (11 ft)
- Mast height: 44 m (144 ft)
- Crew: 5

Notes
- Interiors - Joseph Artese Design; Hull - Wood (West System); Guests - 10; Web site - www.whitefin.it

The Whitefin is a 92-foot sailing super yacht, racing in the "Spirit of Tradition" class.

== Career ==
Whitefin was built between 1983 and 1984 in Camden, Maine, USA, by owner/builder Phil Long who, for the project, used the Renaissance Yacht shipyard he had created a few years before, to build the yacht Whitehawk.

Both boats were designed by Californian designer Bruce King, who, after having established a reputation creating many successful, innovative ocean racing and cruising boats, moved from Newport Harbor, California, to Maine, to work on the Whitehawk project and, later, on the Whitefin project. These, for King, were just the beginning of a series of successful sailing maxi yachts like Signe (1990 - again with Renaissance Yachts), Hetairos (1993), Alejandra (1993), Sophie (1994 - again with Renaissance Yachts), Antonisa (1999), Maria Cattiva (2002) and Scheherazade (2003).

Between 2000 and 2002, approximately twenty years after her launch, Whitefin underwent an eighteen-month refit under her owner, Alfredo Canessa, who had purchased her from Pasquale Natuzzi. The refit updated her technical systems while preserving her original layout both above and below deck.Following the refit, the yacht participated in several regattas in the Spirit of Tradition category, including the Maxi Yacht Rolex Cup in Porto Cervo, Sardinia; the Vele d’Epoca di Imperia and associated events such as the Trofeo Prada and Trofeo Panerai in Imperia, Liguria; and Les Voiles de Saint-Tropez in Saint-Tropez, France.

With the advent of the actual ownership, from December 2014 to April 2015 Whitefin has undergone a deep upgrade preparing her to a new season of regattas.

Whitefin is currently available for luxury charter.

== Honours ==
The yacht's name is bound to the following international trophies: Maxi Yacht Rolex Cup 2002 (2nd classified), Vele d'Epoca di Imperia Trofeo Prada 2002 (1st classified), Maxi Yacht Rolex Cup 2003 (1st classified), Vele d'Epoca di Imperia Trofeo Prada 2004 (1st classified), Maxi Yacht Rolex Cup 2005 (2nd classified), Vele d'Epoca di Imperia Trofeo Panerai 2006 (3rd classified), Cannes Régates Royales 2015 (2nd classified), TAG Heur VELA Cup 2016 and 2017 (1st classified).

== Description ==
Whitefin is built up in the WEST system fashion of multiple plies, six plies each made up of 1-inch thick boards. The innermost ply and the four successive plies are Maine white cedar, while the outermost ply, laid longitudinally, is Port Orford (Oregon) Cedar. From the decagonal skylight and the fireplace in the main salon, to the hot tub in the owner’s suite, every part of this boat recalls the years of the Gilded Era.
