= Maravillas Creek =

- Map
- Etymology: Spanish for wonders, marvels

Location
- Country: United States
- States: Texas
- Counties: Brewster

Physical characteristics
- Source: Del Norte Mountains
  - location: between Alpine and Marathon
  - coordinates: 30°13′56″N 103°28′34″W
- Mouth: Rio Grande
  - location: Black Gap WMA
  - coordinates: 29°33′45″N 102°46′44″W
- Length: 90 miles (140 km)

Basin features
- River system: Rio Grande Basin
- Bridges: US 385

Maravillas Creek is a river in Texas. It is a tributary of the Rio Grande.

== See also ==
- List of rivers of Texas
- List of tributaries of the Rio Grande
