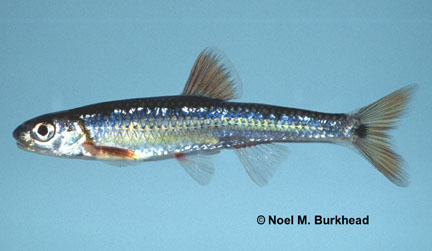
- Notropis spectrunculus

Scientific classification
- Kingdom: Animalia
- Phylum: Chordata
- Class: Actinopterygii
- Order: Cypriniformes
- Family: Leuciscidae
- Subfamily: Pogonichthyinae; Girard, 1858

Genera
- See text

= Pogonichthyinae =

Subfamily of fishes

Pogonichthyinae is a subfamily of the freshwater fish family Leuciscidae, which contains the true minnows. Members of this family are known as American minnows or the North American (NA) clade of minnows. As the name suggests, all members of this family are found in North America (although they are not the only minnows native to North America, as Plagopterinae, Laviniinae, and Leuciscinae are also found there).

== Genera ==
Pogonichthyinae contains the following genera;

- Agosia Girard, 1856 (longfin dace)
- Alburnops Girard, 1856
- Algansea Girard, 1856 (Mexican chubs)
- Aztecula D. S. Jordan & Evermann, 1898 (Aztec chub)
- Campostoma Agassiz, 1855 (stonerollers)
- Clinostomus Girard, 1856 (redside daces)
- Coccotis D. S. Jordan, 1882
- Codoma Girard, 1856 (ornate shiner)
- Cyprinella Girard, 1856 (satinfin shiners)
- Dionda Girard, 1856 (desert minnows)
- Ericymba Cope, 1865 (longjaw minnows)
- Erimonax D. S. Jordan, 1924 (spotfin chub)
- Erimystax D. S. Jordan, 1882 (slender chubs)
- Exoglossum Rafinesque, 1818 (cutlip minnows)
- Graodus Günther, 1868
- Hudsonius Girard, 1856
- Hybognathus Agassiz, 1855 (silvery minnows)
- Hybopsis Agassiz, 1854 (bigeye chubs)
- Hydrophlox D. S. Jordan, 1878
- Iotichthys D. S. Jordan & Evermann, 1896 (least chub)
- Lythrurus D. S. Jordan, 1876 (finescale shiners)
- Luxilus Rafinesque, 1820 (highscale shiners)
- Macrhybopsis Cockerell & Allison 1909 (blacktail chubs)
- Miniellus D. S. Jordan, 1882
- Mylocheilus Agassiz, 1855 (peamouths)
- Nocomis Girard 1856 (hornyhead chubs)
- Notropis Rafinesque, 1818 (eastern shiners)
- Oregonichthys Hubbs, 1929 (Oregon chubs)
- Paranotropis Fowler, 1904
- Phenacobius Cope, 1867 (suckermouth minnows)
- Pimephales Rafinesque, 1820 (bluntnose minnows)
- Platygobio gill, 1863 (flathead chub)
- Pogonichthys Girard, 1854 (splittails)
- Pteronotropis Fowler, 1935 (flagfin shiners)
- Rhinichthys Agassiz, 1849 (riffle daces, loach minnows)
- Richardsonius Girard, 1856 (redside shiners)
- †Stypodon Garman, 1881 (stumptooth minnow)
- Tampichthys Schönhuth, Doadrio, Dominguez-Dominguez, Hillis & Mayden, 2008
- Tiaroga Girard, 1856 (loach minnow)
- Yuriria D. S. Jordan & Evermann, 1896

The former genus Pararhinichthys, containing only the cheat minnow, is now thought to represent an F1 hybrid of Rhinichthys cataractae and Nocomis micropogon.
