= List of fishes of Oklahoma =

There are over 177 species of fish in the US state of Oklahoma, at least 7% of which are not native.

Species include:

- Alabama shad (Alosa alabamae)
- Alligator gar (Atractosteus spatula)
- American eel (Anguilla rostrata)
- American gizzard shad (Dorosoma cepedianum)
- American paddlefish (Polyodon spathula)
- Arkansas darter (Etheostoma cragini)
- Arkansas River shiner (Notropis girardi)
- Banded darter (Etheostoma zonale)
- Banded pygmy sunfish (Elassoma zonatum)
- Banded sculpin (Cottus carolinae)
- Bantam sunfish (Lepomis symmetricus)
- Bigeye chub (Hybopsis amblops)
- Bigeye shiner (Notropis boops)
- Bigmouth buffalo (Ictiobus cyprinellus)
- Black buffalo (Ictiobus niger)
- Black bullhead (Ameiurus melas)
- Black crappie (Pomoxis nigromaculatus)
- Black redhorse (Moxostoma duquesni)
- Blackside darter (Percina maculata)
- Blackspot shiner (Notropis atrocaudalis)
- Blackspotted topminnow (Fundulus olivaceus)
- Blackstripe topminnow (Fundulus notatus)
- Blacktail shiner (Cyprinella venusta)
- Blue catfish (Ictalurus furcatus)
- Blue sucker (Cycleptus elongatus)
- Bluegill (Lepomis macrochirus)
- Bluehead shiner (Pteronotropis hubbsi)
- Bluntface shiner (Cyprinella camura)
- Bluntnose darter (Etheostoma chlorosomum)
- Bluntnose minnow (Pimephales notatus)
- Bowfin (Amia calva)
- Brindled madtom (Noturus miurus)
- Brook silverside (Labidesthes sicculus)
- Brown bullhead (Ameiurus nebulosus)
- Brown trout (Salmo trutta)
- Bullhead minnow (Pimephales vigilax)
- Cardinal shiner (Luxilus cardinalis)
- Carmine shiner (Notropis percobromus)
- Central stoneroller (Campostoma anomalum)
- Chain pickerel (Esox niger)
- Channel catfish (Ictalurus punctatus)
- Channel darter (Percina copelandi)
- Chestnut lamprey (Ichthyomyzon castaneus)
- Chub shiner (Notropis potteri)
- Common carp (Cyprinus carpio)
- Common logperch (Percina caprodes)
- Common shiner (Luxilus cornutus)
- Creek chub (Semotilus atromaculatus)
- Creek chubsucker (Erimyzon oblongus)
- Creole darter (Etheostoma collettei)
- Crystal darter (Crystallaria asprella)
- Cypress darter (Etheostoma proeliare)
- Cypress minnow (Hybognathus hayi)
- Dollar sunfish (Lepomis marginatus)
- Dusky darter (Percina sciera)
- Emerald shiner (Notropis atherinoides)
- Fantail darter (Etheostoma flabellare)
- Fathead minnow (Pimephales promelas)
- Flathead catfish (Pylodictis olivaris)
- Flathead chub (Platygobio gracilis)
- Flathead mullet (Mugil cephalus)
- Flier (Centrarchus macropterus)
- Freckled madtom (Noturus nocturnus)
- Freshwater drum (Aplodinotus grunniens)
- Ghost shiner (Notropis buchanani)
- Golden redhorse (Moxostoma erythrurum)
- Golden shiner (Notemigonus crysoleucas)
- Golden topminnow (Fundulus chrysotus)
- Goldeye (Hiodon alosoides)
- Goldfish (Carassius auratus auratus)
- Goldstripe darter (Etheostoma parvipinne)
- Grass pickerel (Esox americanus vermiculatus)
- Gravel chub (Erimystax x-punctatus)
- Green sunfish (Lepomis cyanellus)
- Greenside darter (Etheostoma blennioides)
- Harlequin darter (Etheostoma histrio)
- Highfin carpsucker (Carpiodes velifer)
- Hybrid striped bass (Morone chrysops × M. saxatilis)
- Inland silverside (Menidia beryllina)
- Ironcolor shiner (Notropis chalybaeus)
- Johnny darter (Etheostoma nigrum)
- Kiamichi shiner (Notropis ortenburgeri)
- Lake chubsucker (Erimyzon sucetta)
- Largemouth bass (Micropterus salmoides)
- Largescale stoneroller (Campostoma oligolepis)
- Least darter (Etheostoma microperca)
- Leopard darter (Percina pantherina)
- Longear sunfish (Lepomis megalotis)
- Longnose darter (Percina nasuta)
- Longnose gar (Lepisosteus osseus)
- Lowland topminnow (Fundulus blairae)
- Mexican tetra (Astyanax mexicanus)
- Mimic shiner (Notropis volucellus)
- Mississippi silvery minnow (Hybognathus nuchalis)
- Mooneye (Hiodon tergisus)
- Eastern mosquitofish (Gambusia holbrooki)
- Western mosquitofish (Gambusia affinis)
- Mountain madtom (Noturus eleutherus)
- Mud darter (Etheostoma asprigene)
- Neosho madtom (Noturus placidus)
- Northern hogsucker (Hypentelium nigricans)
- Northern pike (Esox lucius)
- Northern studfish (Fundulus catenatus)
- Orangebelly darter (Etheostoma radiosum)
- Orangespotted sunfish (Lepomis humilis)
- Orangethroat darter (Etheostoma spectabile)
- Ouachita shiner (Lythrurus snelsoni)
- Ozark cavefish (Amblyopsis rosae)
- Ozark minnow (Notropis nubilus)
- Pallid shiner (Hybopsis amnis)
- Peppered shiner (Notropis perpallidus)
- Pirate perch (Aphredoderus sayanus)
- Plains killifish (Fundulus zebrinus)
- Plains minnow (Hybognathus placitus)
- Plains topminnow (Fundulus sciadicus)
- Prairie chub (Macrhybopsis australis)
- Pugnose minnow (Opsopoeodus emiliae)
- Quillback (Carpiodes cyprinus)
- Rainbow trout (Oncorhynchus mykiss)
- Red River pupfish (Cyprinodon rubrofluviatilis)
- Red River shiner (Notropis bairdi)
- Red shiner (Cyprinella lutrensis)
- Redbreast sunfish (Lepomis auritus)
- Redear sunfish (Lepomis microlophus)
- Redfin darter (Etheostoma whipplei)
- Redfin shiner (Lythrurus umbratilis)
- Redspot chub (Nocomis asper)
- Redspot darter (Etheostoma artesiae)
- Redspotted sunfish (Lepomis miniatus)
- Ribbon shiner (Lythrurus fumeus)
- River carpsucker (Carpiodes carpio)
- River darter (Percina shumardi)
- River redhorse (Moxostoma carinatum)
- River shiner (Notropis blennius)
- Rock bass (Ambloplites rupestris)
- Rocky shiner (Notropis suttkusi)
- Rosyface shiner (Notropis rubellus)
- Sand shiner (Notropis stramineus)
- Sauger (Sander canadensis)
- Scaly sand darter (Ammocrypta vivax)
- Shadow bass (Ambloplites ariommus)
- Shoal chub (Macrhybopsis hyostoma)
- Shorthead redhorse (Moxostoma macrolepidotum)
- Shortnose gar (Lepisosteus platostomus)
- Shovelnose sturgeon (Scaphirhynchus platorynchus)
- Silver chub (Macrhybopsis storeriana)
- Silver Redhorse (moxostoma anisurum)
- Silverband shiner (Notropis shumardi)
- Skipjack shad (Alosa chrysochloris)
- Slender madtom (Noturus exilis)
- Slenderhead darter (Percina phoxocephala)
- Slim minnow (Pimephales tenellus)
- Slough darter (Etheostoma gracile)
- Smallmouth bass (Micropterus dolomieu)
- Smallmouth buffalo (Ictiobus bubalus)
- Southern brook lamprey (Ichthyomyzon gagei)
- Southern redbelly dace (Chrosomus erythrogaster)
- Speckled darter (Etheostoma stigmaeum)
- Spotfin shiner (Cyprinella spiloptera)
- Spotted bass (Micropterus punctulatus)
- Spotted gar (Lepisosteus oculatus)
- Spotted sucker (Minytrema melanops)
- Steelcolor shiner (Cyprinella whipplei)
- Stippled darter (Etheostoma punctulatum)
- Stonecat (Noturus flavus)
- Striped bass (Morone saxatilis)
- Striped shiner (Luxilus chrysocephalus)
- Suckermouth minnow (Phenacobius mirabilis)
- Swamp darter (Etheostoma fusiforme)
- Tadpole madtom (Noturus gyrinus)
- Taillight shiner (Notropis maculatus)
- Threadfin shad (Dorosoma petenense)
- Walleye (Sander vitreus)
- Warmouth (Lepomis gulosus)
- Wedgespot shiner (Notropis greenei)
- Western sand darter (Ammocrypta clara)
- White bass (Morone chrysops)
- White crappie (Pomoxis annularis)
- White sucker (Catostomus commersonii)
- Yellow bass (Morone mississippiensis)
- Yellow bullhead (Ameiurus natalis)
- Yellow perch (Perca flavescens)
