= List of fishes of Arkansas =

The state of Arkansas has a wide variety of freshwater fish species in its rivers, lakes, and streams.

== Sport ==
=== Black bass ===
Order: Perciformes – Family: Centrarchidae

- Native species
  - Largemouth bass, Micropterus salmoides
  - Smallmouth bass, Micropterus dolomieu
  - Spotted bass, Micropterus punctulatus

=== Carps ===
Order: Cypriniformes – Family: Cyprinidae

- Non-native, exotic species
  - Bighead carp, Hypophthalmichthys nobilis
  - Common carp, Cyprinus carpio
  - Grass carp, Ctenopharyngodon idella
  - Silver carp, Hypophthalmichthys molitrix

=== North American catfish ===
Order: Siluriformes – Family: Ictaluridae

- Native species
  - Blue catfish, Ictalurus furcatus
  - Channel catfish, Ictalurus punctatus
  - Flathead catfish, Pylodictis olivaris

=== Pikes ===
Order: Esociformes – Family: Esocidae

- Native species
  - Chain pickerel, Esox niger
  - American pickerel, Esox americanus vermiculatus
- Non-native, exotic species
  - Muskellunge, Esox masquinongy
  - Northern pike, Esox lucius

=== Sunfishes ===
Order: Perciformes – Family: Centrarchidae

- Native species
  - Bluegill, Lepomis macrochirus
  - Green sunfish, Lepomis cyanellus
  - Longear sunfish, Lepomis megalotus
  - Flier, Centrarchus macropterus
  - Redear sunfish, Lepomis microlophus
  - Orangespotted sunfish, Lepomis humilis
  - Warmouth, Lepomis gulosus
  - Redspotted sunfish, Lepomis miniatus
  - Black crappie, Pomoxis nigromaculatus
  - White crappie, Pomoxis annularis
  - Ozark bass, Ambloplites constellatus

=== Temperate bass ===
Order: Perciformes – Family: Moronidae

- Native species
  - White bass, Morone chrysops
  - Yellow bass, Morone mississippiensis
- Non-native, exotic species
  - Striped bass, Morone saxatilis
  - Hybrid striped bass, Morone chrysops × Morone saxatilis

=== Trouts ===
Order: Salmoniformes, Family: Salmonidae

- Non-native, exotic species
  - Brook trout, Salvelinus fontinalis
  - Brown trout, Salmo trutta
  - Cutthroat trout, Oncorhynchus clarkii
  - Lake trout, Salvelinus namaycush
  - Rainbow trout, Oncorhynchus mykiss
  - Tiger trout, Salmo trutta × Salvelinus fontinalis

== Non-sport ==
=== Bowfin ===
Order: Amiiformes, Family: Amiidae

- Native species
  - Bowfin, Amia calva

In Arkansas, the bowfin is typically known as grinnel.

=== North American Catfish ===
Order: Siluriformes, Family: Ictaluridae

- Native species
  - Black bullhead, Ameiurus melas

=== Cavefish ===
Order: Percopsiformes, Family: Amblyopsidae

- Native species
  - Ozark cavefish, Amblyopsis rosae

=== Drums ===
Order: Acanthuriformes, Family: Sciaenidae

- Native species
  - Freshwater drum, Aplodinotus grunniens

=== Gars ===
Order: Lepisosteiformes, Family: Lepisosteidae

- Native species
  - Alligator gar, Atractosteus spatula
  - Spotted gar, Lepisosteus oculatus
  - Longnose gar, Lepisosteus osseus
  - Shortnose gar, Lepisosteus platostomus

=== Minnows ===
Order: Cypriniformes, Family: Cyprinidae

- Native species
  - Bigeye chub, Hybopsis amblops
  - Bigeye shiner, Notropis boops
  - Blackspot shiner, Notropis atrocaudalis
  - Blacktail shiner, Cyprinella venusta
  - Bluehead shiner, Notropis hubbsi
  - Bluntface shiner, Notropis camurus
  - Cardinal shiner, Luxilus cardinalis
  - Cypress minnow, Hybognathus hayi
  - Duskystripe shiner, Luxilus pilsbryi
  - Emerald shiner, Notropis atherinoides
  - Finescale stoneroller, Campostoma pullum
  - Flathead chub, Hybopsis gracilis
  - Ghost shiner, Notropis buchanani
  - Golden shiner, Notemigonus crysoleucas
  - Gravel chub, Hybopsis x-punctata
  - Highland stoneroller, Campostoma spadiceum
  - Hornyhead chub, Nocomis biguttatus
  - Ironcolor shiner, Notropis chalybaeus
  - Largescale stoneroller, Campostoma oligolepis
  - Mississippi silvery minnow, Hybognathus nuchalis
  - Ozark chub, Erimystax harryi
  - Pallid shiner, Notropis amnis
  - Plains minnow, Hybognathus placitus
  - Plains stoneroller, Campostoma plumbeum
  - Pugnose minnow, Notropis emiliae
  - Red River shiner, Notropis bairdi
  - Red shiner, Cyprinella lutrensis
  - Redspot chub, Nocomis asper
  - River shiner, Notropis blennius
  - Sicklefin chub, Hybopsis meeki
  - Silver chub, Hybopsis storeriana
  - Southern redbelly dace, Chrosomus erythrogaster
  - Speckled chub, Hybopsis aestivalis
  - Spotfin shiner, Cyprinella spiloptera
  - Steelcolor shiner, Cyprinella whipplei
  - Streamline chub, Hybopsis dissimilis
  - Striped shiner, Luxilus chrysocephalus
  - Sturgeon chub, Hybopsis gelida
  - Whitetail shiner, Notropis galactura
- Non-native, exotic species
  - Goldfish, Carassius auratus

Order: Cypriniformes, Family: Leuciscidae

- Native species
  - Arkansas River shiner, Notropis girardi
  - Central stoneroller, Campostoma anomalum
  - Chub shiner, Notropis potteri
  - Kiamichi shiner, Notropis ortenburgeri
  - Mimic shiner, Notropis volucellus
  - Ozark minnow, Notropis nubilus
  - Ozark shiner, Notropis ozarcanus
  - Ouachita mountain shiner, Lythrurus snelsoni
  - Peppered shiner, Notropis perpallidus
  - Redfin shiner, Lythrurus umbratilis
  - Ribbon shiner, Notropis fumeus
  - Rosyface shiner, Notropis rubellus
  - Sand shiner, Notropis stramineus
  - Sabine shiner, Notropis sabinae
  - Silverband shiner, Notropis shumardi
  - Taillight shiner, Notropis maculatus
  - Telescope shiner, Notropis telescopus
  - Wedgespot shiner, Notropis greenei
  - Weed shiner, Notropis texanus

=== Paddlefish ===
Order: Acipenseriformes, Family: Polyodontidae

- Native species
  - American paddlefish, Polydon spathula

=== Sturgeons ===
Order: Acipenseriformes, Family: Acipenseridae

- Native species
  - Lake sturgeon, Acipenser fulvescens
  - Atlantic sturgeon, Acipenser oxyrinchus
  - Pallid sturgeon, Scaphirhynchus albus
  - Shovelnose sturgeon, Scaphirhynchus platorynchus

The three types of sturgeon native to Arkansas are uncommon, and two of the species are listed as endangered nationwide. The lake sturgeon is near the southern end of its range in Arkansas, more commonly found in the Upper Midwest. Pallid and shovelnose sturgeon live in large, turbid rivers of the Mississippi Alluvial Plain, including the lower Arkansas, Mississippi, and lower White rivers downstream of impoundments.

=== Eels ===
Order: Anguilliformes, Family: Anguillidae

- Native species
  - American eel, Anguilla rostrata

=== Herrings ===
Order: Clupeiformes, Family: Clupeidae

- Native species
  - Alabama shad, Alosa alabamae
  - Skipjack herring, Alosa chrysochloris
  - Gizzard shad, Dorosoma cepedianum
  - Threadfin shad, Dorosoma petenense

=== Lampreys ===
Order: Petromyzontiformes, Family: Petromyzontidae

- Native species
  - Chestnut lamprey, Ichthyomyzon castaneus
  - Southern brook lamprey, Ichthyomyzon gagei
  - Silver lamprey, ichthyomyzon unicuspis
  - Least brook lamprey, Lampetra aepyptera
  - American brook lamprey, Lenthenteron appendix
- Non-native, exotic species
  - Sea lamprey, Petromyzon marinus

=== Mudminnow ===
Order: Esociformes, Family: Umbridae

- Native species
  - Central mudminnow, Umbra limi

=== Smelts ===
Order: Osmeriformes, Family: Osmeridae

- Native species
  - Rainbow smelt, Osmerus mordax

=== Silversides ===
Order: Atheriniformes, Family Atherinopsidae

- Native species
  - Brook silverside, Labidesthes sicculus
  - Inland silverside, Menidia beryllina

=== Mooneyes ===
Order: Hiodontiformes, Family: Hiodontidae

- Native species
  - Goldeye, Hiodon alosoides
  - Mooneye, Hiodon tergisus

== See also ==
- List of Arkansas Wildlife Management Areas
- Water in Arkansas
