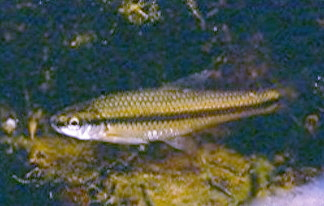

Conservation status
- Endangered (IUCN 3.1)

- Critically Imperiled (NatureServe)

Scientific classification
- Kingdom: Animalia
- Phylum: Chordata
- Class: Actinopterygii
- Division: Teleostei
- Order: Cypriniformes
- Family: Leuciscidae
- Subfamily: Pogonichthyinae
- Genus: Notropis
- Species: N. mekistocholas

Binomial name
- Notropis mekistocholas Snelson, 1971
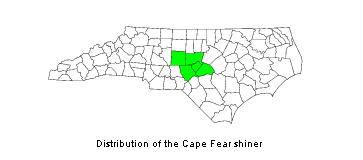
- Counties in North Carolina in which the Cape Fear Shiner is found; green indicates presence

= Cape Fear shiner =

Species of fish

The Cape Fear shiner (Notropis mekistocholas) is a species of freshwater ray-finned fish in the family Leuciscidae, the shiners, daces and minnows. It is endemic to the central part of the state of North Carolina in the southeastern United States, and is only found in the shallow streams of the Cape Fear River basin. The fish is small and yellow with black lips and a black stripe that runs down the middle of the fish's side. This shiner is normally found in mixed schools with other minnow species. It is unique amongst its genus because it has elongated intestines that are specifically adapted to a primarily herbivorous diet. It can breed twice a year and normally lives for only two or three years in the wild. The males and females are normally similar in appearance but become different colors in the spawning season. This species of shiner was not discovered until 1962.

As of 2013, the shiner is endangered, according to the International Union for Conservation of Nature, due to its small population size and threats to its habitat from dam construction and pollution. It was previously listed as critically endangered by the IUCN in 1996. The species has since undergone a successful captive breeding program, and its status has been a significant factor in the destruction of a dam that destroyed part of the shiner's habitat. However, the species is still limited to just five populations in the wild, and some experts believe that a single toxic chemical spill into the Cape Fear River could wipe out the entire wild population.

== Taxonomy ==
The Cape Fear shiner was only discovered in 1962 and described as a distinct species by Franklin F. Snelson Jr. in 1971. The specific epithet is derived from the Greek mēkistos/μηκιστος - 'longest/tallest' or 'very long' (a superlative from mēkos/μηκος - length) and...cholas/χολας 'intestines' or 'bile'. This fish belongs to the carp and minnow family Cyprinidae, and within this family, it belongs to the genus Notropis, which includes a large number of eastern North American minnows. The Cape Fear shiner is unusual in its genus because its intestines are elongated and more convoluted than those of other Notropis species, a trait shared only by the Ozark Minnow. This feature better adapts the shiner to a diet primarily of plant material. It is superficially different from similar members of its genus because of the angle and size of its mouth, head shape, eight anal fin rays, and black edge on its lower lip. It is also one of the few Notropis to have a black peritoneum. Its closest relatives are the Swallowtail Shiner and the Sand Shiner. It has no subspecies.

== Description ==
The Cape Fear shiner is a small but stocky minnow of about 5 centimetres (2 in) long with a maximum length of 7.7 centimetres (3 in). It is mostly a silvery yellowish shade with a black stripe running down the middle of the fish's side to its caudal peduncle and a lighter stripe above this one. The scales are outlined in black. The shiner's fins are clear to yellow and moderately pointed. The dorsal fin's origin is over or slightly before the pelvic fin's origin. During the spawning season, the males become more golden in color while the females become more silvery. The Cape Fear Shiner's snout is acute and rounded and has a black upper lip and a lower lip that has a thin black bar stretching across its margin. The upper lip always overhangs above the lower lip.

The shiner only has pharyngeal teeth (teeth located on the back of the fish's throat on its gill arches), similar to the teeth of other omnivorous shiners. The Cape Fear Shiner's eyes are moderately sized and on the side of the fish's head. It has eight anal fin rays. The shiner's distinctive long dark intestines are coiled and visible through the fish's belly wall and it also has a distinctive black peritoneum.

== Distribution and habitat ==
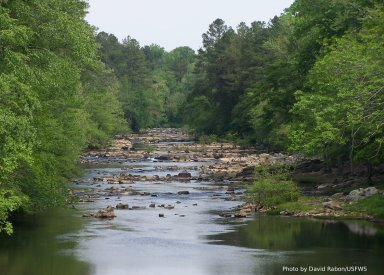
Rocky River shiner habitat

The Cape Fear shiner is endemic to the Upper Basin of the Cape Fear River in North Carolina's Piedmont. Only five wild populations of this fish are known to exist. These populations are found in the freshwater Deep, Haw, and Rocky rivers in Chatham, Harnett, Lee, Moore, and Randolph counties. The largest of these populations is found where the Deep and Rocky Rivers meet. During the winter, shiners may migrate from their shoals in main river channels to smaller tributary streams. This shiner has the smallest range of any Notropis.

This minnow typically lives in clean streams over gravel, cobble, and boulder substrates, especially where nearby water willows and riverweed are available to provide protection from predators. The shiner rarely ventures into water deeper than 0.5 metres (1.6 ft). It has been observed in slow runs, riffles, and slow pools.

== Ecology and behavior ==
The Cape Fear shiner is often found swimming in mixed schools with other minnow species; however, it is never the most numerous minnow in a mixed school. It has been known to survive for six years in captivity, but is believed to survive for only two or three years in the wild.

The Cape Fear shiner's intestines are adapted to help the fish digest plants and they were initially suggested to be primarily herbivorous because of this adaptation. However, recent studies have shown that the shiner eats a variety of both plant and animal matter. It is known to eat detritus, bacteria, phytoplankton, diatoms, and algae.

The shiner is threatened by numerous predators, such as crappie, bass, and the introduced flathead catfish. However, the adult Flathead Catfish does not pose a significant threat because of the differences in habitats of the two species within the river; the juvenile catfish, which share the same habitat as the shiner, may pose a larger threat.

This shiner spawns around May 15 when the water temperature reaches 19 °C (66 °F). A second spawning may occur in the late summer. Both male and female change color while spawning, and the male develops a number of small tubercles along its upper body. The shiner generally moves to slower-flowing pools to lay its eggs in rocky substrates. Eggs hatch after three days, although the young generally live off of their egg yolk for another five days. Juvenile shiners are often found in slow-moving water, particularly amongst large rocks in the middle of a stream or in flooded channels and pools. Juveniles sexually mature after their first year.

== Conservation ==
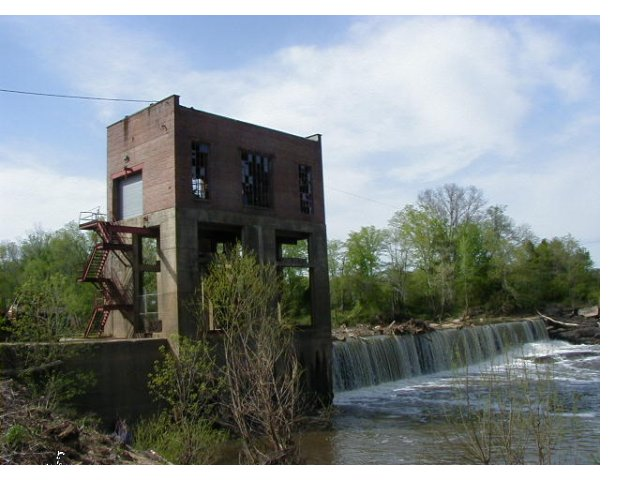
Carbonton Dam, which threatened the shiner's habitat until its destruction in 2005

The Cape Fear shiner is only known from five different populations, two of which are extremely small and run a high risk of extinction. The other three populations are more stable, and are estimated to number between 1500 and 3000 individual fish that are reproductively viable.

The Cape Fear shiner was recognized as "Endangered with Critical Habitat" on September 25, 1987, under the Endangered Species Act of 1973. Since 1987, the shiner has dwindled both in range and population. This fish is also protected from being captured and traded by the Lacey Act. The shiner is not believed to have had historically large populations.

This minnow has been endangered by dam construction on the Cape Fear River, which has led to the flooding and destruction of its shallow water habitat. The small number of geographically separated populations may also threaten the species' genetic health, although a 2004 study concluded that genetic diversity was still relatively high. A deterioration of water quality due to pollution at some of the sites has also threatened the shiner. Experiments have shown that the shiner is highly sensitive to contaminating chemicals, and experts believe that the wild population of this species can be wiped out by a single toxic chemical spill.

The United States Fish and Wildlife Service has been working to protect this species. Some of the conservation methods used to protect this species include studying its biology in the wild and donating $16,000 in 1998 to help maintain a captive population at the North Carolina Zoo. Since the first successful captive breeding in 1997, this species has bred easily in captivity. An experiment was carried out in 2001 in which 900 captive-bred shiners were released temporarily into the wild to judge water quality at potential reintroduction sites.

In the fall of 2005, work crews began removing the Carbonton Dam, which had destroyed part of the shiner's habitat. After the work that removed the dam finished in February 2006, the lake fell back to its historic creek levels, allowing the Cape Fear Shiner to expand its range back into several miles of river that was previously unsuitable for inhabitation because of the dam. In 2009 Deep River's riverine and riparian habitat was surveyed to identify areas for protection or restoration. In 2018 the owner of the Deep River dam in High Falls proposed removing the dam to improve the river ecosystem for the Cape Fear shiner. The plan was suspended indefinitely due to opposition from local residents.
