= Peppered shiner =

Conservation status
- Vulnerable (IUCN 3.1)

Scientific classification
- Kingdom: Animalia
- Phylum: Chordata
- Class: Actinopterygii
- Division: Teleostei
- Order: Cypriniformes
- Family: Leuciscidae
- Subfamily: Pogonichthyinae
- Genus: Notropis
- Species: N. perpallidus

Binomial name
- Notropis perpallidus C. L. Hubbs & J. D. Black, 1940

Species of fish

The peppered shiner or colorless shiner (Miniellus perpallidus) is a species of freshwater ray-finned fish belonging to the family Leuciscidae, the true minnows. It is endemic to the United States where it is found in the Red and Ouachita river drainages in southeastern Oklahoma and southern Arkansas.

Historically the species was found in the Little, Kiamichi, Mountain Fork rivers in Oklahoma and the Antoine, Caddo, Little Missouri, Ouachita, and Saline rivers in Arkansas. However, due to reservoir construction and changes to habitat Peppered Shiners have not been documented outside of the Saline River since 2001 (Robison, 2006).

== Taxonomy ==
The Peppered Shiner was formally described in 1940 by American ichthyologists Carl L. Hubbs and John D. Black with the type locality given as the Saline River 5 miles north of Warren in Bradley County, Arkansas. The specific name refers to the extreme pallor and the species distinctly translucent appearance (Hubbs & Black, 1940).

The phylogenetic position of the Peppered Shiner has moved around since its original placement sister to Kiamichi Shiner (Miniellus ortenburgeri) in 1940. The most recent evaluation of the species phylogeny by Hollingsworth et al. (2013) placed Peppered Shiner next to Swallowtail Shiner (Miniellus procne).

== Ecology and Life History ==
Peppered Shiner habitat preferences are best known from the Saline River population. In summers 2019 and 2020 adults were typically found in deep run habitats adjacent to beds of water willow. Their habitat preferences likely change seasonally, although temporal monitoring of the species is required to support that hypothesis (Miller, 2022). Snelson & Jenkins (1973) reported the species has a short lifespan, with most individuals living two to three years; only a few males have been documented to reach four years. Spawning occurs from late May through August, with sexually mature individuals—especially age 2 and 3 fish—found in reproductive condition during this period. Miller (2022) found individuals larger than the reported maximum size, indicating the species may live longer than four years. Adult Peppered Shiners feeds primarily on aquatic insects, especially dipteran larvae (Snelson & Jenkins, 1973).

== Conservation ==
Snelson & Jenkins (1973) suggested Peppered Shiner be placed on the Endangered Species list due to extensive reservoir construction within its range. The species was petitioned for federal listing in 2010 and is currently under review by the U.S. Fish and Wildlife Service in 2025. Peppered Shiner has been listed as vulnerable by the IUCN Red List since 2013.
