= Goldstripe darter =

Conservation status
- Least Concern (IUCN 3.1)

Scientific classification
- Kingdom: Animalia
- Phylum: Chordata
- Class: Actinopterygii
- Order: Perciformes
- Family: Percidae
- Genus: Etheostoma
- Species: E. parvipinne

Binomial name
- Etheostoma parvipinne C. H. Gilbert & Swain, 1887

Species of fish

The goldstripe darter (Etheostoma parvipinne) is a species of freshwater ray-finned fish, a darter from the subfamily Etheostomatinae, part of the family Percidae, which also contains the perches, ruffes and pikeperches. It is endemic to the southeastern United States where it is found in Gulf Slope streams from the Colorado River drainage in Texas to the Flint River in Georgia, the Atlantic Slope in Ocmulgee River system, Georgia, and the Mississippi embayment north as far as southeastern Missouri and western Kentucky. It is typically found in small springs, streams, and creeks with aquatic and marginal vegetation and detritus. The female spawns on multiple occasions between about mid-March and June, sticking the adhesive eggs to plants, gravel and the sides of rocks. The goldstripe darter is a common species with a wide range and numerous sub-populations, and the International Union for Conservation of Nature has assessed its conservation status as being of "least concern".

== Distribution ==
The goldstripe darter inhabits the Gulf Coastal Plain, including parts of Alabama, Mississippi, Tennessee, Kentucky, Arkansas, Louisiana, and Oklahoma, and lower Mississippi drainages westward as far as the Colorado River Basin in Texas. Most recently, goldstripe darters have been confirmed in these drainages:

- Savannah River
- Ogeechee-Altamaha River (including drainages from south of the Savannah River to and including the Altamaha River)
- Apalachicola Basin (including the Chipola, Chattahoochee, Flint, and Apalachicola Rivers)
- St. Andrew-Choctawhatchee-Pensacola Bays
- Coosa-Tallapoosa River
- Alabama-Cahaba River
- Tombigbee-Black Warrior River
- Pascagoula-Biloxi-Bay St. Louis
- Pearl River
- Lake Pontchartrain
- Minor Mississippi Tributaries South
- Black-Yazoo River
- Minor Mississippi Tributaries North
- Lower Tennessee River
- St. Francis River
- White River
- Ouachita River
- Red River
- Sabine Lake
- Galveston Bay
- San Jacinto River
- Brazos River
- Colorado River

Other than occasional passing mention, little historical records exist of goldstripe darter distribution, making it difficult to determine in what ways, if any, the distribution has changed over time. Populations are currently believed to be stable.

== Ecology ==
=== Habitat ===
The goldstripe darter is typically found in small springs, streams, and creeks with vegetative cover, whether that be aquatic vegetation, algae beds, or detritus. Preferred substrates include sand, small gravel, and rubble. Goldstripe darters do not tend to be found in rivers or streams wider than 15 feet (4.6 m) or those with large gravel or mud substrates.

The goldstripe darter's preferred pH seems to be between 6.1 and 6.5. However, a population has been found that can withstand pH as low as 2.9. It prefers temperate climates, located between 38°N and 31°N in latitude.

=== Feeding ===
The goldstripe darter feeds on midge larvae, dipteran pupae, caddisfly larvae, dytiscid beetle larvae, and small crayfish.

=== Associated species ===
Fishes most often found with the goldstripe darter include:

- Erimyzon oblongus
- Etheostoma collettei
- Etheostoma gracile
- Etheostoma proeliare
- Etheostoma whipplei
- Notropis atrocaudalis
- Notropis umbratilis
- Noturus nocturnus
- Semotilus atromaculatus

It is reasonable to believe some of these species, particularly those in the genus Etheostoma, may compete with the goldstripe darter for resources.

== Lifecycle ==
At adulthood, goldstripe darters typically range from 35 to 55 mm (1.4 to 2.2 in) in length. Two of the largest goldstripe darters recorded were a female measuring 61.8 mm (2.43 in) and a male measuring 67 mm (2.6 in).

=== Reproduction ===
Spawning likely occurs from mid-March through June. During spawning, male body color changes from uniform olive-brown or olive-brown with darker blotches, to brown with black vertical bars. The black teardrop darkens and eye color becomes intensely red. Pelvic and anal fins darken from dusky to uniform black, and dorsal fin becomes intensely black.

Males perform stationary, lateral displays with erect dorsal fins during aggressive encounters with other males, but no elaborate courting displays were observed between males and females. Males pursue females, waiting for them to spawn. Goldstripe darters mate with multiple partners during the breeding season and do not seem to give any parental care. Multiple spawnings occur each year.

Goldstripe darter eggs are strongly adhesive and are attached singly to the spawning substrate. The eggs will be attached to plants, gravel, and occasionally on the sides of rocks. Goldstripe darters do not bury their eggs. Clutch size is estimated at 66, and average egg size is roughly 0.86 mm in diameter.

== Management ==
Presently, the goldstripe darter is not considered endangered. Populations are thought to be stable. Thus, no current management programs are specifically designed for the goldstripe darter, though it does benefit from general riparian protection and buffers.

== Recommendations ==
Few data exist for the historical distribution of the goldstripe darter, so determining whether the goldstripe has lost any of its former range is difficult. To spot any declines in the species in the future, periodic assessments of abundances should be conducted in small streams throughout its range. Goldstripe darters are vulnerable to seining and electroshocking for sampling purposes.

The goldstripe darter is likely to be vulnerable to sedimentation from logging, channelization, or agricultural runoff. Management plans designed to maintain and develop forested riparian zones adjacent to first-order streams would assist with its conservation. Because goldstripe darter populations tend to be isolated from each other, recolonization would be difficult after a disturbance.
