= Skygazer shiner =

Conservation status
- Least Concern (IUCN 3.1)

Scientific classification
- Kingdom: Animalia
- Phylum: Chordata
- Class: Actinopterygii
- Order: Cypriniformes
- Family: Leuciscidae
- Subfamily: Pogonichthyinae
- Genus: Miniellus
- Species: M. uranoscopus

Binomial name
- Miniellus uranoscopus Suttkus, 1959

Synonyms
- Notropis uranoscopus Suttkuss, 1959

Species of fish

The skygazer shiner (Miniellus uranoscopus) s a species of freshwater ray-finned fish belonging to the family Leuciscidae, the shiners, daces and minnows. It is found in the Alabama River drainage in the U.S. state of Alabama.
