= Blackmouth shiner =

Conservation status
- Vulnerable (IUCN 3.1)

Scientific classification
- Kingdom: Animalia
- Phylum: Chordata
- Class: Actinopterygii
- Order: Cypriniformes
- Family: Leuciscidae
- Subfamily: Pogonichthyinae
- Genus: Miniellus
- Species: M. melanostomus

Binomial name
- Miniellus melanostomus (Bortone, 1989)

Synonyms
- Notropis melanostomus Bortone, 1989

Species of fish

The blackmouth shiner (Miniellus melanostomus) is a species of freshwater ray-finned fish belonging to the family Leuciscidae, the shiners, daces and minnows. It is endemic to the United States. It is found in the Blackwater-Yellow river systems in Florida, Bay Minette Creek in Alabama, and the lower Pascagoula River system in Mississippi.
