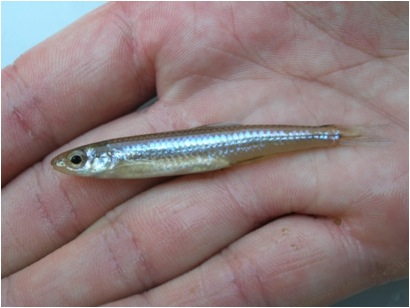

Conservation status
- Endangered (IUCN 3.1)

Scientific classification
- Kingdom: Animalia
- Phylum: Chordata
- Class: Actinopterygii
- Order: Cypriniformes
- Family: Leuciscidae
- Subfamily: Pogonichthyinae
- Genus: Miniellus
- Species: M. albizonatus

Binomial name
- Miniellus albizonatus Warren & Burr, 1994

Synonyms
- Notropis albizonatus Warren & Burr, 1994

= Palezone shiner =

Species of fish

The palezone shiner (Miniellus albizonatus) is a species of freshwater ray-finned fish belonging to the family Leuciscidae, the shiners, daces and minnows. This rare fish is native to Alabama and Kentucky in the United States. It once occurred in Tennessee, but it has been extirpated from the state. There are two populations remaining. It is a federally listed endangered species of the United States.

This fish, which was first described in 1994, is "among the most jeopardized fish species in the United States." The two populations are located in the Paint Rock River of Alabama, a tributary of the Tennessee River, and the Little South Fork of the Cumberland River in Kentucky. Its distribution was once wider; it has also been collected from a tributary of the Clinch River in Tennessee.

This minnow is up to 6 centimetres (2.4 inches) in length. It is very slender and cylindrical in shape. It is straw-colored with dark margins on some of its rear scales. There is a dark, silvery lateral stripe and a spot near the tail. A pale stripe runs above the dark lateral line, giving the fish its name.

This fish lives in flowing streams with clear water and rocky, sandy bottoms. Little is known about the ecology of the species. The species spawns in late spring and summer; little else is known about its reproduction.

This species is a widely disjunct distribution, with two isolated populations located far apart. Its range may have become reduced long ago or it may owe its rarity to more current, degraded conditions in its habitat, or both. Its extirpation from Tennessee was caused by coal mining pollution and the construction of reservoirs.
