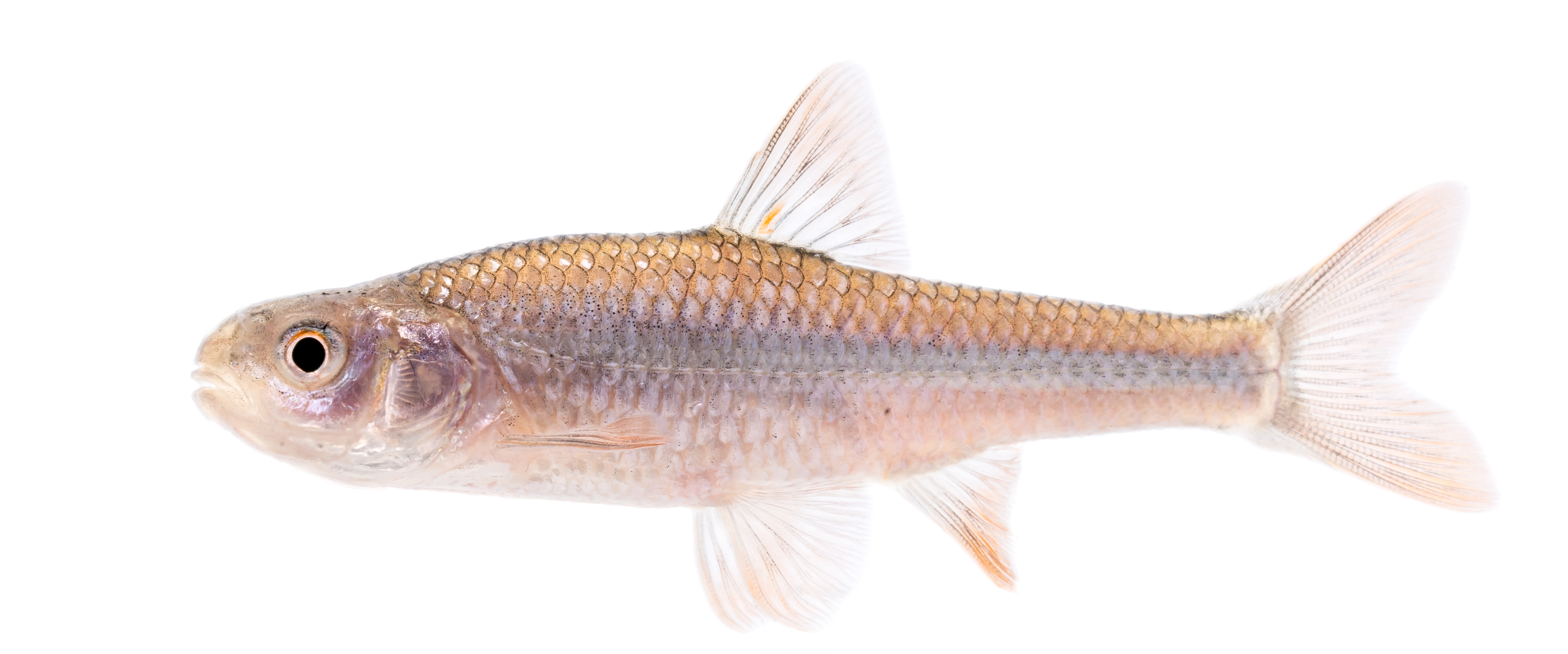
- At Gavins Point National Fish Hatchery

Conservation status
- Least Concern (IUCN 3.1)

- Endangered (ESA)

Scientific classification
- Kingdom: Animalia
- Phylum: Chordata
- Class: Actinopterygii
- Order: Cypriniformes
- Family: Leuciscidae
- Genus: Miniellus
- Species: M. topeka

Binomial name
- Miniellus topeka (C. H. Gilbert, 1884)

Synonyms
- Cliola topeka C. H. Gilbert, 1884; Notropis topeka (C. H. Gilbert, 1884); Moniana tristis Girard, 1856; Notropis tristis (Girard, 1856); Notropis aeneolus Hay, 1887

= Topeka shiner =

Species of fish

The Topeka shiner (Miniellus topeka) is a species of freshwater ray-finned fish belonging to the family Leuciscidae, the shiners, daces and minnows. This species is found in North America.

== Description ==
The Topeka shiner is a type of minnow that does not grow longer than a few inches. This minnow is a shiny silver color. Its main physical characteristic is the black colored stripe that runs along the side of the body.

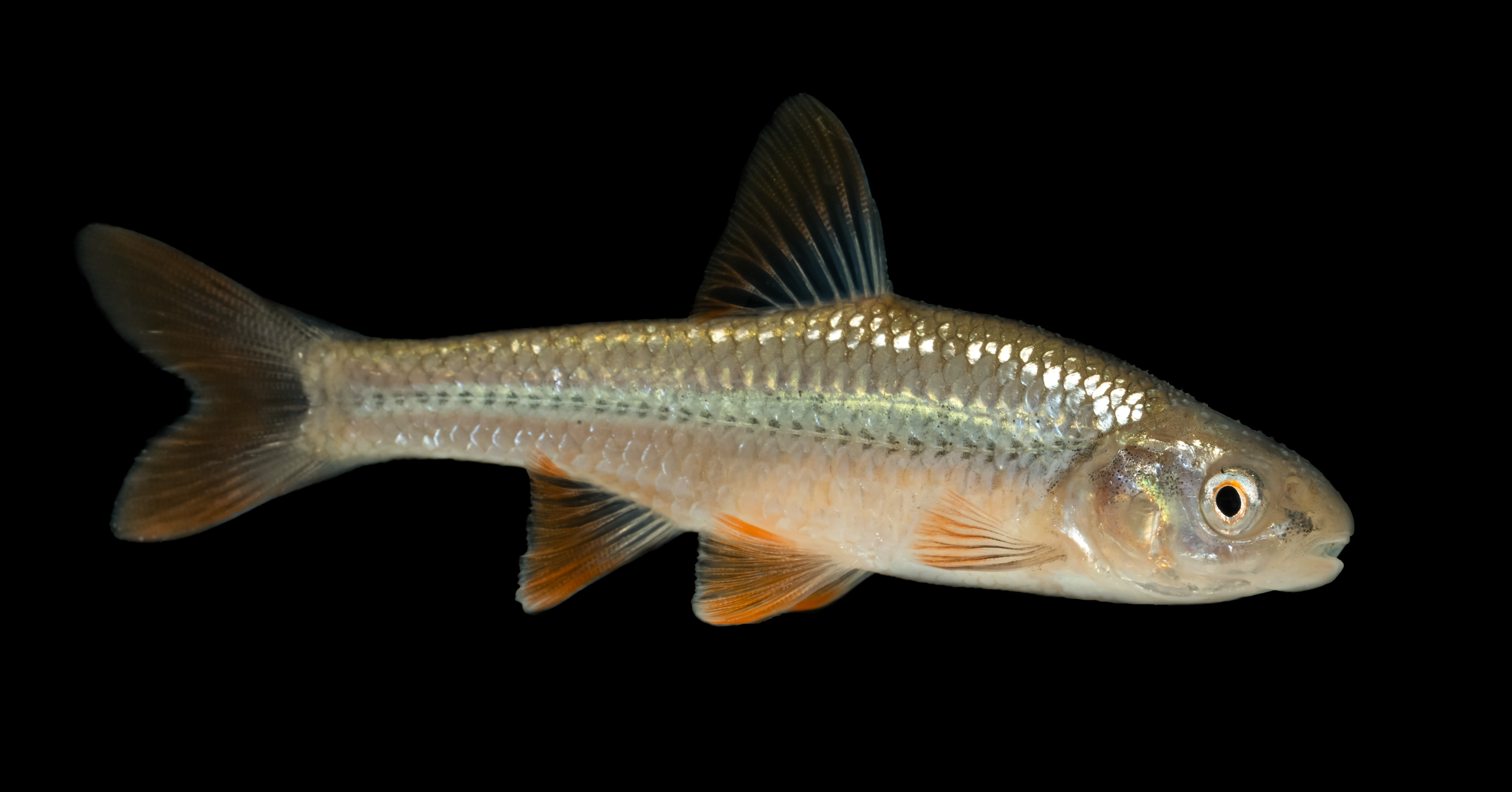
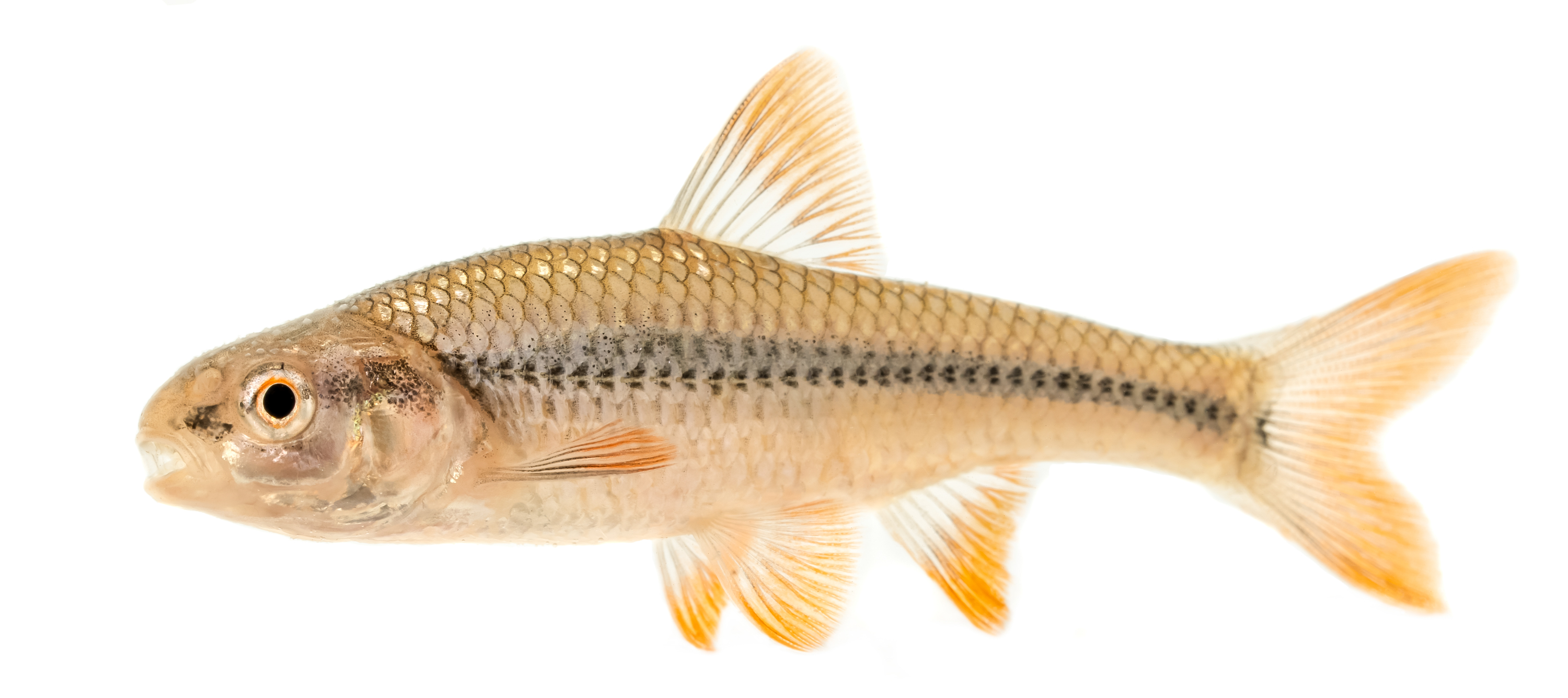
Breeding males

== Distribution and habitat ==
Miniellus topeka was formerly broadly distributed in the northwestern Mississippi River basin, from southern Minnesota and eastern South Dakota south to central Missouri and western Kansas.

The Topeka shiner lives mainly in prairie streams. In order for the Topeka shiner to survive the water must be cold and clear. The streams in which this Minnow lives are typically consistent and run year long. In cases in which the stream does dry up, the Topeka Shiner needs to find a new stream or permanent body of water to survive. Oxbow lakes are especially important habitat for Topeka shiners, as in faster moving bodies of water, they are easily picked off.

== Conservation and threats ==
The Topeka shiner was listed as Endangered by the U.S. Fish and Wildlife Service in 1998. The species is endangered primarily because of the water quality need. This species relies on clean water to survive. When the streams water quality changes the Topeka shiner has difficulty adjusting to the changes. The water quality can change due to both environmental and human impact. A main cause for the decline in population is human activity. The water quality changes and the minnow are impacted when natural plant life is taken away. Any type of construction such as road work, new homes and other types of development can affect the habitat in which the Topeka shiner lives.

In particular, the infilling of oxbow lakes due to agricultural runoff-induced erosion and channelization robbed the shiners of slow currents and vegetation to spawn in and hide from predators. However, thanks to oxbow restoration efforts by the Iowa Topeka Shiner Recovery Partnership, comprising the Iowa Soybean Association, the United States Fish and Wildlife Service, the Practical Farmers of Iowa, and The Nature Conservancy of Iowa, the US Fish and Wildlife Service recommended that the Topeka shiners be downlisted to Threatened status in 2021. Oxbow restoration can be as simple as digging out excess sediment and connecting rivers to oxbows.
