= Orangefin shiner =

Conservation status
- Least Concern (IUCN 3.1)

Scientific classification
- Kingdom: Animalia
- Phylum: Chordata
- Class: Actinopterygii
- Order: Cypriniformes
- Family: Leuciscidae
- Subfamily: Pogonichthyinae
- Genus: Miniellus
- Species: M. ammophilus

Binomial name
- Miniellus ammophilus (Suttkus & Boschung, 1990)

Synonyms
- Notropis ammophilus Suttkus & Boschung, 1990

Species of fish

The orangefin shiner (Miniellus ammophilus) is a species of freshwater ray-finned fish belonging to the family Leuciscidae, the shiners, daces and minnows. It is widely distributed in the Mobile basin, below the Fall Line in Alabama and Mississippi, with disjunct populations occurring in the Yellow Creek system of the Tennessee River drainage in northern Mississippi, in the headwaters of the Hatchie River system in northern Mississippi and southwestern Tennessee, and the Skuna River system of the Yazoo drainage in northern Mississippi.
