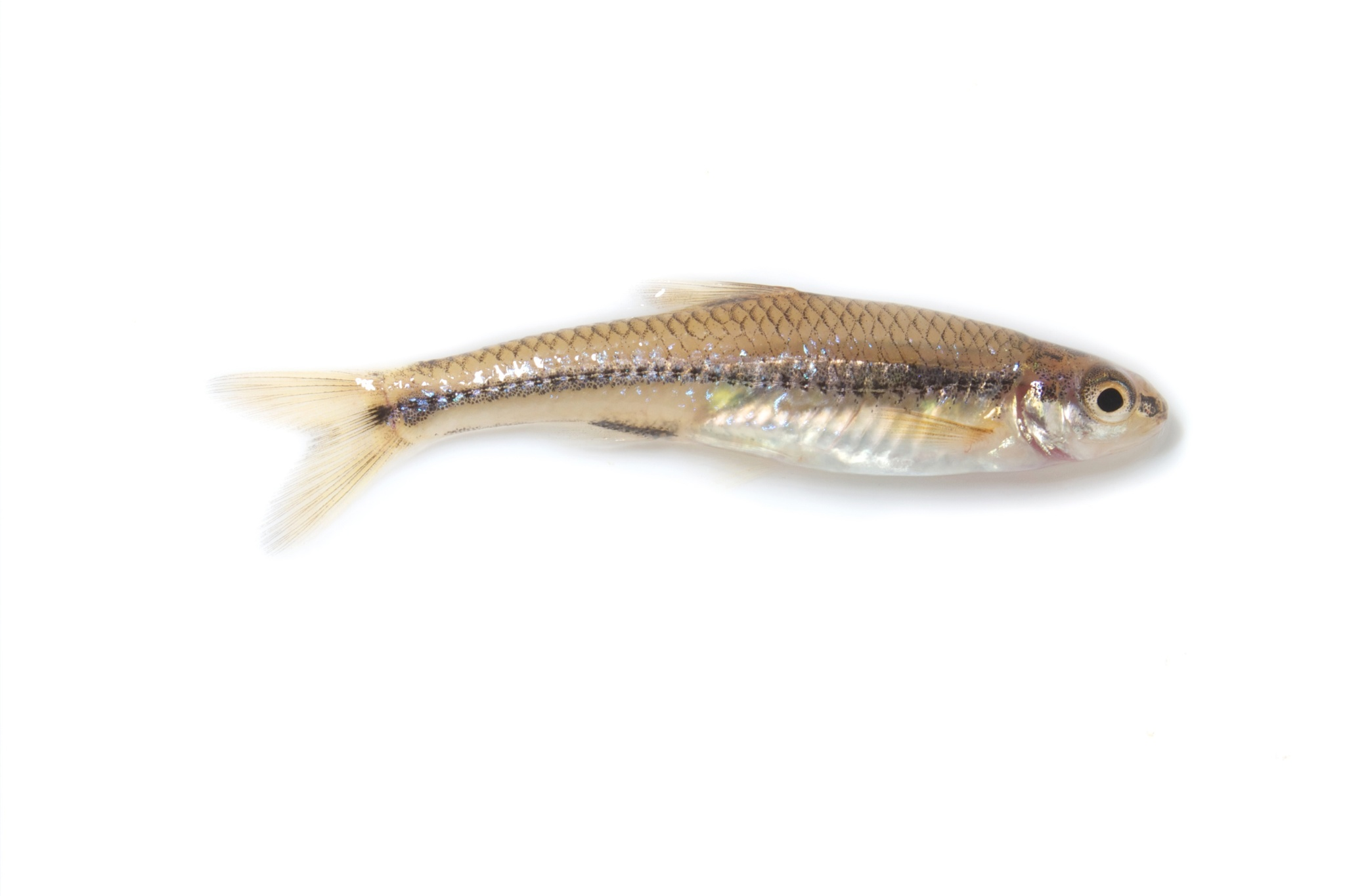
- Swallowtail shiner (Hybognathus procne)

Scientific classification
- Kingdom: Animalia
- Phylum: Chordata
- Class: Actinopterygii
- Order: Cypriniformes
- Family: Leuciscidae
- Subfamily: Pogonichthyinae
- Genus: Miniellus; D. S. Jordan, 1882

Type species
- Hybognathus procne Cope, 1865

= Miniellus =

Genus of fishes

Miniellus is a genus of freshwater ray-finned fishes belonging to the family Leuciscidae, the shiners, daces and minnows. The species in this genus are found in North America.

== Species ==
Miniellus contains the following valid species:

- Miniellus albizonatus Warren & Burr, 1994 (Palezone shiner)
- Miniellus alborus C. L. Hubbs & Raney, 1947 (Whitemouth shiner)
- Miniellus ammophilus Suttkus & Boschung, 1990 (Orangefin shiner)
- Miniellus boops C. H. Gilbert, 1884 (Bigeye shiner)
- Miniellus chihuahua Woolman, 1892 (Chihuahua shiner)
- Miniellus greenei C. L. Hubbs & Ortenburger, 1929 (Wedgespot shiner)
- Miniellus heterodon (Cope, 1865) (Blackchin shiner)
- Miniellus longirostris (O. P. Hay, 1881) (Longnose shiner)
- Miniellus melanostomus Bortone, 1989 (Blackmouth shiner)
- Miniellus nubilus (S. A. Forbes, 1878) (Ozark minnow)
- Miniellus ortenburgeri C. L. Hubbs, 1927 (Kiamichi shiner)
- Miniellus procne (Cope, 1865) (Swallowtail shiner)
- Miniellus sabinae D. S. Jordan & C. H. Gilbert, 1886 (Sabine shiner)
- Miniellus stramineus (Cope, 1865) (Sand shiner)
- Miniellus topeka (C. H. Gilbert, 1884) (Topeka shiner)
- Miniellus uranoscopus Suttkus, 1959 (Skygazer shiner)
