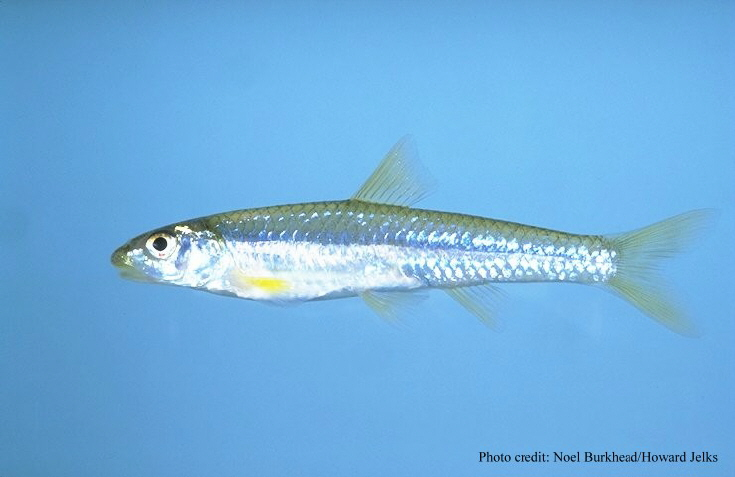

Conservation status
- Least Concern (IUCN 3.1)

Scientific classification
- Kingdom: Animalia
- Phylum: Chordata
- Class: Actinopterygii
- Order: Cypriniformes
- Family: Leuciscidae
- Subfamily: Pogonichthyinae
- Genus: Miniellus
- Species: M. longirostris

Binomial name
- Miniellus longirostris (O. P. Hay, 1881)

Synonyms
- Alburnops longirostris O. P. Hay, 1881; Hybopsis longirostris (O. P. Hay, 1881); Notropis longirostris (O. P. Hay, 1881)

= Longnose shiner =

Species of fish

The longnose shiner (Miniellus longirostris) is a species of freshwater ray-finned fish belonging to the family Leuciscidae, the shiners, daces and minnows. It is found in the Southeastern United States.

== Description ==
Longnose shiners are elongate, straw-colored shiners with a long, bunt snout, broadly rounded head, and a large subterminal, nearly horizontal mouth. The predorsal profile is moderately arched relative to the flatter, ventral profile. Both dorsal and ventral aspects taper abruptly from the level of the dorsal origin, posteriorly. They have small eyes situated high on the head, giving the impression of an upward-looking fish when viewed from above. Their teeth are usually 1,4-4,1 and are hooked and have prominent grinding surfaces. The tooth in the anterior row, when present, is often weak and easily broken. The dorsal and anal fins are moderately high, about equally elevated, and slightly rounded at the tips. The margin of the dorsal fin is mostly straight, and the anal fin in emarginate. In both fins, the anterior rays are somewhat longer than the posterior rays when depressed. The dorsal fin has 8 (7-8) rays and its origin is slightly anterior to the pelvic fin, which has 8 (7-8) rays. The pectoral fins have 14-15 (13-17) rays and the anal fins have 7 (6-8) rays. The breast is unscaled and the belly is scaled to partially scaled. The lateral line is complete and mostly straight, with a slight decurve. They are usually no more than 58 mm in length. Mature males average 34.9 mm in length while females average 33.8 mm.

The back and sides above the lateral line are pale yellow, with a dusky cross-hatched pattern and a thin, but noticeable, middorsal stripe. The lower sides and ventral side is typically silvery or silvery white. Though usually obscure or absent, some fish may have a faint lateral stripe, especially on the caudal peduncle; pigment of the lateral stipe is confined to the areas above the lateral-line. There is no concentration of melanophores at the base of the caudal fin and all fins lack dark pigment. The fins of breeding individuals, particularly males, have a bright lemon yellow pigment. Males may also have yellow snouts.

== Diet ==
Longnose shiners generally feed during the day, with peak activity in the morning. They primarily feed of dipteran larvae and other aquatic insects. Small crustaceans, such as copepods, clasocerans, and ostracods are also a part of their diet. The only terrestrial insect they eat are ants. Longnose shiners also eat various plant materials, such as seeds of various sedges, diatoms, desmids, filamentous algae, and aquatic fungi. With increasing size, longnose shiners can have a more diverse diet, and have been found include mayfly larvae in their diets.

== Habitat ==
The longnose shiner is a benthic, schooling species found most often in moderate current over clean sand or small gravel substrata in medium to large streams. Their habitats are often described as shallow (depths to ca. 60 cm), clean, white, open, sand areas along the edges of sand bars in low to moderate flow. Though they are most abundant near the lower end of sand bars and shoal, where there is a reduced current flow, they are also commonly found in areas where stream banks are covered with woody or brushy vegetation. Longnose shiners have also been found to colonize disturbed areas around bridge repair sites where the operation of heavy machinery has created a shallow, sand-bottom stream channel.

== Reproduction and life cycle ==
The sex ratio of longnose shiners is about 1:1, and both sexes mature at about the same size (30 mm) The average size of males are about 34.9 millimetres (1.37 in) long and females are about 33.8 millimetres (1.33 in) long. The average size of females tends to vary in different drainage systems. Larger females usually produce larger ova, with mature ova diameters averaging from 0.84 to 0.95 mm. Variances in female size and average diameters of mature ova seem to be strongly correlated with the amount of surface runoff in the area.

The breeding season of longnose shiners typically lasts from March until October, in waters of about 17–29 °C (63–84 °F). Longnose shiners generally produce multiple clutches during a breeding season. There may be two breeding peaks, one at the very beginning of the season and then another in the middle of the season, around July. Females average from 62 to 121 mature ova per clutch and usually produce anywhere from 15 to 129 eggs. Longnose shiners do not prepare the substrate for a spawning event, and instead practice broadcast spawning, in which they scatter the eggs and sperm. This type of reproduction results in a lack of parental care to both egg and larvae.

In the wild, longnose shiners are expected to live between 1 and 2.5 years in the wild. While some fish can survive up to their third summer, most do not survive to their third winter.

== Distribution ==
Longnose shiners are widely distributed throughout the southeastern coastal states of the United States. Their range extends from just west of the Mississippi River in Louisiana to Florida. In Louisiana, they are common and widespread throughout the Florida parishes and northward into the lower Ouachita River drainage system in Catahoula Parish. In Mississippi, they are found in the lower part of the Yazoo River drainage system. They are also found to the upper Altamaha River drainage system and the Ocmulgee River system in Georgia. Isolated populations can also be found in the upper Coosa River system and several smaller tributaries in the Alabama River drainage system.

== Importance to humans ==
Longnose shiners are too small to be a game fish or to be used as food, but they are often used as bait by anglers who make use of their silver shiny color to attract bigger fish.

== Etymology ==
The genus name, Notropis, is misnomer given by Rafinesque to shriveled specimens, with the meaning of "back keel"; from the Greek word, noton, meaning back. The species name, longirostris, comes from the Latin word longus, meaning long, and the Latin word rostrum, meaning snout, referring to the long snout on this species.

== See also ==
- Shiner (general)
- Notropis (general)
