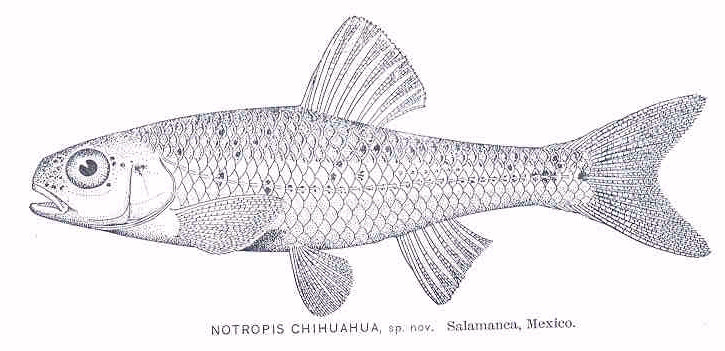

Conservation status
- Least Concern (IUCN 3.1)

- Vulnerable (NatureServe)

Scientific classification
- Kingdom: Animalia
- Phylum: Chordata
- Class: Actinopterygii
- Division: Teleostei
- Order: Cypriniformes
- Family: Leuciscidae
- Subfamily: Pogonichthyinae
- Genus: Miniellus
- Species: M. chihuahua

Binomial name
- Miniellus chihuahua (Woolman, 1892)

Synonyms
- Notropis chihuahua Woolman, 1892

= Chihuahua shiner =

Species of fish

The Chihuahua shiner (Miniellus chihuahua) is a species of freshwater ray-finned fish belonging to the family Leuciscidae, the shiners, daces and minnows. It is found in southern Texas and northern Mexico.

== Description ==
The Chihuahua shiner has a stout, barely compressed body which is deepest under its nape with the mouth being horizontal and situated under the rather rounded snout. It has a complete lateral line; there are normally less than 10 rays in the dorsal fin and the longest ray is twice the length of the last ray and the first ray is a tiny splinter-like ray which is closely attached to the second ray, which is a well developed unbranched ray. The origin of the dorsal fin is directly over that of the pelvic fin. The anal fin has 7 soft rays. It has a thin lower lip which lacks any fleshy lobes. The lateral line has 33-37 scales and is normally straight or it is a broad arch. Breeding males develop tubercles but these are less marked in non-breeding males and are absent in females. It has numerous large black spots widely scattered over the straw yellow back, the opercle, the area beneath the eye and the sides of snout; there is a black wedge on the caudal peduncle. The lateral line pores at front are outlined in black while the lips are yellow to pale orange as are the dorsal, caudal, and pectoral fins. It often shows a dusky stripe along the back with another stripe along the silvery flank which is dusky at the head end shading to black at the rear. It is white below with a silvery peritoneum. It grows to 64 mm (2.5 in) in standard length or 8 cm (3.1 in) total length.

== Distribution ==
The Chihuahua shiner is found in the Rio Grande drainage from near the mouth to the mouth of the Rio Conchos and lower Pecos River in Texas. It is also found in the smaller tributaries of the Rio Conchos in Chihuahua and Durango in Mexico where it is abundant.

== Habitat and ecology ==
The Chihuahua shiner is a species of small to medium sized streams where it occurs in areas with gravel to sand substrates, in clear, cool, flowing waters; it has also been recorded over rubble bottoms with some boulders, bedrock and silt. It may occur where vegetation is present. Areas where it is found are often associated with springs. It has a long spawning season which lasts from March through to early August. The females have 400 to 900 mature ova in their ovaries and there are usually more males than females with the sex ratio varying from 1.3 males: 1 female to 1.6 males:1 female. Examination of the gut contents show that these fish prey mostly on small aquatic insects. The most common intestinal parasite is a nematode. They are known to live for up to two years.

== Conservation ==
Threats to the Chihuahua shiner include the depletion of water in the tributary creeks which are critical to the breeding and rearing of young and the introduction of exotic fish which may compete with or prey on this species.
