= Whitemouth shiner =

Conservation status
- Least Concern (IUCN 3.1)

Scientific classification
- Kingdom: Animalia
- Phylum: Chordata
- Class: Actinopterygii
- Division: Teleostei
- Order: Cypriniformes
- Family: Leuciscidae
- Genus: Miniellus
- Species: M. alborus

Binomial name
- Miniellus alborus (C. L. Hubbs & Raney, 1947)

Synonyms
- Notropis alborus C. L. Hubbs & Raney, 1947

Species of fish

The whitemouth shiner (Miniellus alborus) is a species of freshwater ray-finned fish belonging to the family Leuciscidae, the shiners, daces and minnows. It is native to the eastern United States, where it occurs in the Piedmont in the states of Virginia, North Carolina, and South Carolina.

The species was described in 1947 from a creek that joins the Deep River in Randolph County, North Carolina.
