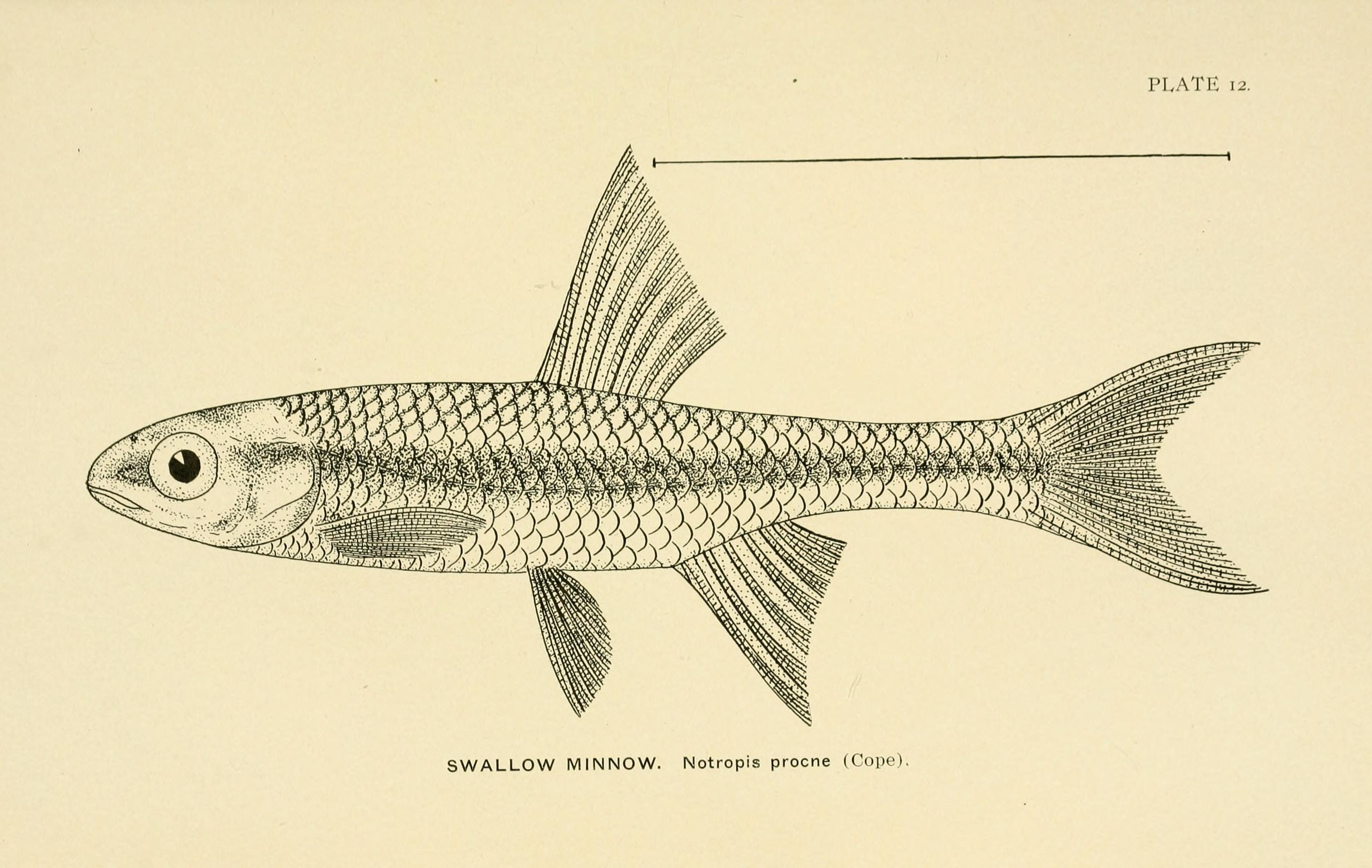
- Drawing of Notropis procne

Conservation status
- Least Concern (IUCN 3.1)

Scientific classification
- Kingdom: Animalia
- Phylum: Chordata
- Class: Actinopterygii
- Division: Teleostei
- Order: Cypriniformes
- Family: Leuciscidae
- Subfamily: Pogonichthyinae
- Genus: Miniellus
- Species: M. procne

Binomial name
- Miniellus procne (Cope, 1865)

Synonyms
- Hybognathus procne Cope, 1865; Notropis procne (Cope, 1865); Hybopsis longiceps Cope, 1868

= Swallowtail shiner =

Species of fish

The swallowtail shiner (Miniellus procne) is a species of freshwater ray-finned fish belonging to the family Leuciscidae, the shiners, daces and minnows. This species is found in North America. It has a slender and long body of about 40–55 millimetres (1.6–2.2 in). The shiner has a pale yellow back with a blue stripe on its silver side. It also has a silvery white belly. Its fins are yellowish and it has a dorsal fin originating above the back half of the pelvic fin base and a tail fin with a black spot at its base. When viewed from above, two pigmented stripes are visible near the dorsal fin: one predorsally and the postdorsally. Its snout is either slightly pointed or slightly rounded. The swallowtail shiner lives in warm creeks and in river pools.

It is known to live in Atlantic drainages from New York to South Carolina. It may have been introduced to the New River system in Virginia, although it is possible that it is native there. It may have spread via canals into tributaries of Lake Ontario. It is often found near plants. The shiner eats insects, worms, mites, microcrustaceans, and algae. Juvenile shiners mature after a year and spawn from mid-May to July when the water reaches a temperature of 25.6 °C (78.1 °F). Fecundity is unknown in this species and it breeds well in aquariums. It is similar to the closely related Cape Fear shiner and sand shiner.

== Taxonomy ==
There are two subspecies of swallowtail shiner: Miniellus procne procne and M. procne longiceps (Cope, 1868). The nominate subspecies is found in the Delaware River and Susquehanna Rivers south to the James River in Virginia. M. procne longiceps is found from the Roanoke River in Virginia to the Santee River in South Carolina.

This species is the type species of the genus Miniellus, which was originally proposed as a subgenus of the genus Notropis, but is now regarded as a valid genus, within the subfamily Pogonichthyinae in the family Leuciscidae.
