= Sabine shiner =

Conservation status
- Least Concern (IUCN 3.1)

Scientific classification
- Kingdom: Animalia
- Phylum: Chordata
- Class: Actinopterygii
- Order: Cypriniformes
- Family: Leuciscidae
- Subfamily: Pogonichthyinae
- Genus: Miniellus
- Species: M. sabinae

Binomial name
- Miniellus sabinae (D. S. Jordan & C. H. Gilbert, 1886)

Synonyms
- Notropis sabinae D. S. Jordan & C. H. Gilbert, 1886

Species of fish

The Sabine shiner (Miniellus sabinae) is a species of freshwater ray-finned fish belonging to the family Leuciscidae, the shiners, daces and minnows.

It is endemic to the United States. It is native to:

- St. Francis and lower White, and lower Black River drainages in Missouri and Arkansas.
- Little River system (lower Red River of the South drainage) in Louisiana.
- Gulf Coast drainages from Calcasieu River in Louisiana to San Jacinto River in Texas.
