= Wedgespot shiner =

Conservation status
- Least Concern (IUCN 3.1)

Scientific classification
- Kingdom: Animalia
- Phylum: Chordata
- Class: Actinopterygii
- Order: Cypriniformes
- Family: Leuciscidae
- Subfamily: Pogonichthyinae
- Genus: Miniellus
- Species: M. greenei

Binomial name
- Miniellus greenei (C. L. Hubbs & Ortenburger, 1929)

Synonyms
- Notropis greenei Hubbs & Ortenburger, 1929

Species of fish

The wedgespot shiner (Miniellus greenei) is a species of freshwater ray-finned fish belonging to the family Leuciscidae, the shiners, daces and minnows. It is endemic to the United States, where it is found in the Ozark Uplands of the middle Arkansas River drainage of central Arkansas, northeastern Oklahoma, and southwestern Missouri. It is also found in the White, Black, and St. Francis river systems of northern Arkansas and southeastern Missouri, and the Meramec, Gasconade, and lower Osage river systems of eastern Missouri.
