= Redspot chub =

Conservation status
- Least Concern (IUCN 3.1)

Scientific classification
- Kingdom: Animalia
- Phylum: Chordata
- Class: Actinopterygii
- Order: Cypriniformes
- Family: Leuciscidae
- Genus: Nocomis
- Species: N. asper

Binomial name
- Nocomis asper Lachner & R. E. Jenkins, 1971

Species of fish

The redspot chub (Nocomis asper) is a species of freshwater fish belonging to the family Leuciscidae, the shiners, daces and minnows. This species is found primarily in the Ozark uplands of the Arkansas River drainage in northwestern Arkansas, southwestern Missouri, southeastern Kansas, and northeastern Oklahoma. It can grow to 22 cm (8.7 in) total length.
