= Kiamichi shiner =

Conservation status
- Data Deficient (IUCN 3.1)

Scientific classification
- Kingdom: Animalia
- Phylum: Chordata
- Class: Actinopterygii
- Order: Cypriniformes
- Family: Leuciscidae
- Subfamily: Pogonichthyinae
- Genus: Miniellus
- Species: M. ortenburgeri

Binomial name
- Miniellus ortenburgeri (C. L. Hubbs, 1927)

Synonyms
- Notropis ortenburgeri C. L. Hubbs, 1927

Species of fish

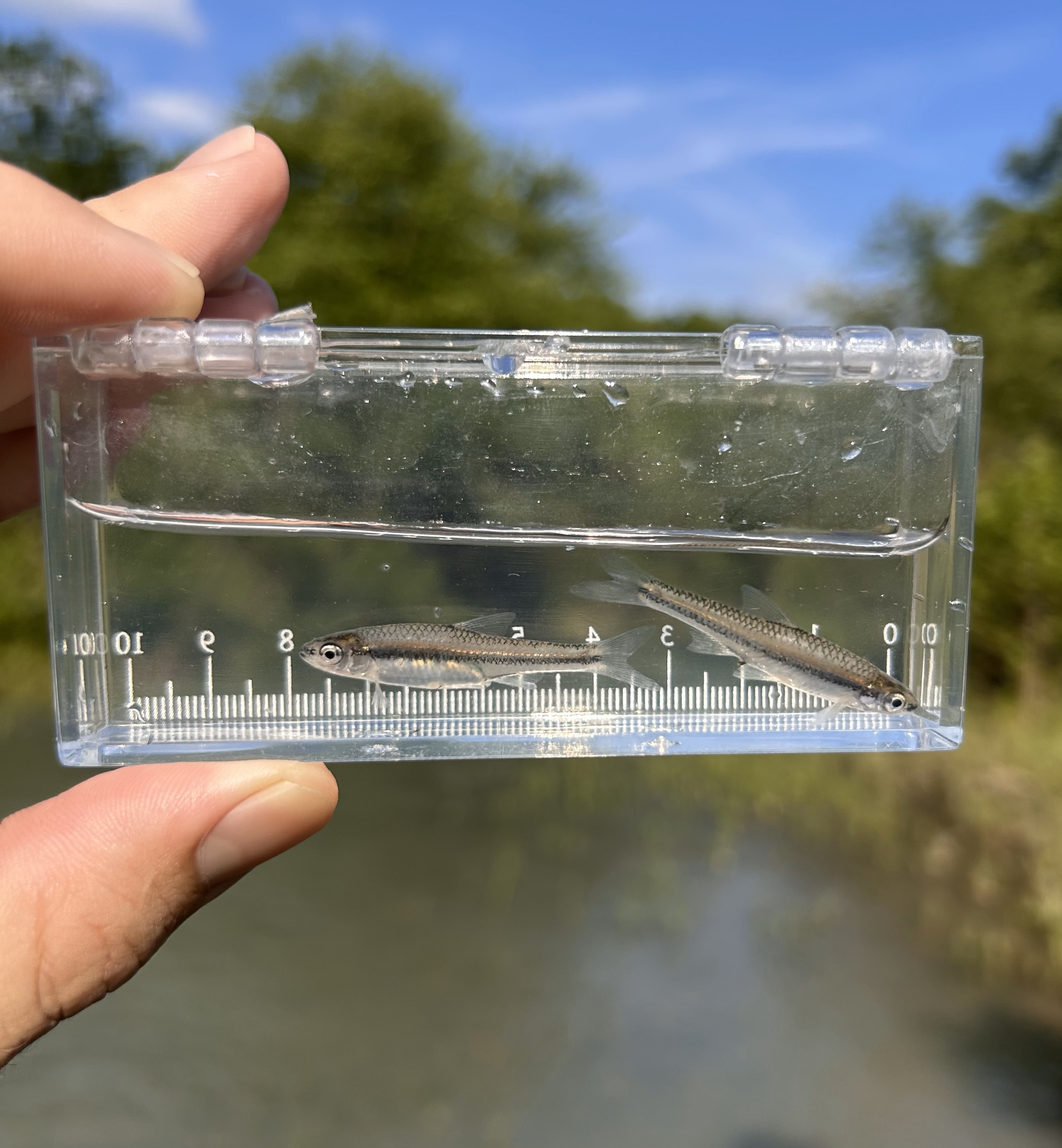
Kiamichi shiner from the Black Fork Fourche LaFave River, Scott County, Arkansas

Kiamichi shiner (Miniellus ortenburgeri) is a species of freshwater ray-finned fish belonging to the family Leuciscidae, the shiners, daces and minnows. It is native to the United States, where it is known only from Arkansas and Oklahoma.

This species is a member of genus Miniellus, fish known commonly as eastern shiners. It was first described from the Mountain Fork River in Oklahoma. Today it is known from a few river systems in Oklahoma and Arkansas, including the drainages of the Arkansas, Ouachita, and Red Rivers. About half of the specimens collected have come from the Kiamichi River. It has no official conservation status, but in a 2005 survey of its current distribution it was suggested that the fish be considered a "vulnerable" species.

This is a slender fish with a silvery color reaching about 5.5 centimeters in maximum length.

The known habitat types of the fish include quiet pools with clear water in creeks and rivers, usually with rocky substrates. It may be found with other fish species such as the striped shiner (Luxilus chrysocephalus), brook silverside (Labidesthes sicculus), blackspotted topminnow (Fundulus olivaceus), longear sunfish (Lepomis megalotis), smallmouth bass (Micropterus dolomieu), and greenside darter (Etheostoma blennioides).
