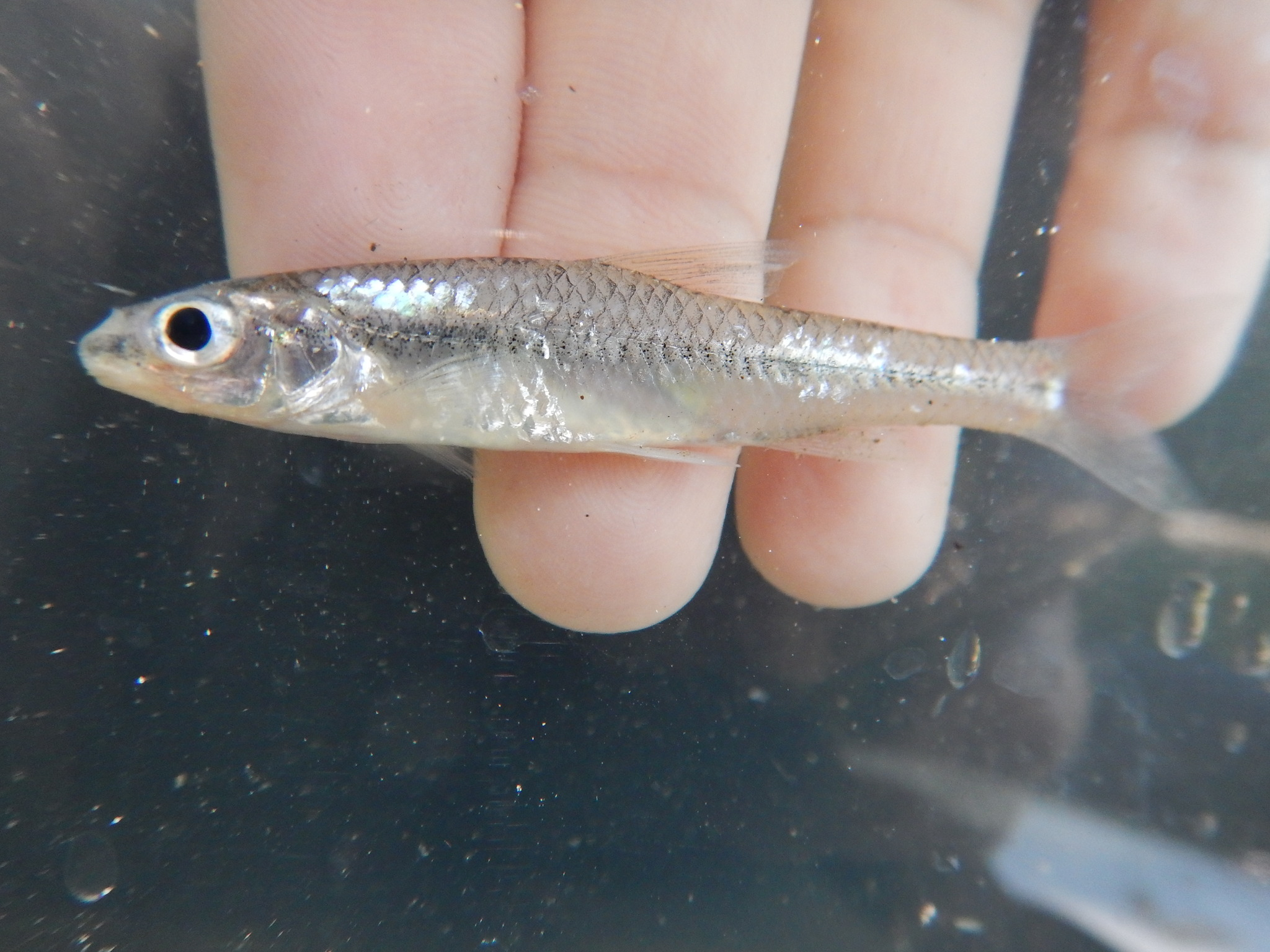

Conservation status
- Least Concern (IUCN 3.1)

- Apparently Secure (NatureServe)

Scientific classification
- Kingdom: Animalia
- Phylum: Chordata
- Class: Actinopterygii
- Order: Cypriniformes
- Family: Leuciscidae
- Subfamily: Pogonichthyinae
- Genus: Hybopsis
- Species: H. amnis

Binomial name
- Hybopsis amnis (C. L. Hubbs & Greene, 1951)
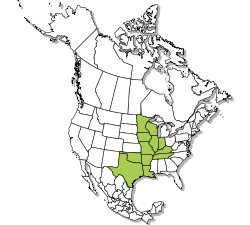
- Distribution of the pallid shiner fish in United States

Synonyms
- Notropis amnis Hubbs & Greene, 1951; Notropis phenacobius Forbes, 1885: Notropis nocomis Evermann, 1892; Notropis pinnosa amnis C. L. Hubbs & Bonham, 1951

= Pallid shiner =

Species of fish

The pallid shiner (Hybopsis amnis) is a species of freshwater ray-finned fish belonging to the family Leuciscidae, the shiners, daces and minnows. Its synonym is Notropis amnis. They are native to North America and can be found in the Mississippi watershed. The pallid shiner is considered a rare fish in its northern distribution but not in its southern distribution. The pallid shiner was first discovered in the early 1900s in the St. Croix River north of Taylors Falls, and its population has been declining since. Little is known about their feeding and reproductive habits.

== Physical description ==
The pallid shiner is a small silver fish with very little pigmentation on its fusiform body and like most fishes, it is laterally flattened. The only marking on its body is a thin lateral stripe that extends from its head to its tail. The scales on its body are composed of round lateral scales called cycloid scales. It has a slightly subterminal mouth and no adipose fin. Like other members of the family Cyprinidae, the pallid shiner is a toothless fish and has no stomach. Instead they chew their food using gill rakers on their gills and pharyngeal teeth. Its caudal fin is white and is forked with pointed tips. The dorsal fin of the pallid shiner is high and has eight soft rays. The pelvic fins are abdominal.

== Geographic distribution ==
Today the pallid shiner can be found in the Mississippi river basin from southern Wisconsin and Minnesota to Louisiana. Specifically its distribution is from the Mississippi valley north to the St. Croix river in Minnesota and Wisconsin. Its southern distribution is to the Amite river in Louisiana and west to the Guadalupe river in Texas. The pallid shiner is very rare in its northern distribution and there are more abundant populations in its southern distribution. Historically the pallid shiner was abundant in the state of Missouri, but the populations there declined greatly.

== Habitat ==
As mentioned before, the pallid shiner is distributed in many rivers. These rivers are typically medium to large rivers. They can also be found more downstream of sand and gravel bars in streams. Pallid shiners prefer slow moving waters and quiet waters over sand and silty bottoms. Because of increased human activity in the rivers that they are found, sedimentation has become more of a problem for the pallid shiners.

== Conservation status ==
The pallid shiner is listed as least concern because, although its distribution and abundance have been reduced, the number of subpopulations and populations are still relatively large and have not declined greatly. Until recently the pallid shiner was thought to have become regionally extinct in Illinois, but was then rediscovered in the Kankakee River. It has been affected by sedimentation and increased human activity in the rivers that it is found in.
