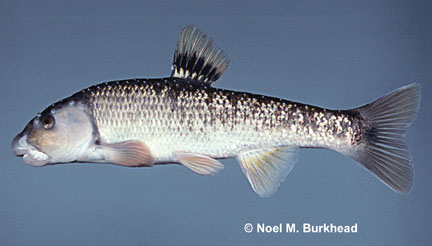

Conservation status
- Least Concern (IUCN 3.1)

- Secure (NatureServe)

Scientific classification
- Kingdom: Animalia
- Phylum: Chordata
- Class: Actinopterygii
- Order: Cypriniformes
- Family: Leuciscidae
- Subfamily: Pogonichthyinae
- Genus: Campostoma
- Species: C. oligolepis

Binomial name
- Campostoma oligolepis C. L. Hubbs & Greene, 1935

Synonyms
- Campostoma anomalum oligolepis C. L. Hubbs & Greene, 1935; Leuciscus prolixus Storer, 1845

= Largescale stoneroller =

Species of fish

The largescale stoneroller (Campostoma oligolepis) is a species of freshwater ray-finned fish in the family Leuciscidae, the shiners, daces and minnows. This fish is found in the eastern United States.

== Geographic distribution ==
The largescale stoneroller is found natively in many of North American streams, rivers, lakes, and creeks. It is native to the Upper Mississippi River and Lake Michigan drainages of Wisconsin, eastern Minnesota, eastern Iowa, and northern Illinois; Ozarkian streams of central and southern Missouri, and northern Arkansas; Mobile Bay drainage, Georgia, Alabama, and eastern Mississippi; parts of Green, Cumberland, and Tennessee River drainages of Kentucky, Tennessee, Georgia, and Alabama It has also been introduced into other areas in North America like the Illinois River in Oklahoma. It is thought that the reason for their introduction into the Oklahoma is due to the fact that it is a popular baitfish, and has effects on this area in ways that have not been noticed by scientist and researchers. The largescale stoneroller ranges from Alabama to Oklahoma.

== Ecology ==
The largescale stoneroller inhabits well-oxygenated waters with temperatures around 46–32 °F (8–0 °C), with low turbulence and a reduced flow of water. It prefers upland habitats above the Fall Line. It is a herbivorous fish which eats diatoms, green algae, and blue-green bacteria, with a tendency to ingest less sand and silt than the central stoneroller. The largescale stoneroller's predators include large and smallmouth bass, the spotted bass, sauger, and the walleye. It is a popular baitfish so anglers also catch them for fishing. The largescale stoneroller can tolerate waters that are polluted and therefore it does not have many competing species.

== Life cycle ==
Largescale stoneroller generally reach sexual maturity at one to four years of age. The breeding process starts with the males constructing the nest in gravel bars and rocks in the late winter. The females then come in the spring and lay the eggs while the males fertilize them. A female can lay anywhere from four hundred to four thousand eggs at one time. After breeding, both male and female leave the nest unattended and let the fry hatch and fend for themselves. The fry stay together and form a school and eat and protect one another. The largescale stoneroller has a life expectancy of around five years.

== Management ==
The largescale stoneroller is not currently on the federal/ state endangered or threatened list. It was discovered in the Illinois River in Oklahoma (middle Arkansas drainage) and may have been introduced there Even though it was introduced there it still has to show any kind of positive or negative effect on the biotic and a biotic life in that area.
