= Chub shiner =

Conservation status
- Least Concern (IUCN 3.1)

Scientific classification
- Kingdom: Animalia
- Phylum: Chordata
- Class: Actinopterygii
- Order: Cypriniformes
- Family: Leuciscidae
- Subfamily: Pogonichthyinae
- Genus: Alburnops
- Species: A. potteri

Binomial name
- Alburnops potteri C. L. Hubbs & Bonham, 1951

Synonyms
- Notropis potteri C. L. Hubbs & Bonham, 1951

Species of fish

The chub shiner (Alburnops potteri) is a species of freshwater ray-finned fish in the family Leuciscidae, the shiners, daces and minnows. This fish is found in the Brazos River drainage of Texas and Red River drainage of Texas, Oklahoma, Arkansas, and Louisiana. It is also found in limited areas of the Mississippi River in Louisiana, and in lower parts of the Colorado River and Galveston Bay drainages.
