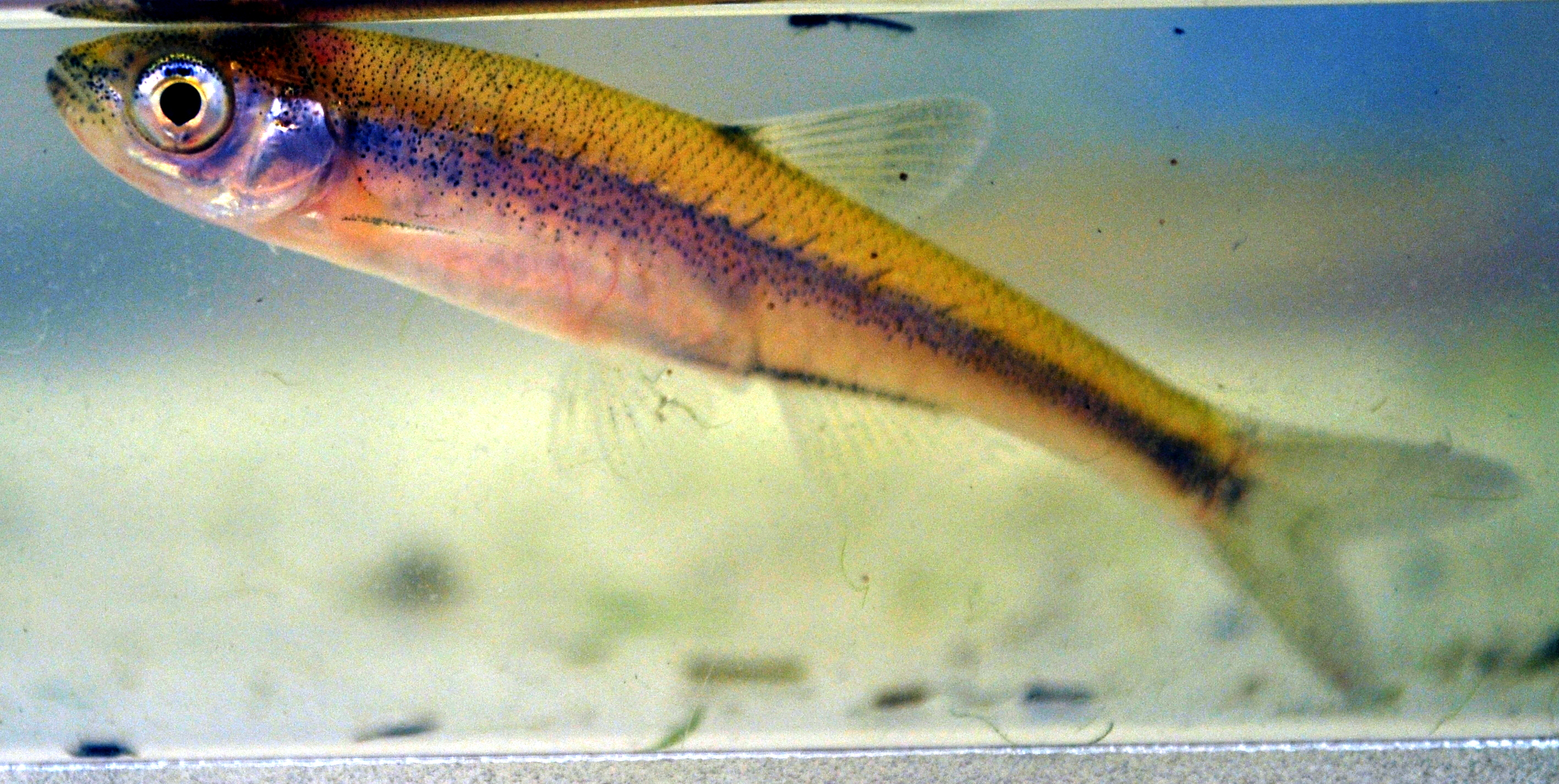
- Juvenile

Conservation status
- Least Concern (IUCN 3.1)

Scientific classification
- Kingdom: Animalia
- Phylum: Chordata
- Class: Actinopterygii
- Order: Cypriniformes
- Family: Leuciscidae
- Subfamily: Pogonichthyinae
- Genus: Miniellus
- Species: M. boops

Binomial name
- Miniellus boops (C. H. Gilbert, 1884)

Synonyms
- Notropis boops Gilbert, 1884

= Bigeye shiner =

Species of fish

The bigeye shiner (Notropis boops) is a species of freshwater ray-finned fish belonging to the family Leuciscidae, the shiners, daces and minnows. This fish is a slender, silvery minnow with a dusky lateral stripe and a maximum total length of about 80 mm (3.1 in). Its distinct characteristic is its large-diameter eyes. It is a common species in upland streams of the middle Mississippi River system. Bigeye shiners prefer warm, quiet pools with clear water and silt-free substrates. Siltation, channelization, and gravel dredging are all threats to bigeye shiner populations. During spawning season, typically late April to August, bigeye shiners have several clutches of eggs. State agencies and the EPA have both played a role in the surveying of bigeye shiner populations. Populations have decreased in Ohio due mostly to habitat destruction. In addition to habitat destruction by humans, habitat alteration of the small streams and dried pools has also had a significant effect on abundance. Rivers and streams should not be channelized or modified in any way, which is becoming an increasingly popular trend in urban locations. Agricultural areas and properties within the watershed should adhere to regulations to prevent runoff into the streams.

== Distribution ==
The bigeye shiner is a common species in upland streams of the middle Mississippi River system, including the eastern highlands of Kentucky, Tennessee, and northern Alabama, the Ozark and Ouachita highlands of Missouri, Arkansas, and Oklahoma, and subhighland regions of northern Louisiana and southeastern Kansas. In Ohio, siltation of stream bottoms and higher water turbidity that accompanied agricultural development of the lowland parts of the state may have eliminated remaining relict populations and threatened established, larger populations. Dams also can separate populations and ultimately fragment the habitat to where a population can no longer survive. Dams are also responsible for temperature and flow variability, sediment accumulation, and altered dissolved oxygen. Overall, habitat fragmentation and destruction are responsible for the extirpation of Notropis boops in many waterways.

== Ecology ==
Bigeye shiners inhabit flowing, usually clear and rocky, pools of creeks and small to medium rivers. The benthic environment includes a substrate of gravel, rock, or sand. They are often found near emergent vegetation along the stream margin. Higher-gradient streams are typically ideal because they carry silt out of pools more efficiently than low-gradient streams. Being benthopelagic, the bigeye shiner lives and feeds near both the bottom of the river and near the surface. The bigeye shiner is a sight feeder; it preys mostly on small insects hovering at the water surface. It also preys on small aquatic invertebrates. Because the bigeye shiner relies on sight to find prey, the water quality is important. Turbidity and siltation are major threats to their success.

== Life history ==
Most of these fish spawn during their second summer, with only a few surviving to spawn the following season. Egg diameter frequencies suggest that individuals spawn more than one clutch per season. Several variables play a role in when the spawning season occurs for N. boops. Temperature and rainfall are both the major contributing factors to their reproductive cycles. They spawn from June into August in Kansas and Missouri. Some males with breeding tubercles and females with mature eggs have been present from April into August. This occurrence is more popular in southern populations of Notropis boops. Increased sediment from agricultural runoff or the installation of dams has affected their ability to successfully reproduce.

== Current management ==
Currently, very little management of the bigeye shiner is occurring. According to the IUCN Red List of Threatened Species, the species is of relatively low conservation concern and does not require significant additional protection or major management, monitoring, or research action.
