= Red River shiner =

Conservation status
- Least Concern (IUCN 3.1)

Scientific classification
- Kingdom: Animalia
- Phylum: Chordata
- Class: Actinopterygii
- Division: Teleostei
- Order: Cypriniformes
- Family: Leuciscidae
- Subfamily: Pogonichthyinae
- Genus: Notropis
- Species: N. bairdi

Binomial name
- Notropis bairdi C. L. Hubbs & Ortenburger, 1929

Species of fish

The Red River shiner (Notropis bairdi) is a species of freshwater ray-finned fish belonging to the family Leuciscidae which features the shiners, daces and minnows.

It is endemic to the United States, where it is found in the Red River in Arkansas, Oklahoma, and Texas.
