= Cardinal shiner =

Conservation status
- Least Concern (IUCN 3.1)

Scientific classification
- Kingdom: Animalia
- Phylum: Chordata
- Class: Actinopterygii
- Order: Cypriniformes
- Family: Leuciscidae
- Genus: Luxilus
- Species: L. cardinalis

Binomial name
- Luxilus cardinalis (Mayden, 1988)

Synonyms
- Notropis cardinalis Mayden, 1988

Species of fish

The cardinal shiner (Luxilus cardinalis) is a species of freshwater ray-finned fish belonging to the family Leuciscidae, the shiners, daces and minnows. It occurs from the Arkansas River drainage in southwestern Missouri, northwestern Arkansas, eastern Kansas and eastern Oklahoma to the Red River drainage in southeastern Oklahoma, where it was probably introduced. Its preferred habitat is rocky and sandy pools and runs of headwaters, creeks and small rivers.
