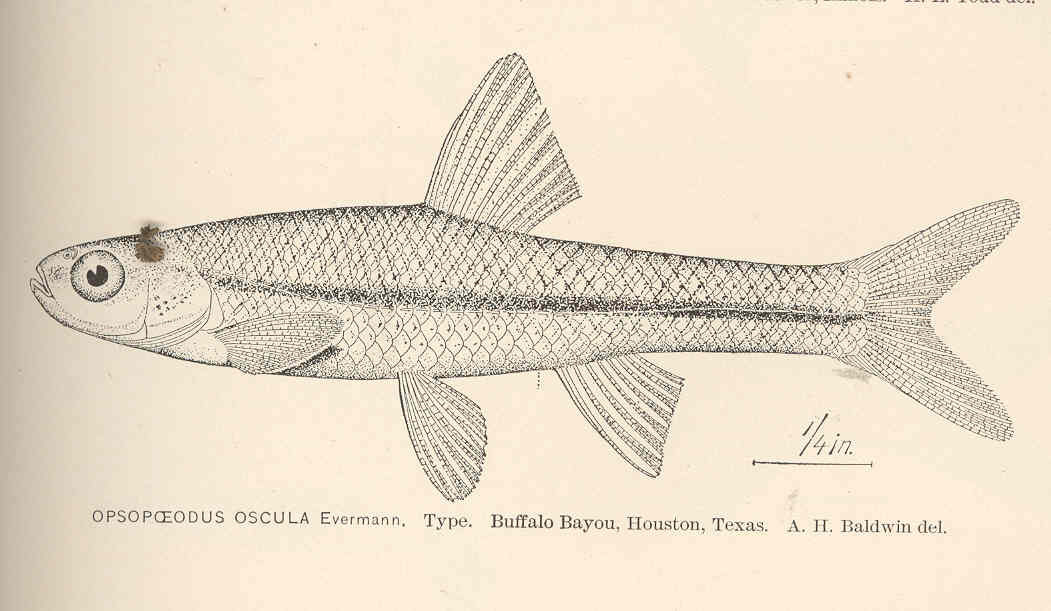

Conservation status
- Least Concern (IUCN 3.1)

- Secure (NatureServe)

Scientific classification
- Kingdom: Animalia
- Phylum: Chordata
- Class: Actinopterygii
- Order: Cypriniformes
- Family: Leuciscidae
- Subfamily: Leuciscinae
- Genus: Opsopoeodus; O. P. Hay, 1881
- Species: O. emiliae

Binomial name
- Opsopoeodus emiliae O. P. Hay, 1881

Synonyms
- Notropis emiliae (Hay, 1881); Trycherodon megalops Forbes, 1883; Opsopoeodus osculus Evermann, 1892

= Pugnose minnow =

Species of fish

The pugnose minnow (Opsopoeodus emiliae) is a species of cyprinid fish found in the eastern North America. There are two recognized subspecies with the subspecies from Florida recognized as race peninsularis.

== Subspecies ==
- Opsopoeodus emiliae emiliae O. P. Hay, 1881 (Pugnose minnow)
- Opsopoeodus emiliae peninsularis (C. R. Gilbert & R. M. Bailey, 1972)

== Description ==
The pugnose minnow has an average lifespan of 3 years. The pugnose minnow eats mostly insects but will occasionally eat algae by accident. If insects are not present, pugnose minnows can be found eating the eggs from other fish or small aquatic crustaceans like brine shrimp.

The pugnose minnow is a small silver fish with an average length of 1–2 inches (2.5–5.1 cm) with some reaching 2.5 inches (6.4 cm) in length; the minnow has a forked tail, short pectoral fins, and a small rounded snout. The distinctive characteristic is the lateral line running from the tail all the way to the mouth. The pugnose minnow has a greatly superior mouth, indicating that they feed above them in the water column. The dorsal fin has 9 dorsal spines and is translucent, as well as the caudal fin. The base of the caudal fin has a black spot that becomes pronounced in males when they are ready to mate; breeding males can also have tubercles that are used for fighting to show dominance and to be accepted by a female.

== Habitat ==
The pugnose minnow is a freshwater fish that is native to Canada and the United States, mostly along the Eastern sides of these countries. It can be found in clear waters but also slow, turbid waters with plenty of debris to hide under. In the United States it is found in many different types of water, some stay in the clear water in which they were hatched but some may swim further from where they hatched to an environment with much more silt and clay.

== Reproduction ==
Pugnose minnows reproduce in late spring to early summer under debris that can be found in their habitat, especially under rocks or logs. Males will clear out the area under the rock and defend it from other males by using the tubercles found on their snout. The female has to be led to the potential male's site and will investigate it as the male nudges her repeatedly with his dorsal fin to stimulate egg spawning. Female pugnose minnows lay adhesive eggs that will stick to the underside of the rock; the eggs will be laid either individually or in strings, with approximately 120 eggs per clutch. Males and females will repeat this process over the next 6 or 7 days. After all the eggs have been laid, the female has nothing else to do with the offspring; the males will guard the eggs until they hatch, which is around 6 days, depending on the weather.
