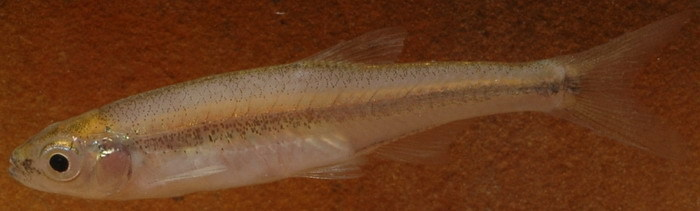

Conservation status
- Least Concern (IUCN 3.1)

Scientific classification
- Kingdom: Animalia
- Phylum: Chordata
- Class: Actinopterygii
- Division: Teleostei
- Order: Cypriniformes
- Family: Leuciscidae
- Subfamily: Pogonichthyinae
- Genus: Lythrurus
- Species: L. fumeus

Binomial name
- Lythrurus fumeus (Evermann, 1892)

Synonyms
- Notropis fumeus Evermann, 1892

= Ribbon shiner =

Species of fish

The ribbon shiner (Lythrurus fumeus) is a species of freshwater ray-finned fishes belonging to the family Leuciscidae, the shiners, daces and minnows. This fish is native to the United States.

== Description ==
The ribbon shiner belongs to the family Cyprinidae. L. fumeus has a short snout that is rounded with a relatively large terminal mouth. The head is short with large eyes, and the diameter of the eye is greater than the length of the snout. The body is moderately deep, elongated, and laterally compressed. Its dorsal fin lacks the prominent black spot. The dorsal surface of the fish is typically an olive or straw color that has a silver overlay, and there is a dusky strip along its back. The ventral surface is a silvery white, and has a silver-black strip along its side. There are more than 21 predorsal scale rows, the scales are small, and there are 10–12 anal rays. The maximum length is 55 mm (2.16 inches).

== Diet ==
Ribbon shiners school in mid or surface waters. In the wet season, 64% of their prey comes from the surface, while 34% of their diet comes from benthic animals. During the dry season, when the feeding conditions are unfavorable, 37% of their diet comes from the surface, and 8%-21% comes from midwater and benthic animals.

== Habitat ==
The ribbon shiners are commonly found in small to moderate sized calm streams. The streams can be clear to cloudy, and the sediment can range for sand, mud, clay, silt, or detritus.

== Reproduction and life cycle ==
Ribbon shiners spawn during the late spring or summer. The breeding colors of the males is yellow, and there is no sexual dimorphism in adult sizes. They are broadcast spawners. There is currently no information about the age of maturation.

== Distribution ==
The ribbon shiner is located in Gulf drainages from Lake Pontchartrain (Louisiana) to the Navidad River (Texas), and they are located in all drainage systems of Lake Pontchartrain, but excluding the Tangipahoa. They are also native to the Mississippi River Basin, from the lower Mississippi drainages to the Tennessee drainages, Central Illinois, southwestern Indiana, eastern Oklahoma, western Kentucky, to northwestern Alabama, and mostly fall below Fall Line but extends above in the Arkansas River drainage.

== Etymology ==
Lythrurus fumeus means smoky red tail, with Lythrurus coming from the Greek lythron and oura, respectively meaning "blood" and "tail", whereas fumeus is Latin for smoky.
