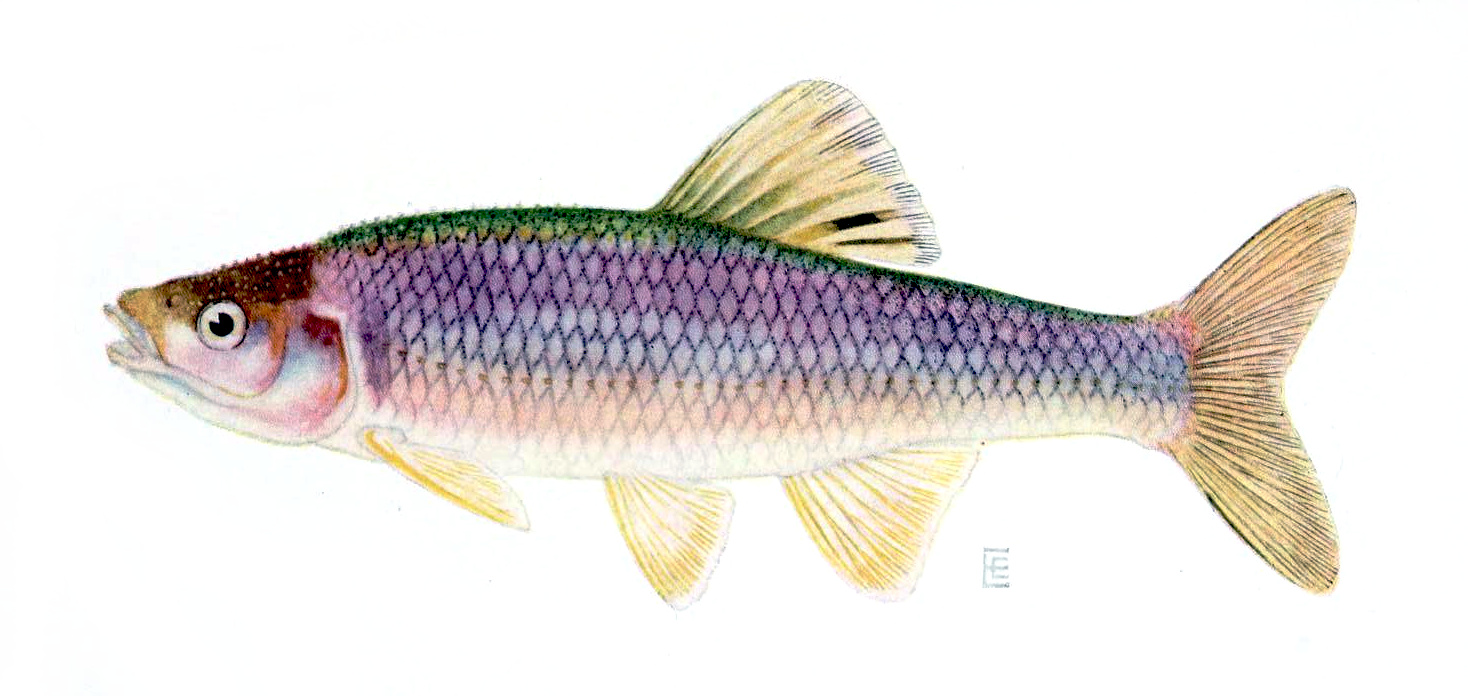

Conservation status
- Least Concern (IUCN 3.1)

Scientific classification
- Kingdom: Animalia
- Phylum: Chordata
- Class: Actinopterygii
- Order: Cypriniformes
- Family: Leuciscidae
- Subfamily: Pogonichthyinae
- Genus: Cyprinella
- Species: C. whipplei

Binomial name
- Cyprinella whipplei Girard, 1856

Synonyms
- Notropis whipplei (Girard, 1856)

= Cyprinella whipplei =

Species of fish

Cyprinella whipplei, the steelcolor shiner, is a species of freshwater ray-finned fish in the family Leuciscidae, the shiners, daces and minnows. This species found in North America. It is common throughout the Mississippi River basin and in the Black Warrior River system in Alabama.

Adults may reach a maximum size of 16 cm (6.3 in) while mean length is 8.8 cm (3.5 in). The maximum age reported in this species was three years. C. whipplei lives in schools on rocky or sandy floors of creeks and small rivers.

The fish was named in honor of Lieut. Amiel Weeks Whipple (1818–1863), the military engineer/surveyor who led the boundary survey team that collected the type specimen.
