= Bluntface shiner =

Conservation status
- Least Concern (IUCN 3.1)

Scientific classification
- Kingdom: Animalia
- Phylum: Chordata
- Class: Actinopterygii
- Order: Cypriniformes
- Family: Leuciscidae
- Subfamily: Pogonichthyinae
- Genus: Cyprinella
- Species: C. camura

Binomial name
- Cyprinella camura (D. S. Jordan & Meek, 1884)

Synonyms
- Ciola camura Jordan & Meek, 1884; Notropis camurus (Jordan & Meek, 1884)

Species of fish

The bluntface shiner (Cyprinella camura) is a species of freshwater ray-finned fish in the family Leuciscidae, the shiners, daces and minnows. It is native to the United States, where it occurs in two disjunct populations on either side of the Mississippi River. It is a common fish in its range, even abundant in some localities.

The fish reaches a maximum length of about 15 centimeters. It lives in creeks, rivers, and pools.
