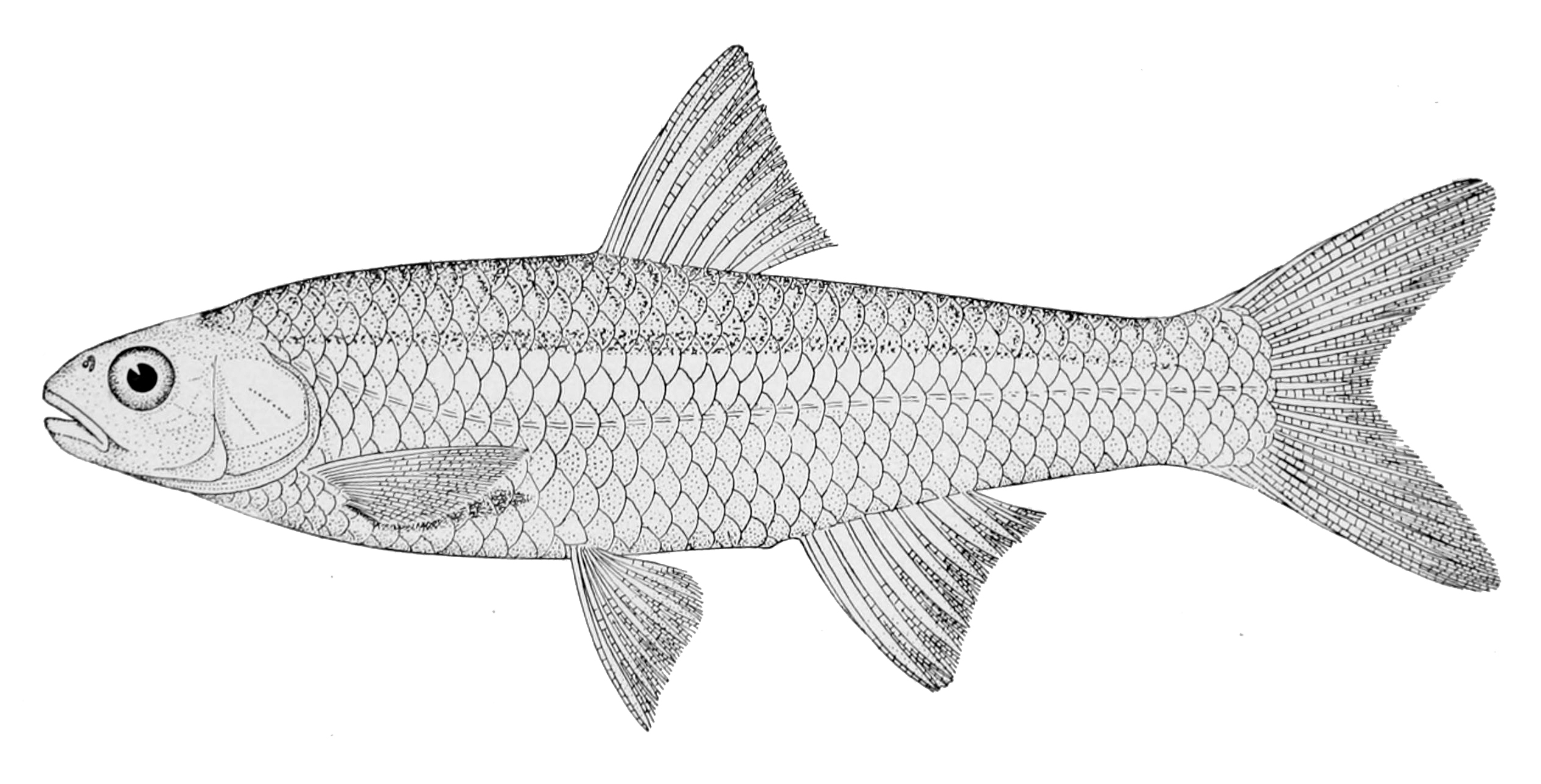

Conservation status
- Least Concern (IUCN 3.1)

Scientific classification
- Kingdom: Animalia
- Phylum: Chordata
- Class: Actinopterygii
- Order: Cypriniformes
- Family: Leuciscidae
- Subfamily: Pogonichthyinae
- Genus: Paranotropis
- Species: P. shumardi

Binomial name
- Paranotropis shumardi (Girard, 1856)

Synonyms
- Alburnops shumardi Girard, 1856; Notropis shumardi (Girard, 1856); Alburnops illecebrosus Girard, 1856; Notropis chamberlaini Evermann, 1898; Notropis brazosensis Hubbs & Bonham, 1951

= Silverband shiner =

Species of fish

The silverband shiner (Paranotropis shumardi) is a species of freshwater ray-finned fish beloinging to the family Leuciscidae, the shiners, daces and minnows. It is endemic to the United States, where it is found in the Mississippi River and main tributaries in lower Ohio, Arkansas, Louisiana to Illinois and South Dakota, and several Gulf slope drainages.
