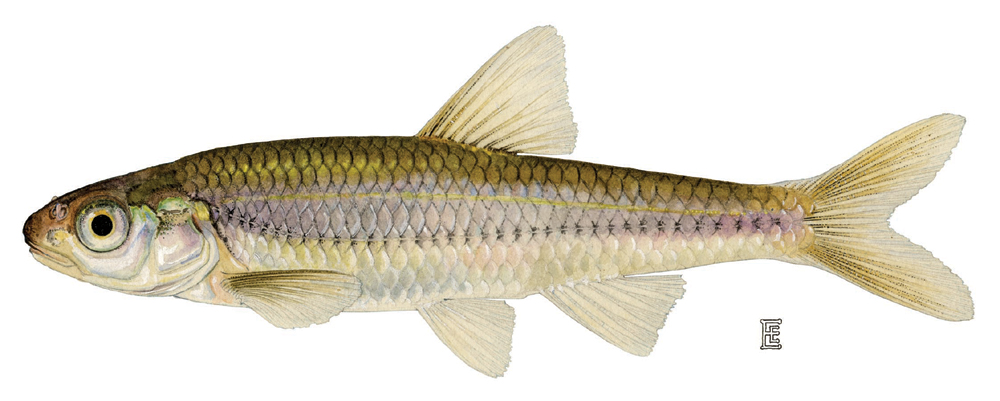

Conservation status
- Least Concern (IUCN 3.1)

Scientific classification
- Kingdom: Animalia
- Phylum: Chordata
- Class: Actinopterygii
- Division: Teleostei
- Order: Cypriniformes
- Family: Leuciscidae
- Subfamily: Pogonichthyinae
- Genus: Miniellus
- Species: M. stramineus

Binomial name
- Miniellus stramineus (Cope, 1865)

Synonyms
- Hybognathus stramineus Cope, 1865; Notropis stramineus (Cope, 1865); Cyprinella ludibunda Girard, 1856; Notropis ludibundus (Girard, 1856); Alburnus lineolatus Putnam, 1863; Hybopsis missurensis Cope, 1871; Hybopsis scylla Cope, 1871; Cliola chlora D. S. Jordan, 1878; Notropis reticulatus C. H. Eigenmann & R. S. Eigenmann, 1893

= Sand shiner =

Species of fish

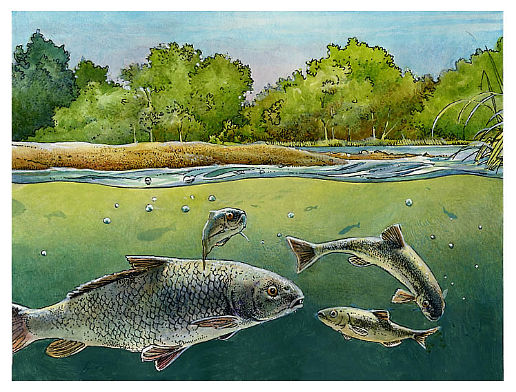
Fish in the Missouri National Recreational River area inc. sand shiners

The sand shiner (Miniellus stramineus) is a species of freshwater ray-finned fish belonging to the family Leuciscidae, the shiners, daces and minnows. Sand shiners live in open clear water streams with sandy bottoms where they feed in schools on aquatic and terrestrial insects, bottom ooze and diatoms.

== Distribution ==
The sand shiner is extremely widespread, known from central part of the United States and southern Canada. The range stretches from Saint Lawrence-Great Lakes, Hudson Bay and Mississippi River basins which are part of the St. Lawrence River in Quebec to Saskatchewan in Canada. The range also stretches south to Tennessee and Texas; west to Montana, Wyoming, Colorado and New Mexico; Trinity River to Rio Grande in Texas and New Mexico, and Mexico.

== Name ==
The specific epithet stramineus means of straw, making reference to the fish's overall pale amber body color. Notropis ludibundus is a senior synonym of M. stramineus, however, the specific name M. stramineus is conserved and N. ludibundus is suppressed.

== Physical characteristics ==
Sand shiners have a compressed, slender body covered in leptoid scales, more specifically cycloid scales which are generally round and lack a tooth-like cteni. They have a subterminal mouth position (the end of the snout projects only slightly past the mouth) and a homocercal tail (the vertebral column does not enter the caudal fin). Sand Shiners usually have seven anal soft rays, fewer than 10 dorsal fin soft rays, and fewer than 45 lateral line scales. They have no spinous rays meaning none of their rays are hard. Their pharyngeal teeth count is 0,4-4,0. The average total length of a Sand Shiner is about 44 mm with a maximum length of approximately 82 mm. They have a silvery head and sides with a dark middorsal strip extending to the dorsal fin. At the base of the dorsal fin are two distinct black dashes separated by a clear space when viewed from above. Their back scales are an olivaceous color and are outlined with melanophores. Each pore within the lateral line system, is also accented with paired melanophores which creates the appearance of a thin midlateral strip. The abdomen is a whitish color with indistinct spots at the base of the caudal fin. During spawning, colors intensify in males.

== Habitat ==
The sand shiner requires clear water with a sandy, gravel-rubble bottom in order to survive. It is irregularly distributed amongst streams of diverse sizes and inhabits a wide variety of habitats within the medium to large streams and rivers but is rarely found in upland areas. Sand Shiners tend to seek areas deeper than 20 cm which have little to no aquatic vegetation and a slow-moving current. Habitats with acidic or alkaline conditions are avoided, however, in the Southwest, pH values of around 8.0 are common in streams which Sand Shiners occupy. Habitat locations change slightly throughout the seasons. During spawning season in August, sand shiners form large schools in shallow water which has a slight current and a sandy bottom. In the fall, concentrations of sand shiners are found in deep pools. In late summer and fall, the sand shiners tend to move into shallow water over a rubble bottom during dusk.

== Diet and feeding behavior ==
Sand shiners are omnivorous fish, feeding on aquatic and terrestrial insects, bottom ooze and diatoms and are often observed in large schools which frequently feeding in shallow waters. Overall, this species is an opportunistic feeder primarily taking bottom particulate matter, as well as plant material and terrestrial and aquatic insects. More explicitly, their summer diet consists of bottom ooze (68% of volume), aquatic nymphs and larvae, Ephemeroptera nymphs, Tricoptera larvae, adult terrestrial insects, adult and emerging Ephemeroptera, dipterans, corixids, and a small amount of plant matter. During late summer, sand shiners show more surface-oriented feeding behaviors, feeding on adult aquatic and terrestrial insects. These feeding habits are similar to the closely related Cape Fear shiner and swallowtail shiner.

== Conservation status ==
Populations of sand shiners in the southern United States are currently stable. They are not listed as endangered by the federal government or any state governments. The state of New Mexico provides limited protection as precipitous decline in Pecos River may becoming a potential threat. This decline is partially as a consequence of water management practices.

== Reproduction ==
The total reproductive period of sand shiners extends from May or June through August with slight variation in time of spawning depending upon latitude. The peak of activity occurs in July and August when water temperature is high (27– 37°C ) and there is minimal rain and runoff allowing for lower water levels. Summerfelt and Minckley hypothesis spawning during the hot-dry portion of the summer is adaptive for survival as it may enhance the survival of the young. The sand shiner is a broadcast spawner that lays demersal, adhesive eggs, suggesting that the sand shiners spawning is not correlated with flow spikes. Eggs are laid in shallow water over sandy substrate in which the eggs rapidly settle to and attach to loose gravel, failing to become buoyant. Following hatching, most growth is achieved during the first year of life. A length of 10.5 mm has been reported for the size of the sand shiner at time of scale formation. Once fish reach age I or II, spawning can occur with the former being more numerous. Fecundity varies from 150 to 1,000 eggs per female per year. There is an increase in fecundity with standard length (or age) of the fish. Egg diameter ranges from 0.75 to 0.95 mm. On average, the sand shiner has a longevity of three summers.
