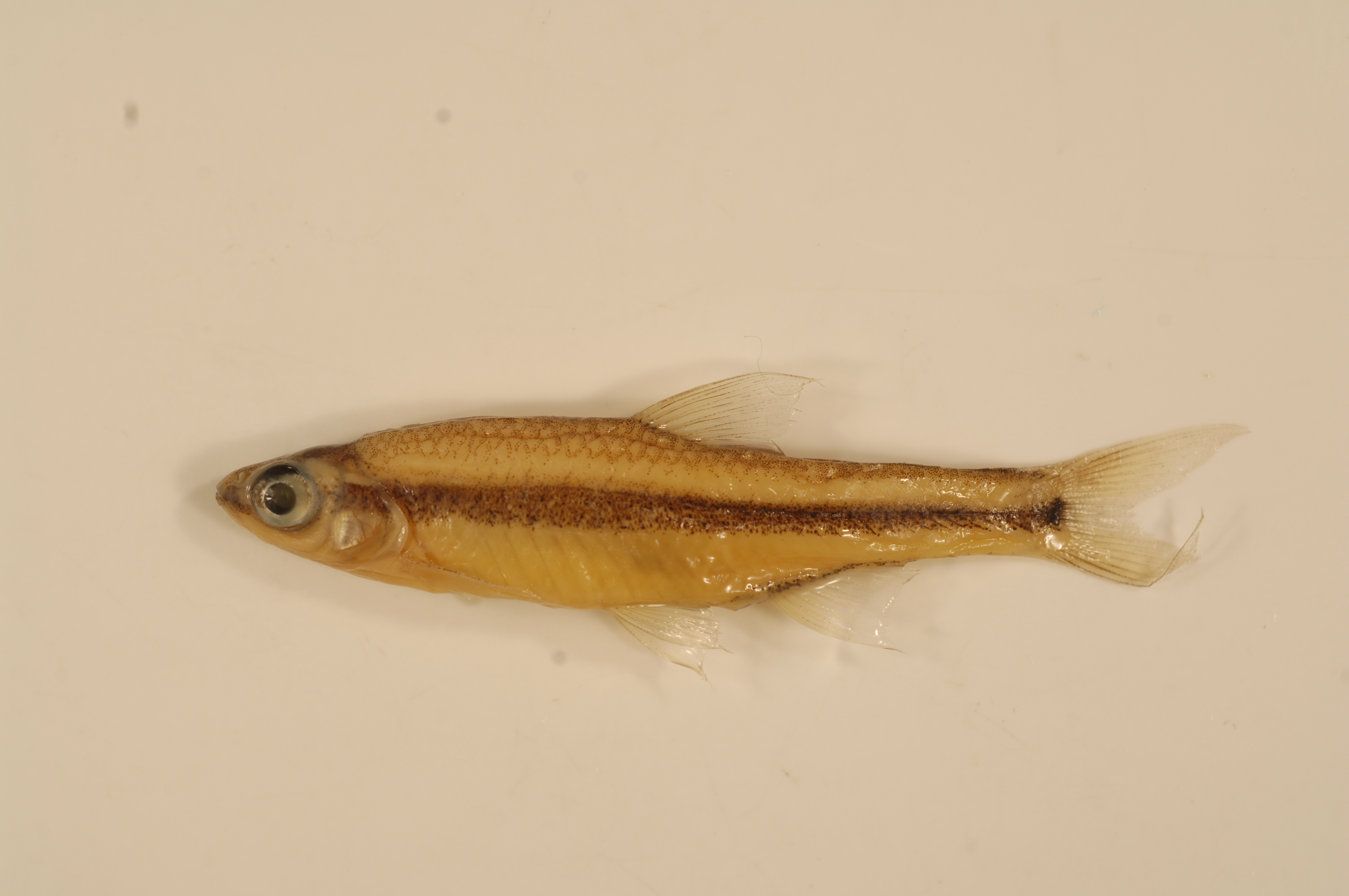

Conservation status
- Least Concern (IUCN 3.1)

- Apparently Secure (NatureServe)

Scientific classification
- Kingdom: Animalia
- Phylum: Chordata
- Class: Actinopterygii
- Order: Cypriniformes
- Family: Leuciscidae
- Subfamily: Pogonichthyinae
- Genus: Alburnops
- Species: A. chalybaeus

Binomial name
- Alburnops chalybaeus (Cope, 1867)

Synonyms
- Hybopsis chalybaeus Cope, 1867; Notropis chalybaeus Cope, 1867

= Ironcolor shiner =

Species of fish

The ironcolor shiner (Alburnops chalybaeus) is a species of freshwater ray-finned fish from the family Leuciscidae, the shiners, daces and minnows. It is a widespread species in streams and rivers in eastern North America.

== Description ==
The ironcolor shiner is a relatively small fish with a total length ranging from 45–65 millimetres (1.8–2.6 in). It has a yellowish back and sides with a well-defined black lateral stripe stretching from the caudal peduncle to the snout and there us some pigmentation on the chin and lips. It has a shorter snout than the width of its eye and the small mouth has a black palate. When breeding the males develop a bright orange stripe above their black lateral stripes as well as frequently having orange spots above and below the black spot on the caudal fin. The fins are almost unpigmented and lack any distinct markings but breeding males may develop orange coloration on the fins and over the body. Males also develop tiny tubercles around mouth, snout and the first few pectoral fin rays. The underside from the breast to the pectoral fin base has no scales. The lateral line has 31–36 cycloid scales which are rounded in shape.

== Distribution ==
The ironcolor shiner is endemic to the eastern United States where it occurs from New York south to Florida and west to the Mississippi Basin with outlying populations in the San Marcos River, Texas; the Illinois River drainage in Illinois and Indiana; the Cedar River in Iowa; and the Wisconsin River and Lake Winnebago drainage system in Wisconsin; and the Lake Michigan drainage of southern Michigan and northern Indiana. It has been extirpated from Iowa and once thought to be extirpated from Pennsylvania. The only existing population left in Pennsylvania is in Marshalls Creek. In South Carolina it is widespread but patchily distributed, while in New York the only known population is in the Bashakill wetlands near Port Jervis.

== Habitat ==
The ironcolor shiner is found in the pools and slow stretches of clear, oligotrophic creeks and small rivers which have sandy beds but which have well-developed submerged vegetation. They can also occur in swamps over soft substrates in Illinois. They occur in areas vegetated with plants such as bladderwort, pondweed and Elodea while the presence of sand appears to be important for spawning. They are not normally found in groundwater supplied streams but there is a relict, disjunct population in the San Marcos River basin in Texas which occurs in the spring-fed upper reaches of the river.

== Biology ==
In the northern parts of its range the ironcolor shiner spawns from mid-April into July while in Florida it starts as late as September. The males chase the females in areas with little or no current and the eggs are broadcast over the substrate and sink into the sand. They hatch after two days and the fish attain sexual maturity at one year of age. They swim in medium-sized schools made up of fish from different age classes in open water and they feed on small invertebrates. Food items recorded include small crustaceans such as amphipods, cladocerans, and ostracods;, aquatic insects including caddis fly, midge, and mayfly larvae, as well as corixids, and ants. Filamentous algae is also consumed but this is not digested.

== Conservation ==
The ironcolor shiner has a large range in the lowlands of the eastern and central United States but in the western parts of its range there are many disjunct populations and these have suffered declines and extirpations caused by stream siltation and water pollution. It has also declined in the northern parts of its range but the population in New York's Bashakill wetlands is currently stable.
