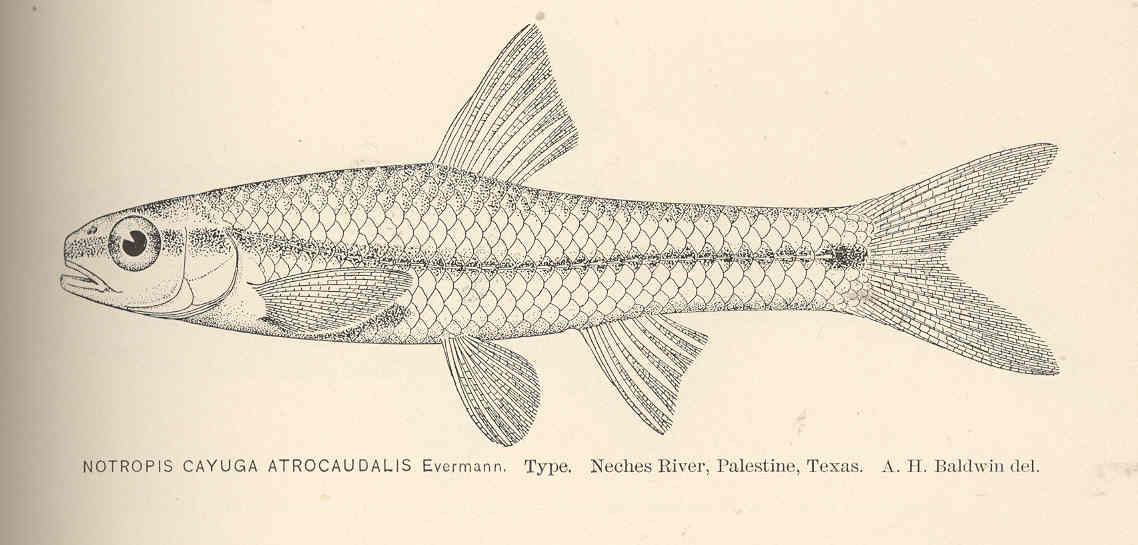

Conservation status
- Least Concern (IUCN 3.1)

Scientific classification
- Kingdom: Animalia
- Phylum: Chordata
- Class: Actinopterygii
- Order: Cypriniformes
- Family: Leuciscidae
- Subfamily: Pogonichthyinae
- Genus: Notropis
- Species: N. atrocaudalis

Binomial name
- Notropis atrocaudalis Evermann, 1892

= Blackspot shiner =

Species of fish

The blackspot shiner (Notropis atrocaudalis) is a species of freshwater ray-finned fish belonging to the family Leuciscidae, the shiners, daces and minnows. It is endemic to the United States and found in the lower Brazos River drainage of eastern Texas east to the Calcasieu River drainage of southwestern Louisiana and the Red River drainage of southeastern Oklahoma, southwestern Arkansas, and northwestern Louisiana. It grows to 7.6 cm (3.0 in) total length.
