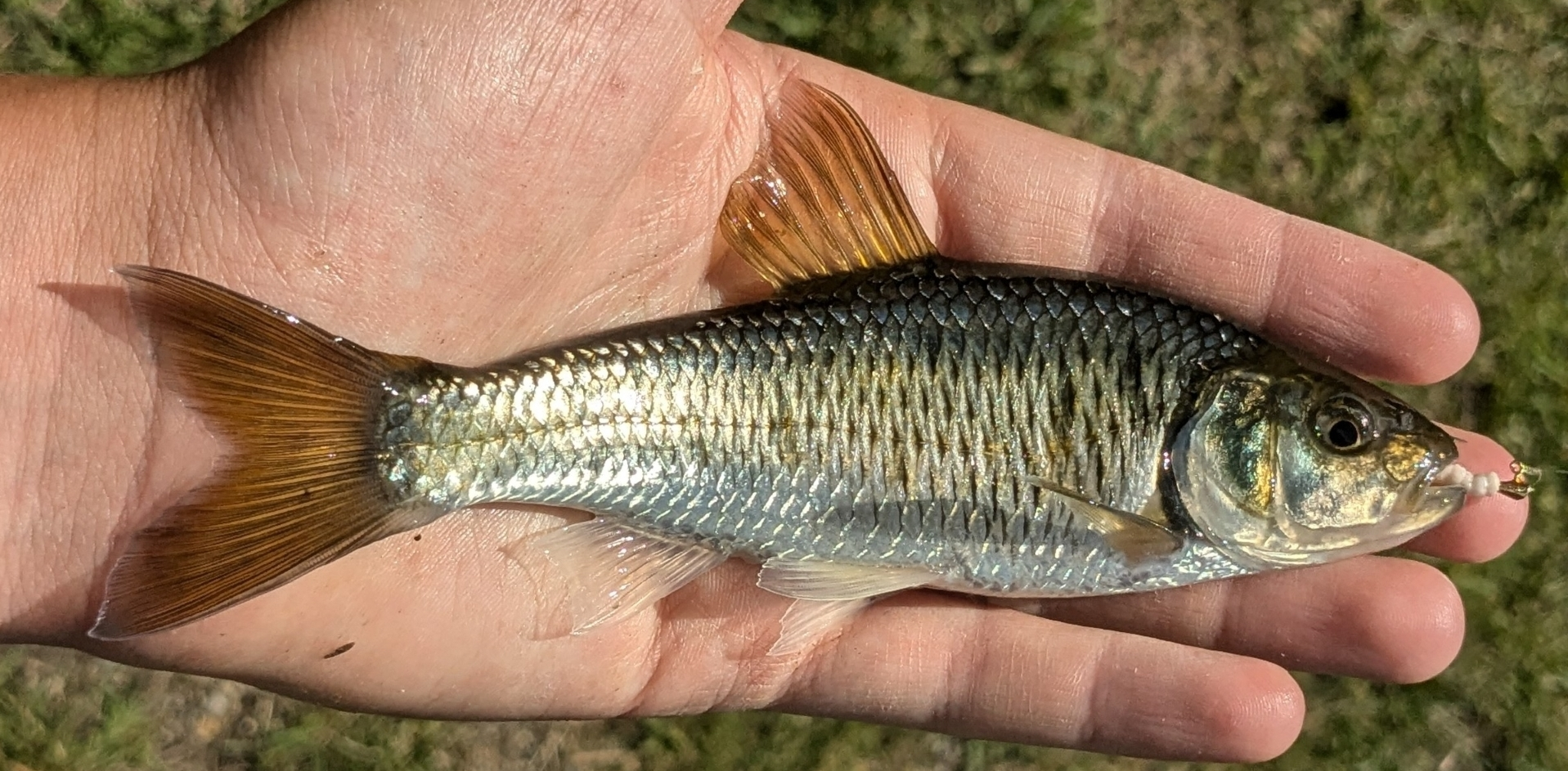
- Northern striped shiner (L. c. chrysocephalus) in Michigan

Conservation status
- Least Concern (IUCN 3.1)

Scientific classification
- Kingdom: Animalia
- Phylum: Chordata
- Class: Actinopterygii
- Division: Teleostei
- Order: Cypriniformes
- Family: Leuciscidae
- Subfamily: Pogonichthyinae
- Genus: Luxilus
- Species: L. chrysocephalus

Binomial name
- Luxilus chrysocephalus Rafinesque, 1820

Synonyms
- Notropis chrysocephalus (Rafinesque, 1820); Rutilus plargyrus Rafinesque, 1820; Leuciscus gibbosus Storer, 1845; Plargyrus typicus Girard, 1856; Hybopsis lacertosus Cope, 1868; Notropis cornutus isolepis C. L. Hubbs & D. E. S. Brown, 1927

= Striped shiner =

Species of fish

The striped shiner (Luxilus chrysocephalus) is a species of freshwater ray-finned fish belonging to the family Leuciscidae, the shiners, daces and minnows. This species is found in eastern North America.

== Description ==
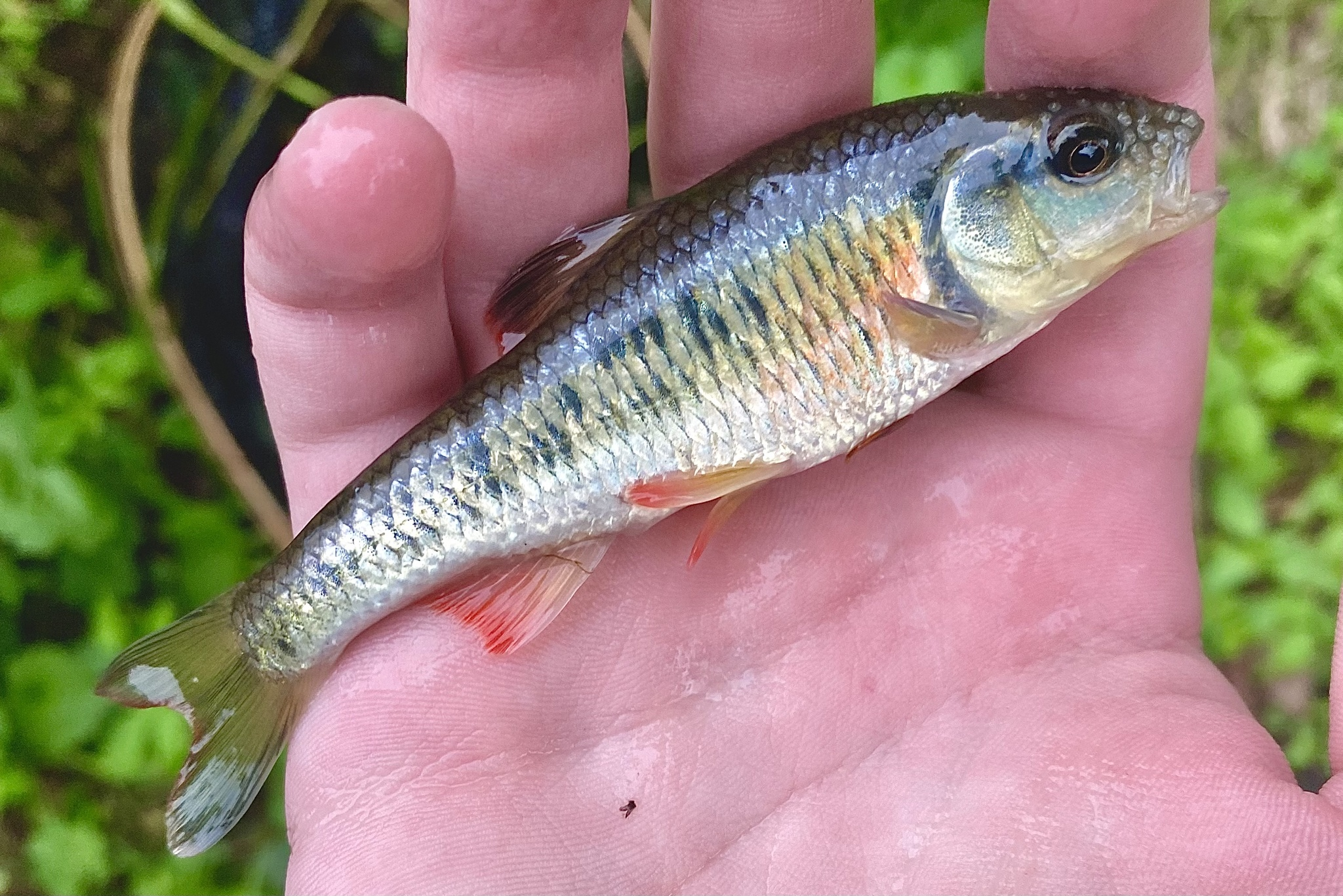
In Tennessee

The striped shiner is a silvery fish with three to four dorsolateral stripes and dark crescents on the sides. The scales and sensory pores on the snout can be outlined in black. Fins are milky to clear in color while the caudal fins have a milky base with a black or gray spot. Males can have pink snouts with areas of red or pink on the rest of the body.

Striped shiners have large, terminal mouths and may grow up to 9 inches (23 cm) in length.

== Diet ==
Striped shiners eat on a wide range of items. Mostly they feed up in the water column on a range of insects including: termites, mayflies, dragonflies, caddisflies, beetles and terrestrial midges. They also feed on the bottom materials like algae. They feed continuously day and night but feed more on the bottom at night.

== Habitat ==
These shiners can be found in the mid to upper regions of streams and rivers. They can also be found in rocky pools in clear and turbid creeks.

== Distribution ==
They can be found in the Gulf Coast drainages from Texas to Alabama and upwards to Tennessee. Striped shiners can be found in the Great Lakes, New York and Wisconsin.

== Reproduction ==
The breeding season of striped shiners occurs from March to July but can extend into October. During this time male and female colours change from silver to gold and all fins change to orange with the exception of their tail, They spawn in shallow waters over gravelly bottom streams with depressions and over other fishes nests. The males make the depressions by pushing the gravel out with their nose or picking up pieces with their mouths. Males are aggressive towards other males and may bite or attack them with the breeding tubercles they develop on the head and body. The males swim down and tilt to the side while the females swim up alongside the males. The males then swing their caudal peduncle onto the females back. This posture lasts for several seconds but may be interrupted by other aggressive males.

== Etymology ==
Luxilus is derived from lux meaning "light" and illus meaning "little" while chrysocephalus means "golden head".
