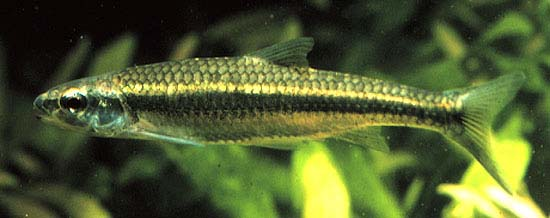

Conservation status
- Least Concern (IUCN 3.1)

Scientific classification
- Kingdom: Animalia
- Phylum: Chordata
- Class: Actinopterygii
- Order: Cypriniformes
- Family: Leuciscidae
- Subfamily: Pogonichthyinae
- Genus: Miniellus
- Species: M. nubilus

Binomial name
- Miniellus nubilus (S. A. Forbes, 1878)

Synonyms
- Alburnops nubilus S. A. Forbes, 1878; Dionda nubila (S. A. Forbes, 1878); Notropis nubilus (S. A. Forbes, 1878)

= Ozark minnow =

Species of fish

The Ozark minnow (Miniellus nubilus) is a species of freshwater ray-finned fish belonging to the family Leuciscidae, the shiners, daces and minnows. It is found in the central United States.

== Appearance ==
The Ozark minnow is a small fish that averages about 2 1/3 to 2 3/4 inches (59 to 70 mm) in length with its maximum length being about 3 inches (76 mm). They have dark yellow or olive coloration along their back and upper sides. Their lower sides are silvery with a stripe running down their midline up past their eye. When in the water, golden spots can be seen over the stripe along the midline. The edges of their scales are dark in color as well. They also have flat snouts and big eyes, and are bilaterally symmetrical. Similar to the Shiner species, the Ozark minnow has a terminal, oblique mouth. It also lacks pigment on the top and base of its mouth. A forked tail and single fin on its dorsal side allow the Ozark minnow to maneuver quickly through the water. The Ozark minnow can easily be distinguished from other fish because of the striking black line which stretches from its head to tail. Although an adult Ozark minnow does not extend more than 3.0 in (76 mm), it possesses a gut that is approximately double the fish's average length. The gut is coiled neatly within the Ozark minnow. These physical descriptions of the Ozark minnow are true for both the males and females in a population meaning that they do not seem to display any sexual dimorphism. In other words, they do not have very different physical traits that are special to the male or female.

== Habitat ==
Ozark minnows are mostly found in creeks or small rivers that have "gravelly or rocky bottoms and strong, permanent flow", and are often found in schools with other minnow species. In addition, they can be found in pools or near riffles, which are "light rapids where water flows across a shallow section of river". They are also most frequently found in waters that are not highly populated, to ensure their safety and protection. Ozark minnows prefer weaker currents to strong currents, but are found slightly below the surface in calmer water. They prefer freshwater and a more benthic biome, staying close to the bottom for the majority of the time. As for their geographic distribution, Ozark minnows can be found in the "central highlands" of the United States. They are mainly found in the Mississippi River of more southern states, in addition to Oklahoma and Kansas, due to excessive farming in the more northern states of Minnesota, Iowa, Illinois, and Wisconsin. Specifically in these states, they have been found in southeast Minnesota in the Root, Cedar, and Zumbro rivers, the northern and southern portions of Wisconsin, and in northeast Oklahoma. They have also been found in the Ozark highlands of Arkansas, Missouri, and Iowa.

== Diet ==
Ozark Minnows are omnivorous, feeding on a variety of plant matter and small invertebrates along the bottom.
