= List of fishes of New Hampshire =

New Hampshire (/ˈhæmpʃər/ HAMP-shər) is a state in the New England region of the Northeastern United States. It borders Massachusetts to the south, Vermont to the west, Maine and the Gulf of Maine to the east, and the Canadian province of Quebec to the north. Of the 50 U.S. states, New Hampshire is the seventh-smallest by land area and the tenth-least populous, with a population of 1,377,529 residents as of the 2020 census. Concord is the state capital and Manchester is the most populous city. New Hampshire's motto, "Live Free or Die", reflects its role in the American Revolutionary War; its nickname, "The Granite State", refers to its extensive granite formations and quarries. It is well known for holding the first primary in the U.S. presidential election cycle, and its resulting influence on American electoral politics.

== Order Petromyzontiformes (Lampreys) ==
Family Petromyzontidae (Northern lampreys)

- Northern brook lamprey (Ichthyomyzon fossor)
- Silver lamprey (Ichthyomyzon unicuspis)
- American brook lamprey (Lethenteron appendix)
- Sea lamprey (Petromyzon marinus)

== Order Anguilliformes (Eels) ==
Family Anguillidae (Freshwater eels)

- American eel (Anguilla rostrata)

== Order Clupeiformes (Herrings & relatives) ==
Family Alosidae (Shads & sardines)

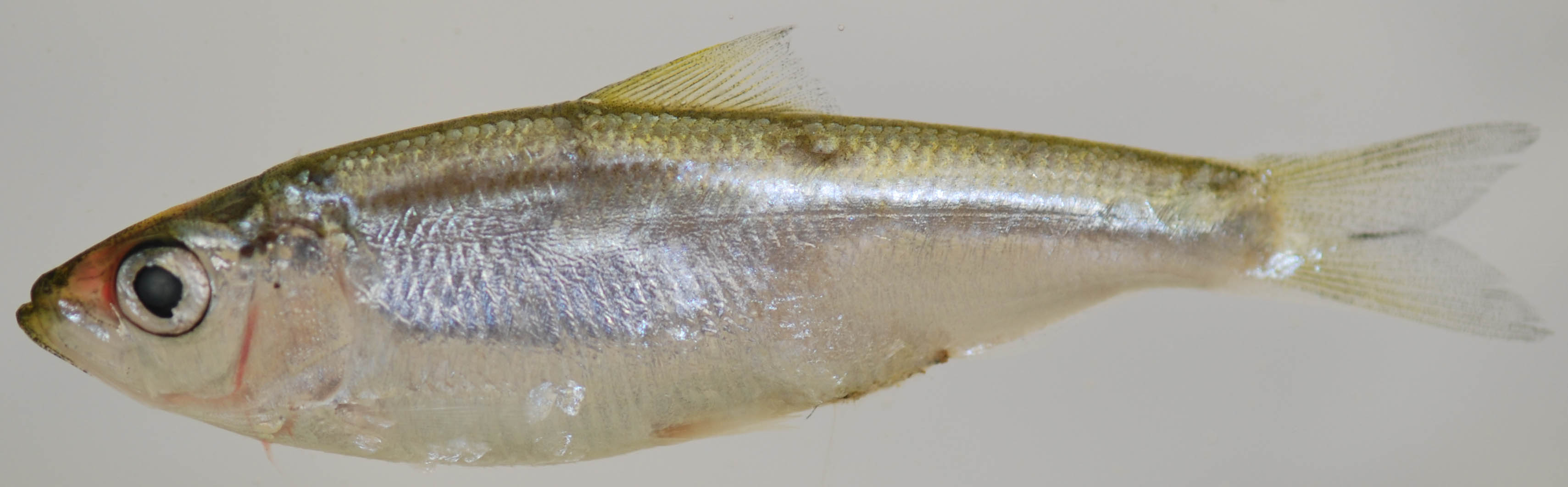
Blueback shad

- Blueback shad (Alosa aestivalis)
- Alewife (Alosa pseudoharengus) (I)
- American shad (Alosa sapidissima)
- American gizzard shad (Dorosoma cepedianum) (I)

== Order Cypriniformes (Carps, minnows, and relatives) ==
Family Cyprinidae (cyprinids)

- Goldfish (Carassius auratus) (I)
- European carp (Cyprinus carpio) (I)

Family Leuciscidae (True minnows)

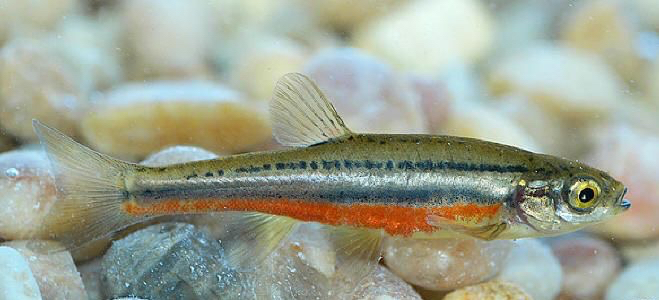
Northern redbelly dace

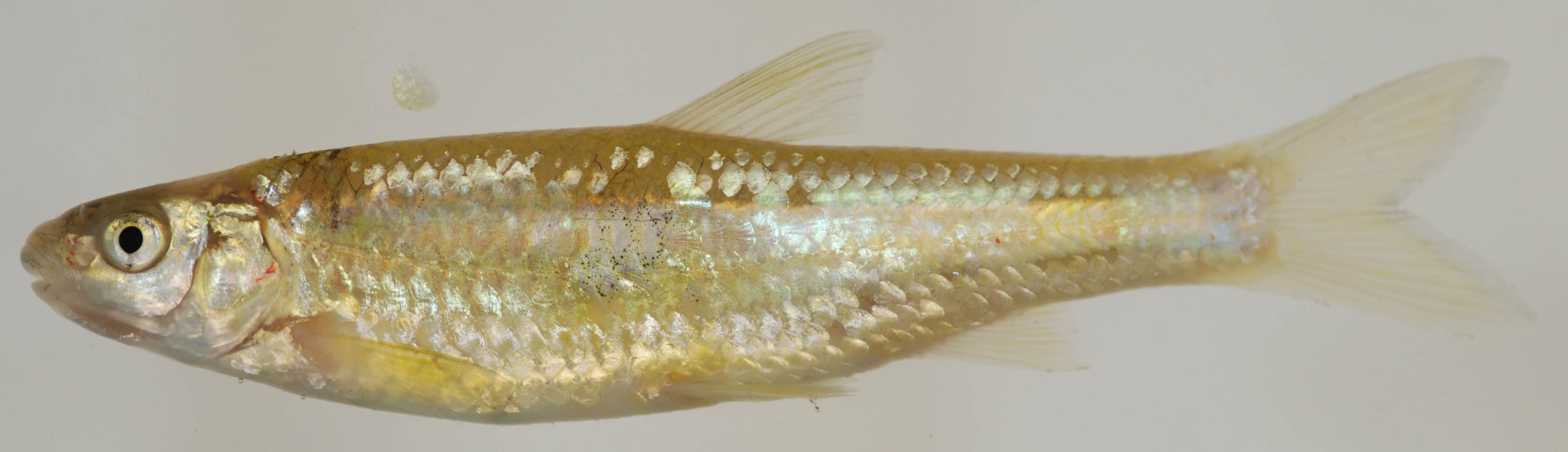
Eastern Silvery Minnow

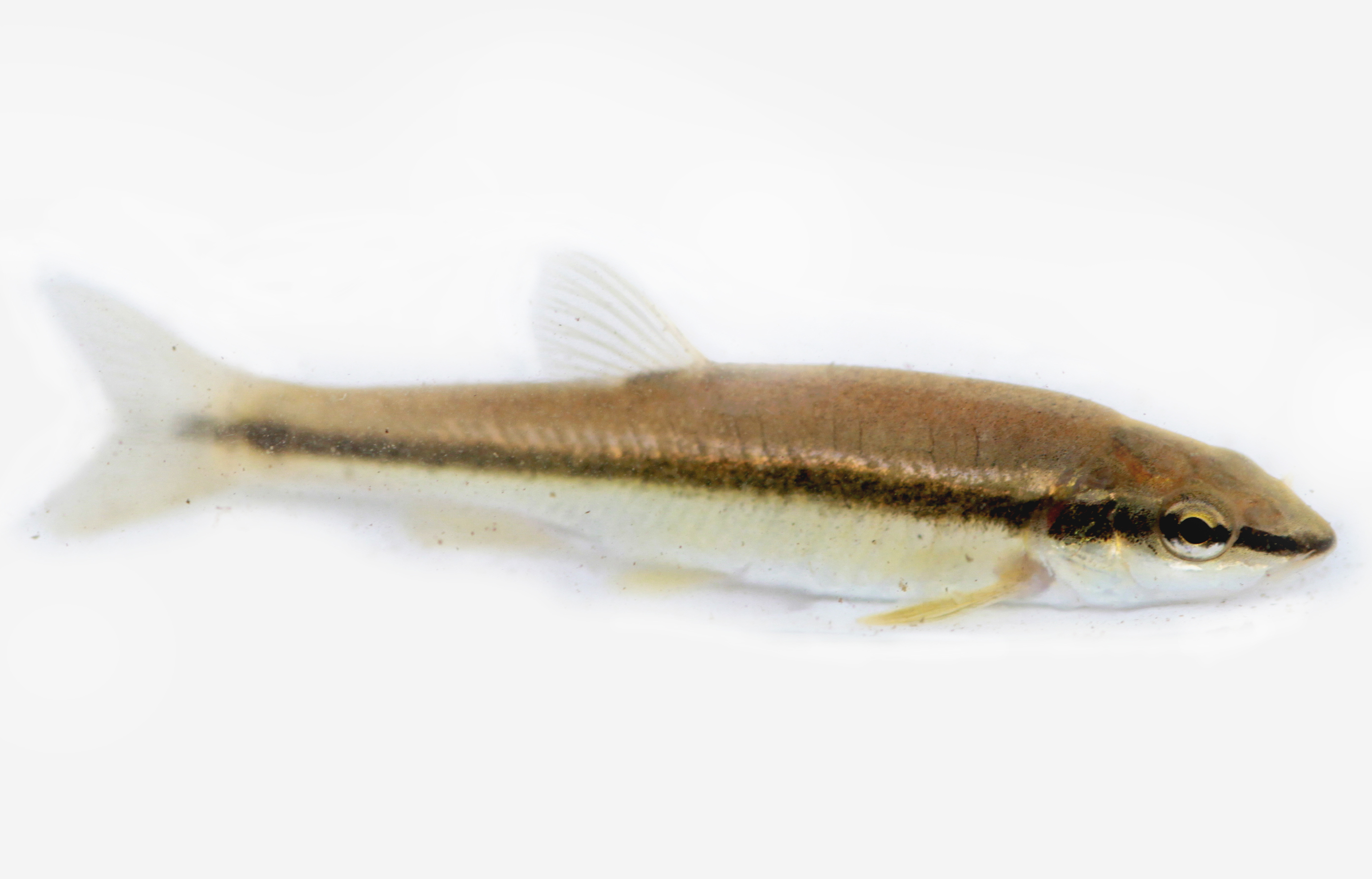
Eastern blacknose dace

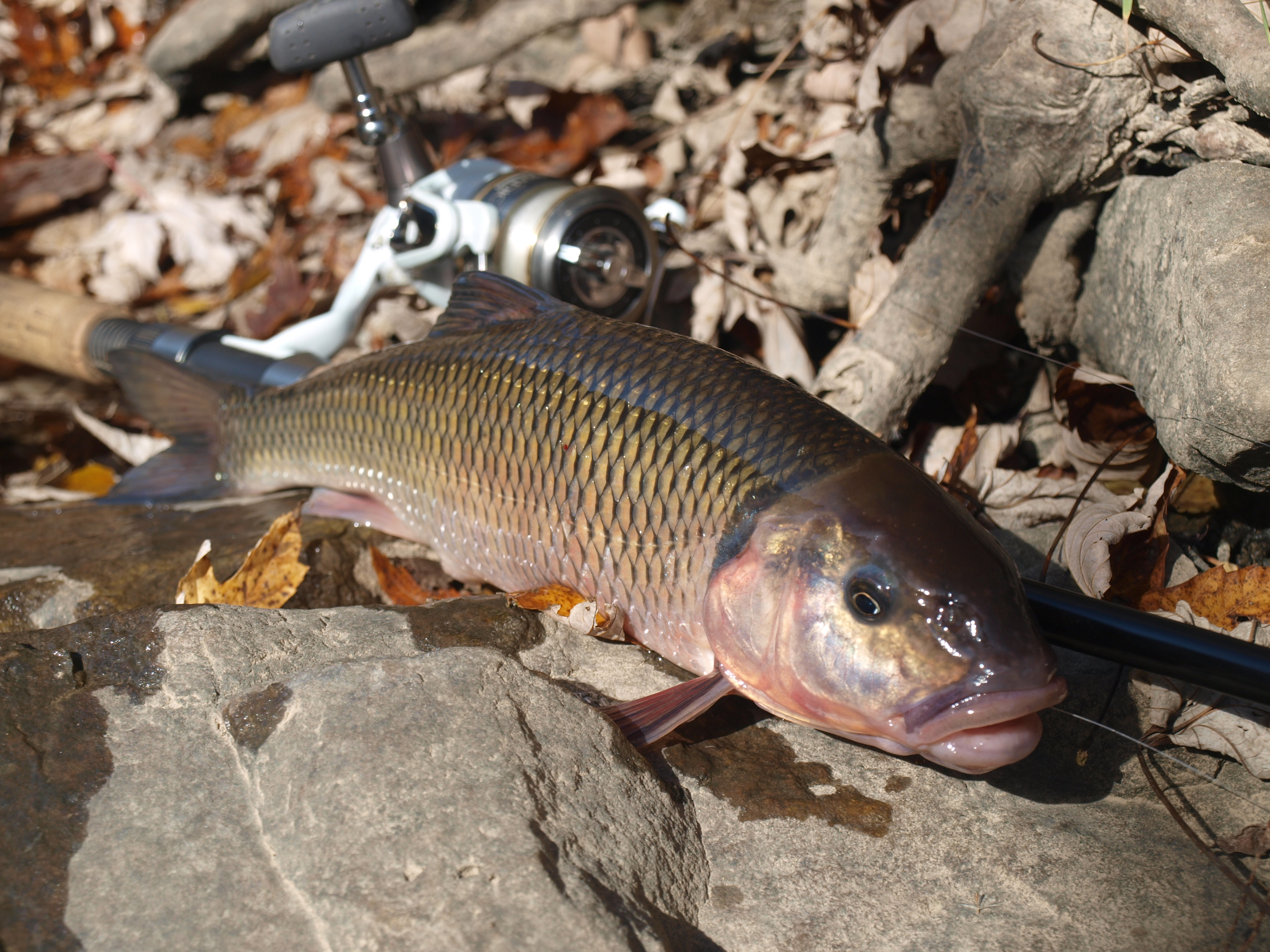
Fallfish

- Northern redbelly dace (Chrosomus eos)
- Finescale dace (Chrosomus neogaeus)
- Lake chub (Couesius plumbeus)
- Spotfin shiner (Cyprinella spiloptera)
- Cutlip minnow (Exoglossum maxillingua)
- Brassy minnow (Hybognathus hankinsoni)
- Eastern silvery minnow (Hybognathus regius)
- Common shiner (Luxilus cornutus)
- Allegheny pearl dace (Margariscus margarita)
- Northern pearl dace (Margariscus nachtriebi)
- Golden shiner (Notemigonus crysoleucas)
- Emerald shiner (Notropis atherinoides)
- Bridle shiner (Notropis bifrenatus)
- Blackchin shiner (Notropis heterodon)
- Blacknose shiner (Notropis heterolepis)
- Spottail shiner (Notropis hudsonius)
- Rosyface shiner (Notropis rubellus)
- Sand shiner (Notropis stramineus)
- Mimic shiner (Notropis volucellus)
- Bluntnose minnow (Pimephales notatus)
- Fathead minnow (Pimephales promelas)
- Eastern blacknose dace (Rhinichthys atratulus)
- Longnose dace (Rhinichthys cataractae)
- Rudd (Scardinius erythrophthalmus) (I)
- Creek chub (Semotilus atromaculatus)
- Fallfish (Semotilus corporalis)

Family Catostomidae (Suckers)

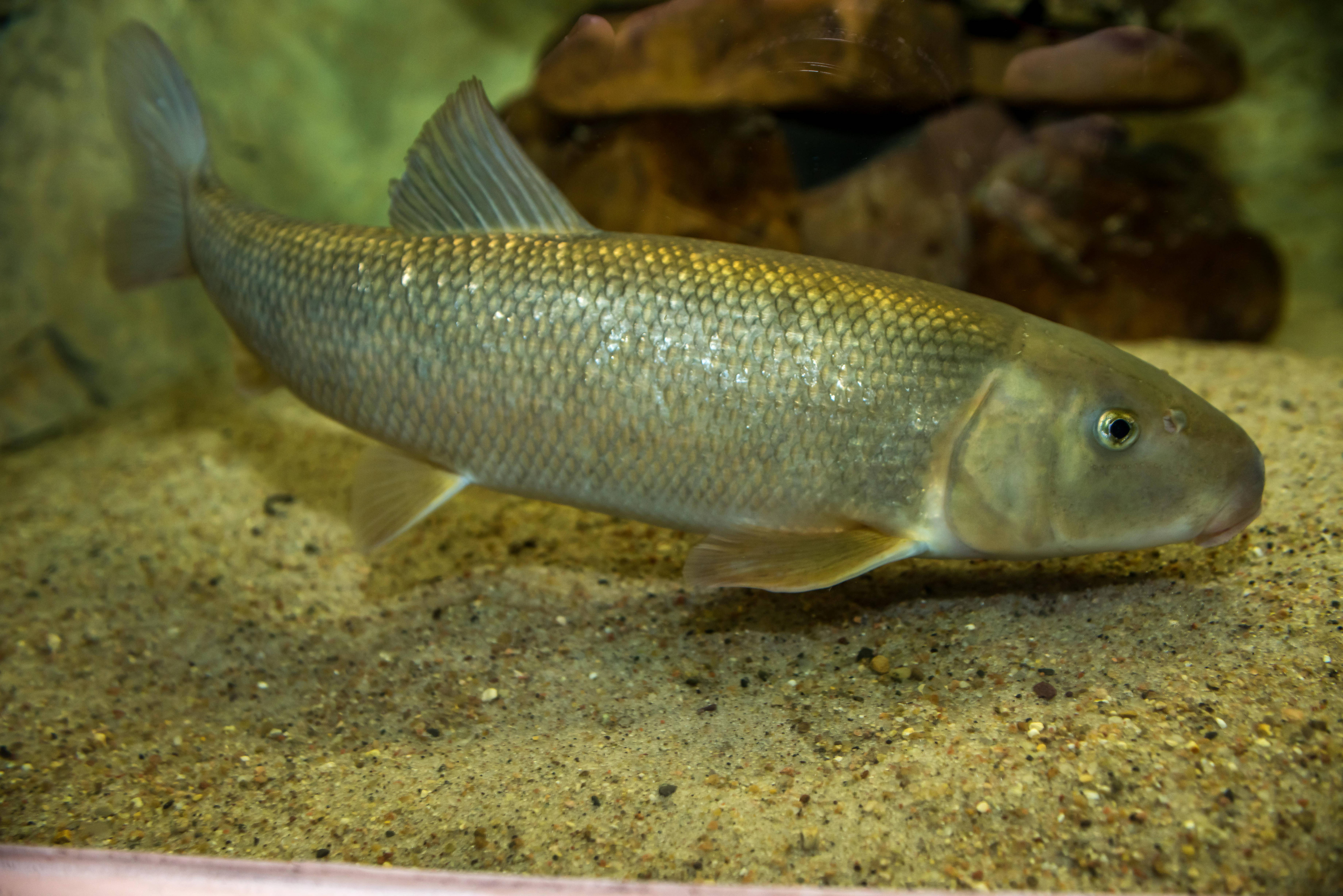
White sucker

- Longnose sucker (Catostomus catostomus)
- White sucker (Catostomus commersonii)

== Order Siluriformes (Catfishes) ==
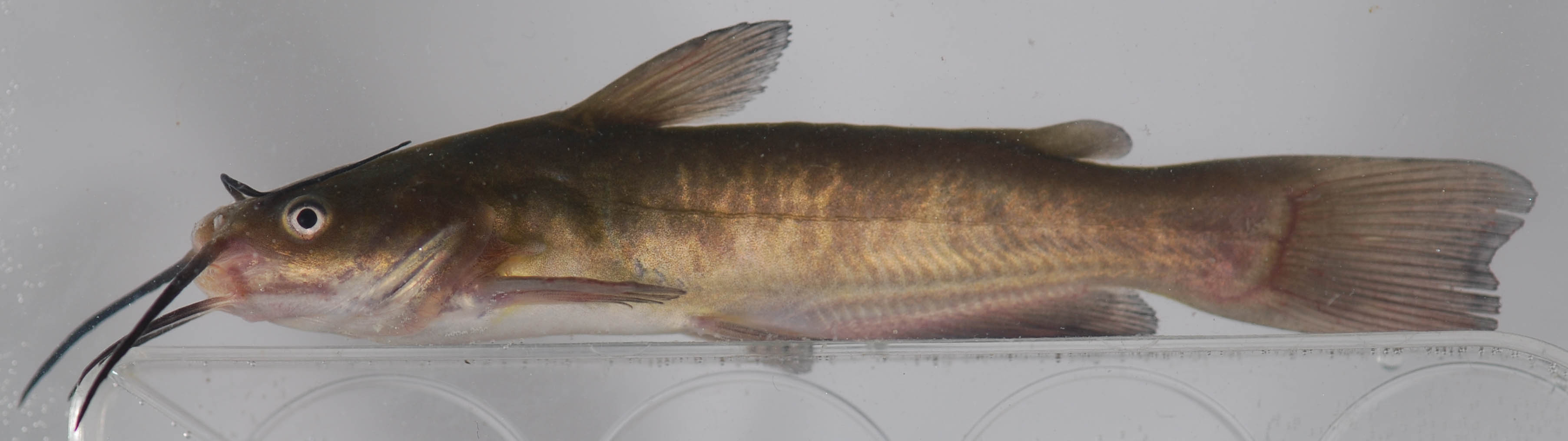
Brown bullhead

Family Ictaluridae (North American freshwater catfishes)

- Yellow bullhead (Ameiurus natalis)
- Brown bullhead (Ameiurus nebulosus)
- Channel catfish (Ictalurus punctatus)
- White bullhead (Ameiurus catus)

== Order Osmeriformes (Smelts & allies) ==
Family Osmeridae (Smelts)

- Rainbow smelt (Osmerus mordax)

== Order Esociformes (Pikes & allies) ==
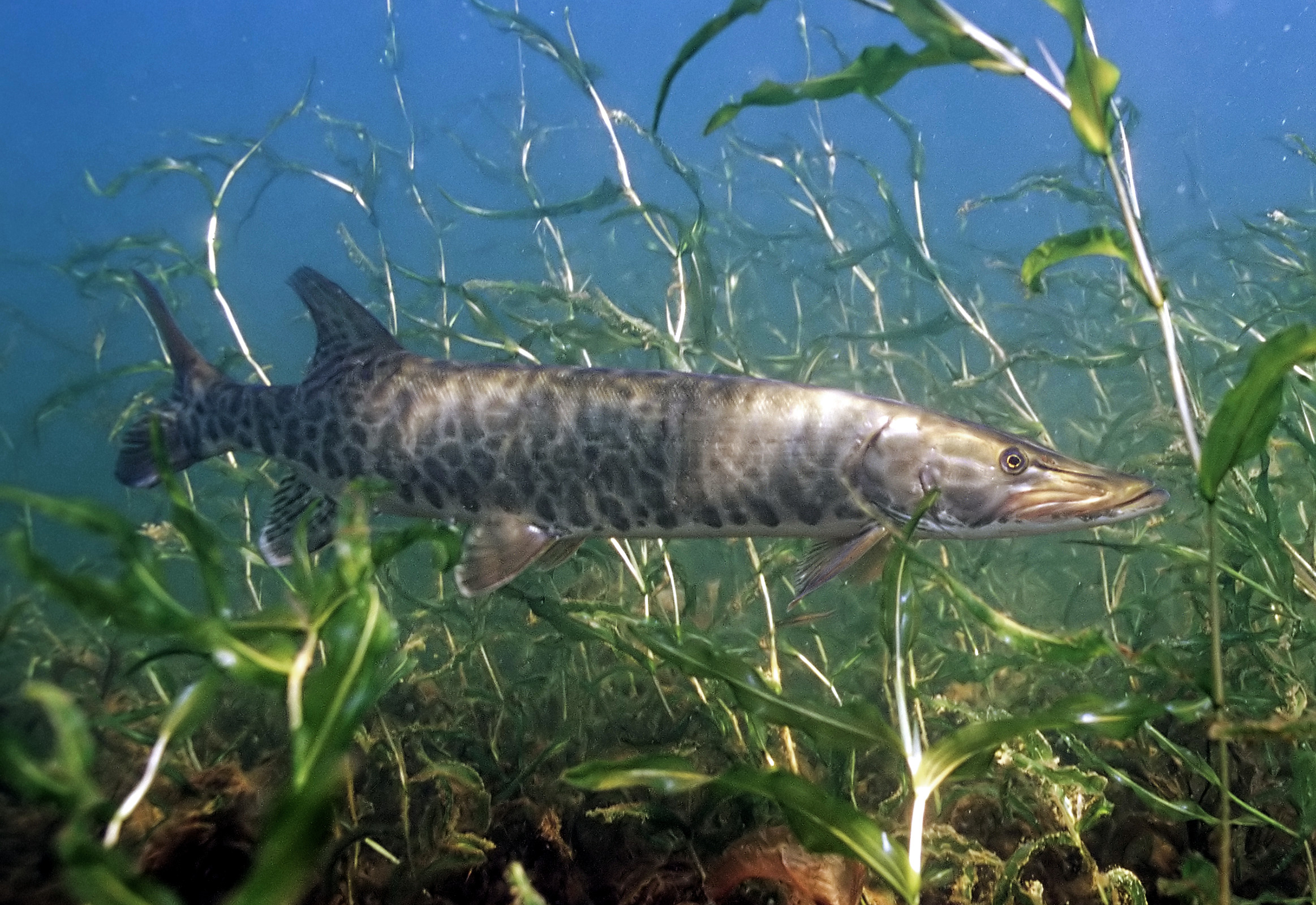
Muskellunge

Family Esocidae (Pikes)

- American pickerel (Esox americanus)
- Northern pike (Esox lucius)
- Chain pickerel (Esox niger)

Family Umbridae (Mudminnows)

- Central mudminnow (Umbra limi)

== Order Salmoniformes (Salmonids) ==
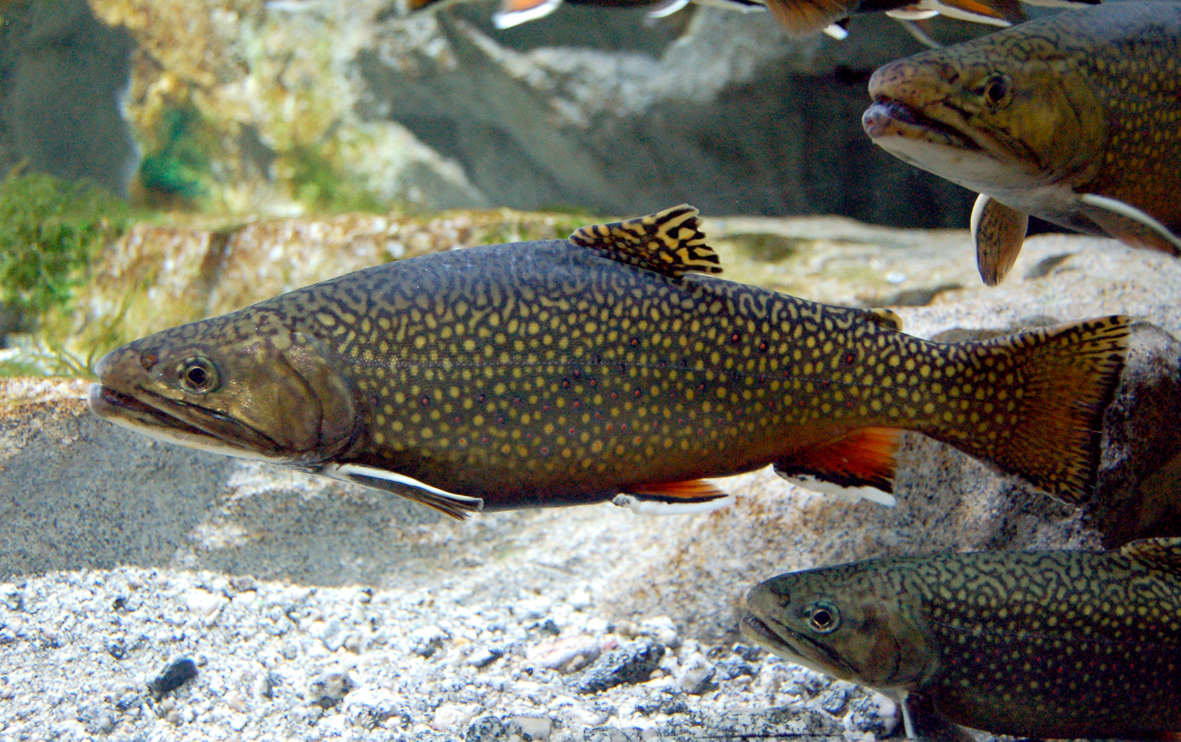
Brook trout

Family Salmonidae (Salmonids)

- Cisco (Coregonus artedi)
- Lake whitefish (Coregonus clupeaformis)
- Rainbow trout (Oncorhynchus mykiss) (I)
- Round whitefish (Prosopium cylindraceum)
- Atlantic salmon (Salmo salar)
- Brown trout (Salmo trutta) (I)
- Arctic char (Salvelinus alpinus) (Ex)
- Brook trout (Salvelinus fontinalis)
- Lake trout (Salvelinus namaycush)

== Order Percopsiformes (Trout-perch & allies) ==
Family Percopsidae (Trout-perch)

- Trout-perch (Percopsis omiscomaycus)

== Order Gadiformes (Cods) ==
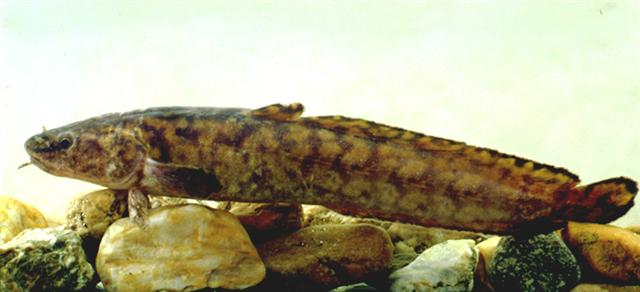
Burbot

Family Lotidae (Lingcods)

- Burbot (Lota lota)

== Order Cyprinodontiformes (Toothcarps) ==
Family Fundulidae (Topminnows & Killifish)

- Banded killifish (Fundulus diaphanus)

Family Atherinidae (Silversides)

- Brook silverside (Labidesthes sicculus)

== Order Scorpaeniformes (Sculpins & allies) ==
Family Gasterosteidae (Sticklebacks)

- Brook stickleback (Culaea inconstans)

Family Cottidae (Sculpins)

- Mottled sculpin (Cottus bairdii)
- Slimy sculpin (Cottus cognatus)

== Order Perciformes (Perch-liked fish) ==
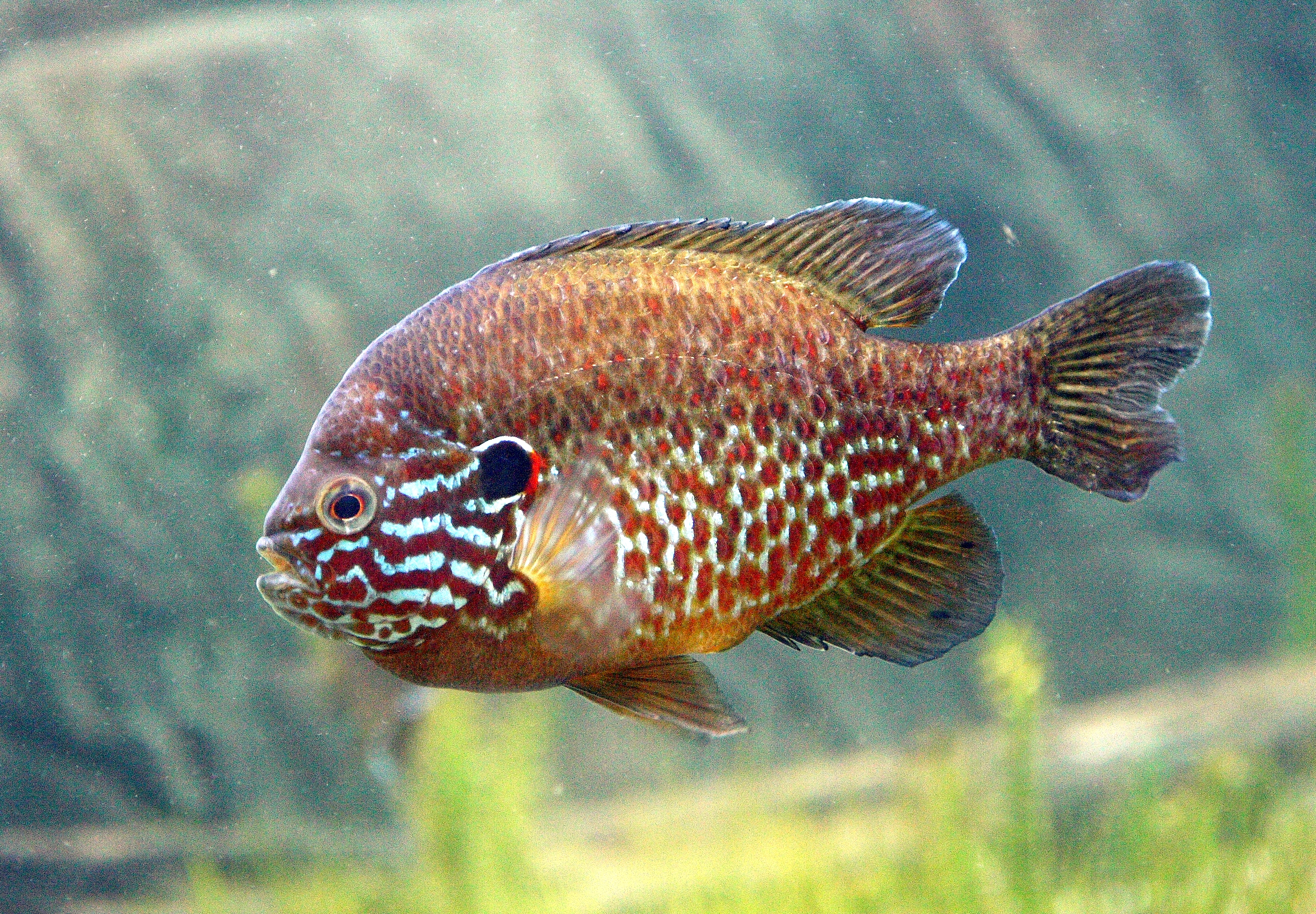
Pumpkinseed

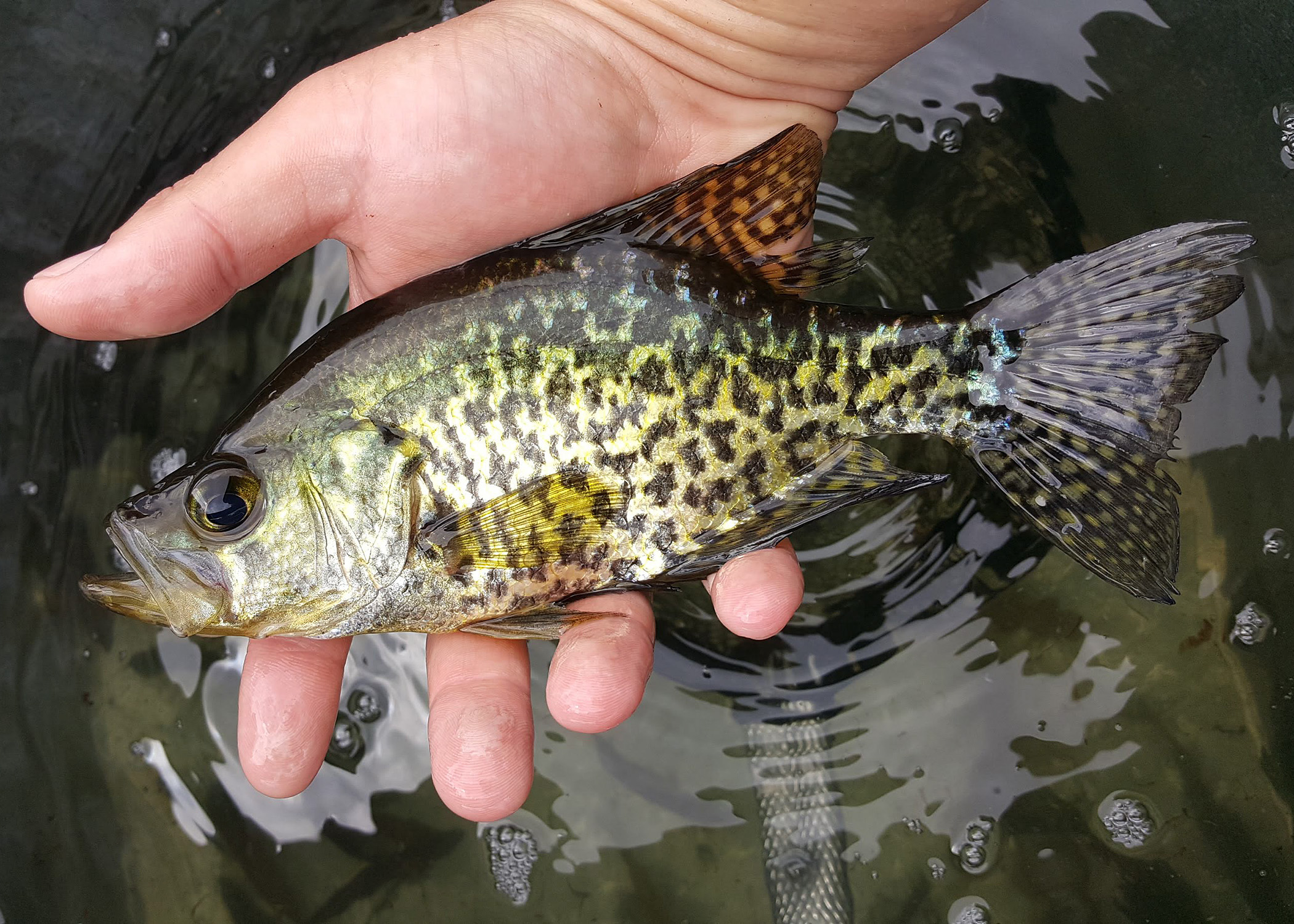
Black crappie

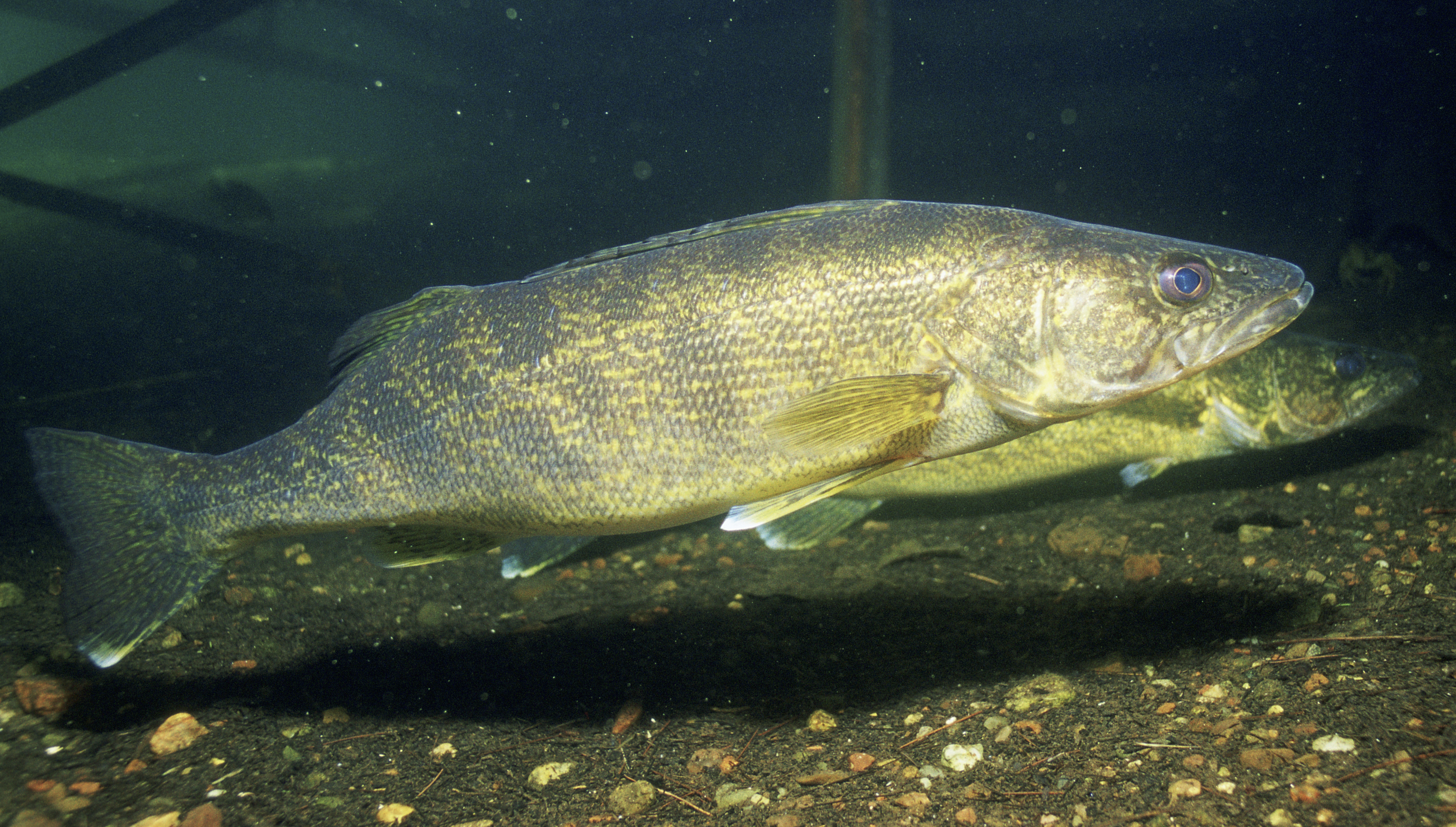
Walleye

Family Moronidae (Temperate basses)

- White perch (Morone americana) (I)

Family Centrarchidae (Sunfishes)

- Rock bass (Ambloplites rupestris)
- Redbreast sunfish (Lepomis auritus)
- Pumpkinseed (Lepomis gibbosus)
- Bluegill (Lepomis macrochirus)
- Redear sunfish (Lepomis microlophus) (I)
- Smallmouth bass (Micropterus dolomieu)
- Largemouth bass (Micropterus salmoides) (I)
- Black crappie (Pomoxis nigromaculatus)

Family Percidae (Perches)

- Eastern sand darter (Ammocrypta pellucida)
- Fantail darter (Etheostoma flabellare)
- Tessellated darter (Etheostoma olmstedi)
- Yellow perch (Perca flavescens)
- Common logperch (Percina caprodes)
- Channel darter (Percina copelandi))
- Walleye (Sander vitreus)
