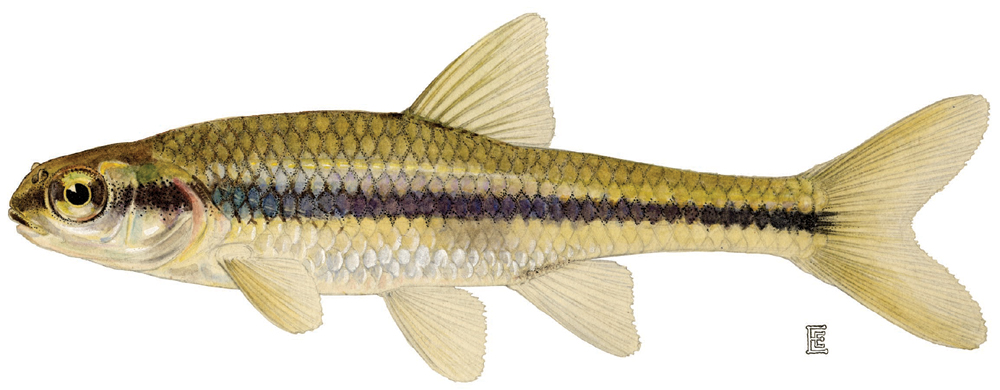

Conservation status
- Least Concern (IUCN 3.1)

- Vulnerable (NatureServe)

Scientific classification
- Kingdom: Animalia
- Phylum: Chordata
- Class: Actinopterygii
- Order: Cypriniformes
- Family: Leuciscidae
- Subfamily: Pogonichthyinae
- Genus: Notropis
- Species: N. bifrenatus

Binomial name
- Notropis bifrenatus (Cope, 1867)

Synonyms
- Hybopsis bifrenatus Cope, 1867; Notropis cayuga Meek, 1889

= Bridle shiner =

Species of fish

The bridle shiner (Notropis bifrenatus) is a species of freshwater ray-finned fish belonging to the family Leuciscidae, the shiners, daces and minnows. This species has been identified as being of Special Concern by the Committee on the Status of Endangered Wildlife in Canada (COSEWIC).

== Distribution ==
The bridle shiner is found in eastern North America, from eastern Lake Ontario, east to Maine, and south to South Carolina. In Ontario, it is found in lowland areas in the eastern Lake Ontario drainage and the Saint Lawrence River. The most stable population is found around the Thousand Islands.

== Characteristics ==
- Small, slender body; somewhat compressed laterally
- Average adult length of 50 mm (2.0 in)
- Snout length usually smaller than eye diameter
- Small, angular, terminal mouth
- Large scales; lateral line incomplete
- Straw-coloured, silvery dorsal side with a green-blue iridescence and silvery-white on ventral side
- Prominent black lateral band from tail to snout
- Males develop minute nuptial tubercles on the head, nape and pectoral fin

== Habitat and life history ==
The bridle shiner is found in quiet areas of streams and occasionally in lakes. It is usually associated with abundant submersed aquatic vegetation and a river bottom composed of silt and sometimes sand. It uses the vegetation for protection, feeding, and spawning. It has been found in moderately turbid water but prefers clear water.

== Diet ==
The bridle shiner mainly feeds on zooplankton and aquatic insect larvae such as chironomids. Plant materials make up a small portion of its diet.

== Threats ==
Like all members of the minnow family, they can be prey for larger fish species such as northern pike, smallmouth bass, and yellow perch.

This species is vulnerable to poor water quality and high turbidity, particularly in agricultural areas. In areas where zebra mussels have invaded, the improved water clarity may benefit this species. The densely growing Eurasian watermilfoil aquatic plant hinders spawning areas for the minnow and may contribute to its decline.

== Similar species ==
The sand shiner (Notropis stramineus) and mimic shiner (Notropis volucellus) are similar but lack a prominent lateral band. The bridle shiner is very similar to other black-lined shiners, including the pugnose shiner (Notropis anogenus), blackchin shiner (Notropis heterodon) and blacknose shiner (Notropis heterolepis). The bridle shiner can be distinguished from pugnose and blackchin shiners by the lack of pigment on the lower jaw. Blacknose shiners also lack this pigment but have a more subterminal mouth as well as eight anal rays: bridles typically have seven.
