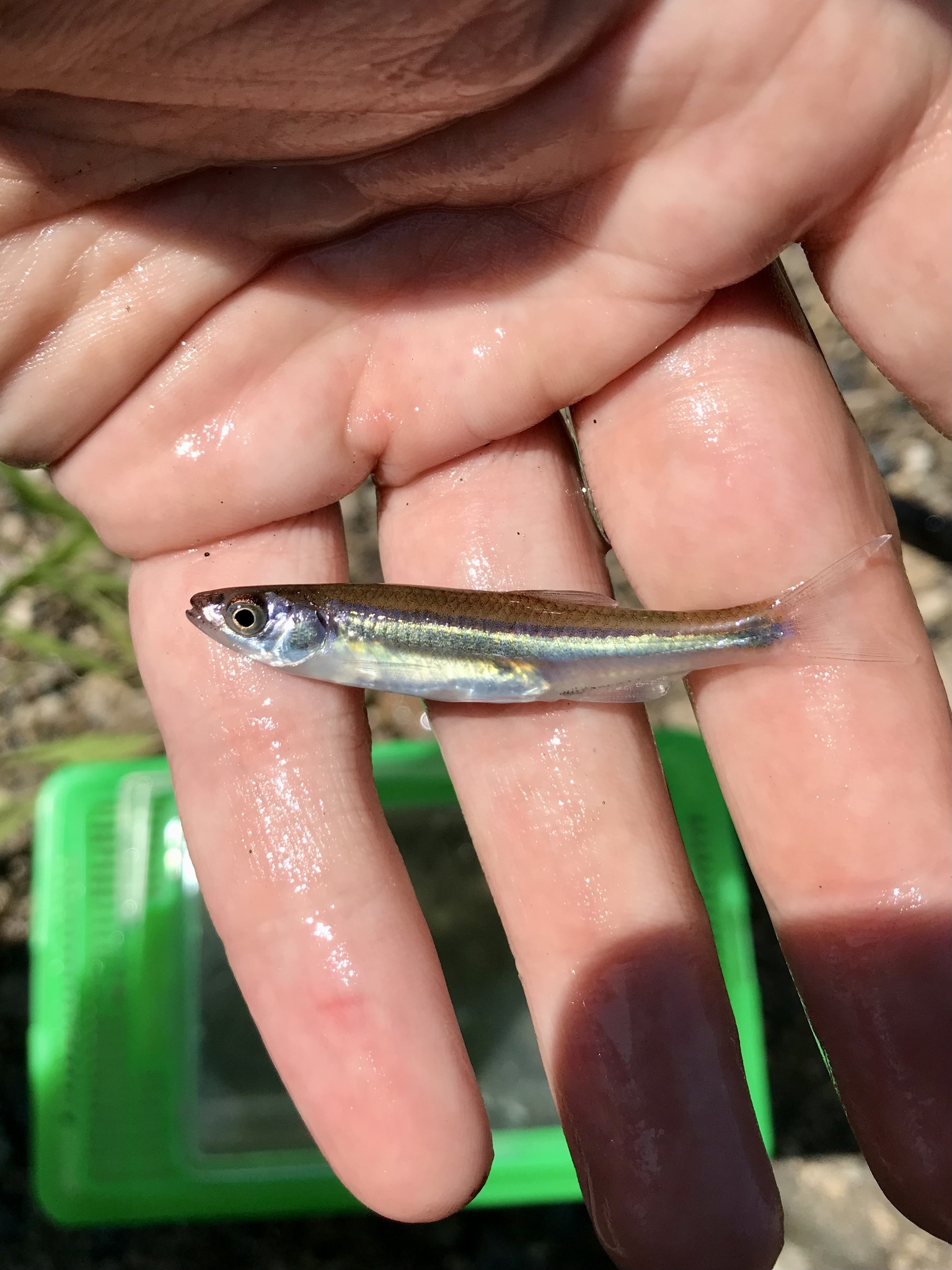

Conservation status
- Least Concern (IUCN 3.1)

- Secure (NatureServe)

Scientific classification
- Kingdom: Animalia
- Phylum: Chordata
- Class: Actinopterygii
- Order: Cypriniformes
- Family: Leuciscidae
- Subfamily: Pogonichthyinae
- Genus: Notropis
- Species: N. percobromus

Binomial name
- Notropis percobromus (Cope, 1871)

Synonyms
- Alburnellus percobromus Cope, 1871

= Carmine shiner =

Species of fish

The carmine shiner (Notropis percobromus) is a species of freshwater ray-finned fish beloinging to the family Leuciscidae, the shiners, daces and minnows. This species is found in eastern North America.

== Description ==
The carmine shiner has the following characteristics and distinguishing features:

- A slender, elongate minnow, typically 55 to 60 mm (2.2 to 2.4 in) in length (Whitemouth River)
- Snout length is equal to the eye diameter
- Adults are olive green dorsally, silvery on the sides and silvery white on the belly
- Black pigment outlines the scale pockets dorsally; the opercula and cheeks may be pinkish
- Breeding males develop fine, sandpaper-like nuptial tubercles on the head, pectoral fins and some predorsal scales. They also turn pinkish violet around the head with a reddish tinge at the base of the dorsal fin. Breeding females are usually lighter in colour
- Seldom survives capture or handling and scales are easily dislodged

== Distribution ==
Eastern North America, in the United States it is found throughout the eastern part of the country from North and South Dakota in the west as far south as Arkansas. In Canada, this species has been found only in the Winnipeg River system, including the Whitemouth watershed. It may occur upstream to Lake of the Woods, Ontario. The Manitoba populations are at the northwestern limit of the distribution, separated from the continuous range of the species by 450 km (280 mi).

== Habitat and life history ==
Carmine shiners typically summer at midwater depths of clear, fast flowing streams and small rivers over clean gravel or rubble substrates. They often school in riffles and pools near the confluence with larger streams and rivers. Habitat use during other seasons and by young-of-the-year has not been studied in Manitoba, nor has spawning. However, a ripe and running female was taken in the Pinawa Channel in 19.3 °C (66.7 °F) water. Southern populations typically spawn in riffles in May/June at temperatures of 20 to 28.9 °C (68.0 to 84.0 °F). Adhesive eggs are deposited into depressions in gravel, often in the nests of other minnow species. Eggs hatch within 60 hours at 21 °C (70 °F) and newly hatched larvae work their way vertically into the gravel. These fish are mature at one year and live about three years. Individuals likely move into deeper water to winter.

== Conservation status ==
This species has been identified as Endangered by the Committee on the Status of Endangered Wildlife in Canada (COSEWIC). It is listed under the federal Species at Risk Act (SARA) and was afforded protection under the SARA as of June 2004. Additional protection is afforded through the federal Fisheries Act. Under the SARA, a recovery strategy has been developed for this species.

== Diet ==
This fish eats primarily aquatic insects, some terrestrial insects, fish eggs, algae and diatoms. Prey are located by sight.

== Threats ==
This species may be threatened by activities that alter turbidity, flow and/or substrate such as channelization, impoundment, drainage that increases sediment loading, streambed gravel removal and shoreline development. It has a narrow range of habitat requirements and may respond quickly to changes in habitat and water quality. During the past century, impoundments that have increased turbidity and decreased riffle habitat may have caused a decline in the abundance of this fish in the Winnipeg River system. Species introductions and bait harvesting may also pose a threat.

== Similar species ==
The carmine shiner resembles its close relative the emerald shiner (Notropis atherinoides), which has a deeper, more compressed body shape and blunter snout.

== Text sources ==
- DFO/2005-858: Department of Fisheries and Oceans, Her Majesty the Queen in Right of Canada, 2005
- Cat. No. Fs22-4/38-2005E-PDF ISBN 0-662-41529-9
- Evermann and Goldsborough 1907; Houston 1994 (COSEWIC Status Report); Woods et al. 2002; Stewart and Watkinson 2004.
