= Yazoo =

Yazoo may refer to:

== Indigenous people ==
- Yazoo people, a Native American people who lived in Mississippi, United States
- Yazoo language, an unattested Indigenous language

== Businesses and products ==
- Yazoo Brewing Company, a brewery in Nashville, Tennessee, United States
- Yazoo/Kees (originally Yazoo Manufacturing Company), a maker of lawn mowers owned by Husqvarna
- Yazoo Records, an American record label
- Yazoo (drink), a flavoured milk drink made by Campina

== Geography ==
- Yazoo Clay, a geologic formation in Alabama, Louisiana, and Mississippi
- Yazoo County, Mississippi
  - Yazoo City, Mississippi
- Yazoo lands, a historic area in Mississippi and Alabama formerly occupied by the Yazoo tribe
- Yazoo River, Mississippi, United States
- Yazoo stream, a type of floodplain tributary

== Other uses ==
- USS Yazoo, several United States Navy ships
- Yazoo (band), a 1980s English pop band, known as Yaz in Canada and the United States
- Yazoo, a character from Final Fantasy VII: Advent Children
- Yazoo land scandal, early American real estate fraud resulting in a landmark Supreme Court decision regarding contract law
- Yazoo darter (Etheostoma raneyi) a species of fish endemic to Mississippi, United States
- Yazoo shiner (Notropis rafinesquei), a species of fish endemic to Mississippi, United States

== See also ==
- Little Yazoo, Mississippi
- Yazoo Delta Railroad
