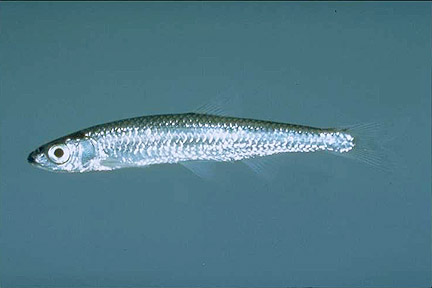

Conservation status
- Least Concern (IUCN 3.1)

Scientific classification
- Kingdom: Animalia
- Phylum: Chordata
- Class: Actinopterygii
- Order: Cypriniformes
- Family: Leuciscidae
- Subfamily: Pogonichthyinae
- Genus: Notropis
- Species: N. photogenis

Binomial name
- Notropis photogenis (Cope, 1865)

Synonyms
- Squalius photogenis Cope, 1865; Alburnellus arge Cope, 1867; Photogenis leucops Cope, 1867; Photogenis leucops var. engraulinus Cope, 1868; Photogenis leuciodus Cope, 1868

= Silver shiner =

Species of fish

The silver shiner (Notropis photogenis) is a species of freshwater ray-finned fish beloinging to the family Leuciscidae, the shiners, daces and minnows. It is found in the United States and Canada where it inhabits much of the Ohio River basin south to northern Georgia in the Tennessee River drainage. It also found in western Lake Erie tributaries and the Grand River system in Ontario. Though visually very similar to the emerald shiner, which occupies a similar range, it can be distinguished by the presence of two dark crescents between its nostrils, on the top of the head.
