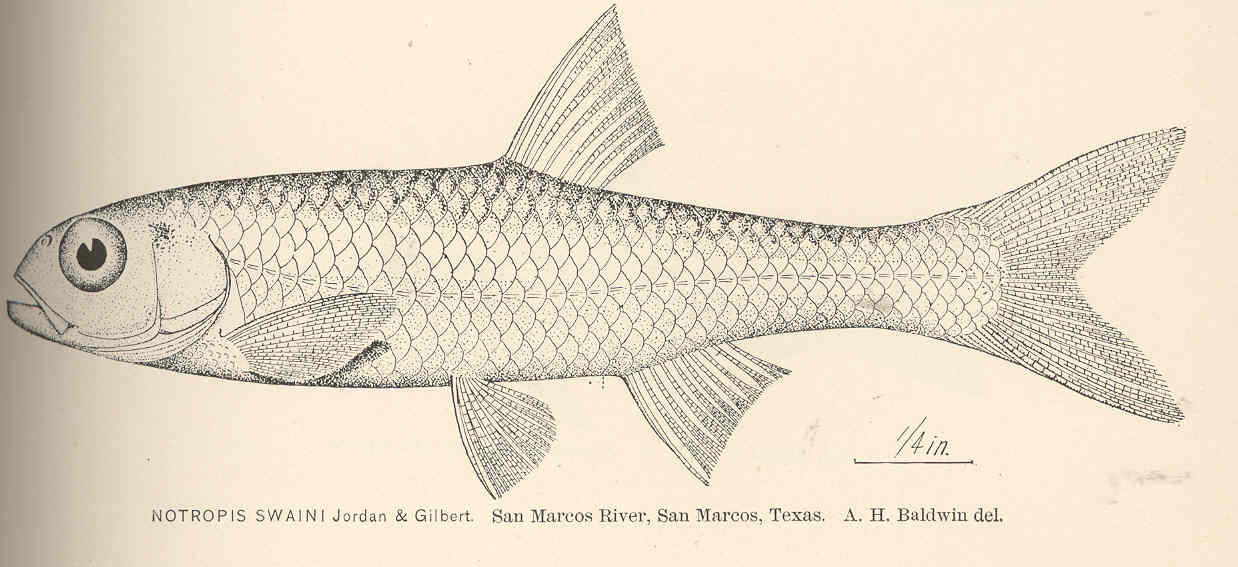

Scientific classification
- Kingdom: Animalia
- Phylum: Chordata
- Class: Actinopterygii
- Order: Cypriniformes
- Family: Leuciscidae
- Subfamily: Pogonichthyinae
- Genus: Notropis
- Species: N. megalops

Binomial name
- Notropis megalops Girard, 1856

Synonyms
- Alburnus megalops Girard, 1856; Alburnus socius Girard, 1856; Notropis swaini D. S. Jordan & Gilbert, 1885

= Notropis megalops =

Species of fish

Notropis megalops, the West Texas shiner, is a species of freshwater ray-finned fish from the family Leuciscidae, the shiners, daces and minnows. It was originally described by the French ichthyologist Charles Frédéric Girard in 1856 but was thought to be a misidentification for the Texas shiner (Notropis amiabilis) but detailed genetic and morphological studies have shown that N. megalops and N. amabilis are two valid but separate species. N. megalops has been found only in the drainage of the Rio Grande where it has a fragmented distribution and low levels of genetic diversity. Notropis megalops is endemic to the Rio Grande drainage of Texas and in Coahuila and Nuevo León in Mexico and does not overlap with N. amiabilis and despite their morphological similarity they do not appear to be closely related.
