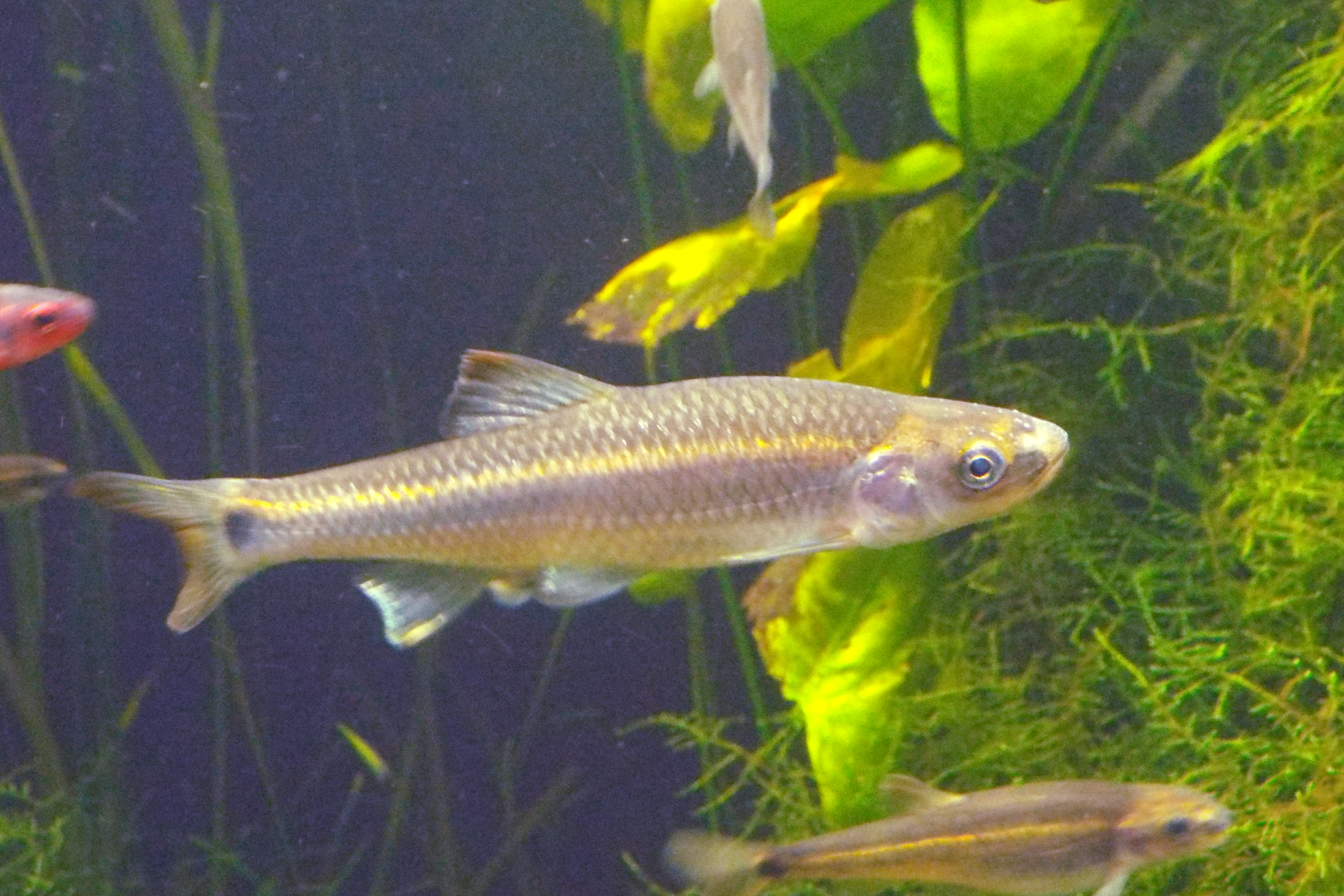

Conservation status
- Least Concern (IUCN 3.1)

Scientific classification
- Kingdom: Animalia
- Phylum: Chordata
- Class: Actinopterygii
- Order: Cypriniformes
- Family: Leuciscidae
- Subfamily: Pogonichthyinae
- Genus: Notropis
- Species: N. stilbius

Binomial name
- Notropis stilbius D. S. Jordan, 1877

= Silverstripe shiner =

Species of fish

The silverstripe shiner (Notropis stilbius) is a species of freshwater ray-finned fish beloinging to the family Leuciscidae, the shiners, daces and minnows. This species is endemic to the United States where it is widespread in Mobile Bay drainage in Mississippi, Alabama, Tennessee and Georgia.
