= Highland shiner =

Conservation status
- Least Concern (IUCN 3.1)

Scientific classification
- Kingdom: Animalia
- Phylum: Chordata
- Class: Actinopterygii
- Order: Cypriniformes
- Family: Leuciscidae
- Subfamily: Pogonichthyinae
- Genus: Notropis
- Species: N. micropteryx

Binomial name
- Notropis micropteryx (Cope, 1868)

Synonyms
- Alburnellus micropteryx Cope, 1868

Species of fish

The highland shiner (Notropis micropteryx) is a species of freshwater ray-finned fish in the family Leuciscidae, the shiners, daces and minnows. It is endemic to the United States where it is found in tributaries of the Green, Cumberland, and Tennessee rivers in southern Kentucky, northern Alabama, Virginia, and western North Carolina.
