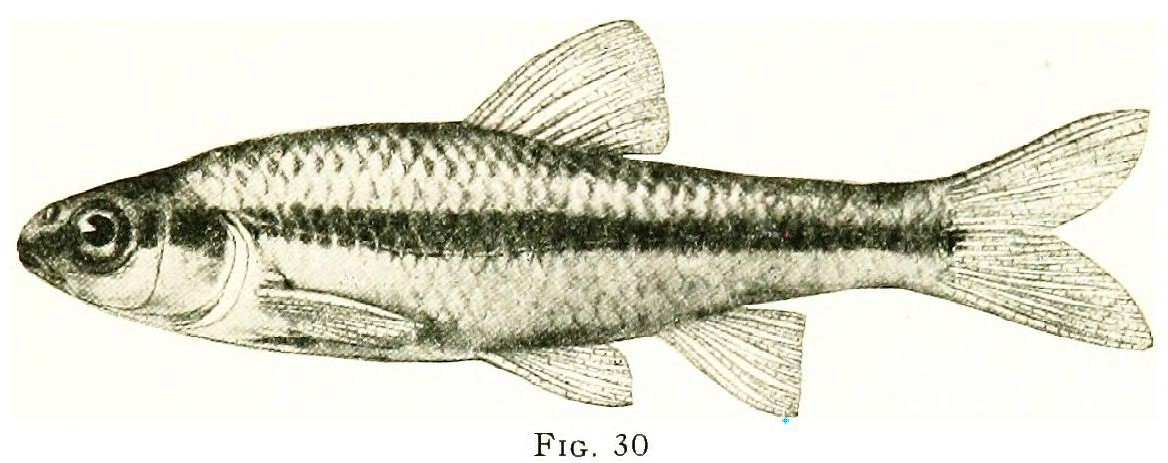
- Illustration of Notropis heterodon

Conservation status
- Least Concern (IUCN 3.1)

Scientific classification
- Kingdom: Animalia
- Phylum: Chordata
- Class: Actinopterygii
- Order: Cypriniformes
- Family: Leuciscidae
- Subfamily: Pogonichthyinae
- Genus: Miniellus
- Species: M. heterodon

Binomial name
- Miniellus heterodon (Cope, 1865)

Synonyms
- Alburnops heterodon Cope, 1865; Notropis heterodon (Cope 1865)

= Blackchin shiner =

Species of fish

The blackchin shiner (Miniellus heterodon) is a species of freshwater ray-finned fish belonging to the family Leuciscidae, the shiners, daces and minnows. Described by Edward Drinker Cope in 1865, it is not a well-known species. It is a close relative of the blacknose shiner. Chiefly occurring now in the Great Lakes and occasionally in upper Mississippi River drainages, the blackchin once ranged commonly as far south as Illinois and Ohio. This fish resides over sandy bottoms in cool waters that provide a lot of cover for the small minnow. Omnivorous, it eats worms and small arthropods as well as plant material. Blackchin shiners are unique because of their anatomical features, such as the black coloring, the incomplete lateral line, and a distinctive dental arrangement.

== Taxonomy ==
American naturalist Edward Drinker Cope described the blackchin shiner in 1865 as Alburnops heterodon, from specimens collected in Lansing and Grosse Isle, Michigan. The original type specimens have been lost. The genus Alburnops was later sunk into the large genus Notropis.

The common name of the blackchin shiner comes from the black pigment of the scales on the tip of the lower jaw. This coloring runs over their eyes, across the gills, and along the side, all the way to the base of their tail. This is especially unique because the stripe appears to zig-zag around the scales, whereas the stripes of other shiners do not.

== Description ==
Blackchin shiners have a thin strip of golden scales just above their black stripe. They also have scales on their backs and upper sides that have dark edges, which make them unique from other shiners. Another thing that makes this species of shiner unique, especially from the closely related bigeye shiner, is that blackchin shiners have an incomplete lateral line with a dusky spot above and below each sensory pore. All fins of blackchin shiners are transparent, and the underbelly is a pale cream shade.

The scales of these fishes are thinner, flexible scales called bony-ridged scales. Blackchins have scales called cycloid scales, which are round and, compared to the scales of other fishes, smooth. These scales are a clue that this species is primitive in comparison to other teleosts, many of whom have ctenoid scales. For species of fish with either version of leptoid scales, the age of the fish can be determined by examining the pattern of ridges on a scale, similar to how tree trunk rings display the age of a tree.

A straight lateral line is positioned roughly near the center of their sides. These fish also have eight anal fin rays on the tail fin, which is a forked version of a homocercal tail. The dorsal fin lies behind the middle of the body. The dorsal fins of all soft-rayed teleosts are supported by soft, flexible rays, and this shiner is no different. The paired ventral fins of shiners are located in the abdominal position, where these pelvic fins are expected to be found: back near the anus. The teeth located at the back of the throat are arranged in two rows, with one tooth in the outer row and four in the inner row, which distinguishes them from related species. The mouth of the blackchin shiner is a pale, off-white color on the inside. These characteristics all help biologists distinguish between various taxonomies.

They are usually measured between 1.5 and 2.5 inches, but have been recorded at up to 4.5 inches. These deep-bodied fishes have a compressed body. However, unlike other deep-bodied fishes, the preferred depth of the fish has shown no relation to the length of the fish. Contrarily typical to deep-bodied fish, blackchins can produce short bursts of speed, but cannot sustain their speed for long. Their maneuverable bodies are slim, which allows them accuracy and efficiency near the safety of weeds, but proves difficult for them when they encounter moving water.

== Distribution ==
Blackchin shiners are only known to be found in North America. They have been seen widely throughout southern Quebec in Canada, and from Vermont to Minnesota to Iowa in the United States. They mostly remain in the Great Lakes and upper Mississippi River basins, but a few have been spotted in various Atlantic drainages, the upper Ohio River basin, and the Hudson Bay area.

=== Habitat and ecology ===
The species mostly resides in cool glacial lakes. However, the habitat preference is for a protected weedy area. Therefore, they have also been found near the inlets and outlets of large lakes, in shallow pools, in slow creeks, and in small rivers. These freshwater fish are usually found over sandy bottoms, and seem to prefer clear waters, because they do not remain long in heavily silted waters. When disturbed, this shiner hides in the weeds for protection.

== Conservation status ==
The blackchin shiner is currently not of ecological concern. There may be some minor threats, but populations appears to be fairly stable, as it is represented across a large and broad spectrum of locations. Whether the fish are remaining stable or in slight decline is currently unknown due to a lack of data, but they are ranked as a species of 'Least Concern'. However, it is thought that they were once widely populous in Illinois as well as Ohio, and are now only lightly scattered throughout those states. It was thought to have vanished from Ohio before 1940, until it was found in Myers Lake in Canton, Ohio, and a single fish turned up in Nettle Lake in northwestern Ohio in the early 1980s. It is classified as threatened in Illinois.

== Life history ==
Juvenile blackchin shiners are visually and anatomically similar to their adult counterparts, although the black lateral line may be faint.

=== Reproduction ===
When breeding, the male blackchin shiner can turn golden-yellow. Wart-like nodules sometimes appear on its crown and pectoral fins. These coloring differences appear to make him more attractive to females of his kind. Female blackchin shiners collected between the months of July and August are often reported to be carrying mature eggs. This suggests that spawning begins around May.

== Food chain ==
Blackchin shiners are highly abundant, small fish. These factors increase the likelihood that the blackchin shiner is a food source for juvenile northern pike (Esox lucius) and yellow perch (Perca flavescens), both of which are found in the same areas of Manitoba.

=== Diet ===
Water fleas (cladocera) and midges have been found inside the blackchin shiner's digestive system, the presence of the latter showing that the fish takes them at the river surface. The worms and plant material also found in the stomachs of these fish lend evidence that this omnivore also has the ability to do some foraging and bottom-feeding, as well.

The mouth of a blackchin shiner is located in the terminal position, which is the most common location. This anatomical location alludes to the fact that these shiners probably feed midwater, although this position is versatile and therefore alone does not provide conclusive evidence of this.
