= Technology treadmill =

In agriculture, technology treadmill is the cycle of improving technology, reducing the cost of production, and increasing farm sizes. The technology treadmill theory was first described by Willard Cochrane in 1958 to explain the increasing land consolidation and ownership of farms and to show how the treadmill creates incentives for people to leave farming and become landowners.

== History ==
The technology treadmill begins when a small number of farmers adopt new technology early. These farmers make profits for a short while because their production costs are lower than other farmers. As more farmers get on the treadmill and adopt the technology, overall production goes up, prices go down, and profits are no longer possible – even with the lower production costs. Consequently, new technology must be created to make profits possible again. Furthermore, the remaining farmers are forced to sell their products at lower prices and if they want to remain competitive. Those farmers who do not get on the treadmill go down in the price squeeze and the more successful farmers expand over them.
