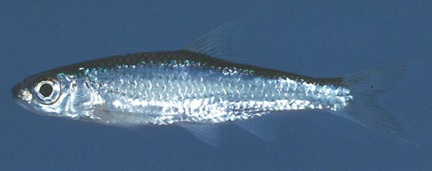

Conservation status
- Least Concern (IUCN 3.1)

Scientific classification
- Kingdom: Animalia
- Phylum: Chordata
- Class: Actinopterygii
- Order: Cypriniformes
- Family: Leuciscidae
- Subfamily: Pogonichthyinae
- Genus: Notropis
- Species: N. ariommus

Binomial name
- Notropis ariommus (Cope, 1867)

Synonyms
- Photogenis ariommus Cope, 1867

= Popeye shiner =

Species of fish

The popeye shiner (Notropis ariommus) is a species of freshwater ray-finned fish belonging to the family Leuciscidae, the shiners, daces and minnows. This species is found in the United States.

== Geographic distribution ==
The popeye shiner is native to the United States, particularly the Ohio River basin and the Tennessee River drainage, spanning the states of Alabama, Georgia, Indiana, Kentucky, Ohio, Pennsylvania, Tennessee, and West Virginia. Specific locations include the Tennessee River in Alabama and Georgia; the Wabash River in Indiana; and the Cheat River, Kanawha River (non-native), and New River in West Virginia. Between 1894 and 1949, only three specimens had been definitively identified. Later, however, the number of Popeye shiners began to increase, even in places that had been well documented previously and showed no trace of the Popeye shiner.

== Ecology ==
Popeye shiners are freshwater insectivores. They consume aquatic insects, including midges, caddisflies, mayflies, and beetles. These benthopelagic fish are found in temperate waters, particularly large creeks and small rivers that are extremely clear and have gravel bottoms. The bodies of water in which they are found also tend to have slow to moderate flow.

It is precisely the water flow and preferred clarity of water that makes survival difficult. Since the popeye shiner lives in pristine clear water, any contamination may adversely affect this property and subsequently diminish the ability of these fish to thrive. Industrialization may lead to sedimentation as well as siltation due to increased runoff as a result of agricultural practices. Over time, the erosion will create an unsuitable habitat for the popeye shiner, and species abundance will decrease. Another source of habitat destruction includes pollution. Based on the size of the streams the popeye shiner inhabits, it has likely been exposed to more of these negative impacts than other fish.

Similarly, the rate at which these bodies of water flow is in jeopardy. Popeye shiners inhabit slowly or moderately flowing rivers or creeks. The industrial practice of building dams may result in a modification of the flow, and, like increased siltation, transform rivers into unsuitable habitats for the popeye shiner.

== Life history ==
The minnows spawn in the spring or summer. Other aspects of their life history are relatively unknown.

== Current management ==
Popeye shiners are listed as endangered by Georgia and Ohio, and extirpated in Indiana. This could potentially be due to destruction of their preferred habitat, as industrialization (i.e. logging, damming, strip mining) continues, although a better culprit may be due to the influx of invasive species.

Very little is being done to manage the Popeye shiner. A major threat to these fish is an influx of exotic fish species. In Indiana, an influx of three species of Asian carp—grass carp (Ctenopharyngodon idella), bighead carp (Hypothalmichthys nobilis), and silver carp (Hypothalmichthys molitrix)—likely contributed to the total extirpation of the Popeye shiner.

Ohio has a program that strives to protect and restore stream habitats of native species that are endangered or threatened in some way. This program is known as the Division of Wildlife's Stream Conservation Program. The intent of this program is to assess and record the number of species deemed "Species of Greatest Conservation Need".
