= Roughhead shiner =

Conservation status
- Vulnerable (IUCN 3.1)

Scientific classification
- Kingdom: Animalia
- Phylum: Chordata
- Class: Actinopterygii
- Order: Cypriniformes
- Family: Leuciscidae
- Subfamily: Pogonichthyinae
- Genus: Notropis
- Species: N. semperasper

Binomial name
- Notropis semperasper C. R. Gilbert, 1961

Species of fish

The roughhead shiner (Notropis semperasper) is a species of freshwater ray-finned fish beloinging to the family Leuciscidae, the shiners, daces and minnows. It is found only in the upper James River drainage, Virginia, USA.

In March 2022, the Center for Biological Diversity petitioned the U.S. Fish and Wildlife Service to list the roughhead shiner as endangered.

== Sources ==
- Roughhead shiner on FishBase
