= Barbara Reagan =

American economist

Barbara Benton Reagan
- Born: Barbara Benton; May 31, 1920; San Antonio, Texas
- Died: December 9, 2002 (aged 82); Dallas, Texas
- Education: Mary Baldwin College; University of Texas at Austin; American University; Harvard University
- Known for: founding member of the Committee on the Status of Women in the Economics Profession
- Awards: M Award for Service to SMU (1972); Outstanding Teacher SMU (1972); Willis M. Tate for Outstanding Faculty Member (1982); Dallas Outstanding Women-Helping-Women Award (1980); American Association of University Women Laurel Award (1983)
- Scientific career
- Fields: Economics
- Workplaces: Texas Women's University; Southern Methodist University
- Doctoral advisor: John D. Black

Barbara Reagan (1920–2002) was an American economist. From 1967 - 1990, she was a professor at the Southern Methodist University, Dallas, Texas. Her areas of specialization included analysis and methodology of national surveys of income and expenditure, labour migration of African and Mexican Americans, and occupational segregation by sex and factors affecting women's labour supply. She was a founding member of the Committee on the Status of Women in the Economics Profession. After her retirement from Southern Methodist University, she was a director of the American Savings Bank and The Texas Guaranteed Student Loan Corporation. Her daughter, Patricia Reagan, is also a professor of economics.

== Selected publications ==
- Martha Blaxall; Barbara Benton Reagan (1976). Women and the Workplace: The Implications of Occupational Segregation. University of Chicago Press. ISBN 978-0-226-05822-1. OCLC 2303332.
- Reagan, B. B. (1975). Two supply curves for economists? Implications of mobility and career attachment of women. The American Economic Review, 65(2), 100–107.JSTOR 1818839
