= Pygmy shiner =

Scientific classification
- Kingdom: Animalia
- Phylum: Chordata
- Class: Actinopterygii
- Order: Cypriniformes
- Family: Leuciscidae
- Genus: Notropis
- Species: N. tropicus

Binomial name
- Notropis tropicus C. L. Hubbs & R. R. Miller, 1975

Species of fish

The pygmy shiner (Notropis tropicus) is a species of freshwater ray-finned fish beloinging to the family Leuciscidae, the shiners, daces and minnows. It is endemic to the Pánuco River basin in east–central Mexico. Its type locality is Tamesí River at Llera in the state of Tamaulipas. It is a small species, less than 4 cm (1.6 in) in standard length.
