= Bedrock shiner =

Conservation status
- Least Concern (IUCN 3.1)

Scientific classification
- Kingdom: Animalia
- Phylum: Chordata
- Class: Actinopterygii
- Division: Teleostei
- Order: Cypriniformes
- Family: Leuciscidae
- Subfamily: Pogonichthyinae
- Genus: Notropis
- Species: N. rupestris

Binomial name
- Notropis rupestris Page, 1987

Species of fish

The bedrock shiner (Notropis rupestris) is a species of freshwater ray-finned fish beloinging to the family Leuciscidae, the shiners, daces and minnows. It is endemic to the United States, where it inhabits the lower Caney Fork system and nearby tributaries of the central Cumberland River drainage in Tennessee.

It has an elongated body, a black stripe around its snout and base, a slender body, an arched nape and a dorsal fin.
