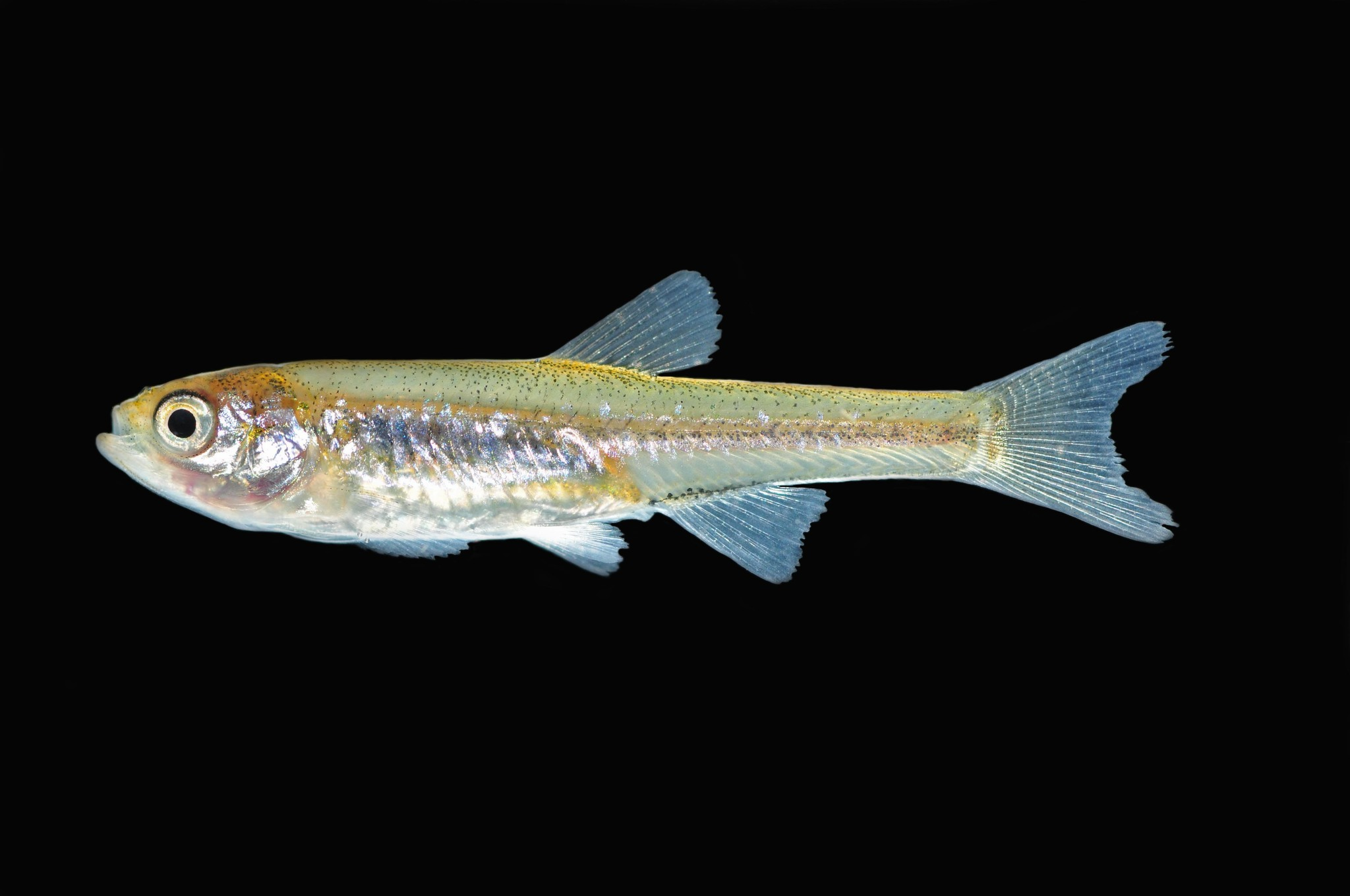

Conservation status
- Least Concern (IUCN 3.1)

Scientific classification
- Kingdom: Animalia
- Phylum: Chordata
- Class: Actinopterygii
- Order: Cypriniformes
- Family: Leuciscidae
- Subfamily: Pogonichthyinae
- Genus: Notropis
- Species: N. jemezanus

Binomial name
- Notropis jemezanus (Cope, 1875)

Synonyms
- Alburnellus jemezanus Cope, 1875; Notropis santarosaliae Meek, 1902

= Rio Grande shiner =

Species of fish

The Rio Grande shiner (Notropis jemezanus) is a species of freshwater ray-finned fish in the family Leuciscidae, the shiners, daces and minnows. It is found in Mexico and the United States.
