= Rocky shiner =

Conservation status
- Data Deficient (IUCN 3.1)

Scientific classification
- Kingdom: Animalia
- Phylum: Chordata
- Class: Actinopterygii
- Order: Cypriniformes
- Family: Leuciscidae
- Subfamily: Pogonichthyinae
- Genus: Notropis
- Species: N. suttkusi

Binomial name
- Notropis suttkusi Humphries & Cashner, 1994

Species of fish

The rocky shiner (Notropis suttkusi) is a species of freshwater ray-finned fish beloinging to the family Leuciscidae, the shiners, daces and minnows. It is endemic to the United States where the species is known from tributaries of the Red River draining the Ouachita Mountains in southeastern Oklahoma and southwestern Arkansas, including several localities in the Kiamichi, Little and Muddy Boggy rivers. Its range extends west to the Blue River in Oklahoma, and east to the Cossatot River in Arkansas.
