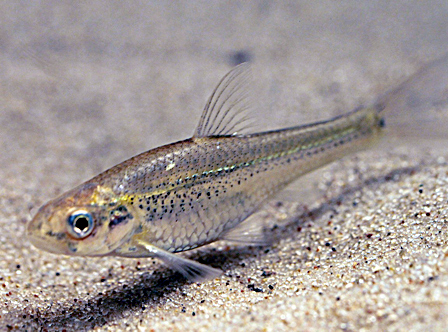

Conservation status
- Vulnerable (IUCN 3.1)

- Threatened (ESA)

Scientific classification
- Kingdom: Animalia
- Phylum: Chordata
- Class: Actinopterygii
- Order: Cypriniformes
- Family: Leuciscidae
- Subfamily: Pogonichthyinae
- Genus: Notropis
- Species: N. girardi

Binomial name
- Notropis girardi C. L. Hubbs & Ortenburger, 1929

= Arkansas River shiner =

Species of fish

The Arkansas River shiner (Notropis girardi) is a species of freshwater ray-finned fish beloinging to the family Leuciscidae, the shiners, daces and minnows. It is native to part of the central United States. Historically this shiner was widespread and abundant throughout the western portions of the Arkansas River basin in Kansas, New Mexico, Oklahoma, and Texas. It is extirpated from the River in Kansas and Oklahoma. Recently, the species was almost entirely confined to about 820 km (510 mi) of the Canadian River in Oklahoma, Texas, and New Mexico, but it has been introduced and is now widely established in Pecos River in New Mexico.
