= Sandbar shiner =

Conservation status
- Least Concern (IUCN 3.1)

Scientific classification
- Kingdom: Animalia
- Phylum: Chordata
- Class: Actinopterygii
- Order: Cypriniformes
- Family: Leuciscidae
- Subfamily: Pogonichthyinae
- Genus: Notropis
- Species: N. scepticus

Binomial name
- Notropis scepticus (D. S. Jordan & C. H. Gilbert, 1883)

Synonyms
- Minnilus scepticus Jordan & Gilbert, 1883

Species of fish

The sandbar shiner (Notropis scepticus) is a species of freshwater ray-finned fish beloinging to the family Leuciscidae, the shiners, daces and minnows.

It is endemic to the Southeastern United States.

It is native from the Cape Fear River drainage in North Carolina, to the Savannah River drainage in Georgia.
