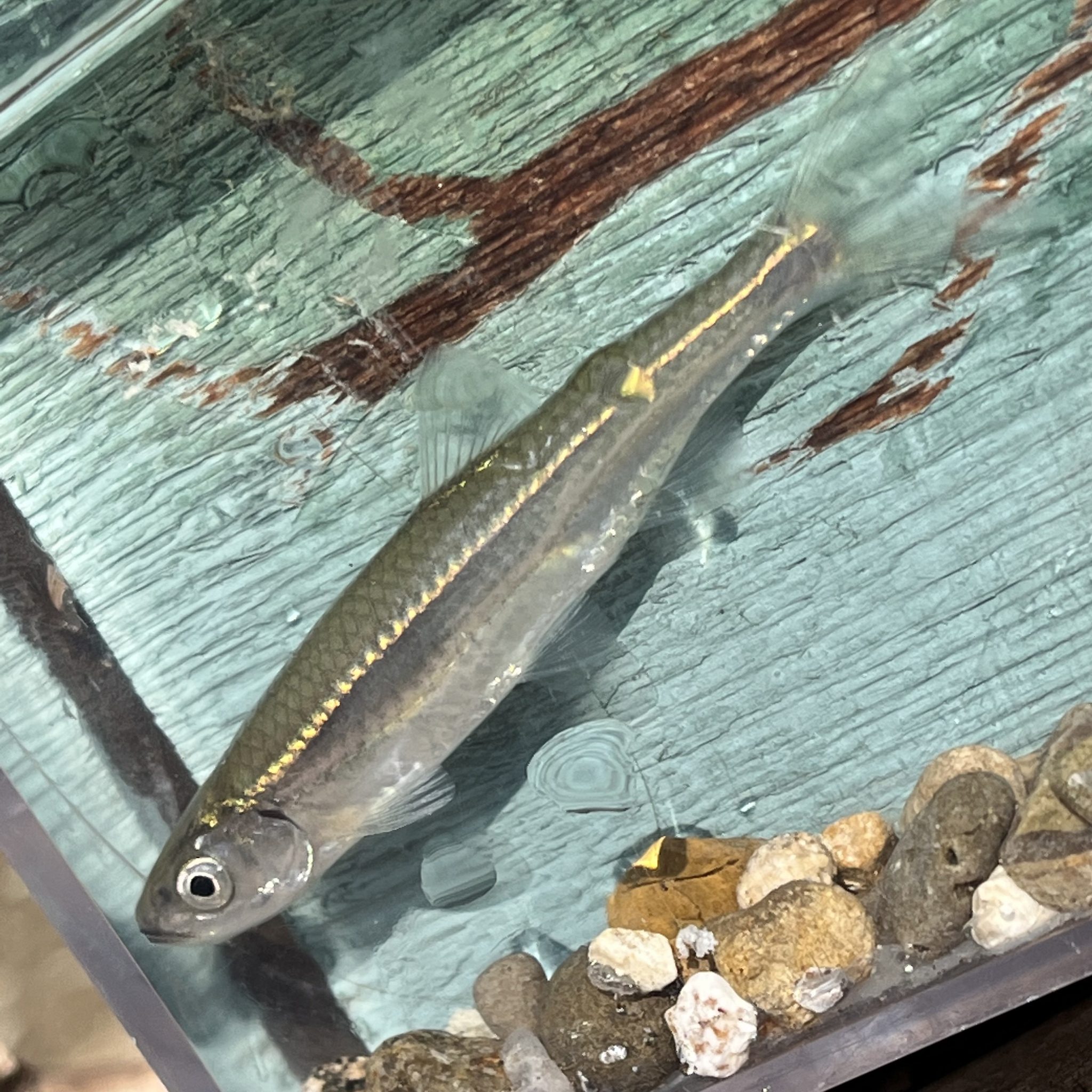
- Emerald shiner (Notropis atherinoides)

Scientific classification
- Kingdom: Animalia
- Phylum: Chordata
- Class: Actinopterygii
- Order: Cypriniformes
- Family: Leuciscidae
- Subfamily: Pogonichthyinae
- Genus: Notropis; Rafinesque, 1818

Type species
- Notropis atherinoides Rafinesque 1818

Synonyms
- Alburnellus Girard, 1856; Alburnops Girard, 1856; Azteca D. S. Jordan & Evermann, 1896; Aztecula D. S. Jordan & Evermann, 1898; Chriope D. S. Jordan, 1878; Episema Cope & D. S. Jordan, 1877; Erinemus D. S. Jordan, 1876; Minnilus Rafinesque, 1820; Nazatexico Whitley, 1931; Nototropis D. S. Jordan, 1877; Opsopoea D. S. Jordan & Evermann, 1898; Orcella D. S. Jordan & Evermann, 1896; Orcula D. S. Jordan & Evermann, 1900; Paranotropis Fowler 1904; Photogenis Cope, 1867

= Notropis =

Genus of fishes

Notropis is a genus of freshwater ray-finned fish in the family Leuciscidae, the shiners, daces and minnows. They are known commonly as eastern shiners. They are native to North America, and are one of the continent's most speciose genera.

A 1997 phylogenetic analysis placed the genus in a clade with Campostoma, Cyprinella, Phenacobius, Platygobio and Rhinichthys. The systematics of the genus is still unclear. It has not been confirmed to be monophyletic. While it has been divided into several subgenera and species groups, the relationships between the taxa are not yet understood.

== Characteristics ==
Members of the genus Notropis have eight dorsal rays and have no barbels. Scales for most species are not usually that much taller than they are wide. Their scales are usually not diamond shaped.

Their intestines are short and usually have one loop at the front.

== Species ==
These are the currently recognized species in this genus:

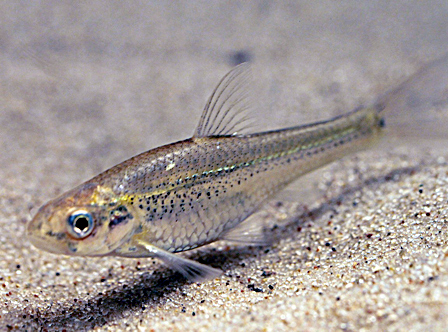
Notropis girardi

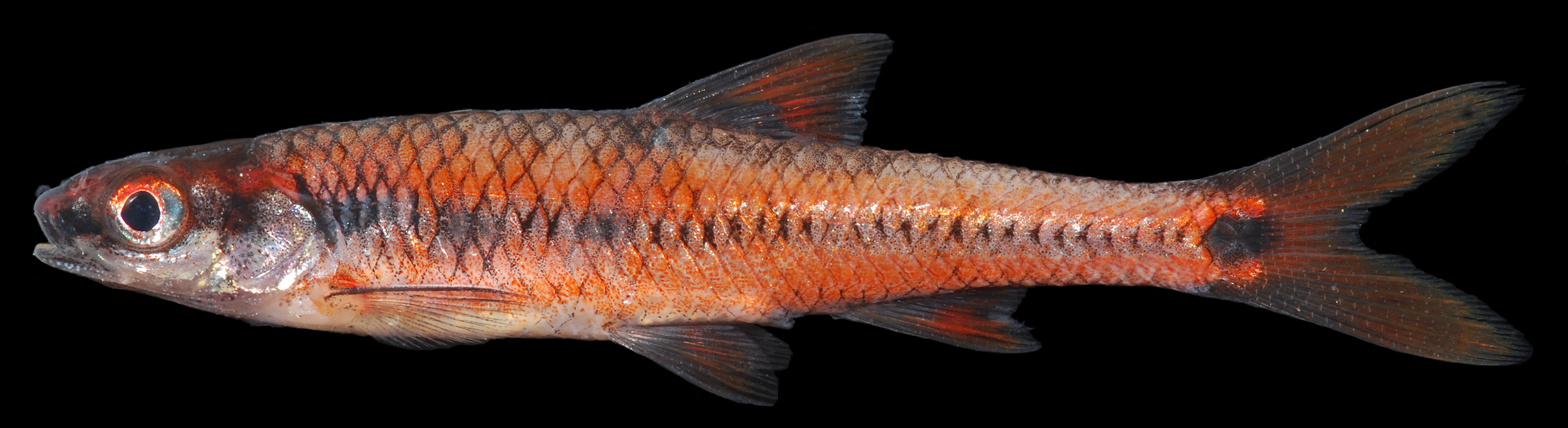
Notropis maculatus

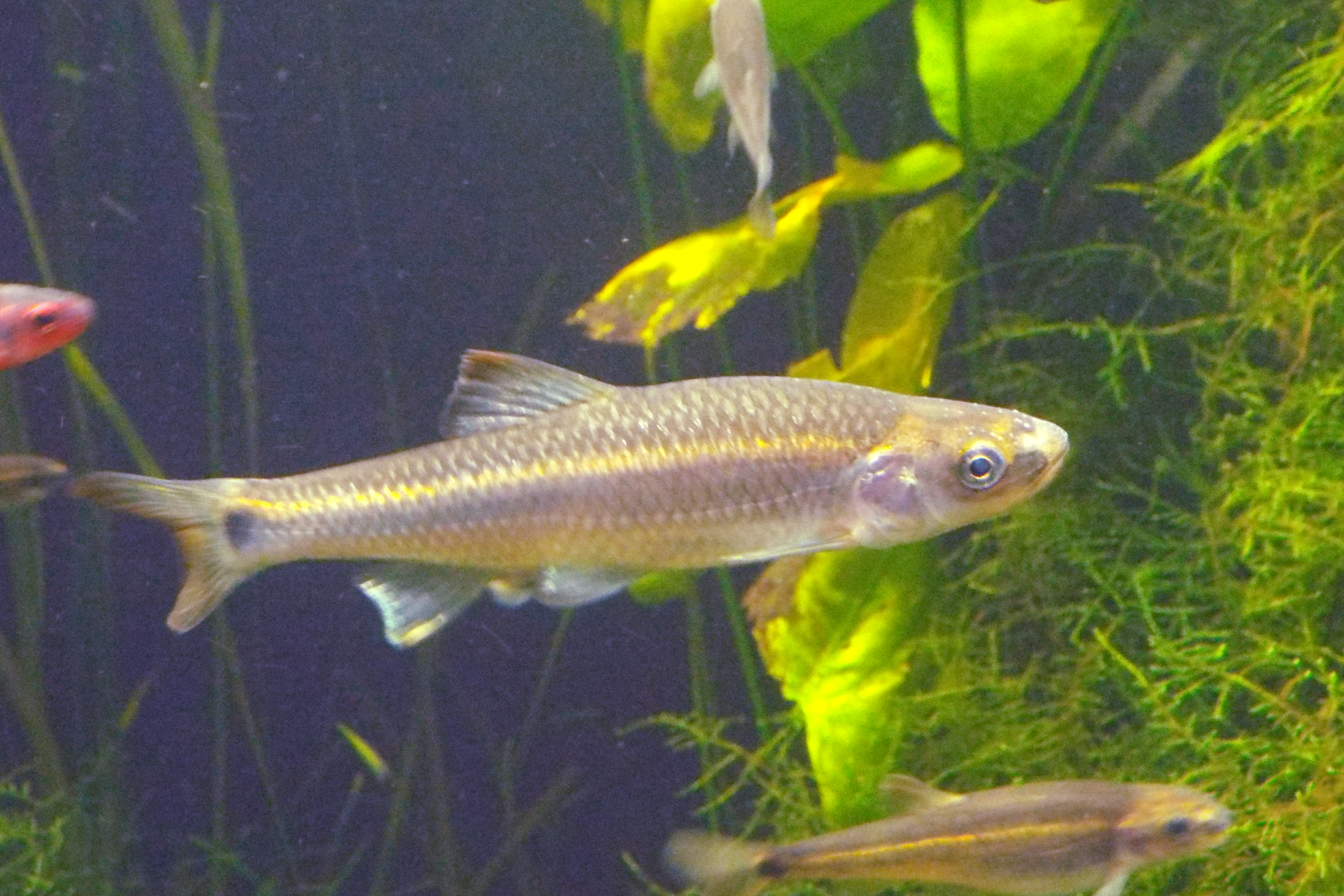
Notropis stilbius

- Notropis amabilis (Girard, 1856) (Texas shiner)
- Notropis amecae Chernoff & R. R. Miller, 1986 (Ameca shiner)
- Notropis anogenus S. A. Forbes, 1885 (Pugnose shiner)
- Notropis ariommus (Cope, 1867) (Popeye shiner)
- Notropis atherinoides Rafinesque, 1818 (Emerald shiner)
- Notropis atrocaudalis Evermann, 1892 (Blackspot shiner)
- Notropis bairdi C. L. Hubbs & Ortenburger, 1929 (Red River shiner)
- Notropis bifrenatus (Cope, 1867) (Bridle shiner)
- Notropis buccula F. B. Cross, 1953 (Smalleye shiner)
- Notropis girardi C. L. Hubbs & Ortenburger, 1929 (Arkansas River shiner)
- Notropis heterolepis C. H. Eigenmann & R. S. Eigenmann, 1893 (Blacknose shiner)
- Notropis jemezanus (Cope, 1875) (Rio Grande shiner)
- Notropis maculatus (O. P. Hay, 1881) (Taillight shiner)
- Notropis megalops Girard, 1856) (West Texas shiner)
- Notropis mekistocholas Snelson, 1971 (Cape Fear shiner)
- Notropis micropteryx (Cope, 1868) (Highland shiner)
- Notropis oxyrhynchus C. L. Hubbs & Bonham, 1951 (Sharpnose shiner)
- Notropis percobromus (Cope, 1871) (Carmine shiner)
- Notropis perpallidus C. L. Hubbs & J. D. Black, 1940 (Peppered shiner)
- Notropis photogenis (Cope, 1865) (Silver shiner)
- Notropis rafinesquei Suttkus, 1991 (Yazoo shiner)
- Notropis rubellus (Agassiz, 1850) (Rosyface shiner)
- Notropis rupestris Page, 1987 (Bedrock shiner)
- †Notropis saladonis C. L. Hubbs & C. Hubbs, 1958 (Salado shiner)
- Notropis scepticus (D. S. Jordan & C. H. Gilbert, 1883) (Sandbar shiner)
- Notropis semperasper C. R. Gilbert, 1961 (Roughhead shiner)
- Notropis stilbius D. S. Jordan, 1877 (Silverstripe shiner)
- Notropis suttkusi Humphries & Cashner, 1994 (Rocky shiner)
- Notropis telescopus (Cope, 1868) (Telescope shiner)
- Notropis tropicus C. L. Hubbs & R. R. Miller, 1975 (Pygmy shiner)
