= Salado shiner =

Conservation status
- Extinct (yes) (IUCN 3.1)

Scientific classification
- Kingdom: Animalia
- Phylum: Chordata
- Class: Actinopterygii
- Order: Cypriniformes
- Family: Leuciscidae
- Subfamily: Pogonichthyinae
- Genus: Notropis
- Species: †N. saladonis

Binomial name
- †Notropis saladonis C. L. Hubbs & C. Hubbs, 1958

Extinct species of fish

The Salado shiner (Notropis saladonis) is an extinct species of ray-finned fish beloinging to the family Leuciscidae, the shiners, daces and minnows. It was found only in the Rio Salado, a tributary of the Rio Grande in northern Mexico. It was locally known as sardinita de salado.

== Sources ==
- Salado shiner on FishBase
