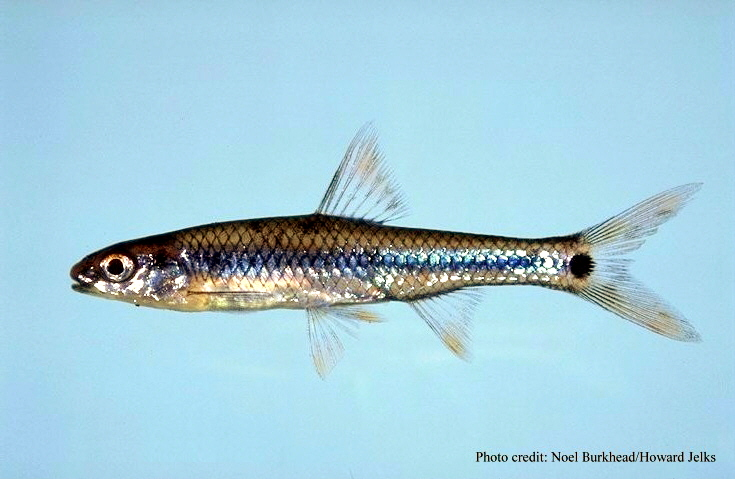

Conservation status
- Least Concern (IUCN 3.1)

Scientific classification
- Kingdom: Animalia
- Phylum: Chordata
- Class: Actinopterygii
- Order: Cypriniformes
- Family: Leuciscidae
- Subfamily: Pogonichthyinae
- Genus: Notropis
- Species: N. maculatus

Binomial name
- Notropis maculatus (O. P. Hay, 1881)

Synonyms
- Hemitremia maculata O. P. Hay, 1881; Opsopoeodus bollmani Gilbert, 1891; Notropis louisae Fowler, 1940; Notropis burchi Fowler, 1942

= Taillight shiner =

Species of fish

The taillight shiner (Notropis maculatus) is a species of freshwater ray-finned fish in the family Leuciscidae, the shiners, daces and minnows. It is commonly found in the south-eastern USA.

== Distribution and habitat ==
The taillight shiner is found in the lower Mississippi River basin, parts of Cape Fear River in North Carolina, Sabine River in Texas, and throughout Florida, with the exception of the southern tip. Their habitat consists of shallow, slow moving pools, rivers, lakes or swamps, usually containing some aquatic plant life. They have been classified as least concern by the IUCN due to their wide distribution and large populations.

== Appearance and behaviour ==
The taillight shiner has a long thin body and a rounded snout. Adult fish are typically 2–2.5 inches long. They have pale yellow colouring on their back, silvery white colouring on their belly and silvery stripes on their sides. They have a black spot at the base of their tail fin. During breeding season, the males have blackish colouring on the fins, and are suffused with pink or red on body, head and fins.

It is a schooling species that feeds on crustaceans, insects and algae. It completes its entire life cycle in one year. Spawning begins in March, extends into early October and occurs near logs or similar objects. They prefer to spawn in water temperatures of 23–32 °C (73–90 °F). They reach maturity in 6–9 months, depending on the water temperature at the time of spawning. The female will typically lay between 72 and 408 eggs. They have been observed to occasionally practice oral grasping behaviour in order to maintain stationary in flowing water.
