= Willard Cochrane =

American economist (1914–2012)

Willard W. Cochrane
- Born: May 15, 1914; Fresno, California
- Died: March 5, 2012 (aged 97); Oak Park Heights, Minnesota

Academic background
- Education: Harvard University
- Doctoral advisor: John D. Black

Academic work
- Discipline: Agricultural economics

Willard Wesley Cochrane (May 15, 1914 – March 5, 2012) was an agricultural economist and a leading architect of farm policy in the United States.

He was born in 1914 in California and went on to earn degrees at the University of California, Berkeley, Montana State University and Harvard University, where he received his Ph.D.

In the late 1930s and 1940s, he served in government and United Nations agricultural agencies. He served in the Navy during World War II. He became Professor of agricultural economics at the University of Minnesota in 1951.

During the 1960s he was U.S. Department of Agriculture's head agricultural economist under U.S. Secretary of Agriculture Orville Freeman. During this time he developed proposals for supply management policy and a national food stamp program.

He was an advocate of sustainable family farming and coined the concept of the technology treadmill. He was opposed to government commodity program payments and an early advocate of set aside programs to benefit conservation.

== Bibliography ==
Cochrane wrote a dozen books on farm policy. His last book, about sustainable family farming, was published in 2003.

- "The economics of consumption: Economics of decision making in the household" (1956), with Carolyn Shaw Bell
- "Farm Prices: Myth and Reality" (1958)
- "The City Man's Guide to the Farm Problem" (1965)
- "The World Food Problem A Guardedly Optimistic View" (1969)
- "Economics of American Agriculture" (1974), with Walter W. Wilcox & Robert W. Herdt
- "Agricultural Development Planning: Economic Concepts, Administrative Procedures and Political Processes" (1974)
- "American Farm Policy, 1948-73" (1976), with Mary E. Ryan
- "Agricultural Economics At The University Of Minnesota 1886- 1979" (1983)
- "The Long, Slow Slide Into Economic Mediocrity" (1991)
- "Reforming Farm Policy: Toward a National Agenda" (1992), with C. Ford Runge
- "The Development of American Agriculture: A Historical Analysis" (1993)
- "The Curse of American Agricultural Abundance: A Sustainable Solution" (2003)
