= Yazoo shiner =

Conservation status
- Least Concern (IUCN 3.1)

Scientific classification
- Kingdom: Animalia
- Phylum: Chordata
- Class: Actinopterygii
- Order: Cypriniformes
- Family: Leuciscidae
- Subfamily: Pogonichthyinae
- Genus: Notropis
- Species: N. rafinesquei

Binomial name
- Notropis rafinesquei Suttkus, 1991

Species of fish

The Yazoo shiner (Notropis rafinesquei) i is a species of freshwater ray-finned fish beloinging to the family Leuciscidae, the shiners, daces and minnows.

It is endemic to Mississippi in the Southeastern United States, where it inhabits the upper tributaries of the Yazoo River system.
