= John D. Black =

American economist

- Born: June 6, 1883; Cambridge, Wisconsin
- Died: April 12, 1960 (aged 76); Boston, Massachusetts

Academic background
- Education: University of Wisconsin
- Doctoral advisor: Benjamin Hibbard

Academic work
- Discipline: Agricultural economics
- Institutions: University of Minnesota; Harvard University
- Doctoral students: Marion Clawson; Willard Cochrane; Barbara Reagan

John Donald Black (June 6, 1883 – April 12, 1960) was an American economist. He was a professor of economics at University of Minnesota from 1918 to 1927, and then from 1927 to 1956 at Harvard University. Black was one of the authors of the Agricultural Adjustment Act. He was also president of the American Economic Association in 1955. Black died at a Boston hospital in 1960.

== Bibliography ==
- (1926) Production Economics. George G. Harrap and Co.
- (1942) Parity, parity, parity. The Harvard Committee on Research in the Social Sciences.
- (1944) Food Enough: Science for War and Peace Series. American Journal of Agricultural Economics.
- (1950) The Rural Economy of New England: A Regional Study. Harvard University Press. ASIN B0000CHSFH.
- (1951) Interregional Competition in Agriculture: With Special Reference to Dairy Farming in the Lake States and New England. Harvard Economic Studies. ISBN 9780674460508
- (1955) Farm and Other Operating-unit Land-use Planning.
- (1960) Rural Planning of One County: Worcester County, Massachusetts. The University of Chicago Press, Journal of Political Economy.
