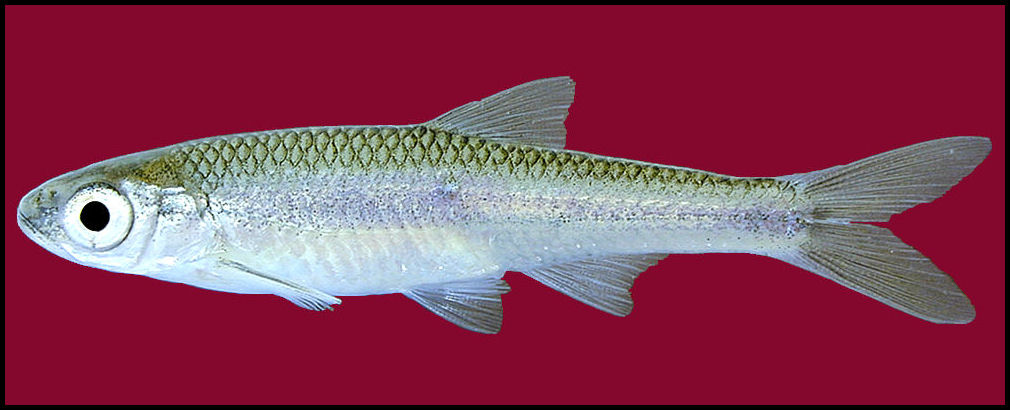
- from San Marcos River, Texas

Conservation status
- Least Concern (IUCN 3.1)

Scientific classification
- Kingdom: Animalia
- Phylum: Chordata
- Class: Actinopterygii
- Order: Cypriniformes
- Family: Leuciscidae
- Subfamily: Pogonichthyinae
- Genus: Notropis
- Species: N. amabilis

Binomial name
- Notropis amabilis (Girard, 1856)

Synonyms
- Alburnus amabilis Girard, 1856; Cyprinella macrostoma Girard, 1856

= Texas shiner =

Species of fish

The Texas shiner (Notropis amabilis) is a species of ray-finned fish in the genus Notropis. It is found in the Colorado River to Rio Grande drainage from Texas and northeastern Mexico and the Rio Salado and Rio San Juan systems in Mexico to the lower Pecos River in Texas.

== Habitat associations ==
Macrohabitat of the Texas shiner is typically springs and headwater tributaries, where may be very common; sometimes limited number occurring in larger streams. Collections from the Blanco River (Texas) and its tributaries found N. amabilis generally associated with flowing pools, deep runs, avoiding shallow high-velocity riffles and lentic backwater areas; abundant in deep pools and silt substrates, in fall; deeper pools and runs in fall and winter. Clear waters with substrate usually sand, gravel and rubble. Often found in moderately large schools in streams with moderately fast currents; can be found in the upstream ends of pools below riffle areas, in the swiftly moving waters along gravel bars and in moderately flowing pools; commonly found in areas below lower water dams and road crossings where turbulent water flows. Where sympatric with Cyprinella lutrensis and C. venusta, N. amabilis usually selects areas having a greater current velocity than the other two species and also tends to maintain school integrity to a greater extent than do the other two species. N. amabilis is rarely found in upstream portions of tributary creeks and is common in streams with significant spring flow components. N. amabilis is dependent upon currents; most often abundant in swift water areas, often swimming near the surface in eddies created by upstream obstructions and in dense schools in swift moving water. In the Devils River, Texas, taken pre-flood in habitats intermediate between channels and pools, shifting into riffles and riffle-like habitats after the flood; study indicated species adaptation to a flood-prone existence presumably typical of a desert stream.

== Biology ==
=== Spawning season ===
In Texas, February through September. Collection of specimens, in Texas, less than 20 mm (0.79 in) SL from mid-April to mid-December, suggests spawning begins in approximately late March and continues through approximately mid-November. In Mexico, N. amabilis evidently spawns over a protracted period from early spring into summer.

=== Fecundity ===
Oocyte diameters exhibited a trimodal distribution suggesting development of multiple cohorts throughout the spawning season. In October mature ovaries present in three of fourteen females collected; all ovaries classified as mature or resting in individuals collected in November and December. As early as January, 24% of females collected contained developing ovaries; mature ovaries first appeared in February in 17% of females; in April, 75% of females contained mature ovaries; May–July, mature ovaries found in 25-31% of females; reproduction peaked again in August and September when 86% and 71% of females, respectively, contained mature ovaries. Clutch size ranged from 102 to 286 with a mean (±SD) of 174.5 (62.2;).

=== Food Habits ===
Gut contents suggest species is an invertivore drift predator (Goldstein and Simon 1999) feeding primarily in the water column on aquatic insects. Common food items were aquatic insects (71%) and algae (61%); among aquatic insects, mayflies were most abundant (31% of insects), caddisflies (26%), flies/midges (22%), beatles (12%), and moths/butterflies (4%); terrestrial insects found in 6% of guts, comprising 5% of all insect taxa identified; sediment and detritus found in 13% of Notropis amabilis examined. In Devil's River, Texas, observed feeding near the surface. The few specimens collected contained terrestrial insects during the summer; no other information about the food habits is known.

=== Phylogeny and Paleobiogeography ===
In (Craig et al. 2017) "Texas Shiner is in the subgenus Notropis and its closest extant relatives are Rio Grande Shiner Notropis jemezanus, Sharpnose Shiner Notropis oxyrhynchus, and Emerald Shiner Notropis atherinoides (Bielawski and Gold, 2001). Although the paleobiogeography of Texas Shiner is currently unclear, a proposed pathway of speciation is that the subgenus Notropis ancestor gained access to the Pecos River from the north through historical connections with eastern flowing drainages of the Southern Great Plains during the Neogene (Conner and Suttkus, 1986) or Quaternary (Echelle and Echelle, 1978) periods. A later derived ancestor of Texas Shiner and its closest phylogenetic relative Rio Grande Shiner (Bielawski and Gold, 2001) were exchanged through Pleistocene connectivity between the Pecos River and Edwards Plateau drainages (e.g., Colorado River) and eventually the Rio Grande drainage (Echelle and Echelle, 1978). During Pleistocene interglacial climates, the ancestral form of Texas Shiner became isolated in refugia of persistent spring complexes within the Edwards Plateau drainages (Coburn, 1982)."

=== Population status ===
As of 2017, populations of the Texas Shiner are currently secure. From (Craig et al. 2017) "Populations of Texas Shiners were temporally stable or increasing in six streams or stream reaches (Bonner et al., 2005; Runyan, 2007; Perkin et al., 2010; Kollaus et al., 2015) with abundances categorized as occasional (7 to 22% in relative abundances) to frequent (30 to 37%) in 10 other streams or stream reaches among five drainages (Colorado River, Guadalupe River, San Antonio River, Nueces River, Pecos River, and Rio Grande). Texas Shiners are not reported recently in three streams or stream reaches. Lack of recent collection in the San Gabriel River (Brazos River drainage) might be attributed to extirpation events or incorrect listing of the Brazos River drainage as part of Texas Shiner's range. Historical occurrences of Texas Shiners in the Brazos River drainage are under review by others (Hendrickson and Cohen, pers. comm.). Lack of recent collection of Texas Shiners and other native fishes in urbanized Barton Creek (Colorado River drainage) is associated with instream and downstream dams and nonnative fishes (Labay et al., 2011). However, other spring-associated fishes (e.g., native Etheostoma lepidum and nonnative Astyanax mexicanus) persist in Barton Creek. Texas Shiners were reported in the upper San Antonio River, another urbanized stream reach, as recent as 2000 (Edwards et al., 2001), but specimens were not taken in 2012 to 2013 (Craig and Bonner, in review). Upper San Antonio River has long history of water quality and water quantity concerns, along with nonnative species introductions. Despite two possible extirpation events in urban streams and possibly a third in a Brazos River drainage, populations of Texas Shiner temporally persist with occasional and frequent abundances among multiple and independent streams, stream reaches, and drainages. Therefore, we conclude the conservation status of the Texas Shiner is currently secure.
