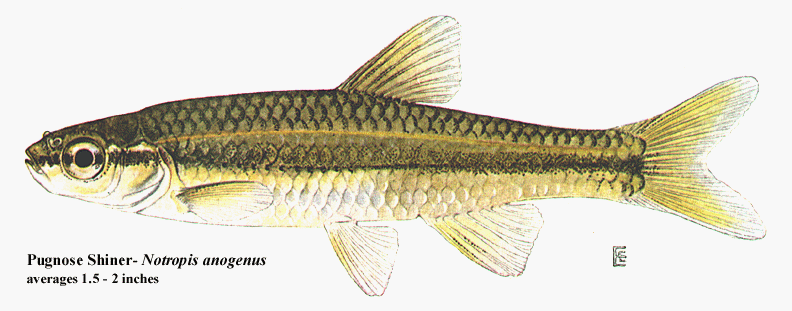

Conservation status
- Least Concern (IUCN 3.1)

Scientific classification
- Kingdom: Animalia
- Phylum: Chordata
- Class: Actinopterygii
- Order: Cypriniformes
- Family: Leuciscidae
- Subfamily: Pogonichthyinae
- Genus: Notropis
- Species: N. anogenus

Binomial name
- Notropis anogenus S. A. Forbes, 1885

Synonyms
- Hybopsis anogenus (Forbes, 1885)

= Pugnose shiner =

Species of fish

The pugnose shiner (Notropis anogenus) is a species of ray-finned fish in the genus Notropis. It is in the family Leuciscidae which consists of freshwater shiners, daces and minnows. Its distribution has been decreasing due to the removal of aquatic plants in order to create swimming beaches and boating access in freshwater lakes and is now mostly found in Minnesota, Wisconsin, and Michigan.

== Distribution ==
The pugnose shiner is a non-abundant species of Notropis and within the United States, it is distributed across parts of Minnesota, Wisconsin, and Michigan. It is native to North America and its historic range was from eastern Ontario and Western New York to North Dakota, Illinois, Indiana, and Ohio, ending in the St. Lawrence River drainage. The population that was once in North Dakota is now thought to be extirpated due to turbidity and uprooted vegetation within the freshwater lakes and streams. This minnow can also be found in a few areas of Canada but those ranges have also decreased throughout time so now the Canadian population mostly lies within Ontario.

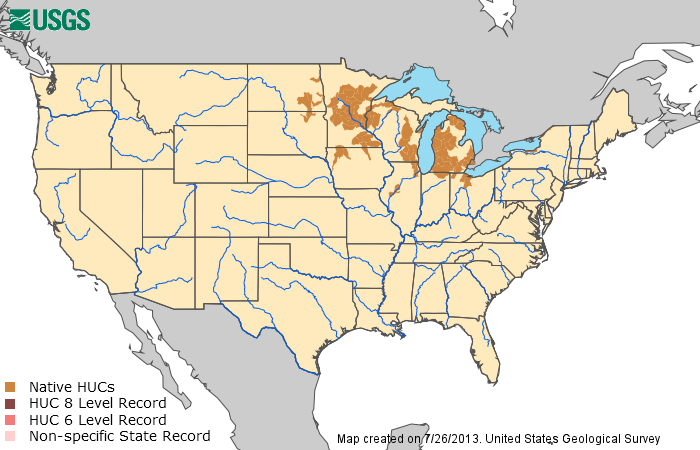
Pugnose shiner (Notropis anogenus) distribution map

== Description ==
The pugnose shiner is a type of minnow that can live for up to 3 years and is able to reach sizes between 20–60mm, although it is about 47mm on average. It has a lateral dark stripe on the side of its body that runs from the tip of the caudal fin, through the eye, and to the nose tip. It has a small, terminal mouth angled upwards, giving it the pug-nose appearance. The abdominal region is yellow, and it has a clear-colored tail fin. Each fish has about 34–37 round, silver cycloid scales covering its body which has a fusiform shape to help the pugnose shiner swim against the constant stream currents. The pelvic fins are in the abdominal position. Because it is a ray-finned species, the fin rays are used as elements to support the skeletal features. The pugnose shiner has an 8-rayed dorsal fin on top of the dusky-colored back, a feature separating it from the pugnose minnow. This fish is also the only Minnesota Notropis species that has a darkly pigmented peritoneum.

== Ecology ==
Although it is not an abundant species, the pugnose shiner can be found inhabiting weedy, clear lakes and slow-moving streams throughout its temperate, freshwater range. When temperatures are warmer, this fish is found in shallow water but when it cools down in the winter months, it is found in waters as deep as 2 meters. The pugnose shiner is a great indicator for healthy ecosystems because it is very sensitive to its environment because it is intolerant to turbidity. Their diets tend to consist of filamentous algae and cladocera (water fleas), eggs, insects, worms, and anything else under 2mm. Their predators consist of any omnivorous fish that is larger than this shiner. They are mid to low level consumers and therefore take little part in the transfer of nutrients.

== Reproduction ==
The pugnose shiner reaches sexual maturity between the ages of 1 and 2 for both the male and female genders. They are an oviparous species and spawning and fertilization occur in summer between May and July. The female distributes her eggs in shallow water in areas of dense vegetation in which she lays between 530 and 1275 eggs. Once the eggs are fertilized, they generally hatch within one or two days. This species does not spend energy in parental investment so after the eggs are laid and fertilized, the male and female leave the eggs. In pugnose shiners, sexual dimorphism occurs and they have a polygynandrous mating system, meaning that both males and females have multiple mates. Sexes are physically different in that the males' pelvic fins go beyond the anal openings while the females' don't.

== Conservation status ==
The conservation status of the pugnose shiner has been changing quite a bit in the past few years. This is partly because its status is dependent on where the species population is. In Canada, the pugnose shiner is currently listed as endangered but the status varies by state in the United States. This species has been declining through the upper midwest because of turbidity, decreasing vegetation, and invasive species within its home. There are multiple subpopulations of pugnose shiner but there is limited connection between the different populations because of low dispersal potential. It was listed as Near Threatened in 2010 but as of 2014, the pugnose shiner has been of Least Concern status. It has patterns of population decline so it is continually on concern conservation attention.

== Etymology ==
The pugnose shiner genus name Notropis comes from Greek descent and it is a name given to shriveled-like specimens. It translates to the words "back keel". The species name anogenus is also from Greek descent and it translates to "without a chin".
