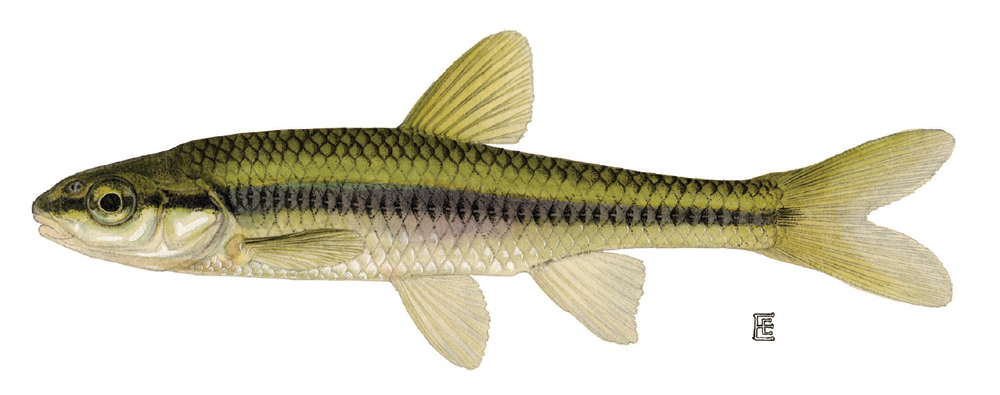

Conservation status
- Least Concern (IUCN 3.1)

Scientific classification
- Kingdom: Animalia
- Phylum: Chordata
- Class: Actinopterygii
- Order: Cypriniformes
- Family: Leuciscidae
- Subfamily: Pogonichthyinae
- Genus: Notropis
- Species: N. heterolepis

Binomial name
- Notropis heterolepis C. H. Eigenmann & R. S. Eigenmann, 1893

= Blacknose shiner =

Species of fish

The blacknose shiner (Notropis heterolepis) is a species of freshwater ray-finned fish belonging to the family Leuciscidae, the shiners, daces and minnows. This species is found in North America.

== Description ==
The blacknose shiner is a soft-rayed species up to 9.8 cm with toothless jaws, but gill arches that contain one or two rows of distinctive teeth. It has cycloid scales, but a scaleless head. There are 19 caudal rays, and the dorsal and anal fins are very short. The anal fin is closer to the middle of the body than to the caudal fin. Usually, it is a murky yellow on the dorsal side with a pale underside. There are two long, lateral stripes on the fish along the center of the body, and on the dorsal side of the fish.

== Distribution and habitat ==
The blacknose shiner ranges from the Atlantic, Great Lakes, Hudson Bay, and Mississippi River north to Nova Scotia and Saskatchewan, south to Ohio, Illinois, south-central Missouri. It is more prevalent in the northern sections of its range, and seems to be disappearing in the southern portions; it was last collected in Ohio in 1982. It lives typically in cool weedy creeks, small rivers, and lakes over sand.
