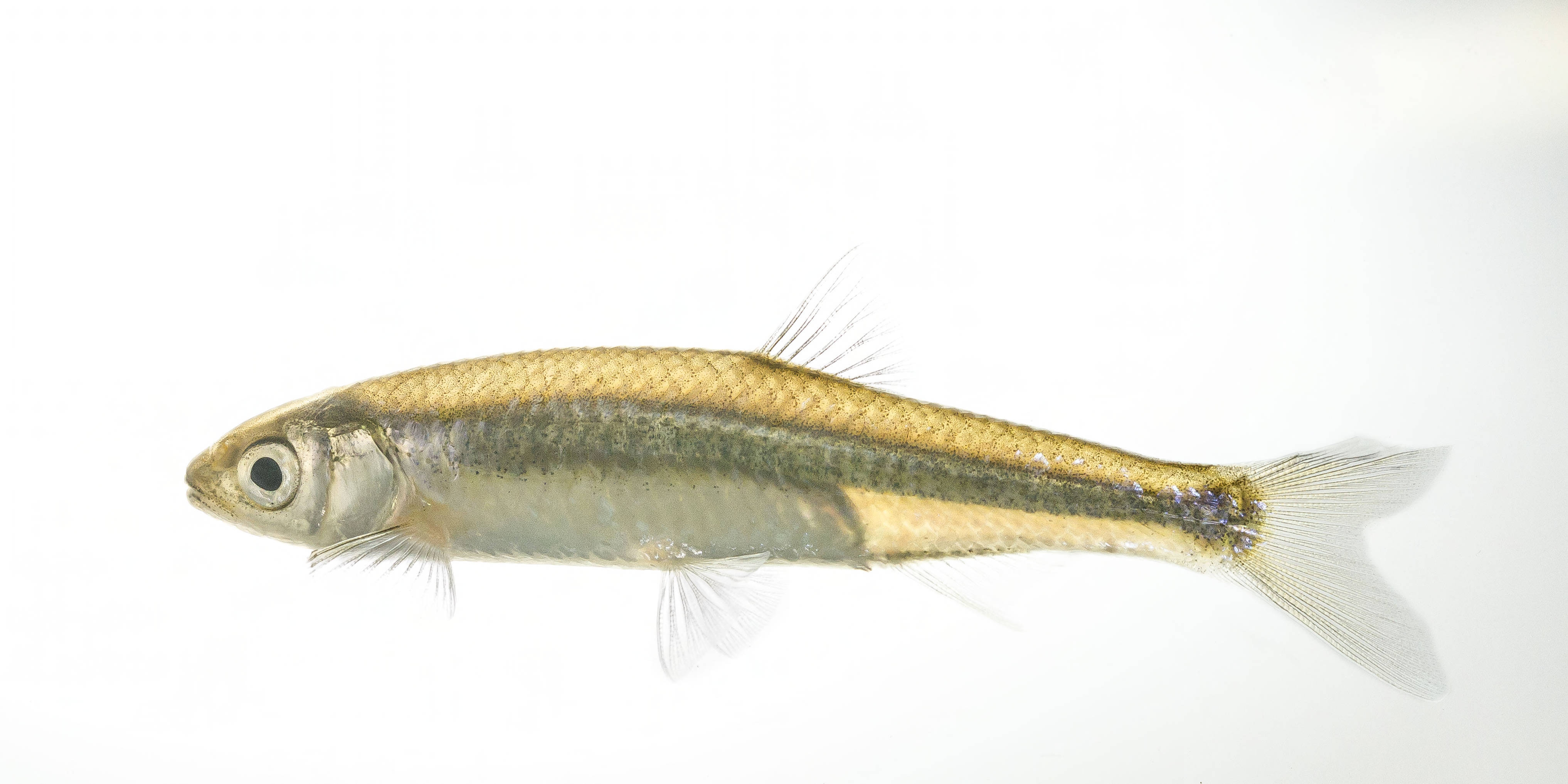

Conservation status
- Least Concern (IUCN 3.1)

Scientific classification
- Kingdom: Animalia
- Phylum: Chordata
- Class: Actinopterygii
- Division: Teleostei
- Order: Cypriniformes
- Family: Leuciscidae
- Subfamily: Pogonichthyinae
- Genus: Notropis
- Species: N. atherinoides

Binomial name
- Notropis atherinoides Rafinesque, 1818

Synonyms
- Minnilus dinemus Rafinesque, 1820; Alburnus nitidus Kirtland, 1854; Alburnus acutus Lapham, 1854; Alburnus dilectus Girard, 1856; Alburnus lepidulus Girard, 1856; Alburnus oligaspis Cope, 1865; Alburnellus jaculus Cope, 1867; Leuciscus copii Günther, 1868; Notropis louisianae Evermann, 1898

= Emerald shiner =

Species of fish

The emerald shiner (Notropis atherinoides) is a species of freshwater ray-finned fish belonging to the family Leuciscidae, the shiners, daces and minnows. The identifying characteristic of the emerald shiner is the silvery emerald color on its sides. It is found across North America from Canada to the Gulf of Mexico, commonly in large, deep lakes and rivers, though sometimes in smaller bodies of water as well. It feeds on small organisms such as zooplankton and insects, congregating in large groups near the surface of the water. It is a quite common fish and is often used as a bait fish.

== Distribution ==
Emerald shiners are native to North America; they are widely distributed throughout Canada, and south to Virginia and Texas. They range to the gulf coast from Texas to Alabama, and are especially prevalent in the Mississippi Basin. Emerald shiners are most likely the most abundant fish in the Mississippi.

== Physical description ==
=== Length ===
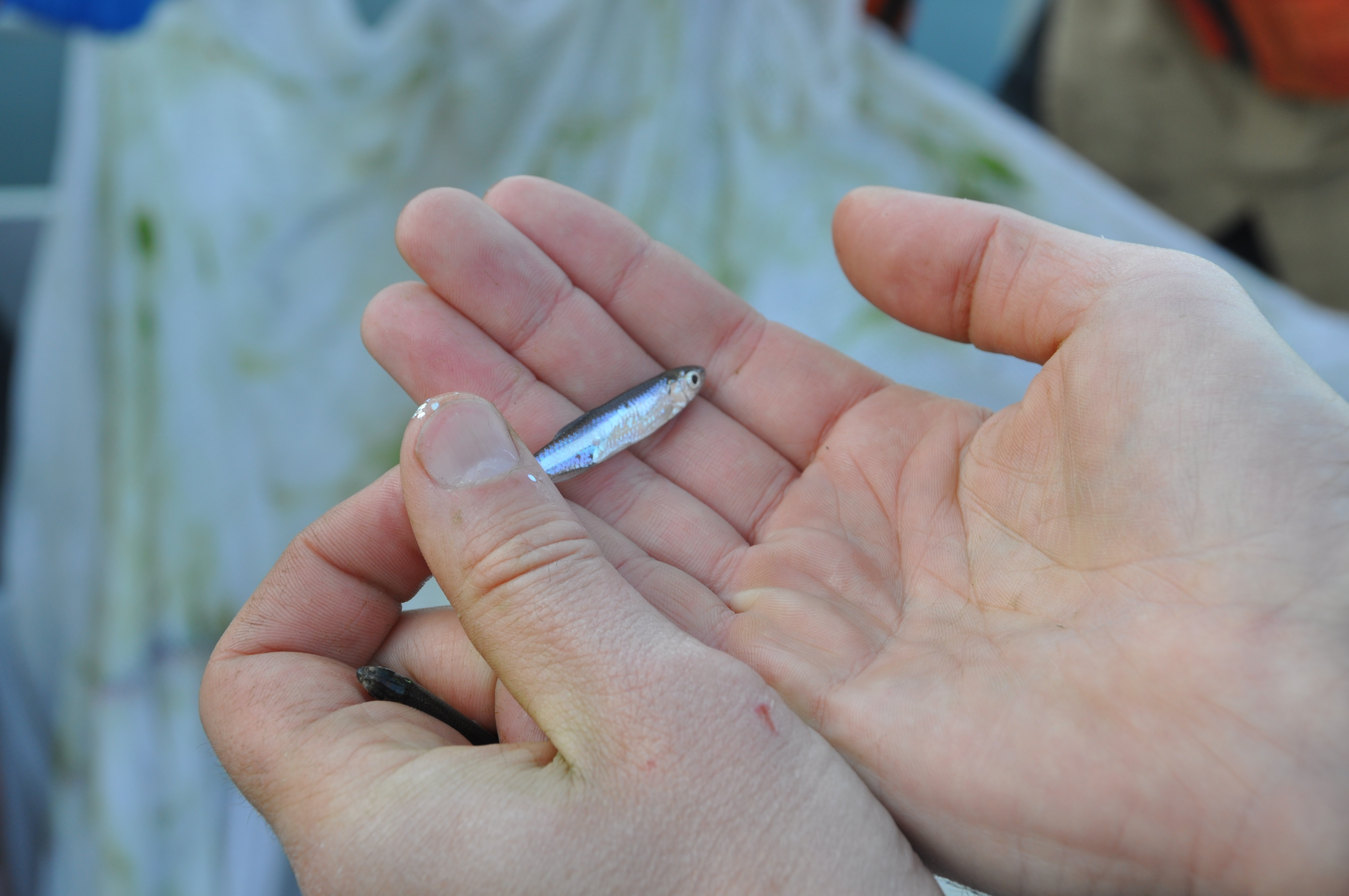

Maximum size is 89–127 millimetres (3.5–5.0 in). Females are larger than males.

=== Coloration ===
Live emerald shiners are a bright, iridescent, silvery green with a silver mid-lateral band. The back and upper sides are emerald greenish to straw colored, and the ventral side of the fish is a silvery white color. The dorsal scales have pigmented margins and clear centers. The area between the nostril and the eye lacks pigment, and the lips are pigmented medially and continues to halfway down the midline of the lower jaw. The dorsal, caudal, and leading rays of the pectoral fins are lined with pigment, but the remaining fin rays and membranes are clear. The underside of the opercle are gray. There are no nuptial colors exhibited by either sex.

=== Body morphology ===
Shiners have a slender, laterally flattened, and compressed body type. The dorsal fin is transparent, with eight rays located right behind the insertion of the pelvic fins. They have 9 to 12 anal fin rays, 35 to 43 lateral line scales, 19 to 20 pre-dorsal scale rows, 14 to 16 pectoral fin rays, and 8 or 9 pelvic fin rays. The mouth is large and in the terminal and oblique position, and does not have a barbel. The pharyngeal teeth are hooked, and are in a 2, 4–4, 2 or 1, 4–4, 1 pattern. Shiners have a short and blunt snout, and the upper lip is separated from the skin of the snout by a deep groove that is continuous across the midline. The cartilaginous ridge of the lower jaw is not very evident.

== Habitat ==
Living in freshwater, emerald shiners are benthopelagic. They live in large open rivers, lakes, and reservoirs. In medium-sized habitats the temperature preference for the shiner is 25 °C (77 °F), and they are tolerant of low oxygen levels. It is a midwater or near-surface species that usually lives in large or moderately sized schools. Some shiners are tolerant of turbidity in streams, but others avoid turbid streams. They are most commonly seen in clear water over sand or gravel.

== Diet habits ==
Shiners are planktivores, feeding on a variety of zooplankton, protozoans and diatoms. They move with a planktonic food source up toward the surface at dusk, and move back down at dawn. Both aquatic and terrestrial insects obtained at the surface of the water are a small portion of their diet. Algae and plants are also eaten, during spring especially.

== Importance to humans ==
Emerald shiners are used for fishing bait, especially for winter fishing because of the shiner's hardiness in cold weather. They are also an important resource for other animals to forage. The glistening sides of the shiner, along with its graceful movements make it a good aquarium fish.

== Conservation status ==
Currently, this species is of relatively low conservation concern and does not require significant additional protection or major management, monitoring, or research action. The IUCN Red List status of the emerald shiner is of least concern. Other than being caught for use in fish bait, emerald shiners are preyed upon by birds (gulls, terns, mergansers, cormorants) and fishes.

== Life span ==
The maximum reported age of emerald shiners is four to five years. Females live longer than males, and all older fish that have been found were female.

== Reproduction ==
Emerald shiners are oviparous. Females have been known to spawn anywhere from late spring (mid-May) to late summer (mid-August). Spawning is temperature dependent, and begins around 22.2 °C (72.0 °F). This is known as the threshold temperature. In Canada, females have been found to spawn in temperatures ranging from 20.1 to 23.2 °C (68.2 to 73.8 °F). Emerald shiners tend to spawn near the surface in open water near boulders and gravel shoals. Eggs usually hatch between 24 and 32 hours. They are pelagic spawners with numerous buoyant eggs that have none or poorly-developed respiratory organs, and little pigment.

Spawning occurs at night, about 1 to 2 feet below the surface, milling and darting in a circular path. Smaller males tend to pursue larger females, and the pairs swim together in a circle. The male presses closely on one side of the female, interlocking pectoral fins and gyrating. The female then rolls over and eggs are released for the male to fertilize. Males are mature at 55–60 mm, and females at 65 mm.

== Etymology of name ==
Notropis, comes from the Greek noton, meaning "back keel". The species name atherinoides comes from the Greek atherina, meaning silverside; and from the Greek suffix oides, meaning resemblance.

== Trivia ==
Emerald shiners resemble members of the silverside family, hence the species name atherinoides, silverside-like. This is in reference to the Old World silverside family.

Other common names include: Buckery shiner, common emerald shiner, lake shiner, lake silver side, plains shiner, river emerald shiner, shiner.

Plains shiner (Notropis percobromus) was recently incorporated into the emerald shiner species designation.
