= Escambia =

Escambia may refer to:

- Escambia County, Alabama
- Escambia County, Florida
- Escambia River, a river in Florida
- Fusconaia escambia, a mollusc
- Escambia Bay, a bay in Florida
- Escambia Bay Bridge, a bridge in Florida

== Ships ==
- Escambia class fleet oiler
- SS Escambia, a steam ship registered in Liverpool
- USS Escambia
