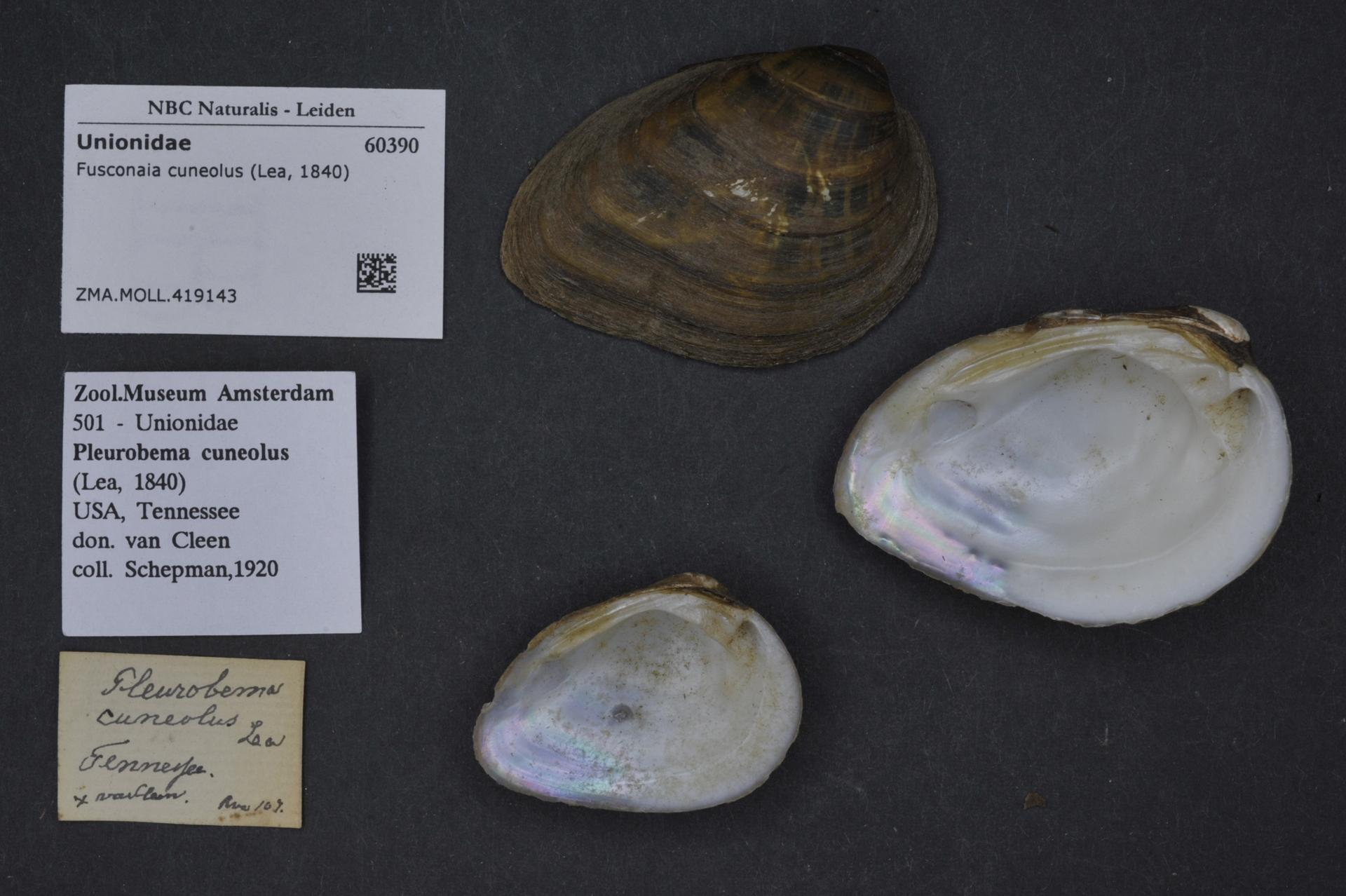

Conservation status
- Endangered (IUCN 3.1)
- CITES Appendix I (CITES)

Scientific classification
- Kingdom: Animalia
- Phylum: Mollusca
- Class: Bivalvia
- Order: Unionida
- Family: Unionidae
- Genus: Fusconaia
- Species: F. cuneolus

Binomial name
- Fusconaia cuneolus (Lea, 1840)

Synonyms
- Unio cuneolus Lea, 1840; Unio appressus Lea, 1871; Unio tuscumbiensis Lea, 1871; Unio flavidus Lea, 1872

= Fusconaia cuneolus =

Species of bivalve

Fusconaia cuneolus, the fine-rayed pigtoe pearly mussel or fine-rayed pigtoe, is a species of bivalve in the family Unionidae. It is native to Tennessee, Alabama, and Virginia in the United States, in each of which its population has declined severely. It is a federally listed endangered species of the United States.

Like other freshwater mussels, this species reproduces by releasing its larvae, or glochidia, into the water where they make their way into the bodies of fish. There they develop into juvenile mussels. Fish hosts for this mussel include fathead minnow (Pimephales promelas); river chub (Nocomis micropogon); stoneroller (Campostoma anomalum); telescope shiner (Notropis telescopus); Tennessee shiner (Notropis leuciodus); white shiner (Luxilus albeolus); whitetail shiner (Cyprinella galactura); and the mottled sculpin (Cottus bairdi).

There is only one large population which is located in the Clinch River.

This species appears to be most closely related to Fusconaia cor.
