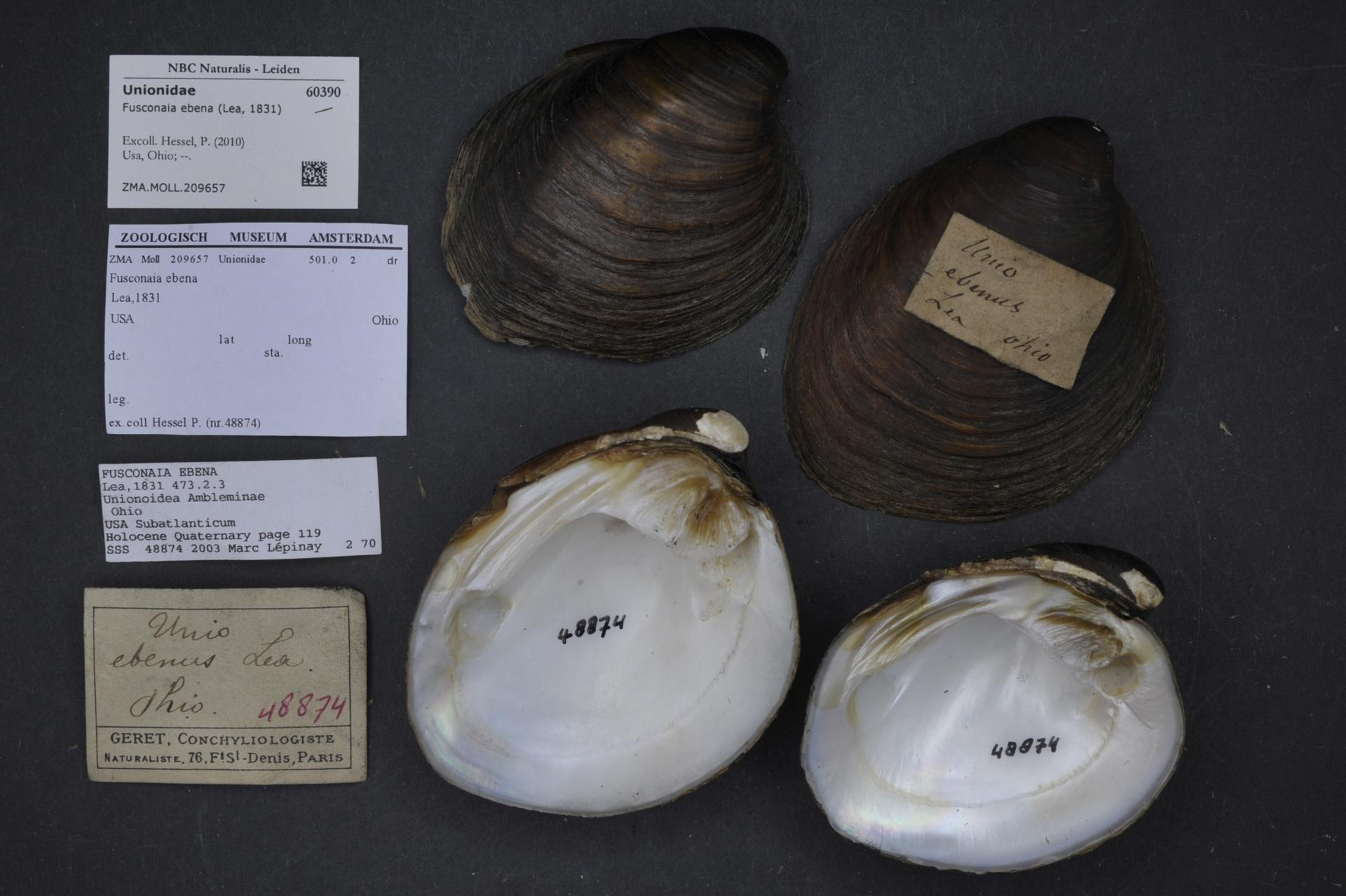

Conservation status
- Least Concern (IUCN 3.1)

- Apparently Secure (NatureServe)

Scientific classification
- Kingdom: Animalia
- Phylum: Mollusca
- Class: Bivalvia
- Order: Unionida
- Family: Unionidae
- Genus: Reginaia
- Species: R. ebenus

Binomial name
- Reginaia ebenus (I. Lea, 1831)

Synonyms
- Fusconaia ebena; Fusconaia ebenus; Unio ebenus; Obovaria pachostea; Amblema antrosa

= Reginaia ebenus =

Species of mussel

Reginaia ebenus is a species of mussel. It goes by the common name ebonyshell.

The species is listed as least concern by the IUCN, but is endangered in Missouri and Minnesota.

== History ==
Originally the native range for this extended from around the Twin Cities in Minnesota and the Upper Mississippi, and went all the way downstream to the Gulf of Mexico. Then in 1913, a dam was built on the Mississippi River at Keokuk, Iowa cutting off the northern home range for breeding ebonyshells.

== Taxonomy ==
The species was once in the genus Fusconaia but is currently in Reginaia.

== Occurrence ==
It has been found in states like Minnesota, Missouri, Wisconsin, Illinois, Indiana, Ohio, West Virginia and Oklahoma.

== Conservation ==
In Minnesota pollution and dams have been a cause for its decline.
