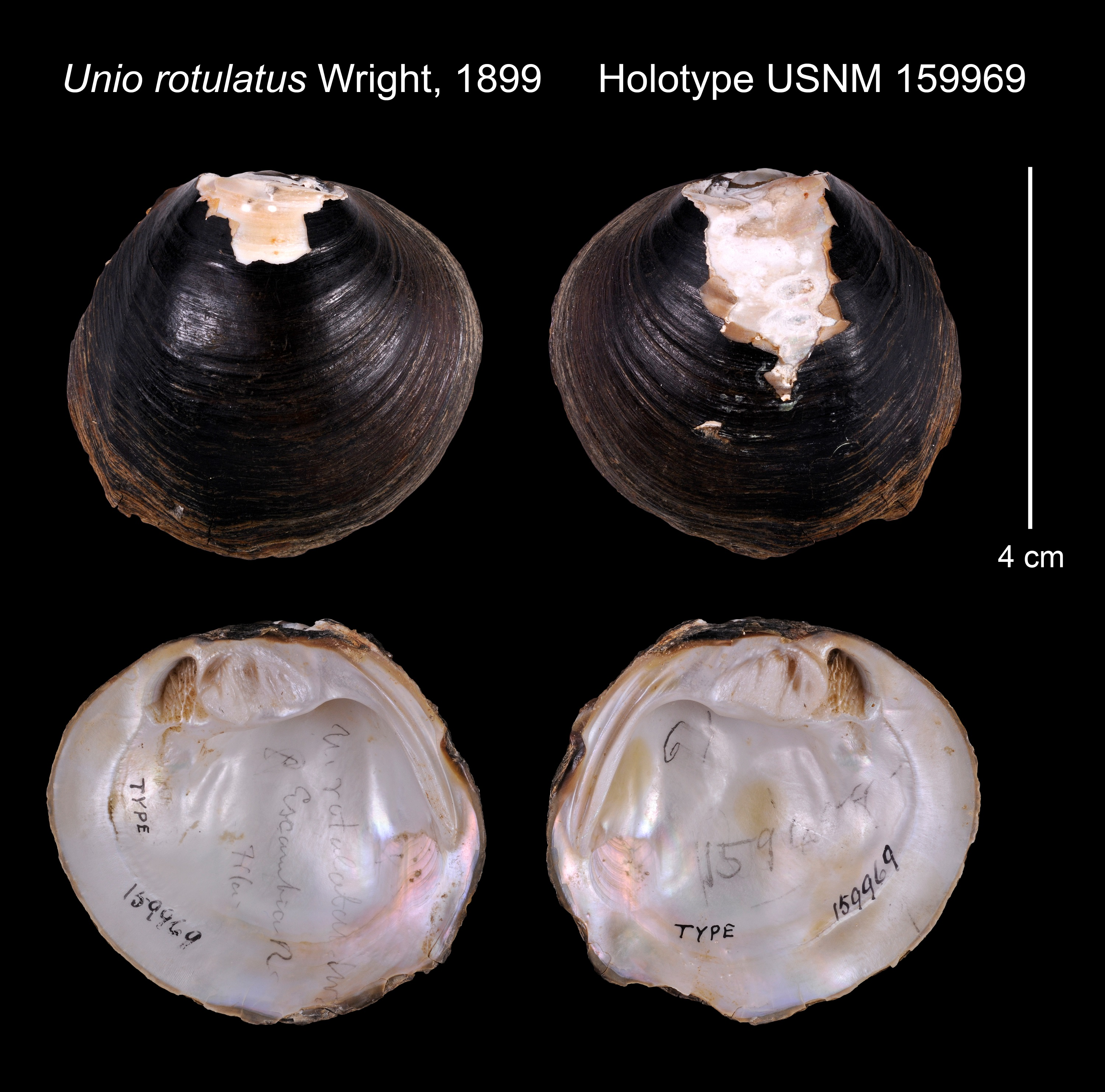

Conservation status
- Endangered (IUCN 2.3)

- Critically Imperiled (NatureServe)
- Endangered (ESA)

Scientific classification
- Kingdom: Animalia
- Phylum: Mollusca
- Class: Bivalvia
- Order: Unionida
- Family: Unionidae
- Genus: Reginaia
- Species: R. rotulata

Binomial name
- Reginaia rotulata (B. H. Wright, 1899)

Synonyms
- Fusconaia rotulata; Obovaria rotulata

= Round ebonyshell =

Species of bivalve

The round ebonyshell (Reginaia rotulata) is a species of freshwater mussel, an aquatic bivalve mollusk.

This species is native to the United States, where it is endemic to a small stretch of the Conecuh and Escambia rivers in Alabama and Florida. It has one of the most restricted ranges of any North American freshwater mussel.

It is threatened by habitat loss and pollution. In 2012 it was added to the endangered species list of the U.S. Fish and Wildlife Service.

The population count is unknown as of now.

This genus was separated from Fusconaia in 2012 based on genetic evidence.
