= Alona smirnovi =

Conservation status
- Vulnerable (IUCN 2.3)

Scientific classification
- Kingdom: Animalia
- Phylum: Arthropoda
- Class: Branchiopoda
- Subclass: Phyllopoda
- Superorder: Diplostraca
- Order: Anomopoda
- Family: Chydoridae
- Genus: Alona
- Species: A. smirnovi

Binomial name
- Alona smirnovi Petkovsky & Flossner,1972

Species of small freshwater animal

Alona smirnovi is a species of crustacean in family Chydoridae. It is endemic to North Macedonia. Its natural habitat is inland karsts.
