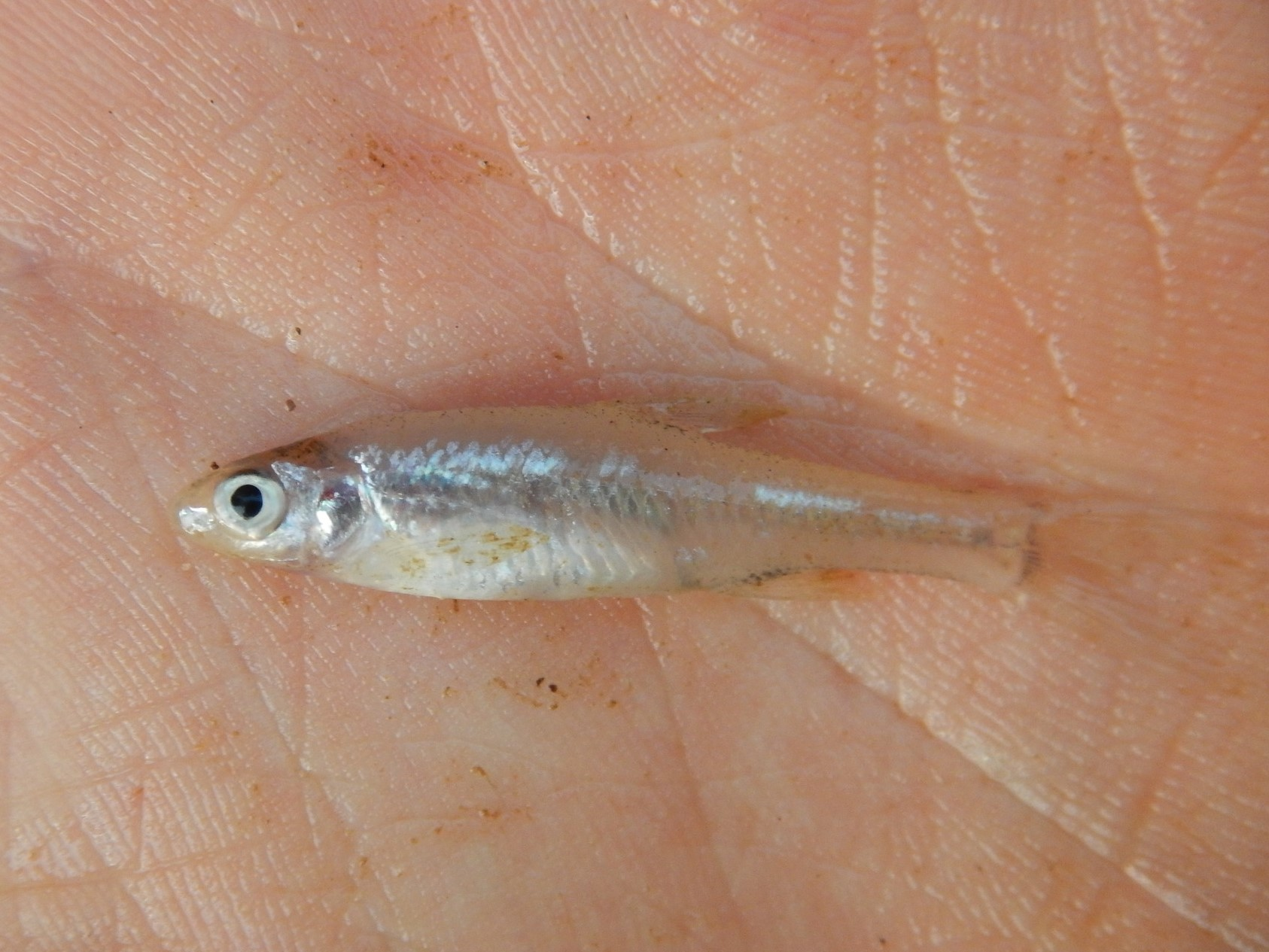

Conservation status
- Least Concern (IUCN 3.1)

Scientific classification
- Kingdom: Animalia
- Phylum: Chordata
- Class: Actinopterygii
- Order: Cypriniformes
- Family: Leuciscidae
- Subfamily: Pogonichthyinae
- Genus: Paranotropis
- Species: P. buchanani

Binomial name
- Paranotropis buchanani (Meek, 1896)

Synonyms
- Notropis buchanani Meek, 1896

= Ghost shiner =

Species of fish

The ghost shiner (Paranotropis buchanani) is a species of freshwater ray-finned fish beloinging to the family Leuciscidae, the shiners, daces and minnows. This species is found in North America. It is generally characterized as being a small bodied, silvery and fusiform shaped cyprinid. The ghost shiner is morphologically similar to and often mistaken for the Mimic Shiner (P. volucellus), which is evident by its former classification as a subspecies of P. volucellus.

== Geographic distribution ==
The current range for 'the ghost shiner extends from the Mississippi River basin in the southern United States to Ontario in southern Canada. Populations have been reported in eastern Kansas, southeastern Nebraska, western Oklahoma and south to northern Alabama, Mississippi, and Louisiana. Populations of ghost shiners are also present in Gulf slope drainages in Texas, Louisiana, and Mexico. In 1993, populations were found in southern Ontario. The trend in the United States is that the farther north the state is from the Gulf Coast, the less secure populations of ghost shiners become. In Ontario, the population is apparently stable.

The first population of ghost shiner in Ontario was discovered in the Thames River watershed in 1979. After the discovery, the Canadian Museum of Nature was checked for similar species of shiners, and a specimen of P. buchanani was found to have previously been collected from Mollys Creek in 1972. The population in southern Ontario has been thought to have been introduced in the 1970s; however, recent studies suggest that it is native to Canada due to natural migration after deglaciation.

== Ecology ==
The diet of the ghost shiner has not been studied yet, but the diet of adults probably consists of insects, phytoplankton, and benthic crustaceans. These fishes are benthopelagic freshwater fish that generally inhabit areas with slow currents in lower magnitude streams of orders one to four. In the higher order streams, ghost shiners are characteristic of low-gradient sections of creeks and rivers with moderate flow and moderately clear to turbid waters. They also inhabit larger pools and protected backwaters without noticeable current in stream orders from one to four. Streams with submerged vegetation create suitable habitat for ghost shiners, as many species have been found in submerged vegetation in the Ohio River valley. Impoundments such as dams have a negative impact on the species' abundance because they limit their range. Dams that are less than 12 feet high do not have to be reported as dams, and these pose a significant risk to populations of Notropis buchanani because they are unregulated.

== Life history ==
Populations of ghost shiners usually breed in the second year of life during the period from May until late August depending on the location of the populations. In Tennessee, P. buchanani were reported to be in a reproductive state in late May, while in Kansas breeding individuals were found in mid-August. The majority of the populations breed during their second summer, and relatively few breed during the third because their lifespan is three years. Ghost shiners spawn in rivers with sluggish sand or gravel riffles. In Tennessee, the spawning occurs in slow moving, silt covered gravel areas in the Stones River below the Walter Hill Dam or in the silty sand substrate of the Mississippi River in northwest part of the state. During the breeding season, males develop nuptial tubercles, particularly on the snout, internasal region, orbit, and underside of the lower jaw. The anterior pectoral rays are slightly thickened, and small blunt tubercles are densely packed along the dorsal surface of rays 2–6. For this species, the fishes hatched in the current year have a mean length of 0.8 to 1.5 in (20 to 38 mm) by October. At one year, they are an average of 1.1 to 2.3 in (28 to 58 mm) long, and as adults individuals grow to an average of 1.3 to 2.3 in (33 to 58 mm). The largest specimen of ghost shiner caught was recorded at a length of 2.6 in (66 mm).

== Management ==
Currently, there are no widely used management practices to monitor the ghost shiner. Populations are stable in southern drainages and all states that populations of the species exist in, and the species has a low vulnerability compared to other species of shiners. The ghost shiner was previously listed as a protected species in Ohio due to habitat loss according to the American Fisheries Society. It is currently not listed as threatened or endangered in any of the states the populations exist in. Information on the historical distributions and success of the ghost shiner is not accessible before 1920 because the species was thought to be a subspecies of the mimic shiner. The abundance of the ghost shiner was considered to be larger before it was discovered in Ohio in 1930. Habitat loss is thought to be a large factor in the decline of populations in the Ohio River Basin. The impounding of waters through damming creates a natural barrier for populations. A 1947 collection of the species was taken from lower Norris Reservoir that suggests the range of the ghost shiner extended farther up the Tennessee River. The population survived for roughly 10 years after the completion of the reservoir, but it is now considered extirpated, as TVA biologists failed to capture any recent specimens after frequent sampling. State and Federal Fish and Wildlife agencies are monitoring the abundance of populations of Notropis buchanani as well as the other native and non-native freshwater fish, but due to the stabilization of species, no specific actions have been designed to help mitigate the risk for the loss of the species. The ghost shiner was previously listed as a protected species in Ohio due to habitat loss according to the American Fisheries Society, but it is currently not listed as threatened or endangered in any of the states that populations of the species occur.
