= Cahaba shiner =

Conservation status
- Endangered (IUCN 3.1)

Scientific classification
- Kingdom: Animalia
- Phylum: Chordata
- Class: Actinopterygii
- Order: Cypriniformes
- Family: Leuciscidae
- Subfamily: Pogonichthyinae
- Genus: Paranotropis
- Species: P. cahabae

Binomial name
- Paranotropis cahabae Mayden & Kuhajda, 1989

Species of fish

The Cahaba shiner (Paranotropis cahabae) is a species of freshwater ray-finned fish beloinging to the family Leuciscidae, the shiners, daces and minnows. It is endemic to Alabama in the United States, where it is limited to the Cahaba River. It is a federally listed endangered species of the United States.

This fish was first described in 1989. It is similar to its close relative, the mimic shiner (P. volucellus). The Cahaba Shiner is about 2.5 inches long (6.35 centimeters). It is silver in color with a dark lateral stripe and a peach-colored lateral stripe above.

This fish has been collected from about 76 miles of the Cahaba River, but as of the early 1990s its range had been reduced to about 60 miles of the river. Most individuals of the species are located in a 15-mile stretch of the waterway. It may have once occurred in the Coosa River, but if so, it has been extirpated from there. The reduction in range has been caused by the degradation of water quality in the river system, the result of urbanization and sedimentation.
