= Acroperus tupinamba =

Scientific classification
- Kingdom: Animalia
- Phylum: Arthropoda
- Class: Branchiopoda
- Order: Anomopoda
- Family: Chydoridae
- Genus: Acroperus
- Species: A. tupinamba

Binomial name
- Acroperus tupinamba Sinev & Elmoor-Loureiro, 2010

Species of small freshwater animal

Acroperus tupinamba is a species of crustaceans.
