= Alona hercegovinae =

Conservation status
- Vulnerable (IUCN 2.3)

Scientific classification
- Kingdom: Animalia
- Phylum: Arthropoda
- Class: Branchiopoda
- Subclass: Phyllopoda
- Superorder: Diplostraca
- Order: Anomopoda
- Family: Chydoridae
- Genus: Alona
- Species: A. hercegovinae

Binomial name
- Alona hercegovinae Brancelj, 1990

Species of small freshwater animal

Alona hercegovinae is a species of crustacean in the family Chydoridae. It is endemic to Bosnia and Herzegovina. Its natural habitat is inland karsts.
