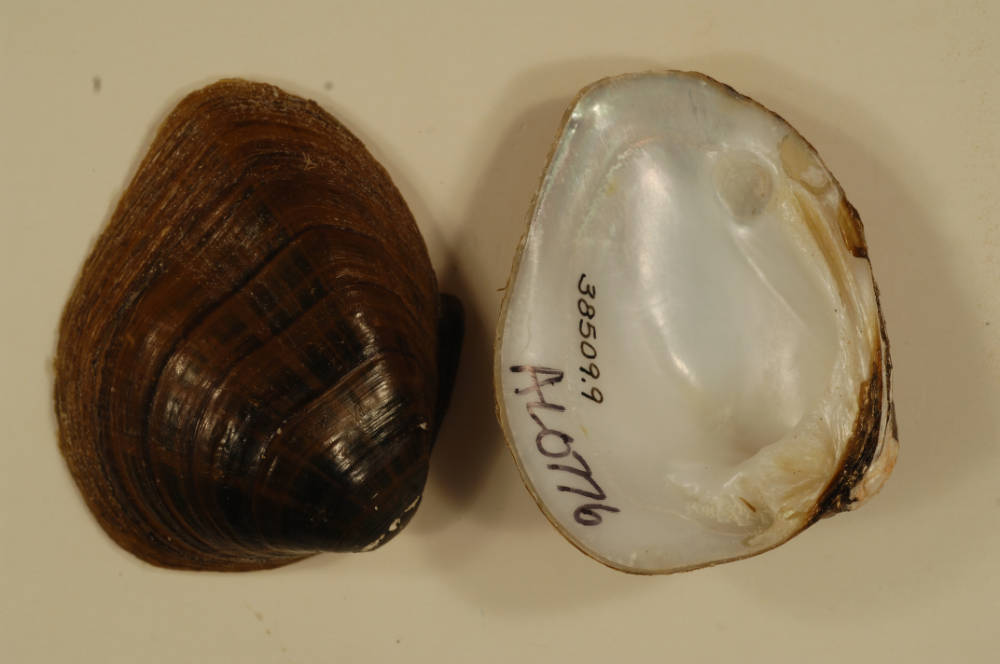
- Museum specimen

Conservation status
- Critically Endangered (IUCN 3.1)

- Endangered (ESA)

Scientific classification
- Kingdom: Animalia
- Phylum: Mollusca
- Class: Bivalvia
- Order: Unionida
- Family: Unionidae
- Genus: Fusconaia
- Species: F. cor

Binomial name
- Fusconaia cor (Conrad, 1834)

Synonyms
- Fusconaia edgariana (Lea, 1840); Unio cor Conrad, 1834; Unio edgarianus Lea, 1840; Unio obuncus Lea, 1871; Unio andersonensis Lea, 1872; Fusconaia cor subsp. analoga Ortmann, 1918

= Shiny pigtoe =

Species of bivalve

The shiny pigtoe (Fusconaia cor) is a species of bivalve in the family Unionidae. It is endemic to the United States.

The shiny pigtoe has been eliminated from most of its historic range. Populations currently exist in the North Fork of the Holston River, Clinch, Powell and Paint Rock river systems in Alabama, Tennessee, and Virginia. Threats to the species include habitat alteration and fragmentation, hydroelectric dams, wastewater discharge, water withdrawal, non-native species, and runoff of silt and other pollutants.

It is a medium-sized mussel that is about 2.5 inches (64 mm) in size. It has a smooth and shiny oval-shaped shell with distinguishing dark green to blackish rays on a yellow to brown background. Younger specimens have a bolder ray color patterning. The inner nacre is white.

The shiny pigtoe is tachytichtic, spawning between late May and early June. Known glochidial hosts include the common (Luxilus cornutus), warpaint (Luxilus coccogenis), telescope (Notropis telescopus) and whitetail (Cyprinella galactura) shiners.

This species appears to be most closely related to Fusconaia cuneolus.
