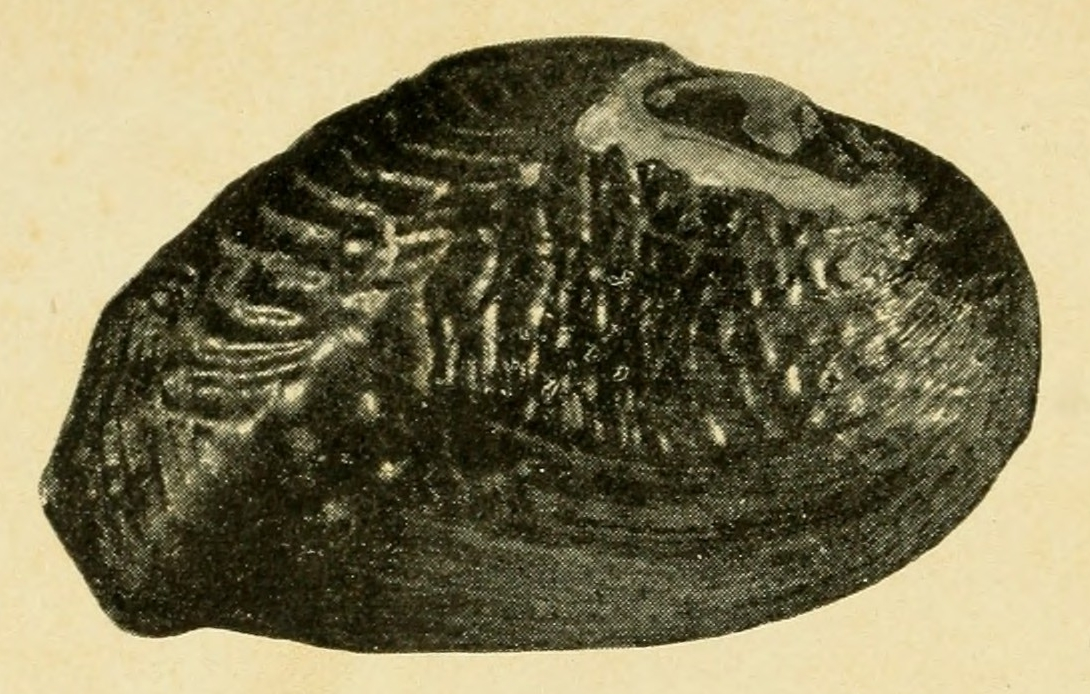
- External shell structure of Fusconaia burkei from the original description of the species.

Conservation status
- Near Threatened (IUCN 3.1)

- Imperiled (NatureServe)

Scientific classification
- Kingdom: Animalia
- Phylum: Mollusca
- Class: Bivalvia
- Order: Unionida
- Family: Unionidae
- Genus: Fusconaia
- Species: F. burkei

Binomial name
- Fusconaia burkei Walker, 1922

Synonyms
- Quadrula (Quincuncina) burkei (B.Walker, 1922); Quincuncina burkei B.Walker, 1922

= Fusconaia burkei =

Species of bivalve

Fusconaia burkei, the tapered pigtoe, is a species of freshwater mussel, an aquatic bivalve mollusk in the family Unionidae, the river mussels.

This species is endemic to North America. It has been a federally listed threatened species under the authority of the Endangered Species Act of 1973 since 2013.

== Original description ==
This species, originally called Quincuncina burkei, was first described by Bryant Walker in 1922.

Walkers's original text (the type description) reads as follows:

Quincuncina burkei Walker. Plate I, figs. 1 and 4.

Shell of moderate size, subrhomboid, very inequilateral, subsolid, somewhat inflated; beaks only slightly elevated above the hinge-line, their sculpture consisting of strong, subcircular ridges, stronger along the umbonal ridge and curved up sharply behind, fading out anteriorly and becoming nearly parallel with the growth-lines; anterior end regularly rounded; base line curved; posterior end somewhat produced, subtruncate, curving down rather abruptly and subangulated as it approaches the posterior point, which is below the median of the disk; posterior ridge strong and angulated by the junction of the surface ridges; posterior slope with strong ridges, curving upwards, extending from the posterior ridge to the posterior margin, these form a sharp angle on the posterior ridge with heavier ridges extending downward and forward, which become more or less broken and tuberculous toward the margin and much weaker on the anterior end where they assume a rather quincuncial arrangement; epidermis in mature shells black or sometimes dark brown, in young shells brown or occasionally greenish-yellow, in which case obscure radial stripes of darker green are visible; pseudocardinals double in both valves; in the right valve the anterior is low and oblique, the posterior strong and erect; in the left valve the anterior is rather long and projects obliquely forward, the posterior is larger, erect and more or less split up; the laterals, two in the left valve and (usually) one in the right are only a little curved, that in the right valve is sometimes more or less inclined to be double; beak cavities not very deep nor compressed; anterior muscle scars well marked, the superior one deep and extending under the base of the anterior pseudocardinal; posterior muscle scars distinct, but not deeply impressed; nacre light purplish, deeper in the beak cavities and iridescent behind.

Length 51.4, height 31.5, diam. 18.5 mm.

The type locality is Sikes' Creek, a tributary of the Choctahatchee River, Barbour County, Ala. It also occurs in the Choctahatchee River, Blue Springs; Pea River at Elamville, Clio and Flemings' Mill and Campbell's Creek near Clio, Barbour County, and Hurricane Creek, near Hartford, Geneva County, Ala.

This species was first discovered in the Pea River at Elamville, Ala., by Joseph B. Burke and is named after him by the request of the late H. H. Smith.

So far as known it is restricted to the Choctahatchee drainage system.

There is some variation in shape and considerable in sculpture shown in the series from the several localities listed above. As shown by the figure the type is quite distinctly biangulated at the posterior extremity, but in many specimens the upper angle disappears and the dorsal outline curves directly down to a sharp posterior point. The surface sculpture is some times nearly obsolete. This is quite marked in the shells from Hurricane Creek and the Pea River at Clio. On the other hand the series from Campbell's Creek are larger and have a much coarser sculpture than any of the other lots. The largest specimen seen is in this lot and measures 67.5 × 38 × 23 mm.

The species is extremely subject to erosion and for this reason the type was selected from the series from Sikes' Creek, which were in much better condition than those from the Choctahatchee, which supplied the alcoholic material on which the generic diagnosis is based.

The description of the beak sculpture is based on a single young shell from the Pea River, which is nearly in perfect condition.

As stated in the generic diagnosis the affinities of this species lie clearly with U. infucatus Con. and U. kleinianus Lea. It differs from both in its more elongated shape and less compressed beak cavities. But the peculiar surface sculpture is the same in all.
