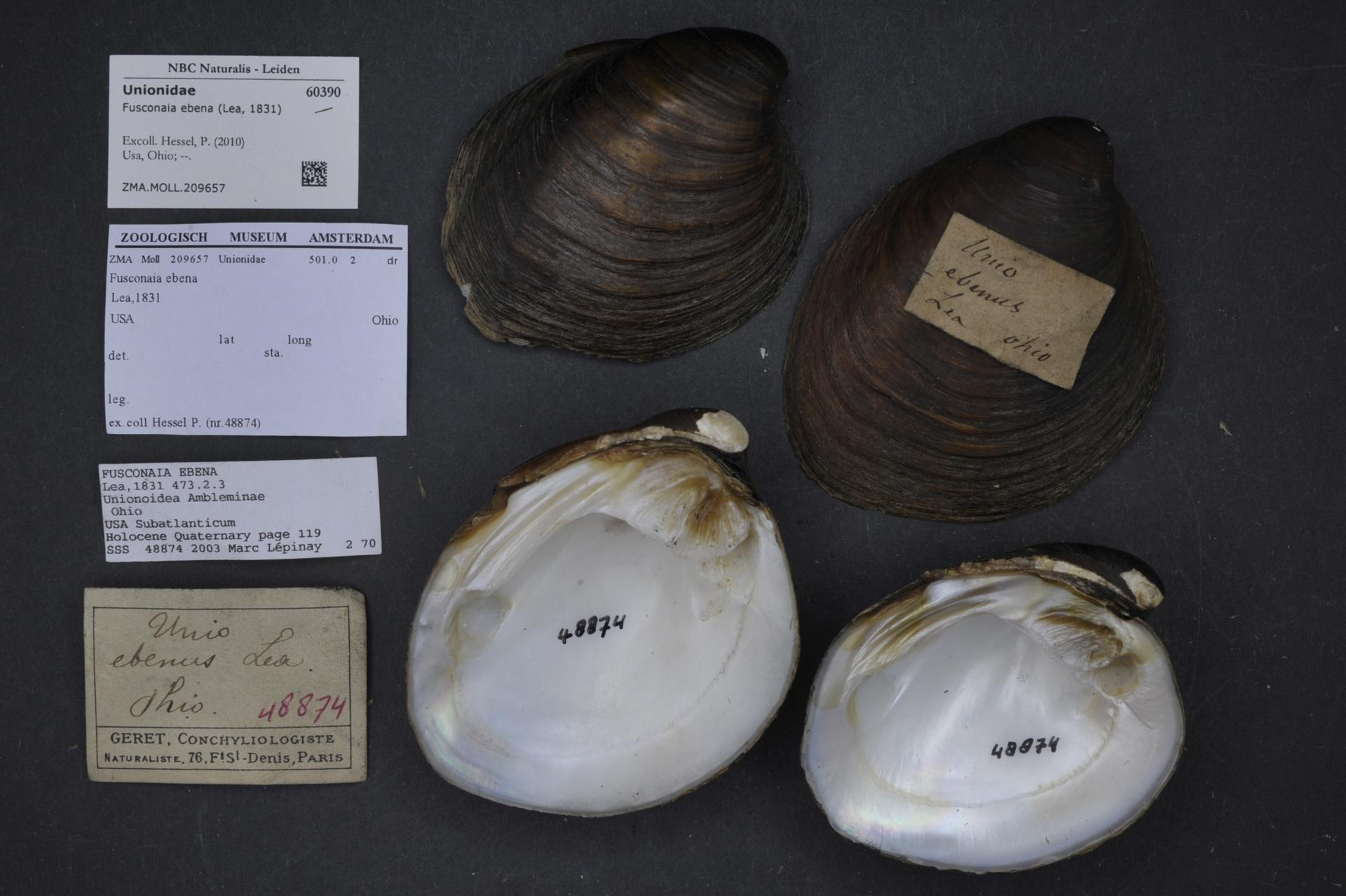
- Reginaia ebenus

Scientific classification
- Domain: Eukaryota
- Kingdom: Animalia
- Phylum: Mollusca
- Class: Bivalvia
- Order: Unionida
- Family: Unionidae
- Tribe: Amblemini
- Genus: Reginaia; Campbell & Lydeard, 2012

= Reginaia =

Genus of bivalves

Reginaia is a genus of freshwater mussels in the family Unionidae native to North America. This genus was separated from Fusconaia in 2012 based on genetic evidence.

== Species ==
Species within this genus are:

- Reginaia apalachicola – Apalachicola ebonyshell
- Reginaia ebenus – Ebonyshell
- Reginaia rotulata – Round ebonyshell
