= Celsinotum candango =

Scientific classification
- Kingdom: Animalia
- Phylum: Arthropoda
- Clade: Pancrustacea
- Class: Branchiopoda
- Order: Anomopoda
- Family: Chydoridae
- Genus: Celsinotum
- Species: C. candango

Binomial name
- Celsinotum candango Sinev & Elmoor-Loureiro, 2010

Species of small freshwater animal

Celsinotum candango is a species of crustacean. Its epithet comes from the name applied to people that built the city of Brasília and was subsequently used for its inhabitants. The species was found in Lagoa do Henrique, a freshwater pond in the Brasília National Park. Its body is high and rounded, with a low dorsal keel. Its last 5–8 ventral setae ventral setae thick and spiniform, carrying 1–3 setules on their posterior margin. Its head shield and head pores are the same as its cogenerate species, as is its labrum, antenna and antennule and thoracic limbs. Celsinotum candango other species of the genus in the proportions of its postabdomen, given the postanal portion is 1.2–1.3 times longer than the anal one in all other species. It differs from Australian species (C. hypsophilum, C. parooensis and C. platamoides) by its less developed keel, the lateral head pores which are located close to midline, a longer spine on the basal segment of the antenna exopodite, and by the presence of very big projections on the latter. The Brazilian C. Laticaudatum differs from C. candango by having a longer spine on the basal segment of the antenna exopodite, in the shape of its postabdomen, and in postabdominal denticles, which in this species are long and single.

== Description ==
This species description is based on a parthenogenetic female. Its body is rounded and high, compressed laterally. Its maximum height is at the middle of the body, its height/length ratio being 0.75–0.8 in adults. Its dorsal margin is arched, the posterior margin being somewhat convex. Its posterodorsal angle is broadly rounded, with approximately 25 long setules. It also counts with a row of about 50 to 70 long and thin setules along the posterior margin on the inner side of its carapace. The carapace ornamentation is observed as lightly developed longitudinal lines. Its head is elongated and narrow, its rostrum is obliquely truncated. The ocellus is small, the eye being two times larger than the former. It possesses three major head pores of similar size with a narrow connection between them. The animal's thorax is three times longer than its abdomen.

The postabdomen narrows distally, the length of which is equal to about 2.5 heights. It counts with setae natatoriae about 2.1–2.3 the length of the preanal portion of its postabdomen. Its antennule is long and narrow, nearly reaching the tip of the rostrum; the antennular seta is thin, of about half the length of the antennule. It exhibits nine terminal aesthetascs, the two longest being about 2/3 the length of the antennule itself. All the aesthetascs project beyond the anterior margin of the head shield. Setae arising from the basal segment of its endopodite are thin and shorter than the endopodite itself. It counts with 5 thoracic limbs.

== Distribution ==
At present, C. candango was only reported from the type locality: Lagoa do Henrique (Brasília National Park), which is a small (diameter about 200m) shallow freshwater pond, with macrophytes almost all over its area, surrounded by typical "Cerrado" vegetation (tropical savanna). The sample was taken at the beginning of the dry season being the depth at sampling site of about 20–40 cm. Waters were oligotrophic low mineralized, acidic (pH: 4,93–5,50) and relatively low oxygenated (OD: 3,63– 6,32 mg/L).
