= Alona sketi =

Conservation status
- Vulnerable (IUCN 2.3)

Scientific classification
- Kingdom: Animalia
- Phylum: Arthropoda
- Class: Branchiopoda
- Order: Anomopoda
- Family: Chydoridae
- Genus: Alona
- Species: A. sketi

Binomial name
- Alona sketi Brancelj, 1992

Species of small freshwater animal

Alona sketi is a species of crustacean in family Chydoridae. It is endemic to Slovenia. Its natural habitat is inland karsts.
