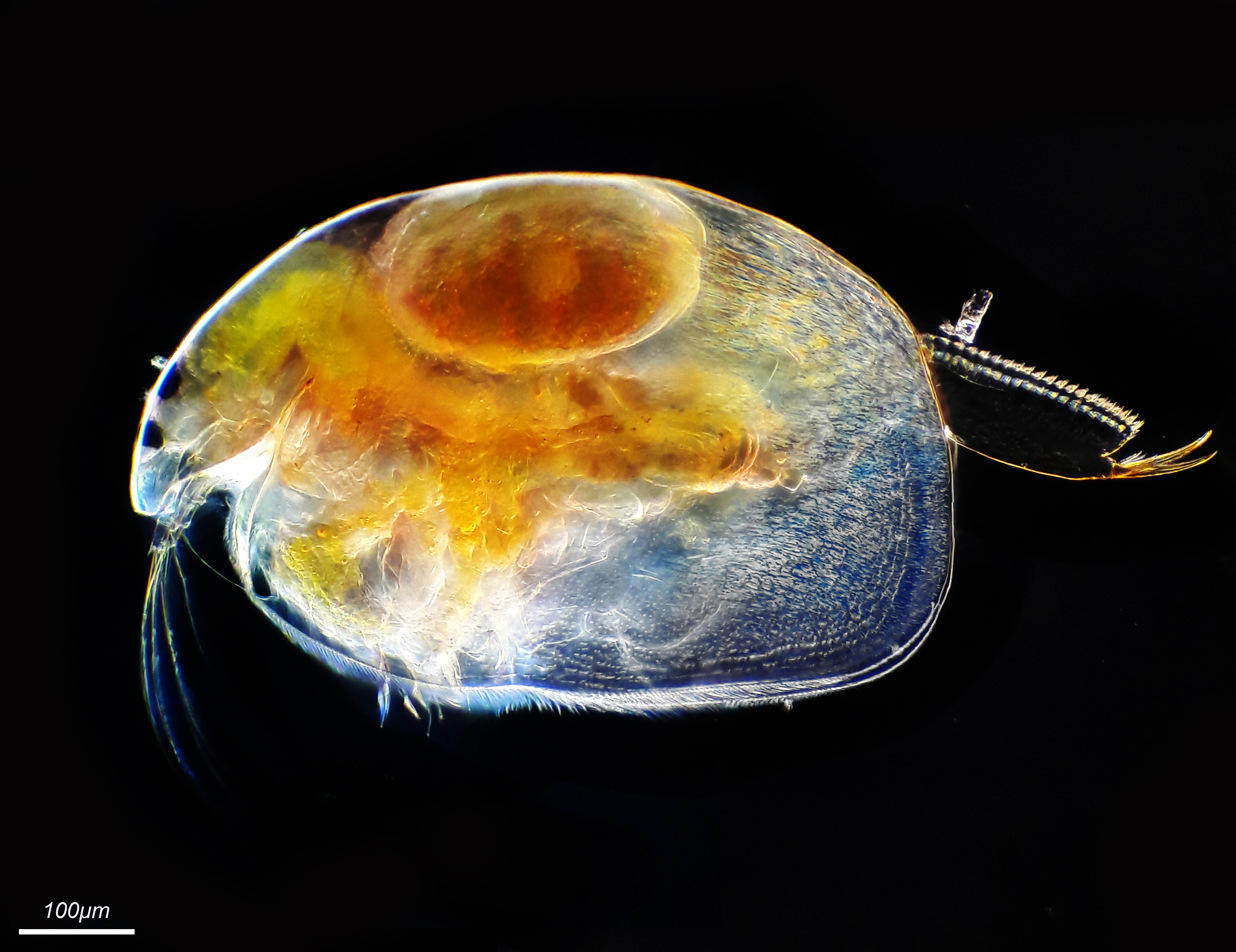
- Microscopic Acroperus Crustacean Biolam R-11

Scientific classification
- Domain: Eukaryota
- Kingdom: Animalia
- Phylum: Arthropoda
- Class: Branchiopoda
- Order: Anomopoda
- Family: Chydoridae
- Genus: Acroperus; Baird, 1843

Species
- See text

= Acroperus =

Genus of small freshwater animals

Acroperus is a genus of crustaceans in the family Chydoridae.

== Species ==
- Acroperus alonoides Hudendorff, 1876
- Acroperus angustatus G.O. Sars, 1863
- Acroperus aureolata (Doolitle, 1913)
- Acroperus avirostris Henry, 1919
- Acroperus dispar Keilhack, 1908
- Acroperus elongatus (G.O. Sars, 1862)
- Acroperus harpae (Baird, 1834)
- Acroperus maduensis Keilhack, 1905
- Acroperus neglectus Lilljeborg, 1901
- Acroperus sinuatus Henry, 1919
- Acroperus tupinamba Sinev & Elmoor-Loureiro, 2010
