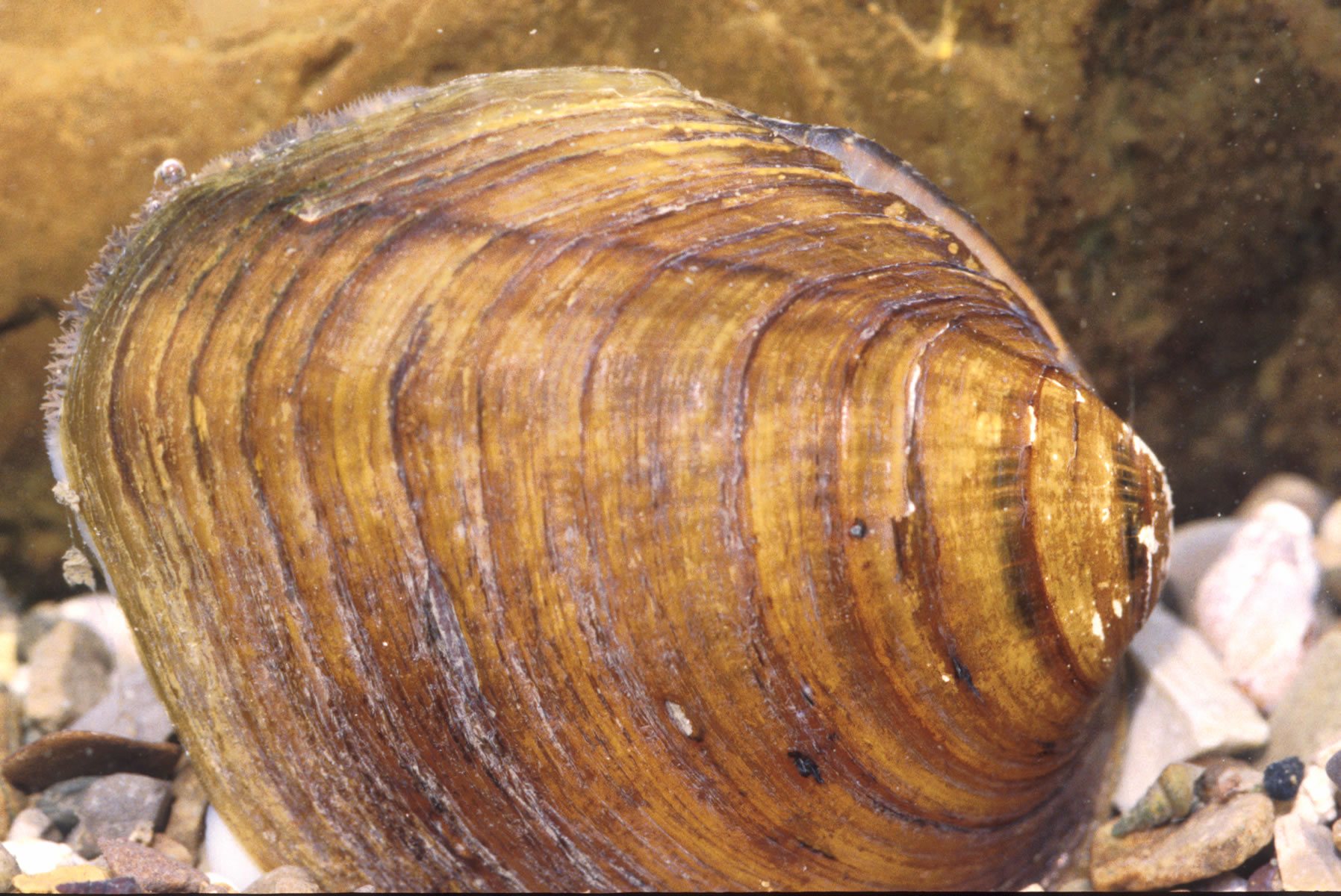

Conservation status
- Vulnerable (IUCN 3.1)

- Threatened (ESA)

Scientific classification
- Kingdom: Animalia
- Phylum: Mollusca
- Class: Bivalvia
- Order: Unionida
- Family: Unionidae
- Genus: Fusconaia
- Species: F. subrotunda

Binomial name
- Fusconaia subrotunda (Lea, 1831)

Synonyms
- List: Fusconaia subrotunda subsp. subrotunda (Lea, 1831); Fusconaia subrotunda subsp. pilaris (Lea, 1840); Fusconaia subrotunda subsp. kirtlandiana (Lea, 1834); Fusconaia subrotunda subsp. lesueuriana (Lea, 1840); Unio subrotundus Lea, 1831; Unio kirtlandianus Lea, 1834; Unio politus Conrad, 1837; Unio pilaris Lea, 1840; Unio lesueurianus Lea, 1840; Unio globatus Lea, 1871; Unio bursapastoris B.H. Wright, 1896; Quadrula flexuosa Simpson, 1900; Quadrula andrewsii Marsh, 1902; Quadrula beauchampii Marsh, 1902; Quadrula kirtlandiana subsp. minor Simpson, 1900; Fusconaja subrotunda subsp. leucogona Ortmann, 1913

= Fusconaia subrotunda =

Species of bivalve

Fusconaia subrotunda, the longsolid, long solid mussel or long solid naiad, is a species of freshwater mussel, an aquatic bivalve mollusk in the family Unionidae.

This mussel, sometimes called a pigtoe, is found in river gravel. Young mussels are light brown, but darken to nearly black with age.

This species is found in Canada and the United States.

== Subspecies ==
- Fusconaia subrotunda kirklandiana
- Fusconaia subrotunda lesueriana Lea
- Fusconaia subrotunda pilaris Lea
- Fusconaia subrotunda subrotunda
