= Rhynchochydorus =

Conservation status
- Vulnerable (IUCN 2.3)

Scientific classification
- Kingdom: Animalia
- Phylum: Arthropoda
- Class: Branchiopoda
- Order: Anomopoda
- Family: Chydoridae
- Subfamily: Aloninae
- Genus: Rhynchochydorus; Smirnov & Timms, 1983
- Species: R. australiensis

Binomial name
- Rhynchochydorus australiensis Smirnov & Timms, 1983

Genus of small freshwater animals

Rhynchochydorus australiensis is a species of crustacean in the family Chydoridae. It is the only species in the genus Rhynchochydorus. It is endemic to Australia.
