= Ozark shiner =

Conservation status
- Near Threatened (IUCN 3.1)

Scientific classification
- Kingdom: Animalia
- Phylum: Chordata
- Class: Actinopterygii
- Division: Teleostei
- Order: Cypriniformes
- Family: Leuciscidae
- Subfamily: Pogonichthyinae
- Genus: Paranotropis
- Species: P. ozarcanus

Binomial name
- Paranotropis ozarcanus (Meek, 1891)

Synonyms
- Notropis ozarcanus Meek, 1891

Species of fish

The Ozark shiner (Paranotropis ozarcanus) is a species of freshwater ray-finned fish beloinging to the family Leuciscidae, the shiners, daces and minnows. This species is endemic to the United States where it is found in the Ozark Uplands in southern Missouri and northern Arkansas, inhabiting the White and Black river systems.
