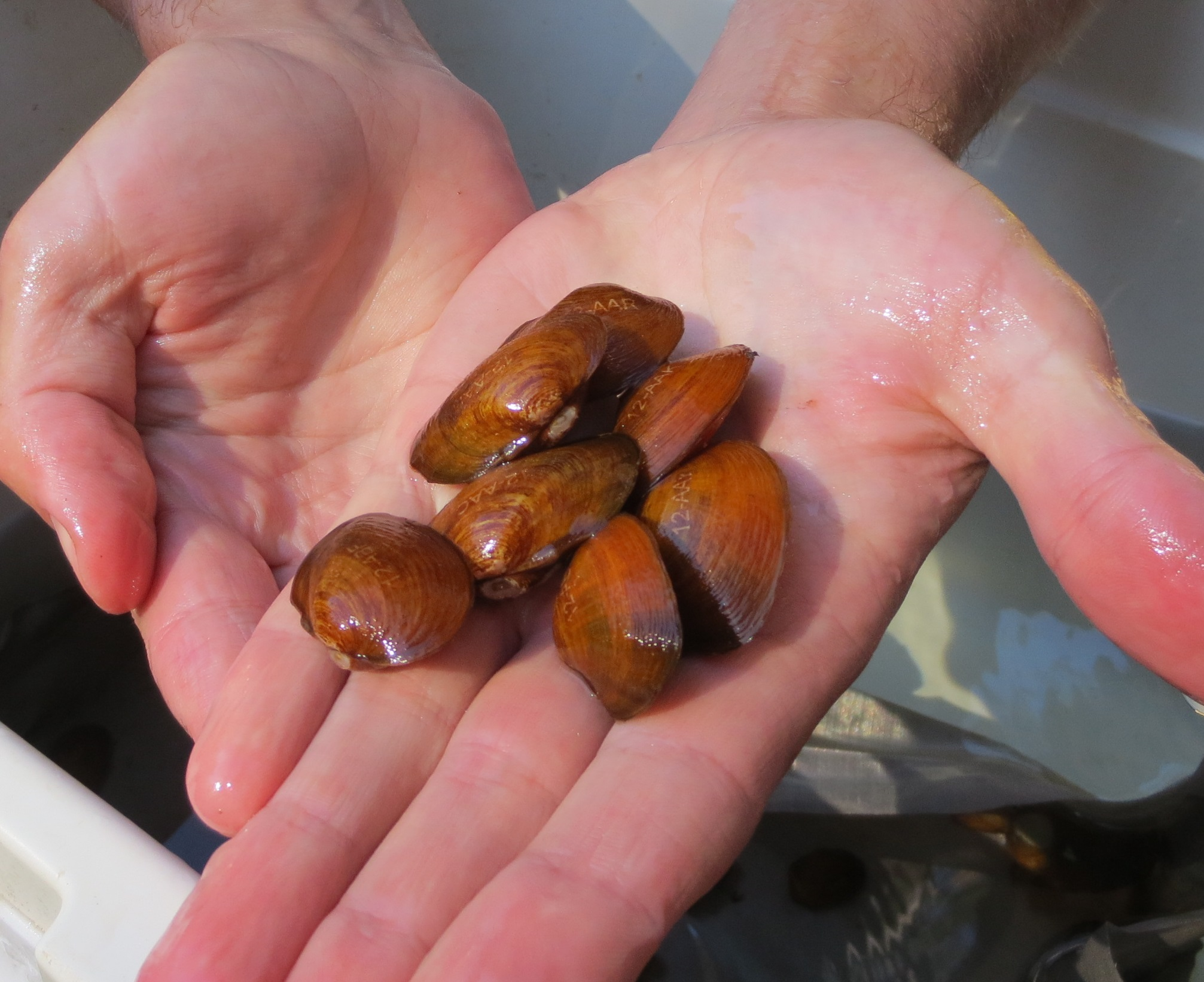

Conservation status
- Endangered (IUCN 2.3)

- Threatened (ESA)

Scientific classification
- Kingdom: Animalia
- Phylum: Mollusca
- Class: Bivalvia
- Order: Unionida
- Family: Unionidae
- Genus: Fusconaia
- Species: F. masoni

Binomial name
- Fusconaia masoni Conrad, 1834

= Atlantic pigtoe =

Species of bivalve

The Atlantic pigtoe (Fusconaia masoni) is a species of bivalve in the family Unionidae. It is endemic to the United States.

It is a small freshwater mussel with a sub-rhomboidal shaped shell and an average size of 2 inches (51 mm). It prefers clean, silt-free, moderate-flowing streams with high oxygen content and gravel or coarse sand substrate. It typically occurs in headwaters in rural areas due to its preference for pristine conditions.

The Atlantic pigtoe relies on fish hosts to complete its larval cycle. The female releases sticky packets of glochidia (larvae) into the stream, which attach to the gills and scales of host minnows. The larvae stay attached to the fish in a parasite relationship until they fully develop and metamorphose into juvenile mussels, after which they drop off into the stream bed.

Its current range is restricted to North Carolina and Virginia, although historically it occurred and Georgia and South Carolina. It is listed as Threatened under the Endangered Species Act since 2021. Threats to the Atlantic pigtoe include habitat degradation due to water quality, water quantity, instream habitat, and habitat connectivity. As of 2019 there were 7 known populations.
