= Fusconaia ozarkensis =

Conservation status
- Least Concern (IUCN 3.1)

- Vulnerable (NatureServe)

Scientific classification
- Kingdom: Animalia
- Phylum: Mollusca
- Class: Bivalvia
- Order: Unionida
- Family: Unionidae
- Genus: Fusconaia
- Species: F. ozarkensis

Binomial name
- Fusconaia ozarkensis Call, 1887

Species of bivalve

Fusconaia ozarkensis is a species of bivalve in the family Unionidae. It is endemic to the United States.
