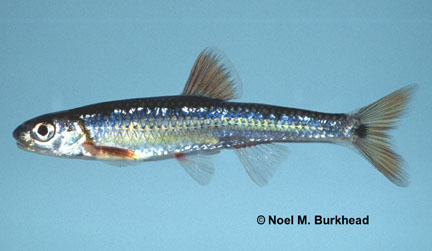

Conservation status
- Least Concern (IUCN 3.1)

Scientific classification
- Kingdom: Animalia
- Phylum: Chordata
- Class: Actinopterygii
- Order: Cypriniformes
- Family: Leuciscidae
- Subfamily: Pogonichthyinae
- Genus: Paranotropis
- Species: P. spectrunculus

Binomial name
- Paranotropis spectrunculus (Cope, 1868)

Synonyms
- Hybopsis spectrunculus Cope, 1868; Notropis spectrunculus (Cope, 1868)

= Mirror shiner =

Species of fish

The mirror shiner (Paranotropis spectrunculus) is a species of freshwater ray-finned fish belonging to the family Leuciscidae, the shiners, daces and minnows. This species is found in the upper Tennessee River drainage in Virginia, North Carolina, Tennessee, South Carolina and Georgia, in the USA.
