= Notoalona =

Scientific classification
- Domain: Eukaryota
- Kingdom: Animalia
- Phylum: Arthropoda
- Class: Branchiopoda
- Order: Anomopoda
- Family: Chydoridae
- Genus: Notoalona; Rajapaksa & Fernando, 1987

Genus of crustaceans

Notoalona is a genus of crustaceans belonging to the family Chydoridae.

The species of this genus are found in America.

Species:

- Notoalona freyi Rajapaksa & Fernando, 1987
- Notoalona globulosa (Daday, 1898)
- Notoalona pseudomacronyx 2013
- Notoalona sculpta (Sars, 1901)
