= Channel shiner =

Conservation status
- Least Concern (IUCN 3.1)

Scientific classification
- Kingdom: Animalia
- Phylum: Chordata
- Class: Actinopterygii
- Order: Cypriniformes
- Family: Leuciscidae
- Subfamily: Pogonichthyinae
- Genus: Paranotropis
- Species: P. wickliffi

Binomial name
- Paranotropis wickliffi (Trautman, 1931)

Synonyms
- Notropis wickliffi Trautman, 1931

Species of fish

The channel shiner (Paranotropis wickliffi) is a species of freshwater ray-finned fish beloinging to the family Leuciscidae, the shiners, daces and minnows. It is endemic to the United States where it is widespread in the Mississippi River basin, including the Missouri, Ohio, Arkansas, and Tennessee rivers and the lower portions of their tributaries.
