= Celsinotum =

Scientific classification
- Kingdom: Animalia
- Phylum: Arthropoda
- Class: Branchiopoda
- Order: Anomopoda
- Family: Chydoridae
- Genus: Celsinotum; Frey, 1991

Species
- Celsinotum candango Sinev & Elmoor-Loureiro, 2010; Celsinotum hypsilophum Frey, 1991; Celsinotum laticaudatum Smirnov & Santos-Silva, 1995; Celsinotum parooensis Frey, 1991; Celsinotum platamodes Frey, 1991

Genus of crustaceans

Celsinotum is a genus of crustaceans in the family Chydoridae.
