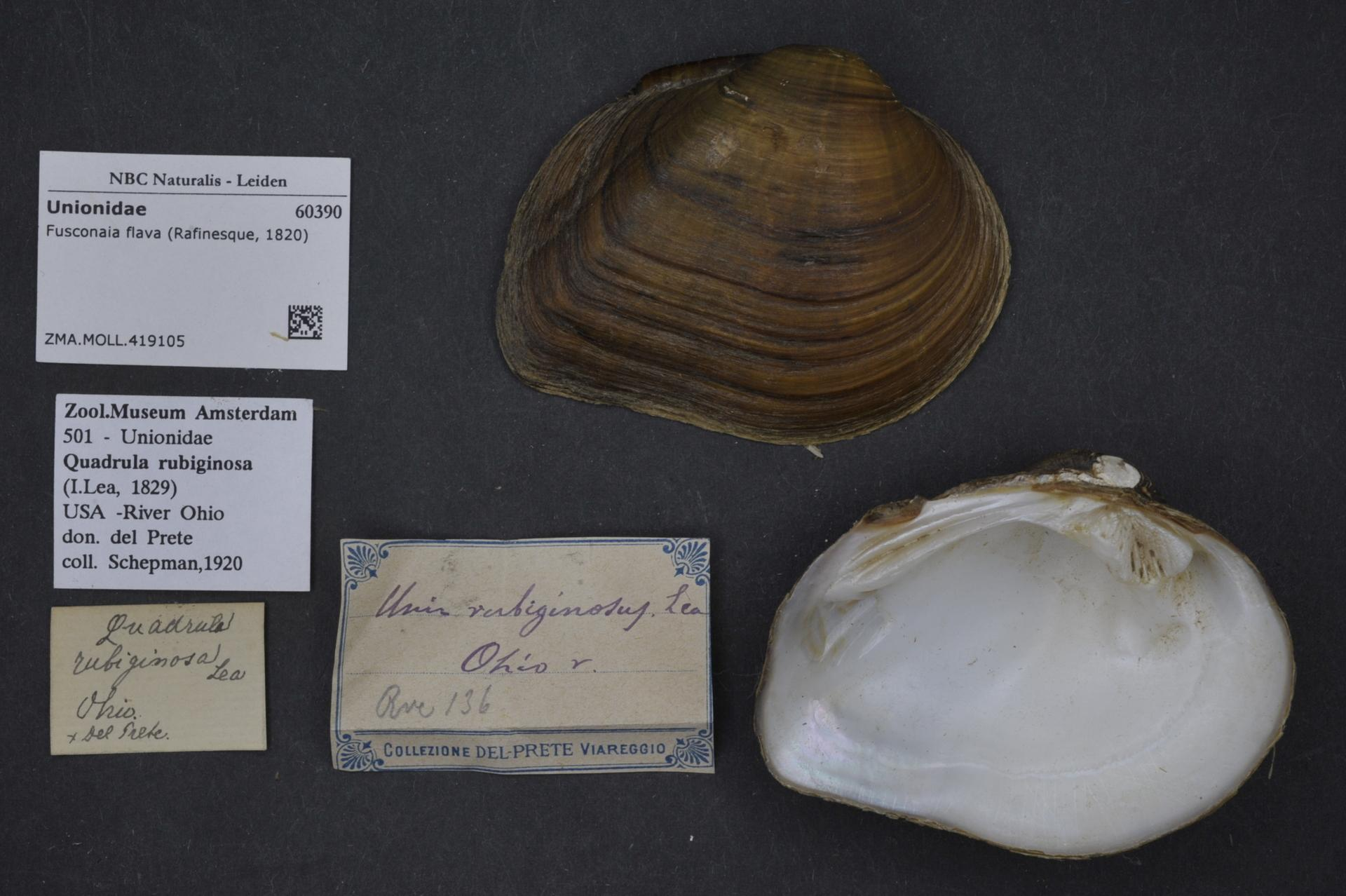

Conservation status
- Least Concern (IUCN 3.1)

- Secure (NatureServe)

Scientific classification
- Kingdom: Animalia
- Phylum: Mollusca
- Class: Bivalvia
- Order: Unionida
- Family: Unionidae
- Genus: Fusconaia
- Species: F. flava

Binomial name
- Fusconaia flava (Rafinesque, 1820)

= Fusconaia flava =

Species of bivalve

Fusconaia flava, the Wabash pigtoe, is a freshwater mussel in the family Unionidae. This species occurs in southern Manitoba and Ontario, Canada as well as in the eastern and midwestern United States from North Dakota to New York, south to Mississippi and Texas.

== Description ==
The shell is divided into two valves that are hinged. Fusconaia flava shell is thick and can be compressed or inflated, has a triangular to an elongate triangle shape. Nacre (the inside layer of the shell) is white, but sometimes the nacre can be pink or salmon color.

== Life cycle ==
Fusconaia flava males release sperm and the females collect the sperm through the incurrent siphon. The eggs are fertilized internally. Fusconaia flava has a parasitic larva stage called glochidia, the mussels use a lure to attract fish and then release the glochidia when the fish is close enough. The glochidia latch onto the gills or fins of the fish and remain there feeding of the blood of the fish until the glochidia reach the juvenile stage. Known host species for Fusconaia flava include silver shiner (Notropis photogenis) and creek chub (Semotilus atromaculatus). Parent mussel provides no care once the glochidia are released. Fusconaia flava are filter feeders, waste is released through the excurrent siphon. They are sedentary creatures and are anchored to the substrate or buried in the substrate.

== Habitat ==
Fusconaia flava can be found in lotic habitat anywhere from small streams to large rivers, and can handle various types of substrate including mud, sand, or gravel. Although Fusconaia flava is of least conservation concern, nineteen percent of Kentucky mussels have become extinct or extirpated from Kentucky due to habitat loss.
