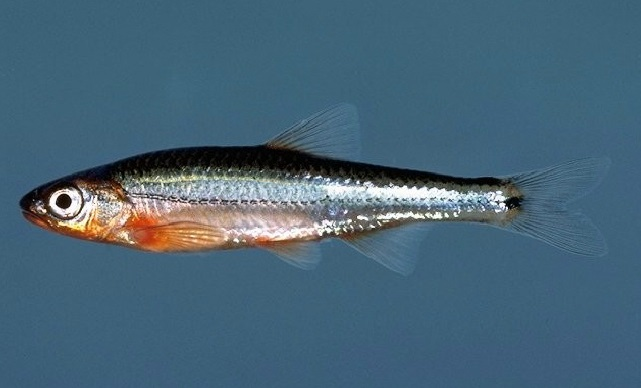

Conservation status
- Least Concern (IUCN 3.1)

Scientific classification
- Kingdom: Animalia
- Phylum: Chordata
- Class: Actinopterygii
- Order: Cypriniformes
- Family: Leuciscidae
- Subfamily: Pogonichthyinae
- Genus: Paranotropis
- Species: P. leuciodus

Binomial name
- Paranotropis leuciodus (Cope, 1868)

Synonyms
- Photogenis leuciodus Cope, 1868; Notropis leuciodus (Cope, 1868)

= Tennessee shiner =

Species of fish

The Tennessee shiner (Paranotropis leuciodus) is a species of freshwater ray-finned fish beloinging to the family Leuciscidae, the shiners, daces and minnows. It is native to the southeastern United States.

== Description ==
This is a slender minnow about 5 to 6.5 centimetres (2.0 to 2.6 in) long. A lateral band and a paler stripe run from the gills to the tail fin. There is a rectangular spot on the caudal peduncle. The scales along the back are dark and the belly is white. The breeding male is red-orange in color.

== Distribution ==
The fish is distributed throughout several river basins in the states of Alabama, Georgia, Kentucky, North Carolina, South Carolina, Tennessee, and Virginia. It occurs in much of the Tennessee River drainage, especially the upper tributaries, and the Cumberland and Green River drainages. It occurs in the Savannah and Kanawha River systems, where it may be an introduced species. Its non-native range is not clear, but there are several sites to which it was likely introduced when it was used for bait and released.

== Biology ==
This freshwater fish lives in pools, creeks, and small to medium rivers. It prefers cool, clear waters over gravelly substrates. In this habitat it is associated with some of its congeners, such as the telescope shiner (N. telescopus) and the bigeye shiner (N. boops).

Breeding has been observed in late spring. Males in breeding colors aggregate in swarms in shallow pools and are briefly visited by females, which spawn and then depart. It may also spawn over the nests of other species, such as the river chub (Nocomis micropogon) and largescale stoneroller (Campostoma oligolepis).

== Conservation ==
This is a widespread species with many populations which are likely stable or declining only slowly. There may be threats to local ecosystems, but the species faces no major threats and is not of high conservation concern.
