= Alonella =

Scientific classification
- Kingdom: Animalia
- Phylum: Arthropoda
- Class: Branchiopoda
- Order: Anomopoda
- Family: Chydoridae
- Genus: Alonella; G.O.Sars, 1862

Genus of small freshwater animals

Alonella is a genus of Chydoridae.

The genus was described in 1862 by Michael Sars.

It has cosmopolitan distribution. The results of genetics analysis revealed at least twelve divergent phylogenetic lineages, possible cryptic species, of Alonella, with different distribution patterns. As expected, the potential species diversity of this genus is significantly higher than traditionally accepted.

Species:

- Alonella brachycopa Brehm, 1931
- Alonella breviceps Stingelin, 1905
- Alonella clathratula G.O. Sars, 1896
- Alonella dadayi Birge, 1910
- Alonella excisa (Fischer, 1854)
- Alonella exigua (Lilljeborg, 1853)
- Alonella nana (Baird, 1843)
- Alonella propinqua Smith, 1909
- Alonella pulchella Herrick, 1884
- Alonella qranulata Brehm, 1933
