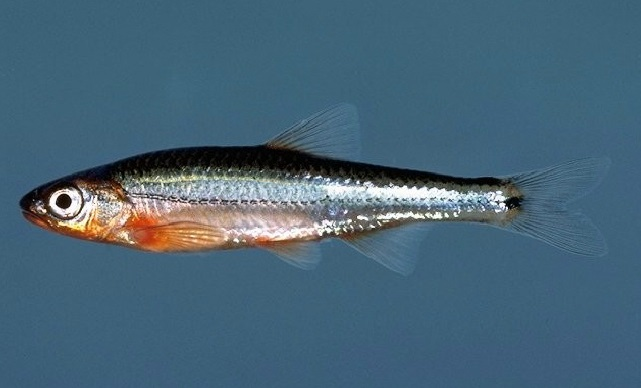
- Tennessee shiner (Paranotropis leuciodus)

Scientific classification
- Kingdom: Animalia
- Phylum: Chordata
- Class: Actinopterygii
- Order: Cypriniformes
- Family: Leuciscidae
- Subfamily: Pogonichthyinae
- Genus: Paranotropis; Fowler, 1904

Type species
- Photogenis leuciodus Cope, 1868

= Paranotropis =

Genus of fishes

Paranotropis is a genus of freshwater ray-finned fishes belonging to the family Leuciscidae, the shiners, daces and minnows. The fishes in this genus are found in North America.

== Species ==
Paranotropis contains the following valid species:

- Paranotropis buchanani (Meek, 1896) (Ghost shiner)
- Paranotropis cahabae (Mayden & Kuhajda, 1989) (Cahaba shiner)
- Paranotropis leuciodus (Cope, 1868) (Tennessee shiner)
- Paranotropis ozarcanus (Meek, 1891) (Ozark shiner)
- Paranotropis shumardi (Girard, 1856) (Silverband shiner)
- Paranotropis spectrunculus (Cope, 1868) (Mirror shiner)
- Paranotropis volucellus (Cope, 1865) (Mimic shiner)
- Paranotropis wickliffi (Trautman, 1931) (Channel shiner)
