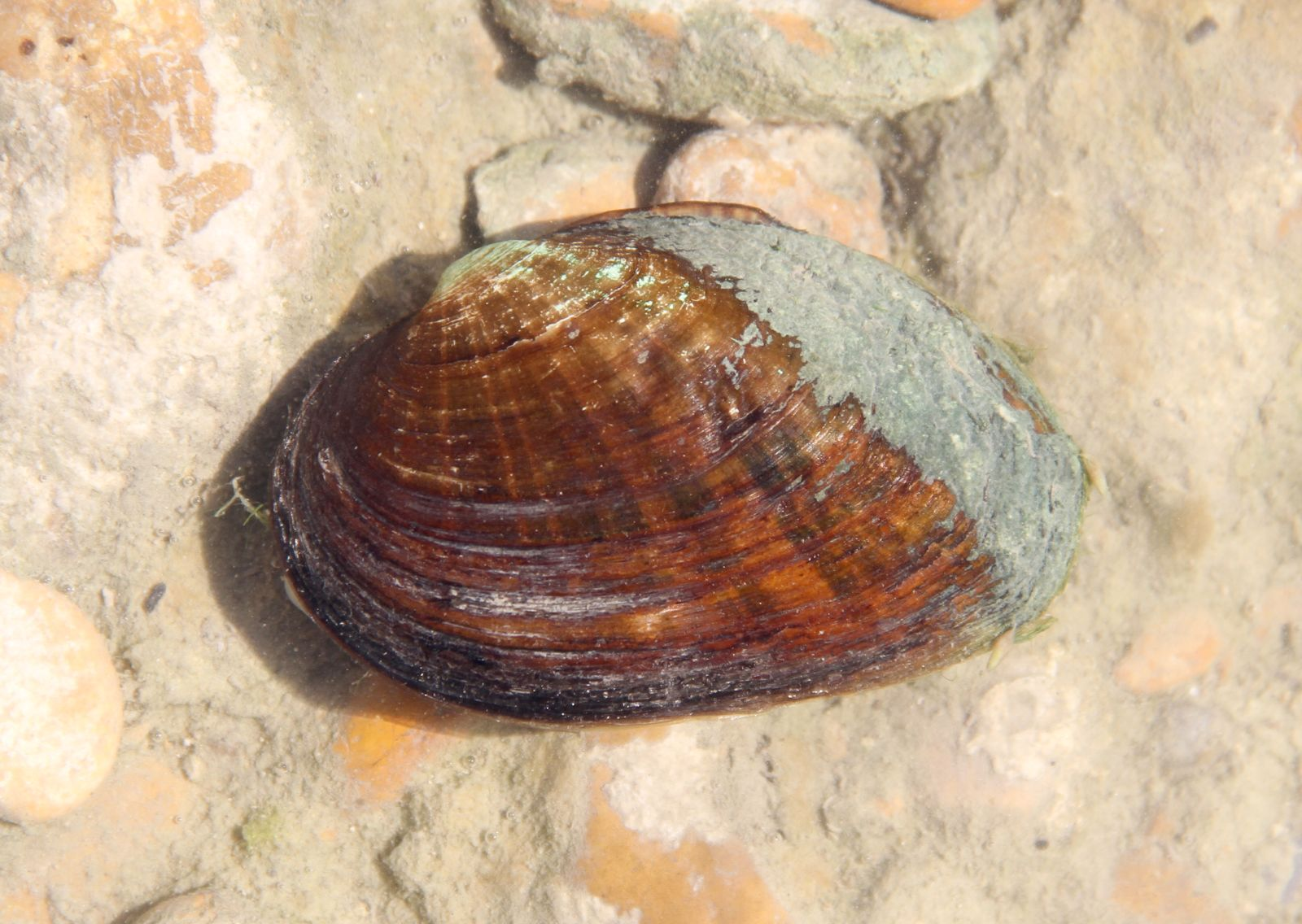

Conservation status
- Critically Endangered (IUCN 3.1)

- Endangered (ESA)

Scientific classification
- Kingdom: Animalia
- Phylum: Mollusca
- Class: Bivalvia
- Order: Unionida
- Family: Unionidae
- Genus: Fusconaia
- Species: F. mitchelli

Binomial name
- Fusconaia mitchelli Simpson, 1895

Synonyms
- Quadrula mitchelli

= Fusconaia mitchelli =

Species of bivalve

Fusconaia mitchelli, the false spike, is a species of freshwater mussel, an aquatic bivalve mollusc in the family Unionidae, the river mussels.

This species is native to Mexico, where its historical range is in the states of Coahuila, Nuevo Leon, and Tamaulipas, and the United States, where it was found in the states of New Mexico and Texas.

== Conservation ==
This species has experienced an extreme population decline due to habitat deterioration. Until recently, no live individuals had been observed since the late 1970s, leading many researchers to believe it was close to (if not already) extinct. However, interest in this species was revived in 2011 when a fresh-dead shell was discovered. A 2011 a survey of the Guadalupe River near Gonzales, Texas revealed a small surviving population, with seven live mature individuals counted.

== Taxonomy ==
In 2016, this species underwent its first genetic study due to its recent rediscovery. The results showed that this species was better placed in Fusconaia rather than Quadrula, which it was previous included in. Historically, it also was formerly included in the now-obsolete genus Quincuncina.

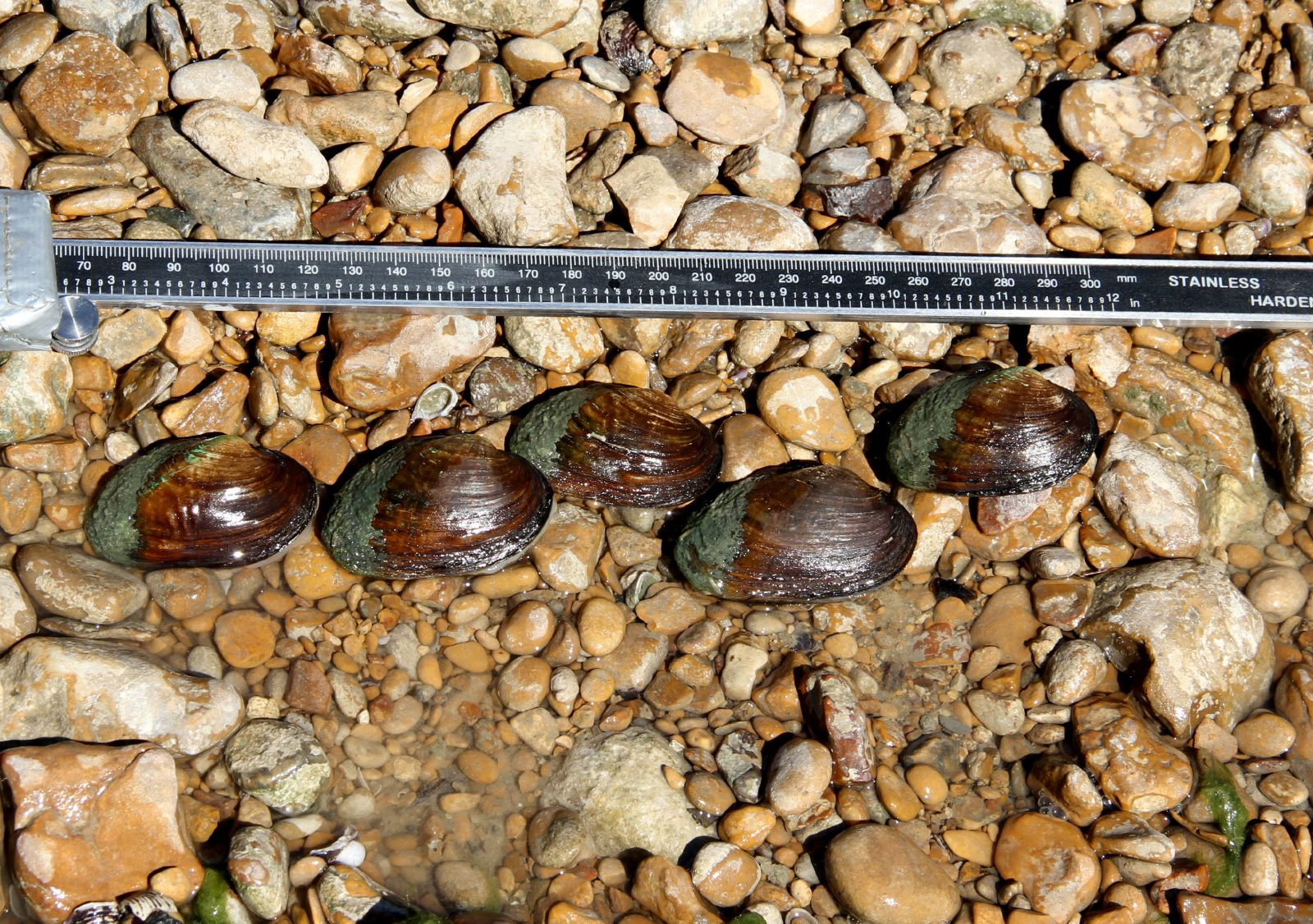
Live Fusconaia mitchelli from the Guadalupe River, Gonzales County, Texas, in 2011.
