= SS Escambia =

History
- Name: SS Escambia
- Owner: Escambia Steamship Co. Ltd. - Crow, Bogart & Rudolf, Liverpool
- Builder: Mounsey & Foster, South Dock, Sunderland
- Yard number: 91
- Launched: 21 April 1879
- Completed: 15 October 1879
- Fate: Capsized and sank on 19 June 1882

General characteristics
- Tonnage: 2,154 gross register tons (GRT); 1,401 tons deadweight (DWT)
- Length: 291 ft (89 m)
- Beam: 34.7 ft (10.6 m)
- Depth: 24.5 ft (7.5 m)
- Installed power: 210 nhp

SS Escambia was an iron screw steamer built at Sunderland in 1879, by the Sunderland Ship Building Company. She was classed 100A1, and was 2,154 tons gross. On 19 June 1882 she capsized with the loss of twenty lives having encountered heavy seas when crossing the bar of San Francisco, California.

The Escambia was voyaging from San Francisco to Cape Verde deeply laden with a cargo of wheat when she capsized some five miles offshore at about 7 pm. The pilot reported that the water in the ballast tanks had been pumped out in order to make the ship carry more cargo, and that the coal on deck was stowed as high as the bridge. She also had a list to port. In the rough seas she rolled enough to submerge her scuppers and shipped enough water to stop her engines. Unable to make way, the ship turned beam on to the breakers and was engulfed.

The United States naval court decided that the vessel was lost through the ordinary perils of the sea but the United Kingdom Board of Trade was not satisfied with this verdict and ordered its own inquiry. Of the crew of twenty four only four were saved.

The Wreck Commissioner reported that the inquiry determined that the Captain was to blame for taking the vessel to sea under that condition having acted simply through lack of judgement. Because the Captain had made every effort to save life after the vessel capsized, the court did not cancel his certificate and he was permitted to return to work.

The wreck was the subject of a story called "Without Ballast" in a book entitled Stories Worth Re-reading, first published in 1919.
