= Elamville, Alabama =

Unincorporated community in Alabama, United States

- Unincorporated community
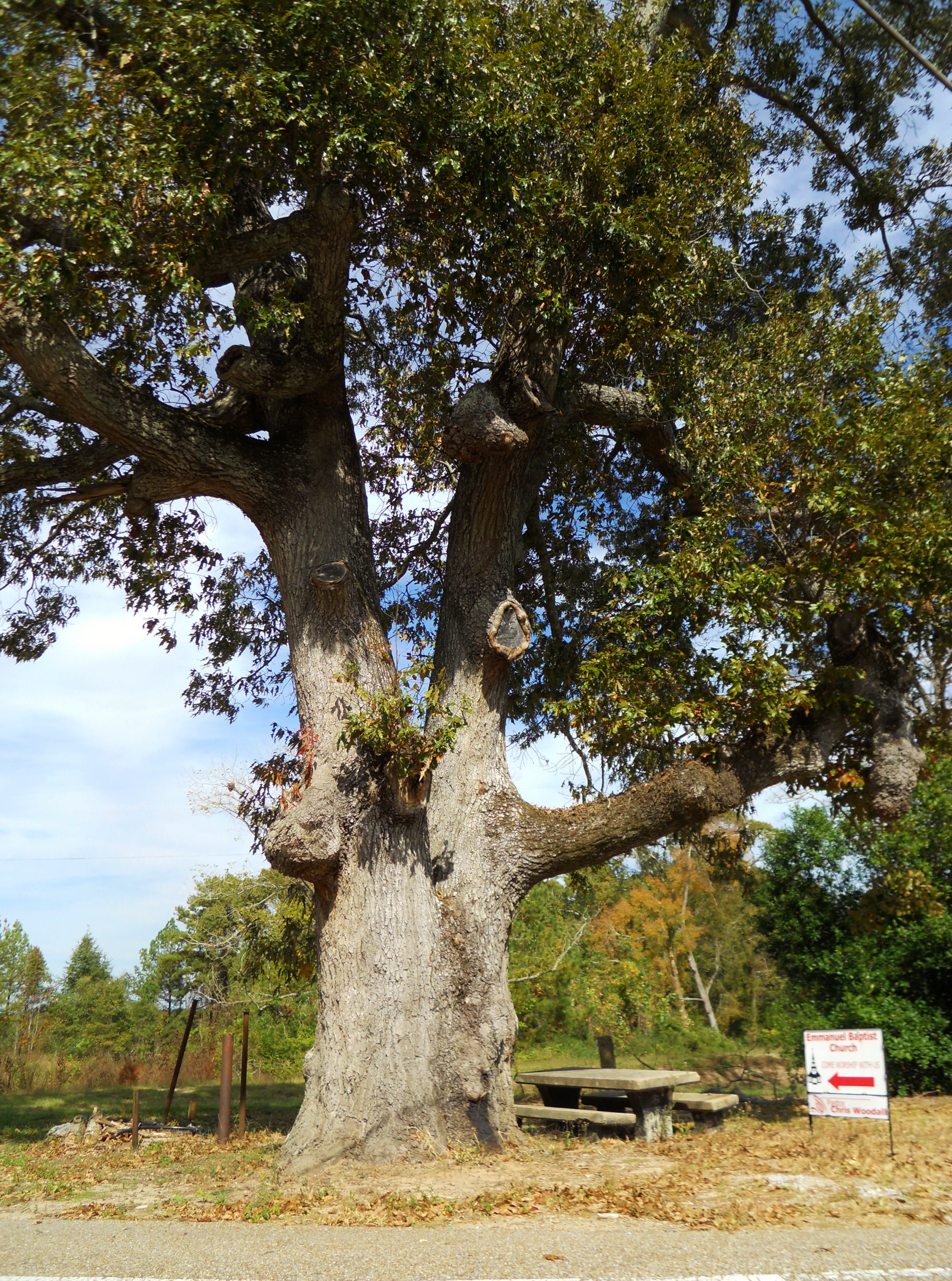
- The "Old Oak Tree"

- Location within Alabama Location within the United States
- Coordinates: 31°40′04″N 85°39′23″W
- Country: United States
- State: Alabama
- County: Barbour
- Elevation: 522 ft (159 m)
- Time zone: UTC-6 (Central (CST))
  - Summer (DST): UTC-5 (CDT)
- Area code: 334
- GNIS feature ID: 117907

Elamville is an unincorporated community in the southwest corner of Barbour County, Alabama, United States. In the early to mid-20th century Elamville was known for the "Old Oak Tree" in the middle of town where the elderly men of the community played dominoes on the state- provided concrete picnic table.

== History ==
Elamville was named after a local church, Elam Church, which itself was named for the ancient kingdom of Elam.
