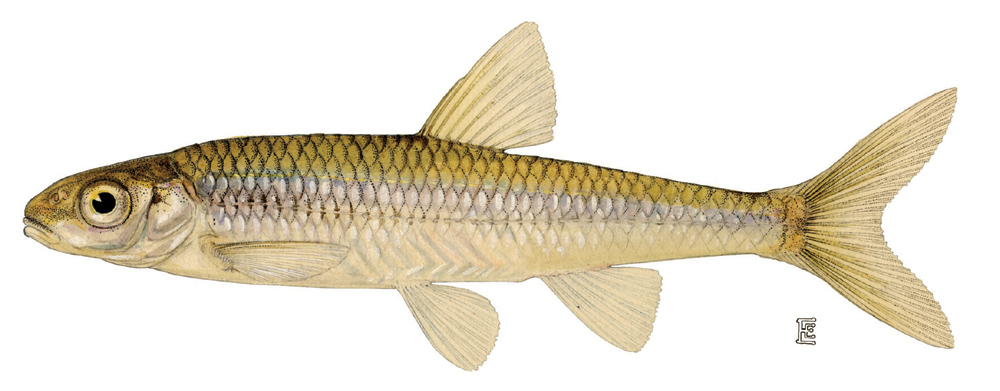

Conservation status
- Least Concern (IUCN 3.1)

Scientific classification
- Kingdom: Animalia
- Phylum: Chordata
- Class: Actinopterygii
- Order: Cypriniformes
- Family: Leuciscidae
- Subfamily: Pogonichthyinae
- Genus: Paranotropis
- Species: P. volucellus

Binomial name
- Paranotropis volucellus (Cope, 1865)

Synonyms
- Hybognathus volucellus Cope, 1865; Notropis volucellus C(ope, 1865); Notropis nocomis Jordan & Gilbert, 1886

= Mimic shiner =

Species of fish

The mimic shiner (Paranotropis volucellus) is a species of freshwater ray-finned fish beloinging to the family Leuciscidae, the shiners, daces and minnows. This species is native to areas of the Hudson Bay drainage, Great Lakes drainage, much of the Mississippi River basin including areas of Tennessee, Virginia, North Carolina, and regions of the Gulf of Mexico extending from Mobile Bay to the drainage of Texas. However, this particular species can be found in other places such as the Atlantic Coast drainage in Connecticut and Housatonic rivers. This genus is usually characterized by almost all having a complete lateral line, 8 dorsal fin rays, a premaxillae protactile, and a silvery or speckled peritoneum. As the common name indicates, this species is difficult to classify in the wild because it looks similar to many other shiners. In fact, some even hypothesize that this species is actually a complexity of many cryptic species. While this is the case, it is important to take more caution to not misidentify this species and to understand its impact on introduced areas.

The diet of P. volucellus consists of some terrestrial insects, small crustaceans, and midge pupae and larvae. Mimic shiners are reported to only live a total of three years, and are suspected to reach sexual maturity after one year. In lakes, fish spawn in large schools located over beds of aquatic plants. When found in small streams mimic shiners are generally in clear pools over gravel substrate in moderate current but they can be seen along shorelines over gravel, sand, and mud substrates usually in slow to moderate current when found in large lakes. The diet of the mimic shiner consists mostly of Daphnia in early spring and late fall while mostly small crustaceans, filamentous algae, and small invertebrates when Daphnia is not as abundant in the summer.

This fish is suspected to have been introduced to many areas via bait bucket release. Because negative impacts of the introduction of this species have not been documented and because this species is not listed as threatened, there is not much immediate need for conservation efforts of this species.

== Distribution ==
Historically, this species has been mostly found in the southern Hudson Bay drainage, Great Lakes drainage, and much of Mississippi River basin except in the northern Great Plains region and is oddly missing from many of its tributaries. The mimic shiner is also in Atlantic Coast drainage in Connecticut, Virginia, North Carolina, and Housatonic rivers along with the region of the Gulf of Mexico extending from Mobile Bay to the drainage of Texas.

However, currently this species can also be found in Susquehanna River, drainage in New York, Potomac River, East Branch of the Delaware River collected in 2002, Connecticut River drainage of Massachusetts, low altitude, Connecticut regions such as Westhill Pond, upper Nashua drainage of Massachusetts, Housatonic River drainage in Massachusetts.

It is suspected that the disappearance of mimic shiners in some areas may be due to a change in hydraulic regimes due to fragmentation of landscapes along with urbanization and development. Due to fragmentation of the landscape near or around riverine ecosystems, there is less available vegetation along these areas. With less vegetation, a faster flow of water pours into streams and rivers and possibly causes erosion to its banks. This influx of water and higher velocity of flow could have negative impacts on this species that lives in areas that has a relatively slow to moderate current.

== Ecology ==
The mimic shiner can generally be found in sandy pools of headwaters, creeks, clear small to large rivers, and in quiet areas of lakes while avoiding small, headwater streams, and swampy and marshy areas. In small streams P. volucellus are in clear pools over gravel substrate in moderate current but they can be seen along shorelines over gravel, sand, and mud substrates usually in slow to moderate current when found in large lakes. When monitoring one most often will find mimic shiners near riffles in current and often will find them schooling in mid-water or at the surface of water.

Because this is a small fish, mimic shiners have many piscivorous predators that are bigger in size. Such predators include northern pike, walleye, largemouth bass, black crappie, yellow perch, rock bass, and brown bullhead among others.

The diet of the mimic shiner consists mostly of Daphnia in early spring and late fall while mostly small crustaceans, filamentous algae, and small invertebrates when Daphnia is not as abundant in the summer. One study showed that Daphnia was present in 85% of all stomachs sampled and zooplankton (copepods and Chydorus) was found in greater than 30% of stomach samples in August. Fish aged at 0 ate mostly Chydorus, but in the summer were found to eat varying amounts of invertebrates like small leeches and some chironomids. At age 2, mimic shiners were found to eat other invertebrates than those stated after May while their diet consisted of 50–80% filamentous algae in September and early October but less than 50% at other times. In this study no other large fish populations, except for some centrarchids, were found that would compete for Daphnia as a food source.

Due to pollution from humans, many fish have been observed to bioaccumulate mercury. While effects of bioaccumulation are mostly studied in the larger piscivores, they can also be observed in smaller prey such as mimic shiners. A rise in mercury levels in water could cause the disappearance of mimic shiners in some areas.

== Life history ==
Mimic shiners are reported to only live a total of three years. This species, at least documented in Tennessee, reach sexual maturity after their first year of growth. Spawning of this species varies depending on different locations due to differences in seasons and temperature changes. In Minnesota and Wisconsin this occurs from May to August while in Alabama this event occurs from mid-April to early August. However, because males produce nuptial tubercles from late May to early October in Tennessee, it is suggested that Notropis volucellus have a longer breeding season than other areas which peak in the summer. In lakes, fish spawn in large schools located over beds of aquatic plants. In streams, however, spawning location has not yet been documented. Clutch sizes increases per female with an increase in body size, ranging from 74 to 386 oocytes produced from body sizes ranging from 36.4 to 45.1 mm (1.43 to 1.78 in). These fertilized eggs are demersal and adhesive.

Because spawning varies depending on varying seasons and temperature changes, it is not unimaginable to predict changes in spawning due to global temperature changes in the future. As of yet, there has not been much research regarding mimic shiners. As stated before, human-caused development and deforestation around the areas alter current of streams and also alter turbidity. Also stated above, the mimic shiner breeds in areas that are clear, has little current, and contains vegetation. Changes in the hydraulic regime of the habitats mimic shiners live in could create unfavorable conditions to reproduce.

== Current management ==
Some places do claim that this species has declined significantly in certain areas. The department of Natural Resources of Ohio state that the mimic shiner was once found all over Ohio, but it is now not as abundant in many places as it used to be. In table 2 of a paper discussing effects of landscape change on fish abundances, the mimic shiner is also listed as intolerant to disturbances and thus has been decreasing in number.

However, many other regions believe this fish to be invasive. The mimic shiner is suspected to have been introduced into many regions. The source is believed to be the spread via the sport of fishing. It is reported, though not commonly sold in stores as such, mimic shiners were used in vast quantities as bait in Wisconsin lake and were even used as a primary source for food for fishes at one hatchery.

Not much is being done to protect this specific species nor are many groups focusing on the mimic shiner. This is not unusual seeing how it is not listed as needing protection according to the IUCN red list of threatened species the population of mimic shiner is stable and its conservation status is of least concern.

While pollution and dams are a major problem or water ecosystems, this fish has not been reported to need assistance in respects to conservation. Instead of needing protection, they need to be prevented from being introduced into non-native areas. It is likely that they could cause disruption to their non-native introduced ranges due to competition for resources.
