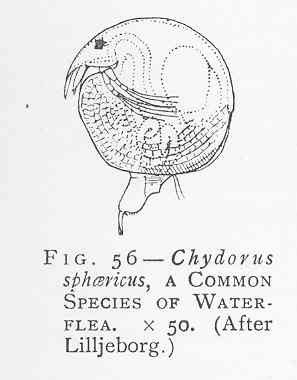
- Chydorus shpaericus, a common species of water-flea.

Scientific classification
- Kingdom: Animalia
- Phylum: Arthropoda
- Class: Branchiopoda
- Order: Anomopoda
- Family: Chydoridae
- Genus: Chydorus; Leach, 1816

Synonyms
- Chilodorus Latreille, 1829

= Chydorus =

Genus of small freshwater animals

Chydorus is a genus of Chydoridae.

The genus was described in 1816 by William Elford Leach.

It has cosmopolitan distribution.

It was found that centers of dispersion of two Chydorus groups were located in the European part of the continent and two others in Asia. One clade survived during harsh conditions of the Pleistocene glaciation in a northern refugium, while another clade survived in the south.

Species include:

- Chydorus gibbus
- Chydorus globosus
- Chydorus latus
- Chydorus ovalis
- Chydorus piger
- Chydorus rylovi Mukhamediev, 1963
- Chydorus sinensis Frey, 1987
- Chydorus sphaericus (O.F. Müller, 1776)
