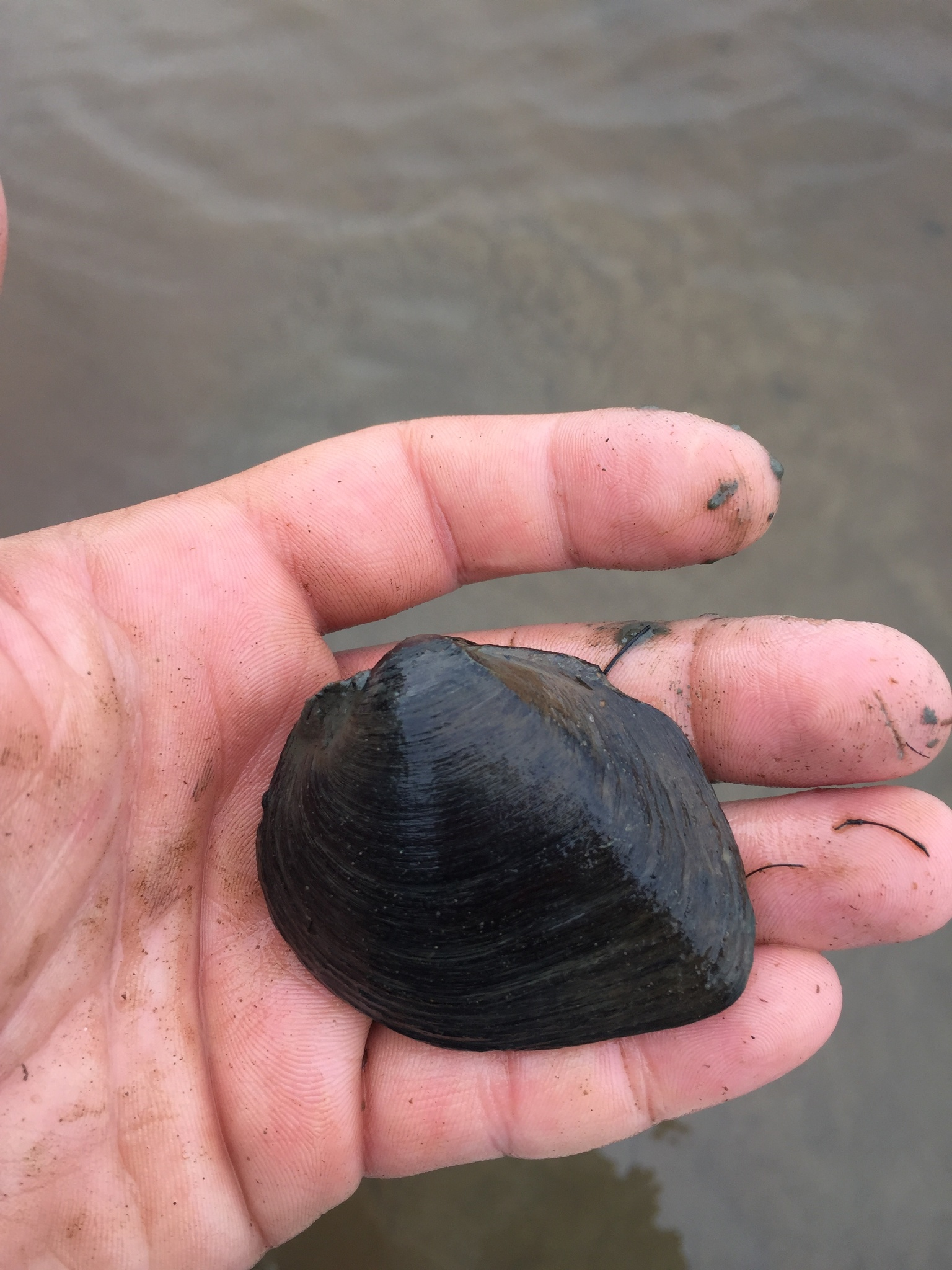

Conservation status
- Endangered (IUCN 2.3)

- Threatened (ESA)

Scientific classification
- Kingdom: Animalia
- Phylum: Mollusca
- Class: Bivalvia
- Order: Unionida
- Family: Unionidae
- Genus: Fusconaia
- Species: F. escambia

Binomial name
- Fusconaia escambia Clench & Turner, 1956
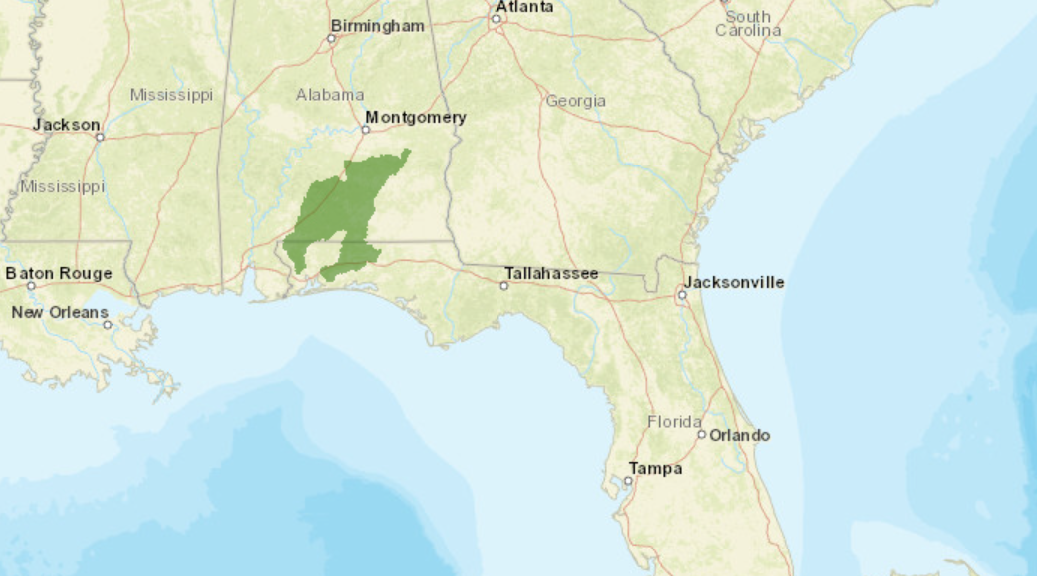
- Range map for narrow pigtoe

= Fusconaia escambia =

Narrow pigtoe

Species of mollusc

Fusconaia escambia, the narrow pigtoe, is a freshwater bivalve mussel found in Alabama and northwestern Florida. The narrow pigtoe was first discovered in the Escambia River in Alabama and Florida.

== Description ==
Narrow pigtoe has a triangular to square shape with a black to reddish-brown color. Narrow pigtoe reaches approximately 75 millimetres (3.0 in) in length as an adult. Its shell is moderately thick with a white- to salmon-colored interior. Narrow pigtoe also has a rainbow pattern near the base of the interior shell.

Narrow pigtoe differs from other Fusconaia species in that it has a slightly different color of shell. Furthermore, narrow pigtoe has a different geographical range, distinctive from other Fusconaia species. Lastly, narrow pigtoe uses distinct fish species to mature. See more on this in the Life History and Ecology sections.

== Life history ==
Little is known about the narrow pigtoe's current life history. Narrow pigtoe typically undergoes reproduction from May to July. However, pregnant females have been found as early as March and as late as October. Narrow pigtoe is known as a short-term brooder, meaning narrow pigtoe will usually develop their eggs for 2–6 weeks.

Generally, freshwater mussels have thousands of offspring to ensure some larvae will grow up and become adults. Males release sperm into the water, and females receive the sperm through special feeding tubes called siphons. The eggs then become fertilized inside the shell of the female. Inside of the shell, the fertilized eggs grow until they reach a mature larva stage. The larvae then attach to host fish and live as parasites feeding off the fish. The feeding helps them transform into juvenile mussels. Juveniles then drop from their respective fish and sink to the bottom of the body of water to mature into adults. Being a freshwater mussel species, it is thought that narrow pigtoe also reproduce and live as such. Narrow pigtoe's geographic location relies on the host fish.

== Ecology ==
=== Diet ===
Narrow pigtoe siphons water into its shell and across the gills to feed. Narrow pigtoe consumes detritus (which is disintegrated organic debris), algae, diatoms, and bacteria. Adults are filter feeders and feed through siphoning water into the shell. Juveniles burrow beneath the ground and are pedal (foot) feeders. In other words, they bring food particles that adhere to the foot inside the shell for ingestion. Foot feeding occurs until the structures for filter feeding are fully developed. Larval stages feed by stealing nutrients from the host fish.

=== Habitat ===
For most freshwater bivalve mussels, the habitat involves slow to moderate currents in small to medium sized rivers or creeks. The narrow pigtoe embeds itself in the ground (which often includes sand, gravel, and silt) as long as it is stable and not disturbed. As stated before, the narrow pigtoe's habitat is also reliant on whether or not its host fish species are present in the area. The narrow pigtoe is sensitive to ecological disturbances and must have little pollution, good water quality, and a secure habitat to grow successfully.

=== Range ===
Narrow pigtoe is found only in the Escambia and Yellow river basins in northwest Florida and southern Alabama. These basins travel south and empty into the Gulf of Mexico. According to the U.S. Fish and Wildlife Services, Fusconaia escambia is currently listed threatened "wherever found". More surveys may be needed to fully assess where this species habitat lies. For example, reproducing Narrow Pigtoe populations were recently found in some areas of Point A Lake and Gantt Lake reservoirs in Alabama.

According to the latest federal registry, which dates back to 2012, the narrow pigtoe lives in 28 locations. Out of 10 sites that the species has historically been located, narrow pigtoe was found in 7. A recent paper quantized all the surveys done to locate this species. They were split into two groups: pre- and post-2008. Of 267 surveys, 45.3% were positive post-2008, while only 32.2% out of 236 surveys were positive pre-2008. Despite this increase, it is important to remember that there was also an increase in the sites where this species was found since 2008. Additionally, there has been a loss of identified species in historical areas where this species was known to live. Taken together, this shows that more information about the species geographical location is needed.

=== Behavior ===
Narrow pigtoe males mate by releasing sperm into the water. The sperm disperse and find their way into female shells through filter feeding. Much of the mating and reproductive processes are reliant on the host fish to which the larvae attach. Larvae easily attach to their fish hosts and develop when the fish are abundant. However as the fish become less abundant in areas where there are reproducing mussels, the larvae are not able to develop into juveniles. Narrow pigtoe are filter feeders and they feed on nutrients close to the ground including detritus. Adults are better able to filter feed after their siphons develop. Juveniles must feed by extending their foot to capture prey. Juveniles perform this action until their siphons are sufficiently developed.

== Conservation ==
=== Population changes ===
The current population size is unknown, but a survey of the Escambia drainage in 2012 found 166 organisms. Additionally, a study noted that there was an increase in the percentage of positive surveys of narrow pigtoe in the period after 2008 when compared with the period of time preceding 2008. This is indicative of an increase in narrow pigtoe species population over time, although this is still unclear.

=== Geographic range changes ===
Narrow pigtoe still occur in much of their known range and have also been spotted in new places. A survey of narrow pigtoe species conducted in 2012 noted occurrences in 28 sites. This is an increase from the previous 13 sites, indicating that the geographic range of the narrow pigtoe has spread.

== Threats ==
Knowledge of threats to the narrow pigtoe is lacking in general. However, degradation and loss of river habitats, poor water quality, catastrophic events, and invasive species could all potentially pose threats to the narrow pigtoe.

=== Endangered Species Act listing ===
Narrow pigtoe was petitioned to be listed under the Endangered Species Act of 1973 (ESA) on September 27, 2011 and was listed as a threatened species under the ESA on October 10, 2012, taking effect on November 9.

=== 5-year review ===
The US Fish and WIldlife Services initiated a 5-year review for the narrow pigtoe on April 11, 2019. To date, there has been no completed 5 year review for the narrow pigtoe.

=== Species status assessment ===
No species status assessment is currently available for narrow pigtoe on the ECOS database.

=== Recovery plan ===
A recovery plan for the narrow pigtoe was published on November 13, 2012. The plan notes that the narrow pigtoe has a low recovery potential. The plan states three tenets for promoting the conservation of the narrow pigtoe.

- Use existing rules to create strategies for the management of streams
- Encourage the public to limit their actions that harm the aquatic ecosystem
- Continue to promote research on the narrow pigtoe to increase understanding

Despite this, there is no documented implementation progress of this recovery plan.

=== Critical habitat ===
The critical habitat for narrow pigtoe has also been determined. The narrow pigtoe requires freshwater and constant movement of water. Narrow pigtoe also requires space to grow and feed. The oxygen and pH requirements for living are not known.
