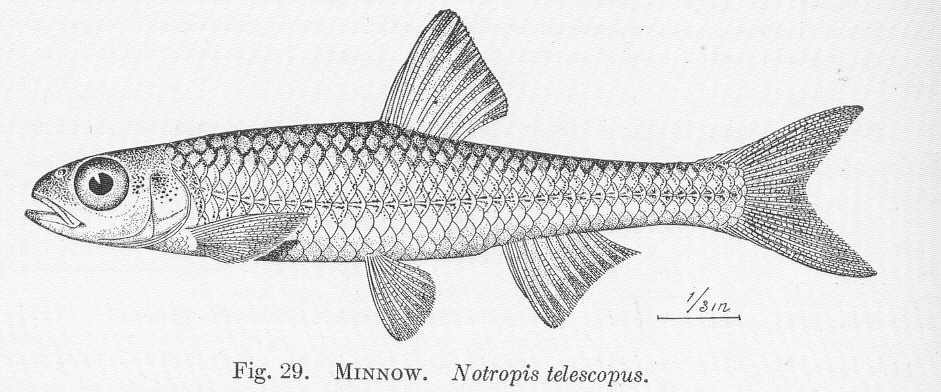

Conservation status
- Least Concern (IUCN 3.1)

Scientific classification
- Kingdom: Animalia
- Phylum: Chordata
- Class: Actinopterygii
- Order: Cypriniformes
- Family: Leuciscidae
- Subfamily: Pogonichthyinae
- Genus: Notropis
- Species: N. telescopus

Binomial name
- Notropis telescopus (Cope, 1868)

Synonyms
- Photogenis telescopus Cope, 1868

= Telescope shiner =

Species of fish

The telescope shiner (Notropis telescopus) is a species of freshwater ray-finned fish beloinging to the family Leuciscidae, the shiners, daces and minnows. Notropis telescopus is primarily found in a small range of waters located in the Southeastern Region of the United States. There is very little published record of the research and management involving the telescope shiner. The following research will provide information on this species that can be helpful toward monitoring efforts of Notropis telescopus populations. The primary population of telescope shiners occurs throughout drainages of the Tennessee and Cumberland rivers. This population is distributed throughout Virginia, Kentucky, Tennessee, and Alabama. A second known population occurs in Arkansas and Missouri and is found in the White and Black river systems.

The telescope shiner gets its name due to the relatively large eye it possesses compared to other Notropis species. Adult telescopus usually have a length range from 50 to 105 millimetres (2.0 to 4.1 in). Unlike some other shiners and darters, the telescope shiner is not known for any outstanding coloration.

Notropis telescopus occurs in cooler waters such as quick moving streams and small rivers. They can be found in riffle, run, and pool habitats. According to studies the telescope shiner can do better than other similar species when in waters with higher levels of pH, alkalinity, magnesium, and dissolved oxygen. When it comes to feeding, the telescope shiner is classified as an insectivore. Telescope shiners are classified in the spawning guild lithophil. They prefer open rock and gravel to spawn in. Embryos hatch early and stay hidden under the rocks. Notropis species are multiple batch spawners with strong seasonality to gonadal size and condition. The peak of their spawning is usually between April and July. Current monitoring and management is done by government agencies. Most of these surveys are not specific to the telescope shiner, but rather to determine overall biotic integrity of the streams and river systems.
