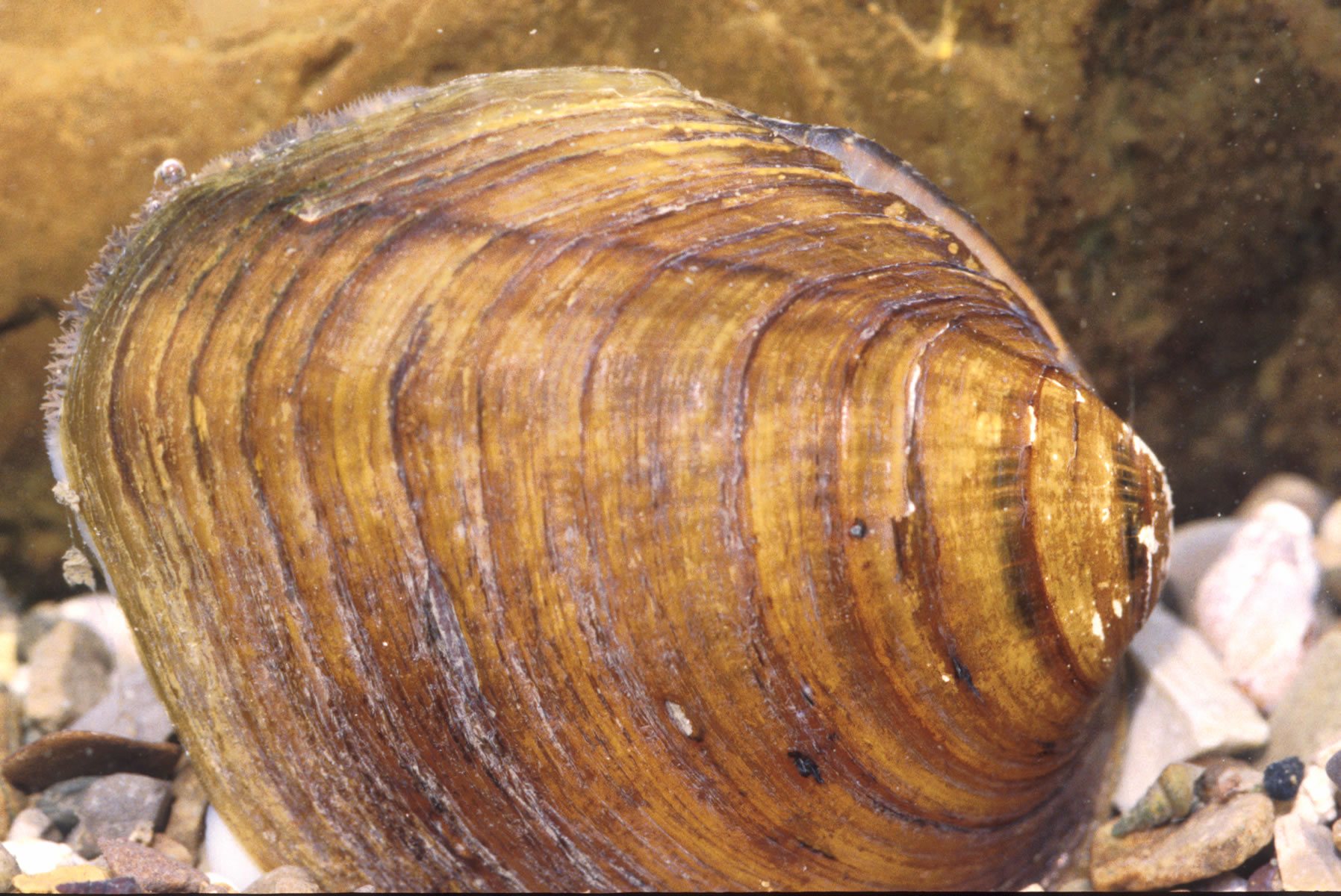
- Fusconaia subrotunda

Scientific classification
- Kingdom: Animalia
- Phylum: Mollusca
- Class: Bivalvia
- Order: Unionida
- Family: Unionidae
- Tribe: Pleurobemini
- Genus: Fusconaia; Simpson, 1900

Species
- See text

= Fusconaia =

Genus of bivalves

Fusconaia is a genus of freshwater mussels, aquatic bivalve mollusks in the family Unionidae. They are native to North America.

== Species within the genus Fusconaia ==
Species include:

- Fusconaia askewi
- Fusconaia burkei (Tapered pigtoe)
- Fusconaia cor (Shiny pigtoe)
- Fusconaia cuneolus (Fine-rayed pigtoe pearly mussel)
- Fusconaia escambia (Narrow pigtoe)
- Fusconaia flava (Wabash pigtoe)
- Fusconaia masoni (Atlantic pigtoe)
- Fusconaia mitchelli (False spike)
- Fusconaia ozarkensis
- Fusconaia subrotunda (Long solid mussel)
