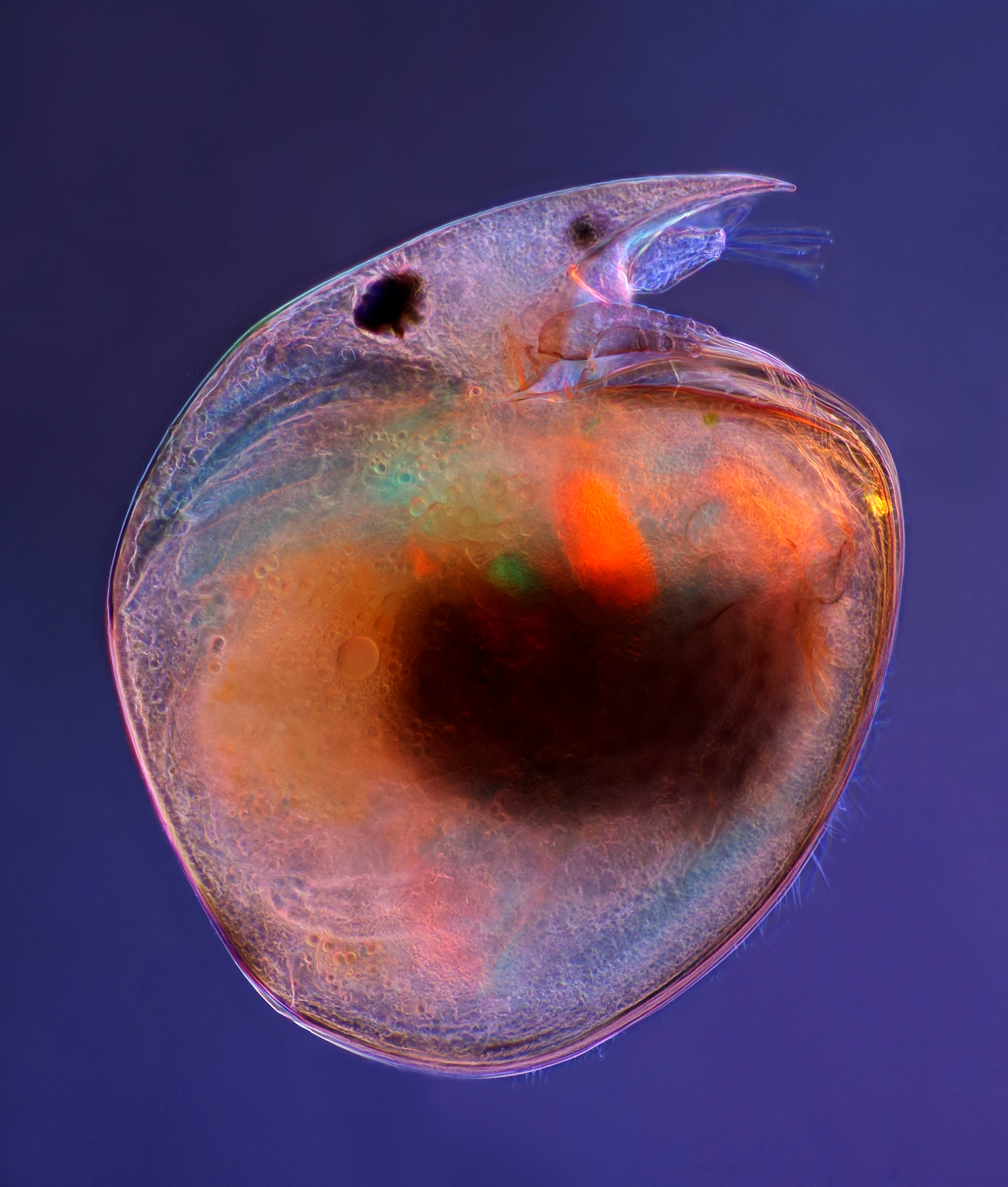
- Chydorus sp.

Scientific classification
- Kingdom: Animalia
- Phylum: Arthropoda
- Clade: Pancrustacea
- Class: Branchiopoda
- Superorder: Diplostraca
- Order: Anomopoda
- Family: Chydoridae; Stebbing, 1902

= Chydoridae =

Family of small freshwater animals

Chydoridae is a family of water fleas in the order Anomopoda. There are more than 50 genera and 520 described species in Chydoridae. A lot of Chydoridae species are non-native species, many of which pose a great threat to aquatic ecosystems.

== Genera ==
These 52 genera belong to the family Chydoridae:

- Acroperus Baird, 1843
- Alona Baird, 1850
- Alonella G. O. Sars, 1862
- Alonopsis G. O. Sars, 1862
- Alpinalona Alonso & Sinev, 2017
- Anchistropus G. O. Sars, 1862
- Anthalona van Damme, Sinev & Dumont, 2011
- Archepleuroxus Smirnov & Timms, 1983
- Armatalona Sinev, 2004
- Australochydorus Smirnov & Timms, 1983
- Biapertura Smirnov, 1971
- Bryospilus Frey, 1980
- Camptocercus Baird, 1843
- Celsinotum Frey, 1991
- Chydorus Leach, 1816
- Coronatella Dybowski & Grochowski, 1894
- Dadaya G. O. Sars, 1901
- Disparalona Fryer, 1968
- Dumontiellus Smirnov, 2007
- Dunhevedia King, 1853
- Ephemeroporus Frey, 1982
- Ephmeroporus
- Euryalona G. O. Sars, 1901
- Eurycercus Baird, 1843
- Extremalona Sinev & Shiel, 2012
- Geoffreya Kotov, Sinev & Berrios, 2010
- Graptoleberis G. O. Sars, 1862
- Indialona Petkovski, 1966
- Karualona Dumont and Silva-Briano, 2000
- Kisakiellus Sousa & Elmoor-Loureiro, 2018
- Kurzia Dybowski and Grochowski, 1894
- Leberis Smirnov, 1989
- Leydigia Kurtz, 1874
- Maraura Sinev & Shiel, 2008
- Matralona van Damme & Dumont, 2009
- Miralona Sinev, 2004
- Monope Smirnov & Timms, 1983
- Monospilus G. O. Sars, 1861
- Notoalona Rajapaksa and Fernando, 1987
- Ovalona van Damme & Dumont, 2008
- Oxyurella Dybowski and Grochowski, 1894
- Paralona Sramek-Husek, Straskraba and Brtek, 1962
- Parvalona Van Damme, Kotov & Dumont, 2005
- Peracantha Baird, 1843
- Picripleuroxus Frey, 1993
- Pleuroxus Baird, 1843
- Pseudochydorus Fryer, 1968
- Rak Smirnov & Timms, 1983
- Rheoalona Sinev, Tiang-Nga & Sanoamuang, 2017
- Rhynchochydorus Smirnov & Timms, 1983
- Rhynchotalona Norman, 1903
- Saycia Sars, 1904
- Tretocephala D.G.Frey, 1965

== Evolution and biogeography ==
The family Chydoridae has served as a primary model for rejecting the concept of cosmopolitanism (the "everything is everywhere" hypothesis) in microscopic freshwater animals. Early comprehensive morphological revisions by D.G. Frey demonstrated that supposedly widespread chydorid taxa are actually complexes of species with restricted, often endemic, distributions.

Modern molecular phylogeography has strongly supported and expanded this paradigm. Integrative taxonomic studies have revealed deep cryptic diversity within morphologically uniform taxa, indicating that many "widely distributed" species are actually complexes of ancient lineages. For example, phylogeographic analysis of the Chydorus sphaericus species complex in the Northern Palearctic identified multiple distinct clades that survived Pleistocene glaciations in separate refugia (e.g., in Europe and Beringia). The Yenisey River basin in central Eurasia was identified as a "suture zone" where these previously isolated European and Beringian lineages came into secondary contact.

Similarly, recent multilocus studies on the Pleuroxus genus have demonstrated general morphological stasis, where deeply divergent genetic lineages (separated by millions of years) remain morphologically almost indistinguishable. The Eurasian Pleuroxus aduncus species group was found to be paraphyletic, containing a cryptic Siberian species (Pleuroxus korovchinskyi) and giving rise to the highly derived, denticulated Pleuroxus truncatus. These findings highlight the complex historical biogeography of chydorids and underscore the necessity of continued integrative taxonomic revisions of cladoceran taxa.
