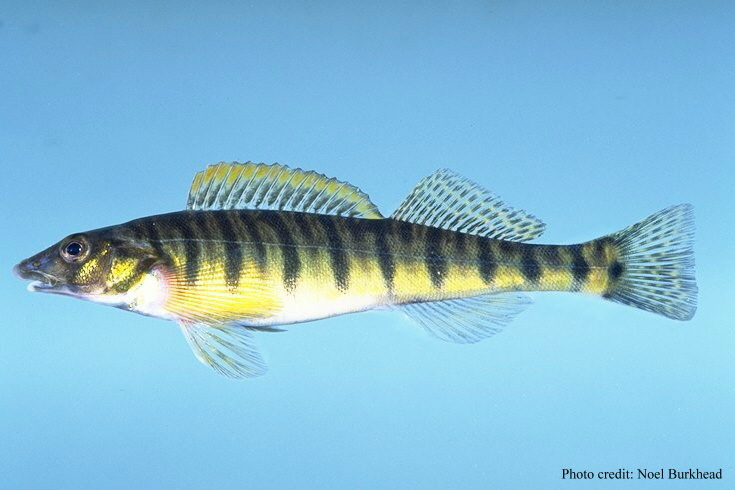
- Mobile logperch, Percina kathae

Scientific classification
- Kingdom: Animalia
- Phylum: Chordata
- Class: Actinopterygii
- Order: Perciformes
- Family: Percidae
- Subfamily: Etheostomatinae
- Genus: Percina

= Logperch =

Logperches

Group of species of fish

Logperches are a group of ray-finned fish in the genus Percina of the family Percidae.

There are 11 species of logperch, native to eastern parts of the United States and Canada. The fish inhabit clear, gravelly streams and lakes. Percina caprodes is the most widespread of the species; some of the species with more restricted distribution are threatened in various ways. Due to their small size, the fish are not normally harvested for food. Habitat alteration and inappropriate land use practices are the most common population stressors.

== Characteristics ==
The logperch is commonly found as a baby and around 6 to 9 cm (2.4 to 3.5 in) in length, it has features like small black dots on the surface, elongated front fins, and a long skinny body, reaching a maximum size of about 18 cm (7.1 in) and a maximum age of about three years.

== Species ==
- Percina austroperca – Southern logperch
- Percina bimaculata – Chesapeake logperch (often included in P. caprodes)
- Percina burtoni – Blotchside logperch
- Percina caprodes – Common logperch (or simply "logperch")
- Percina carbonaria (Baird & Girard, 1853) – Texas logperch
- Percina fulvitaenia Morris & Page, 1981 – Ozark logperch
- Percina jenkinsi – Conasauga logperch
- Percina kathae Thompson, 1997 – Mobile logperch
- Percina macrolepida Stevenson, 1971 – Bigscale logperch
- Percina rex – Roanoke logperch
- Percina suttkusi Thompson, 1997 – Gulf logperch
