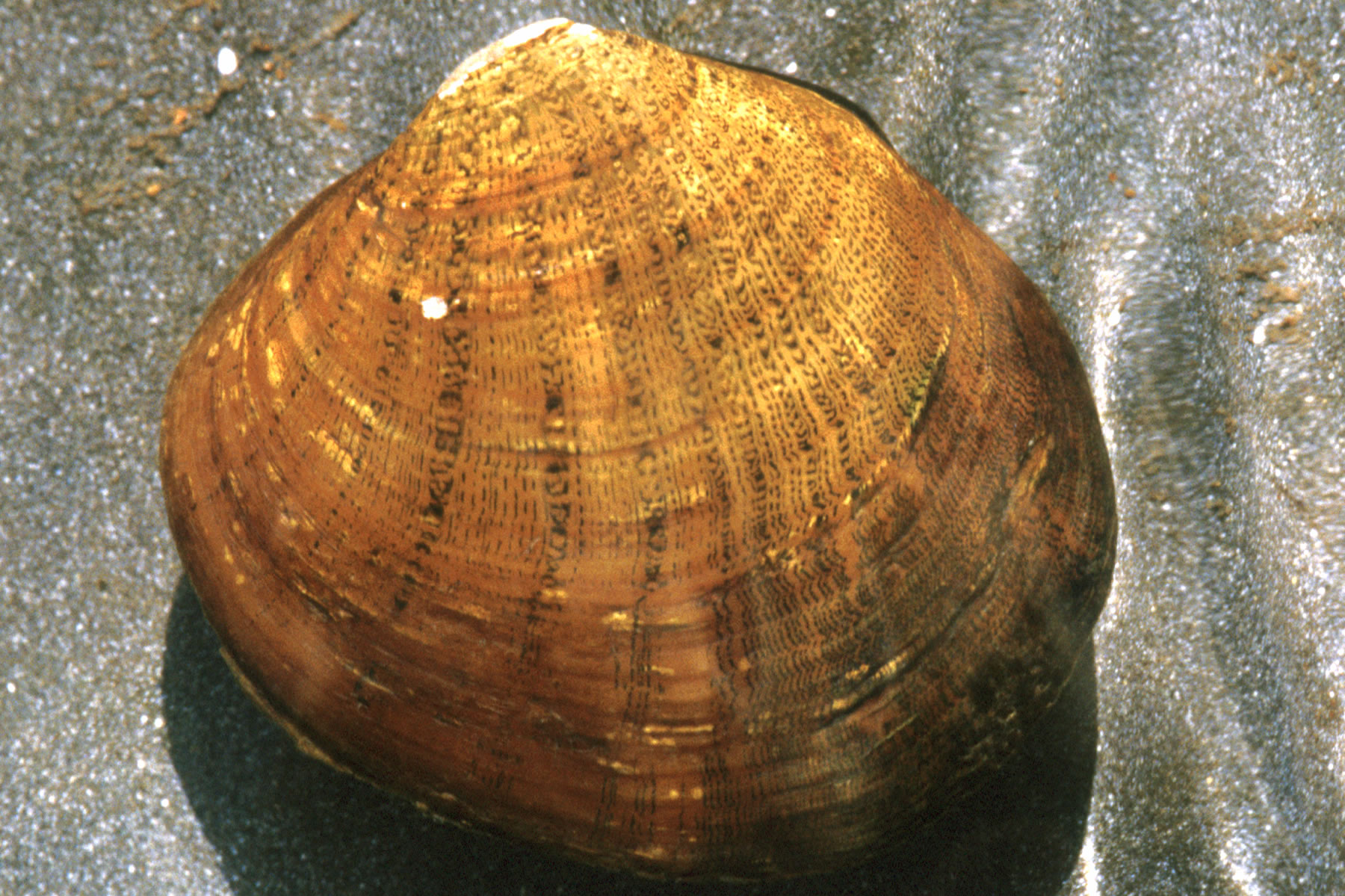

Conservation status
- Critically Endangered (IUCN 2.3)
- CITES Appendix I (CITES)

Scientific classification
- Kingdom: Animalia
- Phylum: Mollusca
- Class: Bivalvia
- Order: Unionida
- Family: Unionidae
- Tribe: Lampsilini
- Genus: Dromus; Simpson, 1900
- Species: D. dromas

Binomial name
- Dromus dromas (I. Lea, 1834)

Synonyms
- Dromus dromas dromas (Lea, 1834); Dromus dromas caperatus (Lea, 1845); Unio dromas Lea, 1834; Unio caperatus Lea, 1845; Unio abacoides Haldeman, 1846

= Dromus dromas =

Species of bivalve

Dromus dromas, the dromedary pearlymussel or dromedary naiad, is a rare species of freshwater mussel in the family Unionidae. This aquatic bivalve mollusk is native to the Cumberland and Tennessee River systems in the United States, where it has experienced a large population decline. It is a federally listed endangered species of the United States.

This mussel is yellow-green in color with interrupted green rays on the shell. The nacre is white, pink, or reddish. The species got its name from the distinctive hump on the shell of larger individuals. A "headwaters form," D. dromas form caperatus (Lea, 1845) has additionally been described.

This species lives in clear, clean, fast-flowing water. It cannot tolerate water of poor quality, for example, water with silt.

Like other freshwater mussels, this species reproduces by releasing larvae called glochidia into the water. The glochidia are eaten by fish and lodge in the fish's gills, where they develop into juvenile mussels. Fish hosts for this mussel species include black sculpin (Cottus baileyi), greenside darter (Etheostoma blennioides), fantail darter (Etheostoma flabellare), snubnose darter (Etheostoma simoterum), tangerine darter (Percina aurantiaca), blotchside logperch (Percina burtoni), logperch (Percina caprodes), channel darter (Percina copelandi), gilt darter (Percina evides), and Roanoke darter (Percina roanoka).

This species was historically one of the most common mussels in the Tennessee and Cumberland rivers. In 1978, however, only three living specimens could be found during a Tennessee River survey, all from the Chickamauga Reservoir. Similarly, two live individuals were found in a Cumberland River survey in 1976, with another individual located in a commercial mussel fisherman's boat, while dead specimens were found at a rock-quarry clammer's camp. Today, the species has been reduced to no more than four populations (two of which are experimental and non-essential). It has been extirpated from the wild in the state of Alabama, but it has been reintroduced there (experimental population). The only remaining reproducing populations occur in the Clinch and Powell Rivers. Reproducing populations remain in under 10% of the mussel's historical range, and the populations are disjunct.

Factors contributing to its decline include the impoundment of waterways, increased silt, and pollution from sewage, coal mining, and oil and gas drilling.

Between 2016 and 2019, mass die-offs of D. dromas, possibly attributable to viral diseases, occurred in the Clinch River population.
