= Sickle darter =

Conservation status
- Vulnerable (IUCN 3.1)

- Threatened (ESA)

Scientific classification
- Kingdom: Animalia
- Phylum: Chordata
- Class: Actinopterygii
- Division: Teleostei
- Order: Perciformes
- Family: Percidae
- Genus: Percina
- Species: P. williamsi

Binomial name
- Percina williamsi Page & Near, 2007

Species of fish

The sickle darter (Percina williamsi) is a recently identified freshwater ray-finned fish, a darter from the subfamily Etheostomatinae, part of the family Percidae, which also contains the perches, ruffes and pikeperches. It is closely related to a well-known darter, Percina macrocephala. Discovered in 2007 in the upper Tennessee River drainage, the sickle darter is around 90.5 mm (3.56 in) in length and is a slender bodied, freshwater and benthopelagic fish that most likely feeds on small crayfish and mayflies, since it shares a large mouth and long snout with its sister species. The known distribution of the sickle darter is the upper drainage of the Tennessee River of Tennessee, North Carolina and Virginia. It is distinguished from all other Percina darters except its sister species P. macrocephala by a dark suborbital bar and a black bar subtending a medial black spot on the base of the caudal fin. It stays in mostly rocky, sandy, or silty substrates in clear creeks or small rivers in the Appalachian Mountains. The sickle darter spawns in late winter in gravel shoals. It also has large scales which make it different from macrocephala. It is known to be extirpated from most of its home habitat mainly because of agricultural practices that cause siltation and turbidity which causes most populations of the sickle darter to be widely scattered. But where it is found, it can be observed with regularity. Taking all this into consideration, the sickle darter does not have a formal conservation status under any federal or state law although its closely related species is considered a species of concern by the TWRA. Future management plans should include finding more locations of the sickle darter and decreasing further habitat destruction in known distributions by stating it as a fish of concern by state law.

== Geographic distribution ==
As of right now the sickle darter has been found mostly in the upper Tennessee River drainage of Tennessee, Virginia, and North Carolina. It has also been caught in the French Broad System of Tennessee and Virginia, the Emory River in Tennessee, the Holston and Clinch Rivers of Tennessee and Virginia and low densities in the Little River in Blount County Tennessee. The largest specimen of the sickle darter was found in the Holston River with a length of 90.5 mm. Due to this distribution, they are considered a subtropical fish. Before 2007, the sickle darter was considered to be part of the species of longhead darter (Percina macrocephala) so it has been recently classified as a new species of fish of which not much information has been found. They can be seen regularly in their inhabited rivers but outside of them and in between their distributions you would be hard pressed to find a sickle darter. This is most likely due to agricultural, municipal, and industrial practices casing siltation and increased turbidity which is a human made enemy of this darter.

== Ecology ==
The sickle darter is a larger darter than its sister species Percina macrocephala which suggests that it inhabits larger flowing pools, 1 meter deep or more. It is a benthic fish so it swims a few centimeters above the substrate near woody debris or vegetation where they capture their prey. Rocky, sandy and silty substrates in clear creeks and small rivers are known homes to the sickle darter where it swims in the water currents. Because of its small size specific habitat variables such as water velocity and sedimentation measurements are hard to access so no definite numbers can be given as to its abiotic factors. Not much is known about its diet yet but its close sister darter, the longhead, eats crayfish and mayflies suggesting that the sickle darter preys on these same species. Known predators are most likely larger piscivores though not many species prey upon the sickle darter due to its place in the water flow. Its competitors are other darters such as the tangerine darter, logperch, and the longhead darter. Due to increased human activity causing turbidity and siltation which the sickle darters are keenly intolerant of, its habitats are steadily decreasing and so are its numbers.

== Life history ==
Sickle darters spawn in late winter in shallow gravel shoals and are polyandrous. They breed once annually by depositing sperm and egg into a shallow hole and then cover them up to protect them. Average clutch size is around 350 eggs. In one female sickle darter that was caught, its mature ova equaled 27% of her body mass and had 355 eggs present. After spawning both parents leave the nests buried in shallow shoals until the eggs hatch. Sexual maturity is usually reached around 11 to 13 months in male darters and 22 to 25 months in female darters while its average lifespan is around three years with a maximum around four. Compared to smaller darters such as the Etheostoma species, the sickle darters have higher egg production, a longer spawning season and grow faster than their smaller counterparts due to their body size. It is characterized by a long slender body and a long snout, a complete straight and black lateral line and a spot between dorsal fins. It also has larger scales than the longhead from which it was put under until 2007. Silt deposits and increased turbidity from human practices are known to significantly decrease nests by smothering eggs and larvae.

== Conservation ==
The sickle darter is widely seen in a few streams but is widely scattered between them and has been extirpated in North Carolina, is rare in Virginia, and is considered threatened in Tennessee. Even though this has all been proven, the sickle darter has yet to be put on any state or federal conservation list with other darters such as the ashy darter, logperch, and the longhead. Because the sickle darter was just considered a new species in 2007, not many management practices have been put forth to conserve it because so little is known about it. Ongoing research is being done to learn more about the sickle darter but until then no sure fire management plan can be put forth to help maintain steady populations. No non-government agencies or organizations are providing effective areas of conservation which does not help its declining populations and decreasing habitat.

The most damaging impacts on the sickle darter are agricultural, industrial and municipal practices which are causing increased turbidity and siltation which destroy both nests and living habitats for the sickle darter. Other causes for destruction are chemical pollution from coal mining and other practices as well as impoundments and other habitat barriers which cause decreased spawning and declining current populations. Of these, siltation is the most damaging mostly because it is destroying numerous darter nests which stops future generations to mature. Agricultural practices such as silviculture should be put into place to regulate practices at or near streams and rivers.

== Taxonomy ==
The sickle darter was first formally described in 2007 by the American ichthyologists Lawrence M. Page and Thomas J. Near, with the type locality given as 4.0 kilometers east of Broadford, Virginia. and its specific name honors the ichthyologist James David Williams.
