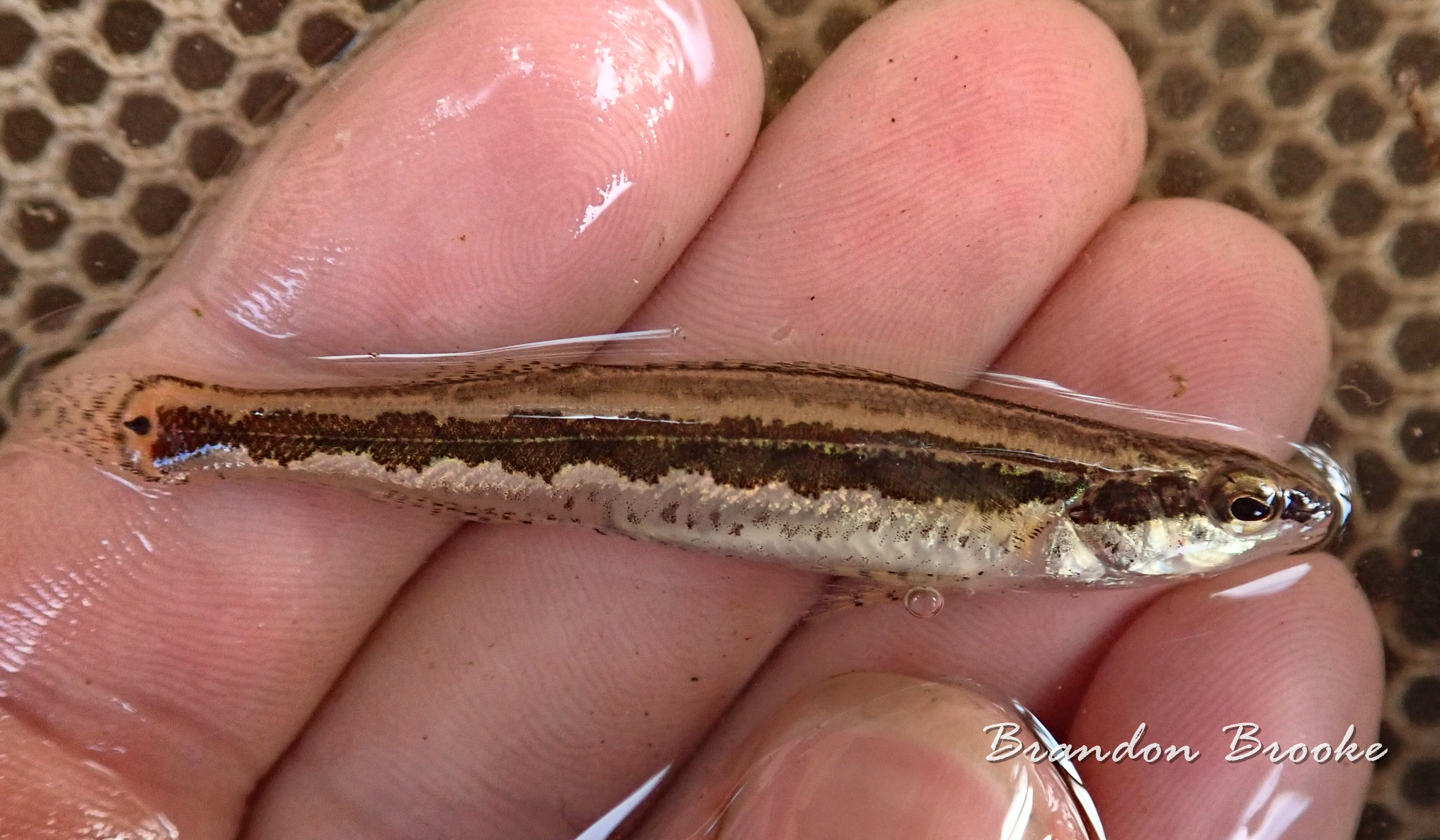

Conservation status
- Vulnerable (IUCN 3.1)

Scientific classification
- Kingdom: Animalia
- Phylum: Chordata
- Class: Actinopterygii
- Division: Teleostei
- Order: Perciformes
- Family: Percidae
- Genus: Percina
- Species: P. cymatotaenia

Binomial name
- Percina cymatotaenia (Gilbert & Meek, 1887)

Synonyms
- Etheostoma cymatotaenia Gilbert & Meek, 1887

= Bluestripe darter =

Species of fish

The bluestripe darter (Percina cymatotaenia) is a species of freshwater ray-finned fish, a darter from the subfamily Etheostomatinae, part of the family Percidae, which also contains the perches, ruffes and pikeperches.

This fish was an endangered species on the IUCN Red List in 1996. In a 2003 reevaluation it was downlisted to vulnerable status when the populations were determined to be mostly stable overall.

== Distribution and habitat ==
The bluestripe darter is endemic to Missouri where it has a localized distribution in streams of the Osage and Gasconade systems of the northern Ozarks.

The fish lives in small to medium-sized rivers where it strongly associates with aquatic vegetation.

== Life cycle ==
The bluestripe darter is believed to spawn in March and early April. During spawning males become aggressive and will undergo a dramatic rapid color change during which usual middorsal and midlateral stripes fade and are replaced by a series of discrete, intensely black bars. Most bluestripe darter are sexually mature in a year. Males and females grow at similar rates with a maximum lifespan of about four years.
