= Appalachia darter =

Conservation status
- Least Concern (IUCN 3.1)

Scientific classification
- Kingdom: Animalia
- Phylum: Chordata
- Class: Actinopterygii
- Order: Perciformes
- Family: Percidae
- Genus: Percina
- Species: P. gymnocephala

Binomial name
- Percina gymnocephala Beckham, 1980

Species of fish

The Appalachia darter (Percina gymnocephala) is a small species of freshwater ray-finned fish, a darter from the subfamily Etheostomatinae, part of the family Percidae, which also contains the perches, ruffes and pikeperches. It is found in the New River system above Kanawha Falls.

== Habitat and Ecology ==
It exists only in small to medium rivers, and lives in gravel, rubble riffles, and raceways in spring and early summer, in moves to slower deeper waters for remainder of year.

== Threats and Conservation ==
Localized threats may exist, but on a range-wide scale no major threats are known. Listed as Least Concern in view of the large extent of occurrence, large number of subpopulations, large population size, and lack of major threats. The trend over the past 10 years or three generations is uncertain but likely relatively stable, or the species may be declining but not fast enough to qualify for any of the threatened categories under Criterion A (reduction in population size). Currently, this species is of relatively low conservation concern and does not require significant additional protection or major management, monitoring, or research action.
