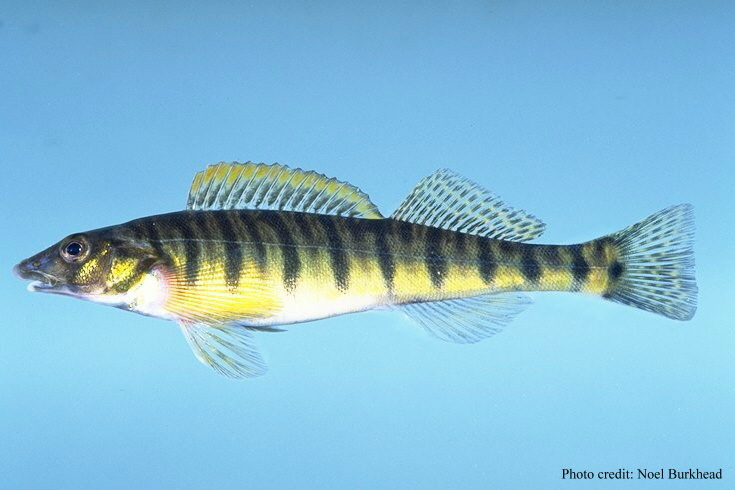
- Percina kathae

Scientific classification
- Kingdom: Animalia
- Phylum: Chordata
- Class: Actinopterygii
- Order: Perciformes
- Family: Percidae
- Subfamily: Etheostomatinae
- Genus: Percina; Haldeman, 1842

Type species
- Perca (Percina) nebulosa Haldeman,1842

= Percina =

Logperches and roughbelly darters

Genus of fishes

Percina is a genus of small freshwater ray-finned fish belonging to the subfamily Etheostomatinae, which is part of the family Percidae. The Percidae family also includes the perches, ruffes and pikeperches from North America. Along with similar fishes in other genera, members of Percina are commonly known as "darters". More specifically, the genus as a whole is known as roughbelly darters, while certain species of Percina displaying vertical bars on their flanks are called logperches.

== Species ==
There are currently 49 recognized species in this genus:

- Percina antesella J. D. Williams & Etnier, 1978 (Amber darter)
- Percina apristis C. L. Hubbs & Hubbs, 1954 (Guadalupe darter)
- Percina aurantiaca Cope, 1868 (Tangerine darter)
- Percina aurolineata Suttkus & Ramsey, 1967 (Goldline darter)
- Percina aurora Suttkus & B. A. Thompson, 1994 (Pearl darter)
- Percina austroperca B. A. Thompson, 1995 (Southern logperch)
- Percina bimaculata Haldeman, 1844 (Chesapeake logperch)
- Percina brevicauda Suttkus & Bart, 1994 (Coal darter)
- Percina brucethompsoni Robinson, Cashner & Near, 2014 (Ouachita darter)
- Percina burtoni Fowler, 1945 (Blotchside darter)
- Percina caprodes Rafinesque, 1810 (Common logperch)
- Percina carbonaria Baird & Girard, 1853 (Texas logperch)
- Percina copelandi D. S. Jordan, 1877 (Channel darter)
- Percina crassa D. S. Jordan & Brayton, 1878 (Piedmont darter)
- Percina crypta M. C. Freeman, B. J. Freeman, Burkhead & Straight, 2008 (Halloween darter)
- Percina cymatotaenia Gilbert & Meek, 1887 (Bluestripe darter)
- Percina evides D. S. Jordan & Copeland, 1877 (Gilt darter)
- Percina freemanorum Near, MacGuigan, Boring, Simmons, Albanese, Keck, Harrington & Dinkins, 2021 (Etowah bridled darter)
- Percina fulvitaenia Morris & Page, 1981 (Ozark logperch)
- Percina gymnocephala Beckham, 1980 (Appalachia darter)
- Percina jenkinsi B. A. Thompson, 1985 (Conasauga logperch)
- Percina kathae B. A. Thompson, 1997 (Mobile logperch)
- Percina kusha J. D. Williams & Burkhead, 2007 (Bridled darter)
- Percina lenticula Richards & L. W. Knapp, 1964 (Freckled darter)
- Percina macrocephala Cope, 1867 (Longhead darter)
- Percina macrolepida Stevenson, 1971 (Bigscale logperch)
- Percina maculata Girard, 1859 (Blackside darter)
- Percina nasuta Bailey, 1941 (Longnose darter)
- Percina nevisense Cope, 1870 (Chainback darter)
- Percina nigrofasciata Agassiz, 1854 (Blackbanded darter)
- Percina notogramma Raney & C. L. Hubbs, 1948 (Stripeback darter)
- Percina oxyrhynchus C. L. Hubbs & Raney, 1939 (Sharpnose darter)
- Percina palmaris Bailey, 1940 (Bronze darter)
- Percina pantherina Moore & Reeves, 1955 (Leopard darter)
- Percina peltata Stauffer, 1864 (Shield darter)
- Percina phoxocephala E. W. Nelson, 1876 (Slenderhead darter)
- Percina rex D. S. Jordan & Evermann, 1889 (Roanoke logperch)
- Percina roanoka D. S. Jordan & O. P. Jenkins, 1889 (Roanoke darter)
- Percina sciera Swain, 1883 (Dusky darter)
- Percina shumardi Girard, 1859 (River darter)
- Percina sipsi J. D. Williams & Neely, 2007 (Bankhead darter)
- Percina smithvanizi J. D. Williams & Walsh, 2007 (Muscadine darter)
- Percina squamata Gilbert & Swain, 1887 (Olive darter)
- Percina stictogaster Burr & Page, 1993 (Frecklebelly darter)
- Percina suttkusi B. A. Thompson, 1997 (Gulf logperch)
- Percina tanasi Etnier, 1976 (Snail darter)
- Percina uranidea D. S. Jordan & Gilbert, 1887 (Stargazing darter)
- Percina vigil O. P. Hay, 1882 (Saddleback darter)
- Percina westfalli (Fowler, 1942) (Sooty-banded darter)
- Percina williamsi Page & Near, 2007 (Sickle darter)
