= Percina kusha =

Bridled darter

Conservation status
- Endangered (IUCN 3.1)

Scientific classification
- Kingdom: Animalia
- Phylum: Chordata
- Class: Actinopterygii
- Order: Perciformes
- Family: Percidae
- Genus: Percina
- Species: P. kusha

Binomial name
- Percina kusha J. D. Williams & Burkhead, 2007

Species of fish

Percina kusha, the bridled darter, is a species of freshwater ray-finned fish. It is a darter from the subfamily Etheostomatinae, part of the family Percidae, which also contains the perches, ruffes and pikeperches. It is one of the 324 fish species found in Tennessee, United States.

== Geographic distribution ==
The species is found in the Coosa River in Georgia and Tennessee, the upper reaches of the Conasauga River, and the Etowah River.

== Ecology ==
The Bridled darter is a small freshwater fish only found in southern states. It prefers a habitat in flowing pools and riffles in smaller rivers with structures such as submerged logs and aquatic vegetation. It is typically found in places with good water quality, and gravel or sandy substrates. Only being identified in Georgia and Tennessee, it naturally occurs in low abundance.

== Reproduction and history ==
The species' spawning season ranges from mid April to June with water temperatures of 14–21 °C (57–70 °F). Competitive behavior has been exhibited by males during this season, where larger fish chase off smaller, weaker males. The eggs typically experience an incubation period of about a week. The Bridled darter has a short life span of around 3 years. It has been considered endangered before, but is now believed to be vulnerable.

== Characteristics ==
The name of the species derives from a distinct stripe, continuous from the front to behind the snout, that looks like a horse's bridle. The fish lacks bright colors; males and females look similar, although males are a more dusky color. There is a series of overlapping circular, dark blotches along both sides. It reaches a maximum of 3 inches. It is found closer to the surface because it retains a swim bladder. Its diet consists of small invertebrates such as mayfly nymphs and blackfly larvae. It has been observed feeding off submerged surfaces and strategically waiting for food to get washed downstream.
