= Coal darter =

Conservation status
- Endangered (IUCN 3.1)

Scientific classification
- Kingdom: Animalia
- Phylum: Chordata
- Class: Actinopterygii
- Division: Teleostei
- Order: Perciformes
- Family: Percidae
- Genus: Percina
- Species: P. brevicauda

Binomial name
- Percina brevicauda Suttkus & Bart, 1994

Species of fish

The coal darter (Percina brevicauda) is a small species of freshwater ray-finned fish, a darter from the subfamily Etheostomatinae, part of the family Percidae, which also contains the perches, ruffes and pikeperches. It is found in eastern Mobile Bay basin, Alabama. The species' stronghold is in the main channel of the Cahaba River, primarily above the Fall Line. It prefers gravel runs and riffles of small to medium-sized rivers.

The greatest threats to the species are the effects of pollution and urbanization. There are serious water quality problems during low water periods in the upper portion of the Cahaba River. The upper Cahaba River receives approximately half of its flow from waste water treatment plants and encompasses about 2/3 of the known range. Additionally, continued urbanization is resulting in increased siltation. Impoundments have fragmented the range.

== Conservation status ==
In December 2023, the U.S. Fish and Wildlife Service proposed listing the coal darter as a threatened species under the U.S. Endangered Species Act, citing the species' disappearance from roughly half of its historical range within the Black Warrior, Cahaba, and lower Coosa river systems. As of early 2026 the agency had not finalized the listing. On April 7, 2026, the Center for Biological Diversity sued the Fish and Wildlife Service over the delay, noting that the administration had not finalized Endangered Species Act protection for any species since taking office in January 2025.
