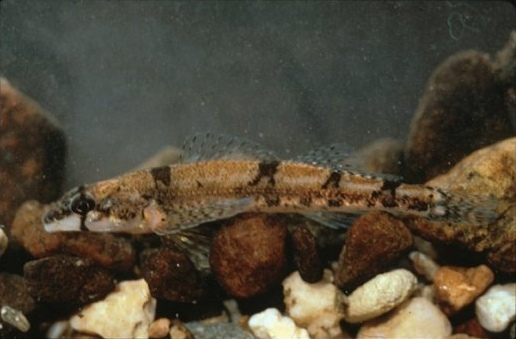

Conservation status
- Endangered (IUCN 3.1)

Scientific classification
- Kingdom: Animalia
- Phylum: Chordata
- Class: Actinopterygii
- Division: Teleostei
- Order: Perciformes
- Family: Percidae
- Genus: Percina
- Species: P. antesella

Binomial name
- Percina antesella J. D. Williams & Etnier, 1977

= Amber darter =

Species of fish

The amber darter (Percina antesella) is a small, endangered species of freshwater ray-finned fish, a darter from the subfamily Etheostomatinae, part of the family Percidae, which also contains the perches, ruffes and pikeperches. It is native to the Conasauga River and Etowah River in Georgia and Tennessee in the United States. It typically inhabits riffle areas over gravel and sand bottoms, hiding in aquatic vegetation when present. It feeds on small invertebrates and probably breeds between late fall and early spring. It is an uncommon fish with a small range and the International Union for Conservation of Nature has classified its conservation status as being "endangered".

== Description ==
The amber darter is typically less than 2.5 in (6.4 cm) in length and has a slender body. It has dark saddle-like markings on its golden brown upper body while the belly is a yellow-to-cream color. Breeding males have blue throats.

== Ecology ==
While there is little data available about the breeding habits of the amber darter, what information is available suggests that it spawns from late fall to early spring. The amber darter likely lives up to 3 years.

The amber darter inhabits the Coosa River system, living in the Conasauga and Etowah rivers of northern Georgia and southeastern Tennessee. In these rivers, it prefers to inhabit riffle areas over gravel substrate and sand. During the summer, when aquatic vegetation grows in the rivers, the amber darter feeds in the vegetation and uses it for cover. The amber darter preys mainly on gastropods, such as limpets and Snails, and aquatic insects.

== Status ==
A proposed reservoir may put the survival of the amber darter at risk by altering water and habitat quality in the amber darter's downstream habitat. Because of the amber darter's limited distribution, practically any activity that could degrade habitat or water quality, such as logging, chemical spills, or construction could threaten the existence of the amber darter. Conservation efforts focus on habitat preservation. It is an uncommon fish with a small range and the International Union for Conservation of Nature has classified its conservation status as being "endangered".
