= Longnose darter =

Conservation status
- Least Concern (IUCN 3.1)

Scientific classification
- Kingdom: Animalia
- Phylum: Chordata
- Class: Actinopterygii
- Order: Perciformes
- Family: Percidae
- Genus: Percina
- Species: P. nasuta

Binomial name
- Percina nasuta (Bailey, 1941)

Synonyms
- Hadropterus nasutus Bailey, 1941

Species of fish

The longnose darter (Percina nasuta) is a species of freshwater ray-finned fish, a darter from the subfamily Etheostomatinae, part of the family Percidae, which also contains the perches, ruffes and pikeperches. It is endemic to the United States.

== Appearance & Autonomy ==
The longnose darter is mostly yellow with a stripe of dark blotches down the lateral line. It has a bright yellow stripe on a mostly translucent first dorsal fin, and a block spot at the center of the base of the caudal fin. The rays of the second dorsal fin and the caudal fin are black and yellow striped like the color pattern along the lateral line. This fish can be characterized by a long, pointed snout that can be darker colored than the rest of its body and has been recorded to reach lengths of up to 11 cm.

== Distribution ==
Longnose darters are known to occur in thirteen different streams in three river systems across the southern Missouri Ozarks and the Ouachita mountains in Arkansas and eastern Oklahoma. Populations are sporadic and occur in small pockets in these streams and seem to only dwell in upland environments.

== Habitat & Life History ==
These darters are endemic to upland streams and prefer riffles and pools with clean gravel and boulders to spawn and inhabits the slower pools over sand and silt in the fall. Like most darters, they spawn in clean, silt free crevices and males guard the nest until eggs are hatched.

== Diet ==
Not much is known about diet, but it is speculated that adults consume macro-invertebrates.

== Threats ==
Like any species that requires clean, rocky substrate, the longnose darter is susceptible to siltation. Runoff is also an issue, as fertilizers and other chemicals have the potential to change the pH or dissolved oxygen levels in the water. The construction of dams and reservoirs are likely to have contributed to the isolation of the different populations. This species has been proposed to be listed as Near Threatened by Warren et al. (2000) because of how fragmented the populations are, but the IUCN lists them as a species of Least Concern. Longnose darters are listed as endangered in the state of Oklahoma and are considered the state's rarest fish.

== Sources ==
- Holley, C. T., Long J. M. 2018. Potential Longnose Darter Population in the Kiamichi River of Oklahoma. ResearchGate. (Accessed July 2, 2019)
- NatureServe. 2019. NatureServe Explorer: An online encyclopedia of life [web application]. Version 7.1. NatureServe, Arlington, Virginia. Available http://explorer.natureserve.org. (Accessed: June 23, 2019 ).
- Warren et al. 2000. Diversity, Distribution, and Conservation Status of the Native Freshwater Fishes of the Southern United States. United States Forest Service, Southern Research Station. (Accessed July 2, 2019).
