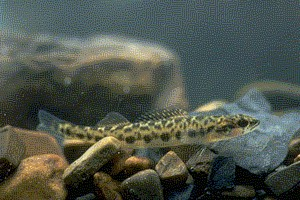

Conservation status
- Endangered (IUCN 3.1)

Scientific classification
- Kingdom: Animalia
- Phylum: Chordata
- Class: Actinopterygii
- Order: Perciformes
- Family: Percidae
- Genus: Percina
- Species: P. pantherina

Binomial name
- Percina pantherina (Moore and Reeves, 1955)

Synonyms
- Hadropterus pantherinus Moore & Reeves, 1955

= Leopard darter =

Species of fish

The leopard darter (Percina pantherina) is a species of freshwater ray-finned fish, a darter from the subfamily Etheostomatinae, part of the family Percidae, which also contains the perches, ruffes and pikeperches. It is native to the United States, where it can be found only in the Little River drainage in Oklahoma and Arkansas. Its typical habitat is medium to large streams with rubble and boulder substrate. It feeds on small invertebrates on the riverbed and spawns mainly in March and April. It is threatened by impoundment, habitat loss and runoff from agricultural activities. It has never been a common species and has been listed as a threatened species in the United States since 1978, and the International Union for Conservation of Nature lists it as a "vulnerable species".

== Description ==
Leopard darters rarely exceed three inches (8 cm) in length. They have 11–14 large, dark spots on their sides. These spots contrast against a light background that ranges from pale olive on the back to yellowish-olive on the underside. The back of the fish has numerous saddles and bars.

== Ecology ==
Leopard darters typically live less than two years, but individuals older than three years have been found. Spawning occurs in March and April, but may occur as early as February, on gravel-bottomed riffles. The fertilised eggs are buried in gravel. The average clutch size is about 65 eggs. Young leopard darters begin to appear in May of each year. Food items include aquatic insects and microcrustaceans. Leopard darters are found in medium to large streams. Typically, they are not found in smaller, headwater streams. From May to February, leopard darters prefer small, noisy pools with a rubble and boulder substrate. Spawning occurs on gravel substrates; however, the dominant riffle substrate may be gravel, rubble, boulder, and bedrock.

== Distribution ==
Historically, the leopard darter was limited to upland, large stream habitats of the Little River drainage in Oklahoma and Arkansas. Currently, scattered populations are found within its historic range. In Oklahoma, it occurs within the Little River drainage (Mountain Fork, Glover, and Little Rivers) in LeFlore, McCurtain, and Pushmataha Counties. In Arkansas, the leopard darter occurs in the Cossatot, Robinson Fork, and Mountain Fork Rivers in Howard, Polk, and Sevier Counties.

== Status ==
Leopard darters have likely never been common. The greatest threat to the survival of the species is the loss of habitat due to the construction of reservoirs. These impoundments also isolate populations, which further endangers the species. Logging activity, agricultural and industrial runoff, and gravel removal all pose threats as well.
