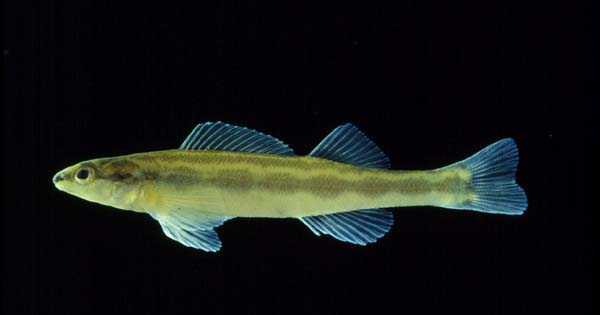

Conservation status
- Vulnerable (IUCN 3.1)

Scientific classification
- Kingdom: Animalia
- Phylum: Chordata
- Class: Actinopterygii
- Order: Perciformes
- Family: Percidae
- Genus: Percina
- Species: P. aurolineata

Binomial name
- Percina aurolineata Suttkus & Ramsey, 1967

= Goldline darter =

Species of fish

The goldline darter (Percina aurolineata) is a small species of freshwater ray-finned fish, a darter from the subfamily Etheostomatinae, part of the family Percidae, which also contains the perches, ruffes and pikeperches. It is found in the United States, primarily in the Cahaba River in central Alabama and the Coosa River in Georgia and Alabama. It is a small fish seldom exceeding 3 in (7.6 cm) in length. It is typically found in areas with moderate to swift currents and a water depth of over 2 ft (60 cm), in the main channels of free-flowing rivers with a rock, cobble or boulder base and aquatic plants. It has been federally listed as a threatened species since April 22, 1992, and the International Union for Conservation of Nature has classified its conservation status as being "vulnerable".

== Description ==
The fish is between 1.6 and 2.9 inches (41 and 74 mm) long with brownish red and amber dorsolateral stripes. Unlike other members of the Hadropterus subgenus, its back is a pale to dusky color. It has a white belly on which a series of square lateral and dorsal blotches can be seen. These blotches are separated by a pale or gold-colored stripe.

== Distribution and habitat ==
This fish is endemic to the Cahaba River system in central Alabama and the Coosa River system in Georgia and Alabama. There are two disjunct populations of goldline darters in the Alabama River Basin in addition to the population in the Mobile Basin. One of these groups occurs in the middle Cahaba River system, while the other is found in the Coosawattee River system, which is a tributary of the Coosa River.

This species prefers to live in areas with moderate to swift current and a water depth of over 2 feet (0.61 m) in the main channels of free-flowing rivers. These areas where it is most common have a bottom of bedrock, cobble, or small boulders and contain patches of water willow or other river weed. As in other Hadropterus subgenus members, the goldline darter spawns beginning in March and continues spawning through May or June.

== Status ==
The goldline darter is threatened due to water quality degradation on the Cahaba River. Strip mining activities, urbanization, and sewage pollution have exterminated populations. The building of reservoirs has also led to the fragmentation and isolation of some populations of goldline darters. Attempts to raise the population of the goldline darter will focus on habitat preservation and water quality improvement. The main decrease in population density is in the Little Cahaba River population. The International Union for Conservation of Nature has classified its conservation status as being "vulnerable" because of the relatively small population of this fish and the ongoing habitat degradation.
