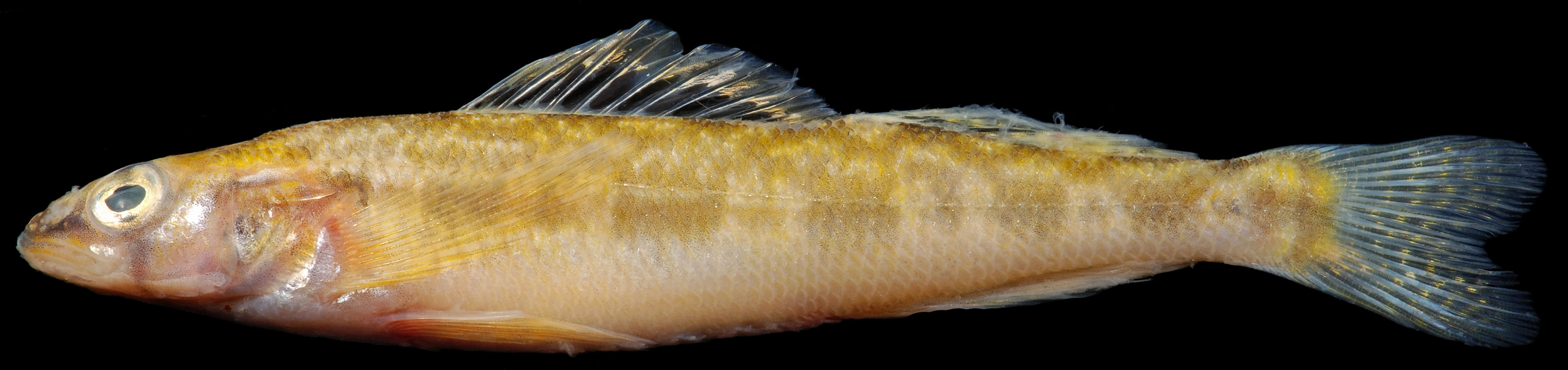

Conservation status
- Least Concern (IUCN 3.1)

Scientific classification
- Kingdom: Animalia
- Phylum: Chordata
- Class: Actinopterygii
- Order: Perciformes
- Family: Percidae
- Genus: Percina
- Species: P. nevisense

Binomial name
- Percina nevisense (Cope, 1870)

Synonyms
- Etheostoma nevisense Cope, 1870

= Chainback darter =

Species of fish

The chainback darter (Percina nevisense) is a species of freshwater ray-finned fish, a darter from the subfamily Etheostomatinae, part of the family Percidae, which also contains the perches, ruffes and pikeperches. It is found in North America where it occurs in the Roanoke-Chowan river drainage in Virginia south to the Neuse River drainage in North Carolina. It prefers gravel runs and riffles of small to medium-sized rivers.
