= Piedmont darter =

Conservation status
- Least Concern (IUCN 3.1)

Scientific classification
- Kingdom: Animalia
- Phylum: Chordata
- Class: Actinopterygii
- Order: Perciformes
- Family: Percidae
- Genus: Percina
- Species: P. crassa

Binomial name
- Percina crassa (D.S. Jordan & Brayton, 1878)

Synonyms
- Alvordius crassus Jordan & Brayton, 1878

Species of fish

The Piedmont darter (Percina crassa) is a small species of freshwater ray-finned fish, a darter from the subfamily Etheostomatinae, part of the family Percidae, which also contains the perches, ruffes and pikeperches. It is found in eastern North America in the Cape Fear, Peedee, and Santee River drainages in Virginia, North Carolina, and South Carolina. It prefers gravel runs and riffles of small to medium-sized rivers.
