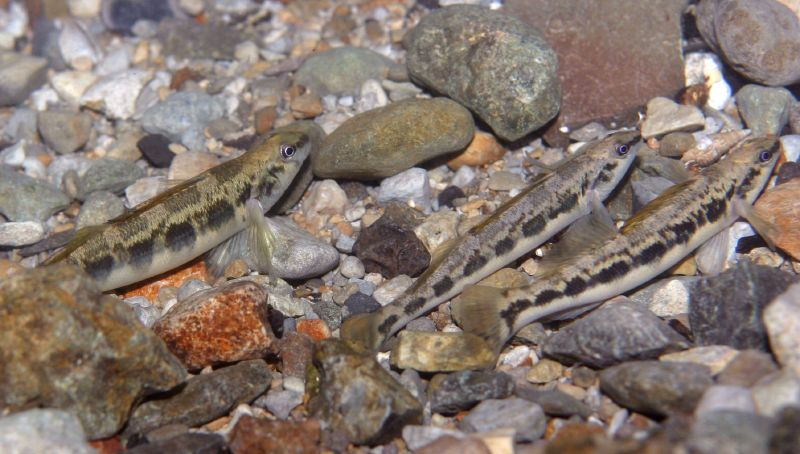

Conservation status
- Least Concern (IUCN 3.1)

Scientific classification
- Kingdom: Animalia
- Phylum: Chordata
- Class: Actinopterygii
- Order: Perciformes
- Family: Percidae
- Genus: Percina
- Species: P. apristis

Binomial name
- Percina apristis (C. L. Hubbs & Hubbs, 1954)

Synonyms
- Hadropterus scierus apristis Hubbs & Hubbs, 1954; Percina sciera apristis (Hubbs & Hubbs, 1954)

= Guadalupe darter =

Species of fish

The Guadalupe darter (Percina apristis) is a small species of freshwater ray-finned fish, a darter from the subfamily Etheostomatinae, part of the family Percidae, which also contains the perches, ruffes and pikeperches. It is found in the Guadalupe River system in Texas. The Guadalupe darter was formally a subspecies of the dusky darter, but was recognized as an independent species in 2007. It is protected by state law as a threatened species.

== Predators ==
The Guadalupe darter is typically predated upon by large birds and fish commonly including,

- Centrarchidae
- Heron
- Banded water snake
- Northern Cottonmouth
- Accipitridae

== Diet ==
The Guadalupe darter has a carnivorous diet that consist of small insects and arthropods including

- Red swamp crayfish
- Mayfly
- Mosquito
- Caddisfly
- Black fly
- Midge

== Habitat ==
The Guadalupe darter prefers fast rocky runs of small to medium-sized rivers. It can also be found scavenging in the Texas wild rice. It ranges from spring lake to the southern San Marcos river, which is a part of the greater Guadalupe river basin.

== Anatomy ==
The Guadalupe darter can reach up to 11 cm (4.3 in) in length. It is recognizable from its 6–8 black spots across the middle of its body. It has a tan upper half and a silver lower half. Unlike most ray-finned fishes, The Guadalupe darter does not contain a swim bladder. they move by scooting along the floor. The Guadalupe darter can live up to four years and reaches sexual maturity at one years old.
