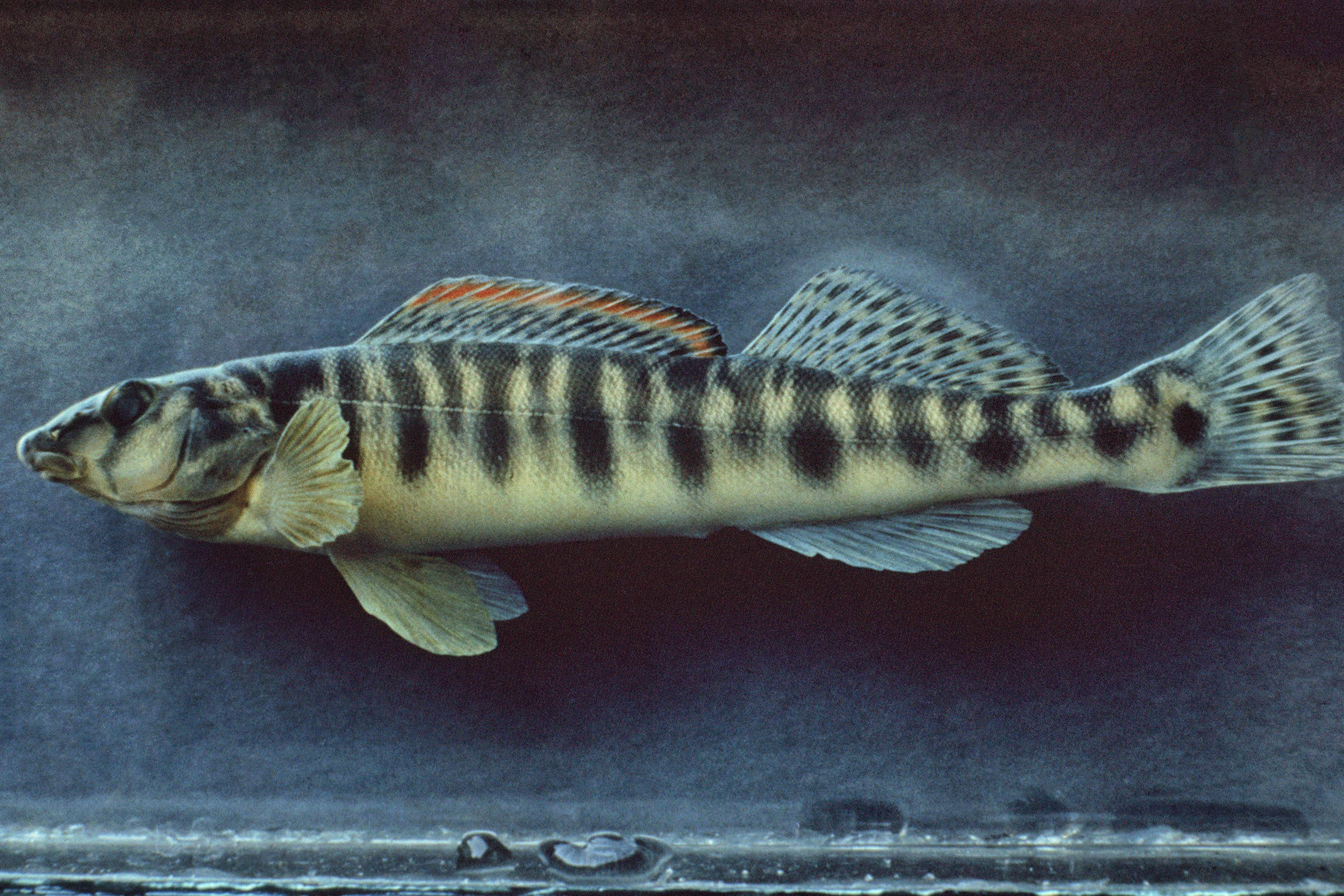

Conservation status
- Critically Endangered (IUCN 3.1)

- Endangered (ESA)

Scientific classification
- Kingdom: Animalia
- Phylum: Chordata
- Class: Actinopterygii
- Order: Perciformes
- Family: Percidae
- Genus: Percina
- Species: P. jenkinsi

Binomial name
- Percina jenkinsi B. A. Thompson, 1985

= Conasauga logperch =

Species of fish

The Conasauga logperch (Percina jenkinsi) is a species of freshwater ray-finned fish, a darter from the subfamily Etheostomatinae, part of the family Percidae, which also contains the perches, ruffes and pikeperches. It is endemic to the United States. It is one of 184 species of darters in North America. It has been listed as endangered throughout its range with critical habitat under the U.S. Endangered Species Act since August 5, 1985.

== Anatomy and appearance ==
This is a slender fish with a maximum length of 4.6 inches (12 cm). They are characterized by the presence of a conical, "pig-like" snout and "tiger-stripe" pattern of numerous dark, vertical bars on a yellowish background. The curious snout development is an apparent adaptation to stone-flipping behavior, in which the snout is used to flip over rocks during feeding. Unlike many other darter species, logperches show little sexual dimorphism in coloration.

== Geographic distribution ==
The Conasauga logperch is currently known only from an 11-mile reach of the Conasauga River, a Coosa River tributary in northern Georgia and south-central Tennessee. Thompson (1985) hypothesized jenkinsi to be derived from Percina caprodes, which entered the Conasauga system from the adjacent Hiwassee system of the Tennessee drainage. Specifically, it exists in the Conasauga River from the confluence of Half-way Branch with the Conasauga River in Polk County, Tennessee, downstream approximately 11 miles through Bradley County, Tennessee, to the Georgia State Highway 2 bridge in Murray County, Georgia.

== Ecology ==
Logperch feed on a variety of invertebrates. This species feeds on aquatic invertebrates found under stones. It is known to flip over substrate and prey on disturbed invertebrates. The procedure of flipping substrate makes available to them a wide range of organisms including larvae of midges, mayflies, caddisflies, riffle beetles, stoneflies, limpets, and fish eggs. Young feed on microcrustaceans. It is most likely that introduced rainbow trout (Oncorhynchus mykiss) and brown trout (Salmo trutta) are the main predators for this species. Sexual maturity is reached after one year and spawning occurs in spring, in fast riffles over gravel substrate. The fish has a maximum life span of at least four years. Logperch are in a clade of darters that exhibit little ecological variation among species. Males are nonterritorial and several may follow a single female until breeding takes place. The parents bury the fertilized eggs in the substrate. Exposed eggs are usually eaten by other males. Eggs are adhesive and demersal (heavier than water) thus allowing them to remain in the substrate. Hatching requires 200 hours. Clutch size is not documented and varies greatly in the genus Percina; fecundity of Percina caprodes females is high, ranging from 1,000 to 3,000 ova per year, while Percina evides females have been observed with a fecundity of only about 130 to 400 ova per year.

== Etymology ==
The Conasauga logperch was first formally described in 1985 by the American ichthyologist Dr. Bruce A. Thompson (1946–2007) and its specific name honors Thompson's fellow ichthyologist Robert E. Jenkins of Roanoke College.

== Current management ==
Percina jenkinsi has been federally listed as endangered throughout its range with critical habitat on August 5, 1986. A recovery plan was completed on June 20, 1986. At their Knoxville nonprofit, Conservation Fisheries, INC. (CFI) J.R. Shutes and Pat Rakes are trying to keep this rare species alive. The Conasauga River might hold a limited 200 individuals of this species and CFI holds three, the only ones in captivity. The goal is to have seed stock ready to restore the fish to the river, if and when society restores that river to its clean, free-flowing state. The Tennessee Aquarium in Chattanooga, and other private facilities, and state and federal wildlife agencies have efforts under way as well. The Southeastern Fishes Council put together a list they call the Desperate Dozen, "the twelve fish most likely to become extinct soon," and this list includes Percina jenkinsi. Current management includes preserving the Conasauga river populations and presently used habitat, utilize existing legislation of the Federal Endangered Species Act for water quality regulations, stream alteration regulations, etc., conduct life history research on the species to include reproduction, food habits, age and growth, and mortality factors, determine the number of individuals required to maintain a viable population, and searching for additional populations and habitats suitable for reintroduction efforts. The Forest Service is playing a lead role in conservation efforts in the upper watershed. The Conasauga River Alliance—a partnership of local citizens, businesses, conservation groups, and government agencies—is coordinating conservation activities in the middle section of the watershed. Both are active and assist each other throughout these parts of the watershed. Other partnerships include U.S. Fish and Wildlife Service, NC State University, Regional Solid Waste Management Authority, local industries and utility companies, Georgia DNR, private and public landowners, volunteers, and local city and county governments.
