= Frecklebelly darter =

Conservation status
- Least Concern (IUCN 3.1)

Scientific classification
- Kingdom: Animalia
- Phylum: Chordata
- Class: Actinopterygii
- Order: Perciformes
- Family: Percidae
- Genus: Percina
- Species: P. stictogaster

Binomial name
- Percina stictogaster Burr & Page, 1993

Species of fish

The frecklebelly darter (Percina stictogaster) is a species of freshwater ray-finned fish, a darter from the subfamily Etheostomatinae, part of the family Percidae, which also contains the perches, ruffes and pikeperches. It primarily occurs in the upper Kentucky and Green river systems of eastern and central Kentucky and north-central Tennessee, being found mostly in the Cumberland Plateau and Highland Rim regions. The fish gets its name from gets its name from the scattered dark spots on its relatively pale underside. However, a possible more telling characteristic of the species is the systematical arrangement of the spots at the base of the tail as well as the continuous stripes down either side of the back. Total population size is unknown but figured to be relatively large. The frecklebelly darter is a benthic darter that relies on invertebrates as its principal diet. The frecklebelly darter can be found primarily in creeks and small rivers with a moderate gradient and a pool/riffle type flow, and spends most of its time in midwater areas of the stream. The major threats of the frecklebelly darter include decimation through perturbations such as strip mining as well as stream channelization projects. The darter is thought to have a high resilience with minimum population doubling time less than 15 months; it is also believed to have low vulnerability. Frecklebelly darter females contain about 100–300 mature ova depending on size. Fish become mature by age 1. Spawning in this darter species involves egg burial where the male mounts the female and deposits eggs in deep depressions created by receptive females.

== Geographic distribution ==
The frecklebelly darter has a rather small distribution. Found in only two states, Tennessee and Kentucky, the species is endemic to higher elevation streams and reservoirs. found primarily in the Upper Kentucky and upper Green (including Barren River) river systems in eastern and central Kentucky and north-central Tennessee. The darter propagates upland streams of the Cumberland Plateau and central portions of the Highland Rim. Fairly common in Kentucky River drainage (where occurs from Red River upstream and including the South Fork), the darter is uncommon and localized in the Green River drainage. In the Green River, the frecklebelly darter occurs primarily upstream of the confluence of the Little Barren and Green rivers. In the Barren River, it is most common upstream of the confluence of Drakes Creek and the Barren River. The frecklebelly darter is restricted to large tributaries in Tennessee, primarily of the Barren River system in Clay, Macon, and Sumner counties. There is an old record from the Nolin River system, where the species no longer occurs. The frecklebelly darter as well as most other darter species in the area are vulnerable to decimation through perturbations such as strip mining; stream channelization projects threaten available habitat in Tennessee. It is believed that these factors as well as the damming of natural river systems may have extirpated the species from other areas in the southeast. Non-native Invasive fish species could also be a cause of limited distribution.

== Ecology ==
The frecklebelly darter is a benthic fish which inhabits quiet water areas, especially flowing pools, backwater pools, and vegetated riffle margins of clear creeks and small to medium rivers (usually stream orders 3–5). The darter most often swims in midwater than near bottom. Oftentimes it can be found resting on submerged mats of tree roots along bank. In winter the fish may be found in accumulations of dead leaves. Spawning of the species evidently peaks from mid-March through mid- April. The fish is estimated to live about 3 years. The frecklebelly darter does not show any time of migration. The darter feeds on invertebrates which include river snails, hydropsychid caddisfly larvae, midge larvae, and small mayfly nymphs such as baetids. This fish is likely a prey item for almost any piscivorous fish that occur within the darter's range, such as Largemouth Bass, Smallmouth Bass, and other large piscivores. Fish with similar habitat requirements are the greatest competitors to the fish. It seems that this particular species desires cooler water temperatures that come with higher elevations. Many of the regions where the fish exist are suspect to mining operations as well as river damming. Either of these projects could very well be detrimental to the fish species.

== Life history ==
The frecklebelly darter has a poorly studied life history. Spawning of the species evidently peaks from mid-March through mid-April. The fish is estimated to live about three years. Based on length frequency data this species is reproductively mature at age one. Spawning occurs in temperatures of 7 to 16 °C (45 to 61 °F) in areas with strong current and fine gravel. Aquarium observations confirm that this species buries its eggs in a manner similar to other Percina darters. Fertilized eggs are about 2.5 mm in diameter, clear, demersal and slightly adhesive. At 10 °C (50 °F) eggs hatched in 18–25 days. Females of the species are thought to reach sexual maturity at age one and when spawning, lay their eggs in the substrate of the lake or river bed. Males of the species have a semicircular keel on the caudal peduncle that appears to function as a ploughshare which, in conjunction with the long anal fin, delivers spermatozoa to be buried in the substrate. Compared to sympatric darters, early spawning results in relatively large young, which may reduce predation in this relatively pelagic species.

== Current management ==
Like many non-game species, little is known about the frecklebelly darter. The darter is state listed as being in need of management categorized as critically imperiled.
