= Bronze darter =

Conservation status
- Least Concern (IUCN 3.1)

Scientific classification
- Kingdom: Animalia
- Phylum: Chordata
- Class: Actinopterygii
- Order: Perciformes
- Family: Percidae
- Genus: Percina
- Species: P. palmaris

Binomial name
- Percina palmaris (Bailey, 1940)

Synonyms
- Hadropterus palmaris Bailey, 1940

Species of fish

The bronze darter (Percina palmaris) is a species of freshwater ray-finned fish, a darter from the subfamily Etheostomatinae, part of the family Percidae, which also contains the perches, ruffes and pikeperches. It is restricted to the Coosa and Tallapoosa River systems in Georgia, Alabama, and southeastern Tennessee in the United States. It feeds on insect larvae and other small invertebrates, and spawns in April and May. It is a common fish within its range and the International Union for Conservation of Nature has classified its conservation status as being of "least concern". However, it is susceptible to environmental disturbance and an ongoing management plan has been put in place to protect its habitat.

== Description ==
The bronze darter is a relatively small fish reaching lengths up to 3.9 inches; pigmentation from the cells allows a distinctive bronze coloration to radiate from the fish's body. The bronze pigmentation is expressed more vividly in males during breeding season.

== Distribution ==
The geographic range of the bronze darter is restricted to the Mobile Bay drainage. Populations of bronze darters are located only in Coosa and Tallapoosa River systems in Georgia, Alabama, and southeastern Tennessee, United States of America. These locations make up Mobile Bay. Geographical range restrictions of the bronze darter potentially impair the ability of the species to recover from anthropogenic or naturally threatening phenomenon. Currently, there are no reports of the bronze darter being found outside the aforementioned locations. The bronze darter still occupies native range; however, potential issues can arise from dams in the Mobile Bay. Dams can affect the bronze darter population due to manipulation of water flow. Today, the species is categorized as stable due to the fact that populations are abundant and have been historically. Possible population stressors from urbanization could cause extirpation from the native range, and possible extinction would occur in the species.

== Ecology ==
The bronze darter thrives in freshwater and consistently stays in swift waters up to thirty centimeters in depth with partial weedy cover. The substrate in the darter's habitat consists of granulated sand to small gravel covering the bottom of the water bed. This substrate creates an excellent reservoir for darters to collect food sources in order to maintain life. The darter species are diurnal sight feeders, activity peaking at sunrise and sunset. Over half of their diet consists mainly of chironomids, i.e., water insects. This food source is needed in higher concentrations during the reproductive season. Populations of the bronze darter are stable with no sudden threat from anthropogenic and biological factors. Biological threats to darters include large game fish e.g., Micropterus salmoides (large mouth bass) and crayfish which reluctantly prey on the darters. Anthropogenic concerns to the populations have arisen from impoundment of water and hydropower production. Creating possible threats that can lead to population declines.

== Life history ==
Darters have a specific reproductive physiology for breeding in order to meet sustainable populations. Darters use the substrate in their water beds as coverage to protect spawned eggs during the reproduction period. Percina family reaches a larger size, live longer, spawn more, and produce more mature eggs than Etheostoma family. Both male and female mature at one year of age reaching lengths of up to 3.9 inches (99 mm) long. The bronze darter life spawn can average from three to four years of age, creating opportunity for multiple reproductive seasons. Once reaching maturity, females will begin to strip (release) eggs in order to start the process of reproduction. This initial phase begins on April 9 and goes through May 6 during required water temperatures averaging seventeen °C (63 °F). Males begin to produce milt early in mid-February when temperature requirements of eight degrees Celsius are obtained. Once requirements are met, spawning begins early May and goes through June. On average thirty five mature ova are produced yearly. The bronze darter has a special ability to spawn up to three times during one reproductive season. Urbanization is a constant threat to the reproductive cycle and life history of the bronze darter. In the Tallapoosa River current land-use practices are negatively impacting stream water quality with pesticides, erosion, and waste run off.

== Current management ==
The bronze darter population is sustainable and stable with current management plans provided by the Tennessee Wildlife Resource Agency. Current plans and initiatives are indirectly focused on supporting the bronze darter. With this species categorized as having sustainable populations, there are no specific plans in place to prevent species extinction. Human impact on the native range of the bronze darter is the main obstacle that managers have to continuously assess. Currently, human development around the Mobile Bay drainage is stressing populations for available habitat space, not to mention the quality of the living range. Habitat destruction is always a lingering concern with development and urbanization in the twenty-first century. Water quality is threatened by pollution and environment erosion which originates from privately owned lands. Managers and stakeholders currently have an ongoing operation checking on-site septic tanks, thus monitoring the impact of changing land use on water quality. Agencies managing over the range of the bronze darter collect data to monitor the effects and create and promote legislation to protect and enforce conservation efforts that might be needed in the future to protect the bronze darter population. Some researchers speculate that current management programs are not strict enough in preventing risk to the bronze darter. E.R. Irwin and M.C. Freeman, authors in Conservation Biology, advocate for developing and agreeing to a management plan that establishes better dam interval timing and understanding the broader scope and impact of the current management plan on the bronze darter. Wildlife managers and scientist can learn from historical and current management plans and expand programs to promote more conservation.
