= Freckled darter =

Conservation status
- Near Threatened (IUCN 3.1)

Scientific classification
- Kingdom: Animalia
- Phylum: Chordata
- Class: Actinopterygii
- Order: Perciformes
- Family: Percidae
- Genus: Percina
- Species: P. lenticula

Binomial name
- Percina lenticula Richards & L. W. Knapp, 1964

Species of fish

The freckled darter (Percina lenticula) is a species of freshwater ray-finned fish, a darter from the subfamily Etheostomatinae, part of the family Percidae, which also contains the perches, ruffes and pikeperches. It is endemic to the United States.

== Geographic distribution ==
They are found in the drainage systems of the Mobile Bay, Pascagoula, and Pearl Rivers in Georgia, Alabama, Mississippi and Louisiana.
