= Muscadine darter =

Conservation status
- Near Threatened (IUCN 3.1)

Scientific classification
- Kingdom: Animalia
- Phylum: Chordata
- Class: Actinopterygii
- Order: Perciformes
- Family: Percidae
- Genus: Percina
- Species: P. smithvanizi

Binomial name
- Percina smithvanizi J. D. Williams & Walsh, 2007

Species of fish

The muscadine darter (Percina smithvanizi) is a small freshwater species of freshwater ray-finned fish, a darter from the subfamily Etheostomatinae, part of the family Percidae, which also contains the perches, ruffes and pikeperches. It is found in streams above the Fall Line in the Tallapoosa River system in eastern Alabama and western Georgia. It prefers gravel runs and riffles of small to medium-sized rivers. The specific name honors the American ichthyologist William F. Smith-Vaniz for his contributions to ichthyology and for the writing the first book on the Freshwater Fishes of Alabama.
