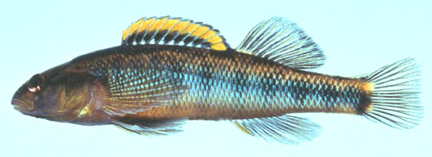

Conservation status
- Least Concern (IUCN 3.1)

Scientific classification
- Kingdom: Animalia
- Phylum: Chordata
- Class: Actinopterygii
- Order: Perciformes
- Family: Percidae
- Genus: Percina
- Species: P. roanoka

Binomial name
- Percina roanoka (Jordan & Jenkins, 1889)

Synonyms
- Etheostoma roanoka Jordan & Jenkins, 1889

= Percina roanoka =

Species of fish

Percina roanoka, the Roanoke darter, is a species of freshwater ray-finned fish, a darter from the subfamily Etheostomatinae, part of the family Percidae, which also contains the perches, ruffes and pikeperches. It is native to Virginia and North Carolina in the United States and is present in West Virginia, possibly from introduction. It is found in the Roanoke, Tar, and Neuse river systems, typically in small to medium size rivers. It is a colorful species with an average length of 4.3 centimeters (1.7 in). It feeds on insect larvae and other small invertebrates, and spawns in late May and June. It is a common fish with a very wide range and the International Union for Conservation of Nature has classified its conservation status as being of "least concern".

== Description ==
Breeding males have black heads and red or orange jaws. They have black spinal fins with orange bands. Their anal, pelvic and pectoral fins are white with transparent membranes. They have sides whose coloration ranges from dark brown to back, with blue, yellow or green highlights. Females and nonbreeding males are colored similarly, although their colors are less intense than those of breeding males.

The darter has from nine to twelve dorsal fin spines, seven to nine anal fins and nine to twelve dorsal fin rays. The darter has an average length of 4.3 centimeters (1.7 in), although the maximum reported length of a specimen of P. roanoka is 7.8 cm (3.1 in). The darter has a maximum life span of three years.

== Distribution and habitat ==
The darter lives in the drainage basin of the Roanoke, Tar, and Neuse rivers in Virginia and North Carolina. It is also found in the northern sections of the James River in Virginia and the New River in West Virginia and Virginia, to the latter of which it may have been introduced.

The darter prefers to live in small to medium-sized rivers. Adults and juvenile Percina roanoka tend to live in streams and riffles with gravel level substrate. Younger juveniles tend to live in pools near the riffles.

== Behavior ==
The darter spawns from late May to late June. In the New River, the darter has been observed reproducing with the sharpnose darter (Percina oxyrhynchus) to produce hybrids.

The darter is a carnivore. It primarily consumes chironomids, mayflies and black flies.

== Conservation status ==
The darter is ranked as least-concern by the International Union for Conservation of Nature. Reasons for this ranking include the darter's large habitat range, stable population size, large number of sub-populations and lack of major threats to its survival.
