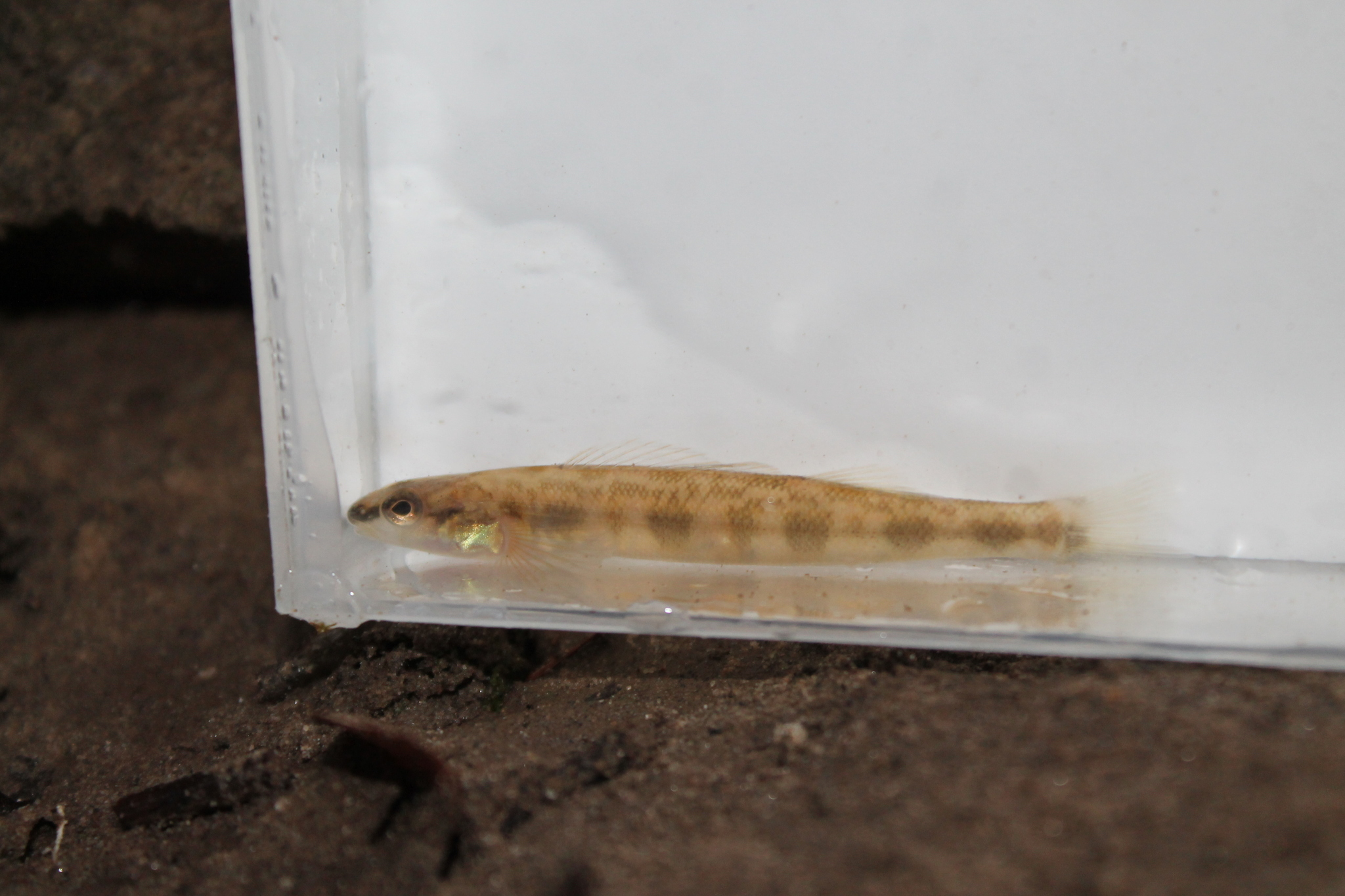

Conservation status
- Vulnerable (IUCN 3.1)

Scientific classification
- Kingdom: Animalia
- Phylum: Chordata
- Class: Actinopterygii
- Order: Perciformes
- Family: Percidae
- Genus: Percina
- Species: P. sipsi

Binomial name
- Percina sipsi J. D. Williams & Neely, 2007

= Bankhead darter =

Species of fish

The Bankhead darter (Percina sipsi) is a benthic species of freshwater ray-finned fish, a darter from the subfamily Etheostomatinae, part of the family Percidae, which also contains the perches, ruffes and pikeperches. It is found in North America where it occurs in the Sipsey Fork of the Black Warrior River in the Bankhead National Forest in northwestern Alabama. It prefers gravel runs and riffles of small to medium-sized rivers.
