= Percina macrocephala =

Longhead darter

Conservation status
- Data Deficient (IUCN 3.1)

Scientific classification
- Kingdom: Animalia
- Phylum: Chordata
- Class: Actinopterygii
- Order: Perciformes
- Family: Percidae
- Genus: Percina
- Species: P. macrocephala

Binomial name
- Percina macrocephala (Cope, 1867)

Synonyms
- Etheostoma macrocephalum Cope, 1867

Species of fish

Percina macrocephala, also known commonly as the longhead darter, is a species of freshwater ray-finned fish, a darter in the subfamily Etheostomatinae, part of the family Percidae, which also contains the perches, ruffes, and pikeperches. P. macrocephala is endemic to the United States.

== Geographic range ==
P. macrocephala occurs in the basin of the Ohio River from New York and North Carolina west as far as western central Kentucky and Tennessee.

== Habitat ==
The preferred habitat of P. macrocephala is rocky pools with a strong flow, usually upstream or downstream from riffles with pebbles in clear, small to medium-sized rivers. It also inhabits creeks.

== Diet ==
P. macrocephala is carnivorous, and its food is mainly small crayfishes and mayfly nymphs.
