= Saddleback darter =

Conservation status
- Least Concern (IUCN 3.1)

Scientific classification
- Kingdom: Animalia
- Phylum: Chordata
- Class: Actinopterygii
- Division: Teleostei
- Order: Perciformes
- Family: Percidae
- Genus: Percina
- Species: P. vigil

Binomial name
- Percina vigil (O. P. Hay, 1882)

Synonyms
- Ioa vigil Hay, 1882; Etheostoma ouachitae Jordan & Gilbert, 1887; Percina ouachitae (Jordan & Gilbert, 1887)

Species of fish

The saddleback darter (Percina vigil) is a species of freshwater ray-finned fish, a darter from the subfamily Etheostomatinae, part of the family Percidae, which also contains the perches, ruffes and pikeperches. It is native to the eastern United States. This darter species is widespread, occurring from the Escambia River drainage west to the Mississippi River basin and as far north as the Wabash River historically. Some populations have been reported in the Tennessee River drainage. The saddleback darter is aptly named as it has 5 saddle-like patterns on its dorsum, with the first occurring near the first dorsal fin and the fifth near the caudal peduncle. Adults can attain a maximum size of about 3 inches or 7.8 centimeters. The saddleback darter typically occurs over sand and gravel runs of creeks and small to medium-sized rivers and is sometimes found in very shallow water. This darter's diet consists of invertebrates such as caddisfly larvae, beetles, mayflies, and stoneflies. The saddleback darter deposits eggs over sand and gravel shoals during the spring. This species has an average lifespan between 2 and 3 years.

== Geographic distribution ==
The saddleback darter has a widespread but sporadic distribution throughout its range. It commonly occurs in low gradient streams from the Mississippi River drainage in southeast Indiana and Missouri southward to the Gulf Slope in the Escambia River Drainage. This fish is most common in the Gulf Slope region of its range. The fish has also been recorded in the Tennessee River drainages such as the Hatchie River. The saddleback darter was once found in the Wabash River, however it has been extirpated. This raises interest as to what contributed to the extirpation of this darter. Anthropogenic factors, especially siltation and excess nutrients, are likely to blame for the loss of this fish from the river. The Wabash River flows through the Corn Belt, a major agricultural area of the United States. This puts the river at great risk for increased nutrients from fertilizers and siltation from frequent disturbance of the soil. This reduction in water quality has likely been what extirpated the saddleback darter from the watershed, along with several other fish species.

== Ecology ==
The saddleback darter typically inhabits large creeks and rivers, but is occasionally found in small streams as well. These fish are closely associated with shoal habitats where they prefer sand or gravel substrates. The saddleback darter is a lowland area darter occurring in temperate areas, thus the water temperature generally ranges from a low of 40 °F to a high of around 80 °F. The saddleback darter also co-occurs with the Snail Darter in the Lower Paint Rock River in Alabama. The saddleback darter feeds on invertebrates including river snails, hydropsychid caddisfly larvae, midge larvae, and small mayfly nymphs such as baetids. This fish is likely a prey item for almost any piscivorous fish that occur within the darter's range. Likely predators include Largemouth Bass, Smallmouth Bass, and other large piscivores. Human induced changes to the waterways they occur in could cause their decline in the future. Since they have an affinity for swift water such as that found in shoals, the creation of impoundments causes the loss of their particular microhabitat.

== Life History ==
The saddleback darter spawns over gravel shoals as early as late winter, though it can continue into April. Maximum tubercle development in males was documented to occur in February in an Alabama population. There is evidence to support the hypothesis that these fish may have more than a single clutch in a reproductive season. Clutches from females of 41–55mm consisted of anywhere from 40 to 400 eggs. Sexual maturity is reached within one year, and following this males are usually slightly larger than females of the same age class. The average lifespan of the saddleback darter is two years, with few specimens making it through their third winter. Reproduction is another aspect of the fish's status that could be negatively impacted by creating impoundments. Building dams to create lakes and hydroelectric power facilities causes a loss of shoal habitat needed for the saddleback darter to spawn.

== Management ==
The saddleback darter is listed by the IUCN as least concern, and there does not appear to be any specific monitoring plan for the species throughout its range. The populations of darters are generally poorly reported. The saddleback darter has been extirpated from the Wabash River section of its range.
