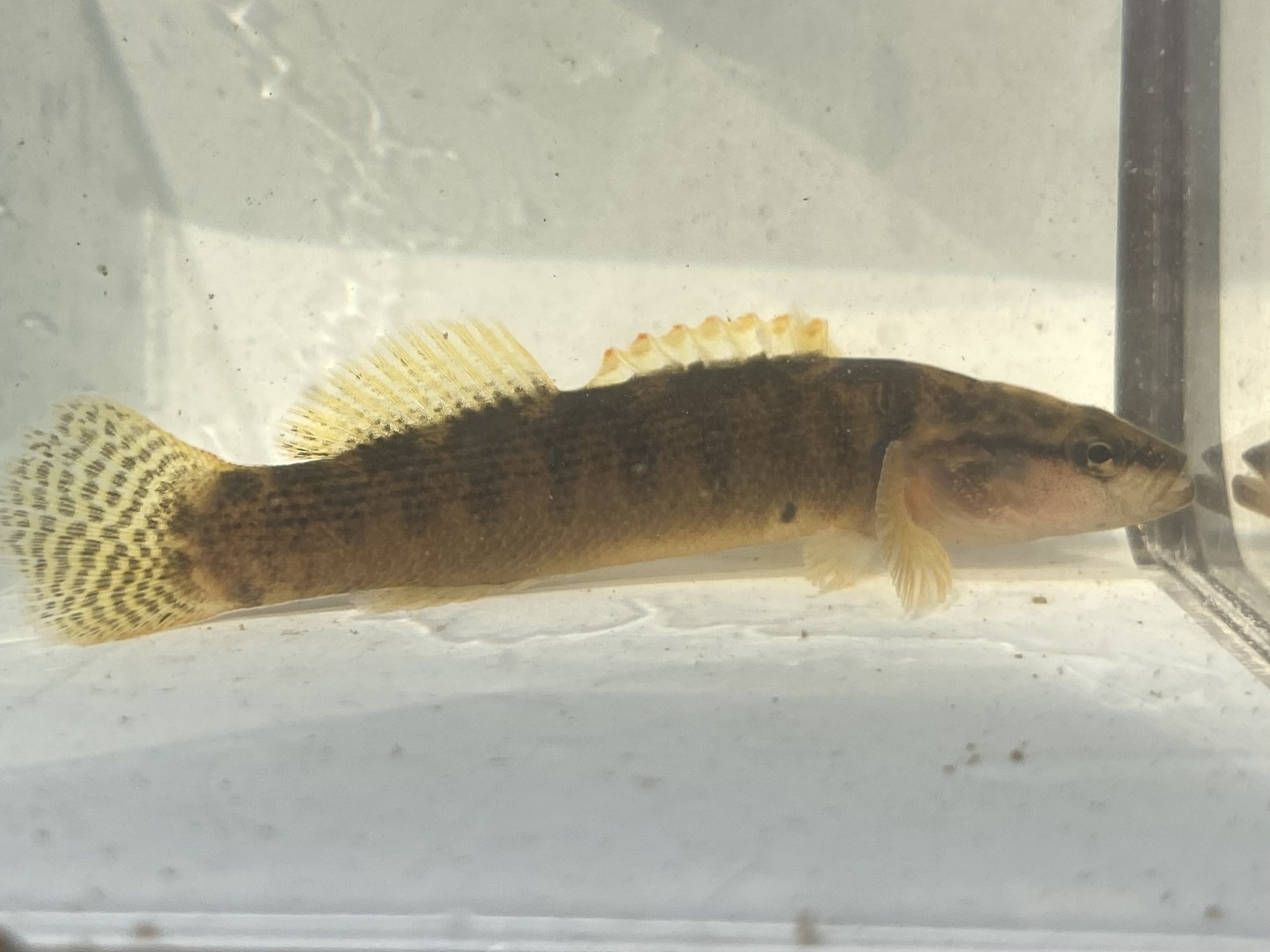

Conservation status
- Least Concern (IUCN 3.1)

Scientific classification
- Kingdom: Animalia
- Phylum: Chordata
- Class: Actinopterygii
- Order: Perciformes
- Family: Percidae
- Genus: Etheostoma
- Species: E. flabellare

Binomial name
- Etheostoma flabellare Rafinesque, 1819

Synonyms
- Catonotus flabellaris flabellaris (Rafinesque, 1819); Etheostoma flabellare flabellare Rafinesque, 1819; Catonotus lineolatus Agassiz, 1854; Etheostoma flabellare lineolatum (Agassiz, 1854)

= Fantail darter =

Species of fish

The fantail darter (Etheostoma flabellare) is a species of freshwater ray-finned fish, a darter from the subfamily Etheostomatinae, part of the family Percidae, which also contains the perches, ruffes and pikeperches. It is widely distributed across streams in North America.

== Description ==
The fantail darter is a small, slender fish, typically reaching lengths of 1.5 to 3 inches. Its coloration ranges from olive-brown to tan, often featuring dark horizontal stripes or "pencil lines" along its sides. The species is characterized by a small head and a terminal mouth. A defining feature of the males is the presence of fleshy, gold-colored knobs on the tips of the spines of the first dorsal fin, which are used to mimic eggs during the breeding season. The tail fin is rounded and often displays several dark vertical bars.

== Distribution and habitat ==
The fantail darter is distributed across much of eastern North America, from the Great Lakes and the Mississippi River basins to South Carolina and northern Alabama, in small streams. They can be found as far west as northeastern Oklahoma. These darters, like many others, live in smaller streams. Due to their breeding habits, they are found in areas of the stream with cobbles and flat stones. These fish are especially abundant near large slabs of limestone or shale. Partly because of their wide range of habitats, fantail darters have not been labelled as endangered.

It is well-adapted for stream life, and the environmental changes that occur in streams as the seasons change. Changes can include the loss of microhabitats, when the fish must drift downstream to find another, and also include changes in oxygen levels due to pollution or weather.

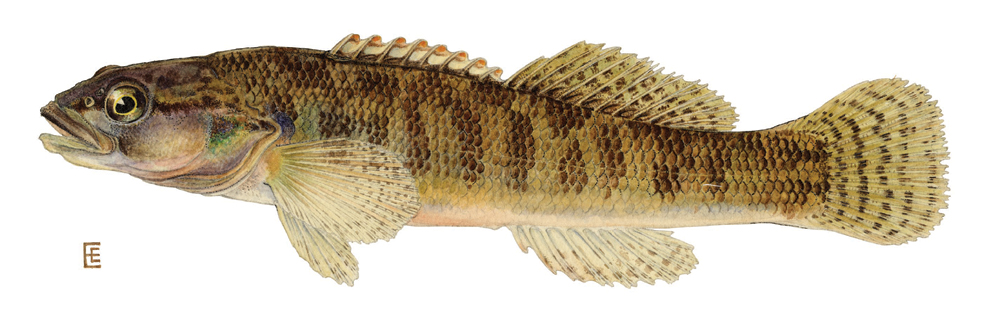
Male fantail darter

== Ecology ==
Similar to other darters, fantail darters have several predators. They are also well-colored for their habitats, and they blend in easily with the surrounding stream bed and rocks.

Depending on the size of the specific darter, they can eat anything from tiny insects to larger insects and larve. Their food sources can include mayflies, caddisflies, dipterans, copepods, cladocerans, amphipods, isopods, and gastropods. Food for the larger fantail darters can include the larger type of insects, including mayfly and midge larvae.

Fantail darters are primarily benthic invertivores, so inhabit shallow, high-velocity microhabitats of the streams - riffles. If the microhabitat is destroyed or all the resources are used up, the fantail darter will simply move to another, where more food can be found. During the summer months, the water temperatures of streams rise significantly, causing the water to have a lower oxygen level. Fantail darters have a good tolerance for this temperature change and low oxygen levels. With higher temperatures, water in the streams will evaporate quickly. The fantail darter has actually adapted to this, and is sometimes found to evacuate a drying riffle. Though the fantail darter has a fairly good low-oxygen tolerance, there comes a point when too little oxygen is harmful. Without oxygen in the water, the fish will die out eventually. Low oxygen levels can also be caused by pollution of the stream. Pollution can also kill off the small invertebrates the fantail darter consumes.

== Life history ==
The fish spawn in early summer, when water temperatures reach 17–20 °C. Other darters, such as the logperch and rainbow darters, spawn at least a month before the fantail darter, which apparently needs warmer temperature waters before it can spawn; the eggs also tend to be larger. Fantail darters have an interesting growth period in that they do not really have a larval stage; instead, they start to feed two to three days after hatching. By then, the medial fins are differentiated. They are born large, with well-developed heads, jaws, and teeth. When first hatched, the free embryos are benthic and rarely go into the water column. Fantail darters also have extensive and well-developed vitelline plexuses from the time they are very young, which allows them to feed on bigger prey quickly. This means that they have no need to drift farther down the stream to find small planktonic prey as early young.

As the darters grow and mature, they take on the characteristics of their sex. They mature and become of breeding age in one to two years, and usually do not live longer than four years. The males of this species have modified first dorsal fins that characteristically look like little bulbs. This is believed to be used for egg mimicry purposes. Females are proven to be more likely to spawn with a male that already has a clutch of eggs. This may have led to an evolutionary change of the specialized egg-mimicking morphology in males. Since the male already looks like he has eggs, the female will come under the rock where he has cleared a space, and will lay her eggs on the underside of the top rock; usually, several females add to each male's clutch, resulting in more diversity and offspring produced. Throughout the time of egg growth, the male will take care of the eggs, but he may eat some of them to keep up his energy. These nests can be easily disturbed, and the delicate eggs can be destroyed simply by a human walking through the stream, yet another potential risk in their lives.

Though the males guard the eggs, studies have shown they exhibit filial cannibalism, meaning they eat some of the eggs in their nest. A research study collecting data on the fantail darter found all the males are, in fact, cannibals. Some males will eat the entire nest of eggs, while others will eat only part of it.

== Systematics ==
The fantail darter was first formally described in 1819 by the French polymath Constantine Samuel Rafinesque (1783–1840). There are two recognised subspecies:

- Etheostoma flabellare flabellare Rafinesque, 1819 (Fantail darter) - the eastern part of the range as far west as lower Michigan and Indiana.
- Etheostome flabellare lineolatum (Agassiz, 1854) (Striped darter) - Minnesota, Wisconsin and upper Michigan.
