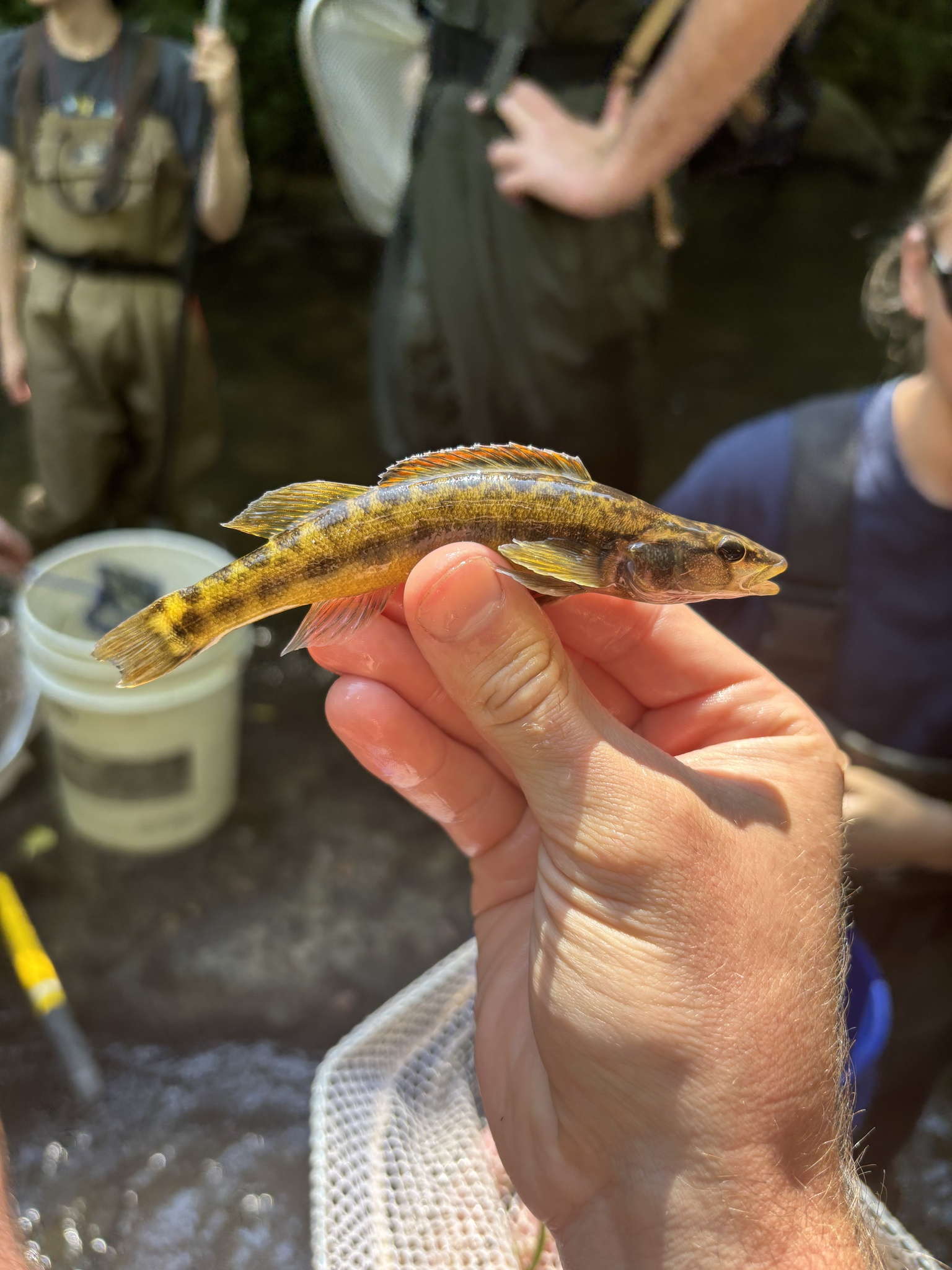

Conservation status
- Near Threatened (IUCN 3.1)

Scientific classification
- Kingdom: Animalia
- Phylum: Chordata
- Class: Actinopterygii
- Order: Perciformes
- Family: Percidae
- Genus: Percina
- Species: P. squamata

Binomial name
- Percina squamata (C. H. Gilbert & Swain, 1887)

Synonyms
- Etheostoma squamatum Gilbert & Swain, 1887

= Olive darter =

Species of fish

The olive darter (Percina squamata) is a species of freshwater ray-finned fish, a darter from the subfamily Etheostomatinae, part of the family Percidae, which also contains the perches, ruffes and pikeperches. It is native to Tennessee, Kentucky, North Carolina, and Georgia, in the United States. It is found in the headwaters of Tennessee River system and the middle reaches of the Cumberland River system, its ideal habitat being clear, cold water over rocky substrates. It grows to a length of about 5 in (13 cm) and is an insectivore, feeding mainly on insect larvae on the riverbed. The fish matures at age two and lives till about age four. Up to 1500 eggs are spawned which fall to the riverbed and get lodged among gravel. The olive darter is classified as a "vulnerable species", being affected by habitat destruction and siltation, often resulting from damming and impoundment of the rivers or the creation of weirs. It is also affected by the change in the forest riparian habitat resulting from the killing of trees by the hemlock woolly adelgid.

== Geographic distribution ==
Their geographic range is dispersed among headwaters of the Tennessee River system from the Holston River system (Watauga River) downstream as far as the Hiwassee River system, including the Emory River, in North Carolina, Tennessee, and Georgia; and the middle Cumberland River drainage below the falls, primarily in the Rockcastle River and Big South Fork, in Kentucky and Tennessee.

The olive darter is restricted to small to medium-sized streams and rivers in the upper-most portions of the Tennessee River and Cumberland River systems in Tennessee, Kentucky, North Carolina, and Georgia. In Georgia, Percina squamata is only known from the Toccoa and Little Tennessee River systems. Within the Cumberland and Tennessee River systems this species occurs in Big South Fork, Coopers Creek, Betty's Creek Rockcastle River, Holston River (Watauga River), Nolichucky River, and Hiawassee River. Percina squamata relies on good water quality and fast-water habitats in order to survive. The largest tributaries of the Toccoa and Nottely rivers in Georgia are very similar, having clear, cold water and rocky substrates, ideal conditions for the olive darter.

== Ecology ==
Olive darters are invertivores/insectivores primarily feeding on benthic aquatic insects, including caddisflies and mayflies. In general, darters feed opportunistically on immature insects; few taxa are consumed in greater proportions than they were found in the environment. This species of darter, like many others, inhabits high-gradient streams with moderate to torrential current over rubble and boulders, deeper downstream portions of gravel riffles in streams of moderate gradient, and sometimes shallow pools with gravel or rock bottoms. Being very habitat specific, it is necessary for humans to have as little influence on the streams that this species inhabits. Human activities, particularly habitat destruction and species introductions, are resulting in increased homogenization of once unique biogeographic regions. Failure of Best Management Practices (BMPs) for forestry and agriculture, failure to control soil erosion from construction sites and bridge crossings, and increased stormwater runoff from developing urban and industrial areas have degraded the stream quality and pose a significant threat to the olive darters. Runoff and siltation caused by increasing habitat destruction raises the temperature of the water in many streams causing a change in the microclimate needed for the inhabitants of olive darters. This leads to loss of population.

== Life history ==
The olive darter grows up to 5 inches in length and lives for up to 4 years. Female maturity is reached at 2 years old and they have a brood size of 1,500 in order to make up for the lack of a brood guarder. Eggs are dispersed out in the open and then fall down into rock-gravel.

The maximum lifespan of the olive darter is around four years with an average lifespan of three years. This darter reaches sexual maturity halfway through its life at two years. Reproductive condition of adults and the timing of young-of-year recruitment indicate a May–July spawning season. They spawn in rock-gravel shoals where the female will drop her eggs and the males fertilize the eggs. This reproductive strategy allows for protection of the brood without the use of a brood guarder. Nearly 1,500 eggs are in a single brood allowing for a higher chance of survival. This is a common reproductive strategy for many darters. At full maturity the male will reach about 5 cm and the female will only be slightly smaller.

== Conservation ==
The olive darter depends on good water quality and fast-water habitats in upland streams. Impoundments have reduced available habitat for the olive darter, and remaining free-flowing mountain streams are vulnerable to degradation by excessive inputs of silt and sediment. Human activities related to land development on a large scale are continually altering the habitat of the olive darter. Currently P. squamata is a vulnerable species with a rank of 1 meaning that its vulnerability is caused by present or threatened destruction, modification, or reduction of a taxon's habitat or range. Streams are a very dynamic ecosystem that can be thrown off by even the slightest change to its environment. Humans are largely and almost fully to blame for the increasing loss of the olive darter. The lacks of Best Management Practices as well as construction of dams, road crossings and weirs are anthropogenic barriers that are leading to the destruction of stream habitats. The presence of these barriers causes stream fragmentation and loss of the natural flow of the stream. The stream above the dam oftentimes becomes a lake and is quickly sediment, while the streams below the dam become dry stream beds. If below the dam doesn't become a dry stream bed, chances are that it will become genetically isolated as well as cut off from spawning grounds, food, protection and required water flow velocity. Though not human caused, olive darter habitat is also becoming threatened due to the hemlock woolly adelgid. Hemlocks are a shade tolerant species that usually grow in moist areas, such as along streamside riparian zones. The adelgid kills a vast amount of Eastern hemlock trees (Tsuga canadensis) leading to siltation.
