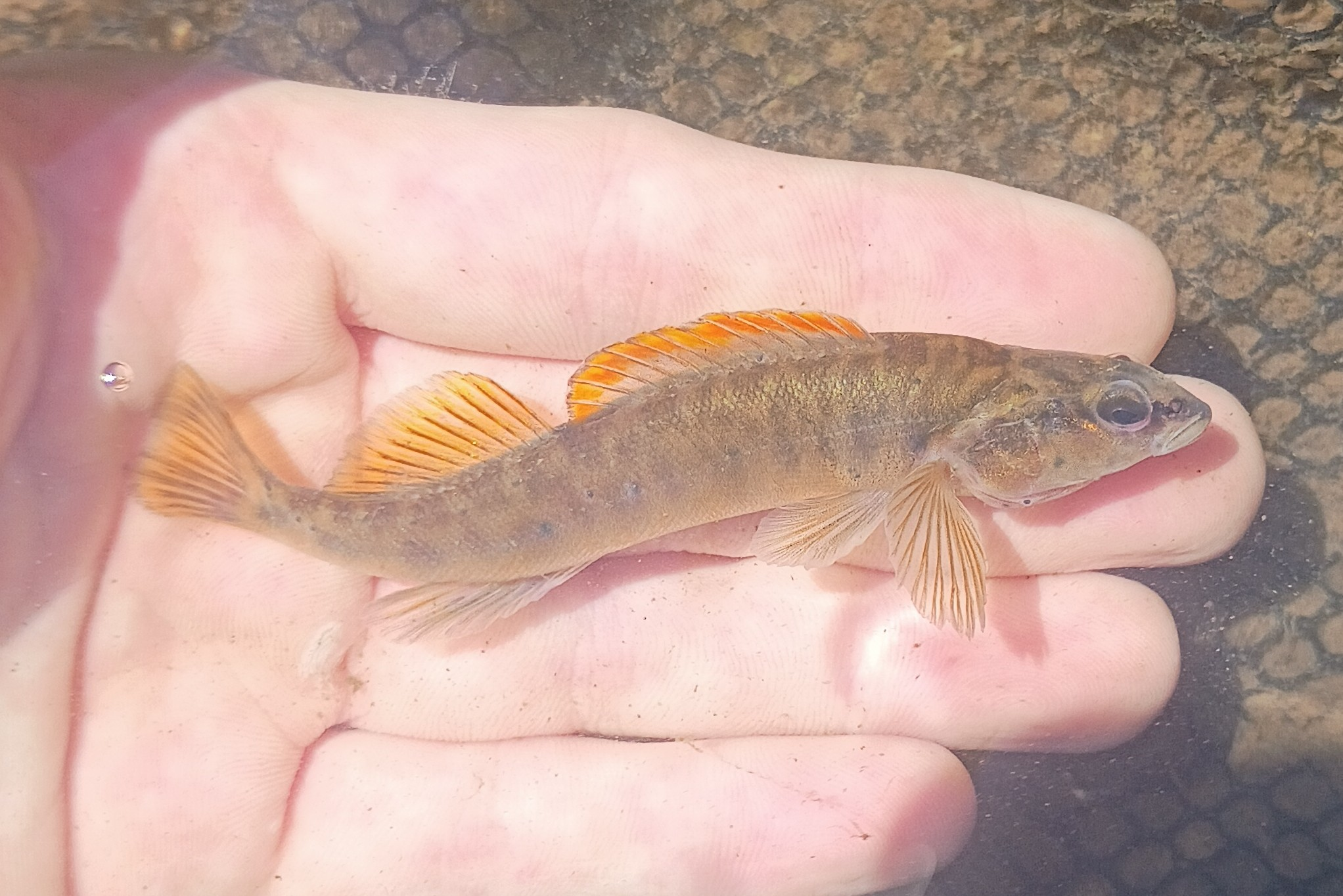
- Adult slenderhead darter from Cowley County, Kansas.

Conservation status
- Least Concern (IUCN 3.1)

Scientific classification
- Kingdom: Animalia
- Phylum: Chordata
- Class: Actinopterygii
- Order: Perciformes
- Family: Percidae
- Genus: Percina
- Species: P. phoxocephala

Binomial name
- Percina phoxocephala (Nelson, 1876)

Synonyms
- Etheostoma phoxocephalum Nelson, 1876

= Percina phoxocephala =

Species of fish

Percina phoxocephala, the slenderhead darter, is a species of freshwater ray-finned fish, a darter from the subfamily Etheostomatinae, part of the family Percidae, which also contains the perches, ruffes and pikeperches. It is found in North America in the central Ohio and Mississippi River basins, to northeastern South Dakota and the Lake Winnebago system in Wisconsin, and as far south as the Red River in eastern Oklahoma and northeast Texas, and as far east as southwest Minnesota and Central Kansas, Found typically in small to medium size rivers. It is a colorful species, with an average length of 6 to 9 centimeters (2.4 to 3.5 in). Males take on a deeper hue during the breeding season. It feeds on insect larvae and other small invertebrates, and spawns between April and June. It is a common fish with a very wide range and the International Union for Conservation of Nature has classified its conservation status as being of "least concern".

== Description ==
Slenderhead darters are typically 6–9 centimeters long, and can reach 10 centimeters at times. They have a pointed snout and a long narrow body. Their mouths are subterminal with the snout projecting only slightly beyond the mouth. Teeth are present on the jaws but are minute. The dorsal side of the body is light brown with 14–22 dark blotches down the center serving as camouflage to potential predators above the darter. The ventral side is cream colored which helps disguise the darter from potential predators below them. They have a row of 11–16 blotches down their sides that are taller than they are wide and connected by a thin lateral stripe. The dorsal fins are distinctly separate with the first dorsal fin containing a dark brown band near the base and an orange band near the outer edge. The second dorsal fin and tail have many small spots often forming rows. The pelvic fins are transparent and are located on the thoracic position and have two spines and 9–10 fin rays. The caudal fin has a square shape and is slightly forked. On breeding males the orange band on the dorsal fin is more intensely colored and thicker. Males also can have a dark dusky coloration to their body which often hides many of the blotches on their back and sides. Slenderheads have small scales and a lateral-line count ranging from 60 to 80. The female breast is naked except for the presence of one or two cternoid scales, the posterior half of the males breast is scaled with the anterior half being naked. Their conservation status is of least concern.

== Distribution and habitat ==
The slenderhead darter is a medium-sized darter and the most widely distributed of the four species assigned to the subgenus Swainia. It is found in North America from the central Ohio and Mississippi River basins, to northeastern South Dakota and the Lake Winnebago system (in Lake Michigan drainage) in Wisconsin, and as far south as the Red River in eastern Oklahoma and northeast Texas. Slenderhead darters are found in areas of relatively shallow water with riffles and a moderate current. They prefer areas over sand and gravel bottoms with little silt. They are bottom dwellers and found in the Benthic zone.

== Reproduction ==
Slenderhead darters spawn between late April and early June. The darters exhibit sexual dimorphism with the males pigmentation darkening in April and peaking during spawning. The first dorsal fin becomes orange and the dorsal rays become outlined in yellow. Older and larger males are darker and able to attract more females. Males are territorial and guard patches of swift flowing water 15–60 centimeters deep. The females will lay their eggs in riffles burying them in sand or gravel. The number of eggs laid ranges from 50 to 1000 with larger females producing more (one-year-olds on average lay 83 eggs and two-year-olds produce 270). Juveniles remain in the spawning habitat for 2–4 weeks after hatching. Slenderhead darters reach sexual maturity after one year.

== Development ==
When Slenderhead darters hatch, they are around 19 millimeters in length. There is continual growth during the first year, with one year old individuals averaging 46 millimeters. There is little influence of sex on size. Individuals will become sexually mature after one year. After approximately one month in the spawning habitat, the darters move to deeper water.

== Diet ==
Slenderhead darters are lie-in-wait predators that feed predominantly on insect larvae, crustaceans, and other aquatic invertebrates. A study conducted in Illinois examined the contents of several darters' stomachs and found that 99 percent of the contents were midge larvae, blackfly larvae, caddisfly larvae, and mayfly naiads.
