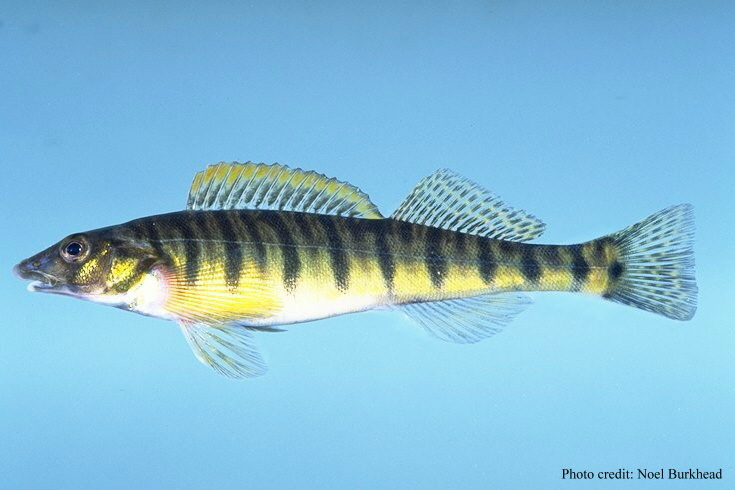

Conservation status
- Least Concern (IUCN 3.1)

Scientific classification
- Kingdom: Animalia
- Phylum: Chordata
- Class: Actinopterygii
- Order: Perciformes
- Family: Percidae
- Genus: Percina
- Species: P. kathae

Binomial name
- Percina kathae B. A. Thompson, 1997

= Mobile logperch =

Species of fish

The Mobile logperch (Percina kathae) is a species of freshwater ray-finned fish, a darter from the subfamily Etheostomatinae, part of the family Percidae, which also contains the perches, ruffes and pikeperches. It is found in the Mobile River basin in Mississippi, Alabama, Tennessee, and Georgia in the southeastern United States. It inhabits clear shallow water and is often associated with Podostemum (riverweed). It grows to about 18 cm (7 in) and is distinguishable from other darters by the distinctive shape of its head and by its pale-yellow base color, with narrow bars on back and sides. It feeds on small invertebrates and breeds between February and May. Lake fish move into small streams to spawn. It is a common fish with a wide range and the International Union for Conservation of Nature has classified its conservation status as being of "least concern".

== Anatomy and description ==
Logperches are easily distinguished from most other darters by their tiger-like coloration. They also have distinctive head and snout shapes. Logperches are a pale-yellow base color, with narrow bars on the side and back. Logperches reach a maximum size of about 18 cm (7 in) and a maximum age of about four years.

== Distribution and habitat ==
Mobile logperches live primarily in the Southeastern U.S. They are endemic to all river systems of the Mobile River basin in Mississippi, Alabama, Tennessee, and Georgia. They are particularly widespread in the upper Cahaba and Coosa River systems. Populations of the Mobile logperch and gulf logperch (Percina suttkusi) occur together at certain locations in the Alabama, Black Warrior, and upper and lower Tombigbee River systems. Studies have been conducted in the Conasauga River (Georgia and Tennessee); Luxapallila Creek, Mississippi; and the Neosho River in Kansas.

The Mobile logperch is found in shallow water in the summer, but uses deeper reaches, or uses depths randomly, in all other seasons. Like other logperches, they inhabit clear, gravelly streams and lakes. Logperches live in mostly shallow, clear water waterways. These habitats are associated with Podostemum (riverweed). Some species (including Percina) indicate that longitudinal position was a strong covariate with little support that Podostemum cover influenced occupancy. The greatest densities of Mobile logperch occur over gravel or sand substrates in moderate current or in lakes over sand and mud substrates.

== Life history ==
Juveniles eat organisms such as rotifers, copepods, and waterfleas. As they grow, they incorporate a greater variety of small aquatic creatures. They eat mostly aquatic insects (especially mayfly and midge larvae), and also may eat young snails, waterfleas, leeches, and fish eggs (including their own) when available. Percina show broad diversity of reproductive behavior and life history traits. Large numbers of reservoir-based individuals frequently migrate upstream into small flowing streams from late February into May to spawn (in Carrolls Creek, a tributary of Lake Tuscaloosa, Alabama). Females are thought to bury eggs in riffles or shoals of sand or gravel. Mobile logperch may live three to four years. They sometimes fall prey to piscivorous fish (more often in lakes than in streams). These fish include lake trout, walleye, rock bass, largemouth bass, burbot, and northern pike. When they spend time in slow and shallow water, they also are eaten by fish-eating birds, such as terns and mergansers.

== Etymology ==
The Mobile logperch was first formally described in 1997 by the American ichthyologist Dr. Bruce A. Thompson (1946–2007) and its specific name honors Thompson's wife, Kathy S. Thompson.

== Management ==
The Mobile logperch is not listed as endangered under Tennessee state law. Not much research on changes in this species' population over time and no management practices have been put in place to protect the Mobile logperch. The International Union for Conservation of Nature has assessed the conservation status of this fish as being of "least concern".
