= Sharpnose darter =

Conservation status
- Least Concern (IUCN 3.1)

- Apparently Secure (NatureServe)

Scientific classification
- Kingdom: Animalia
- Phylum: Chordata
- Class: Actinopterygii
- Order: Perciformes
- Family: Percidae
- Genus: Percina
- Species: P. oxyrhynchus

Binomial name
- Percina oxyrhynchus (C. L. Hubbs & Raney, 1939)

Synonyms
- Hadropterus oxyrhynchus Hubbs & Raney, 1939

Species of fish

The sharpnose darter (Percina oxyrhynchus) is a species of freshwater ray-finned fish, a darter from the subfamily Etheostomatinae, part of the family Percidae, which also contains the perches, ruffes and pikeperches. It is found in North America where it occurs in the southern tributaries of upper Ohio River, to the Kentucky River in Kentucky, south in the New River drainage to North Carolina. It prefers gravel runs and riffles of small to medium-sized rivers.

It is presumed to be extirpated from Pennsylvania.
