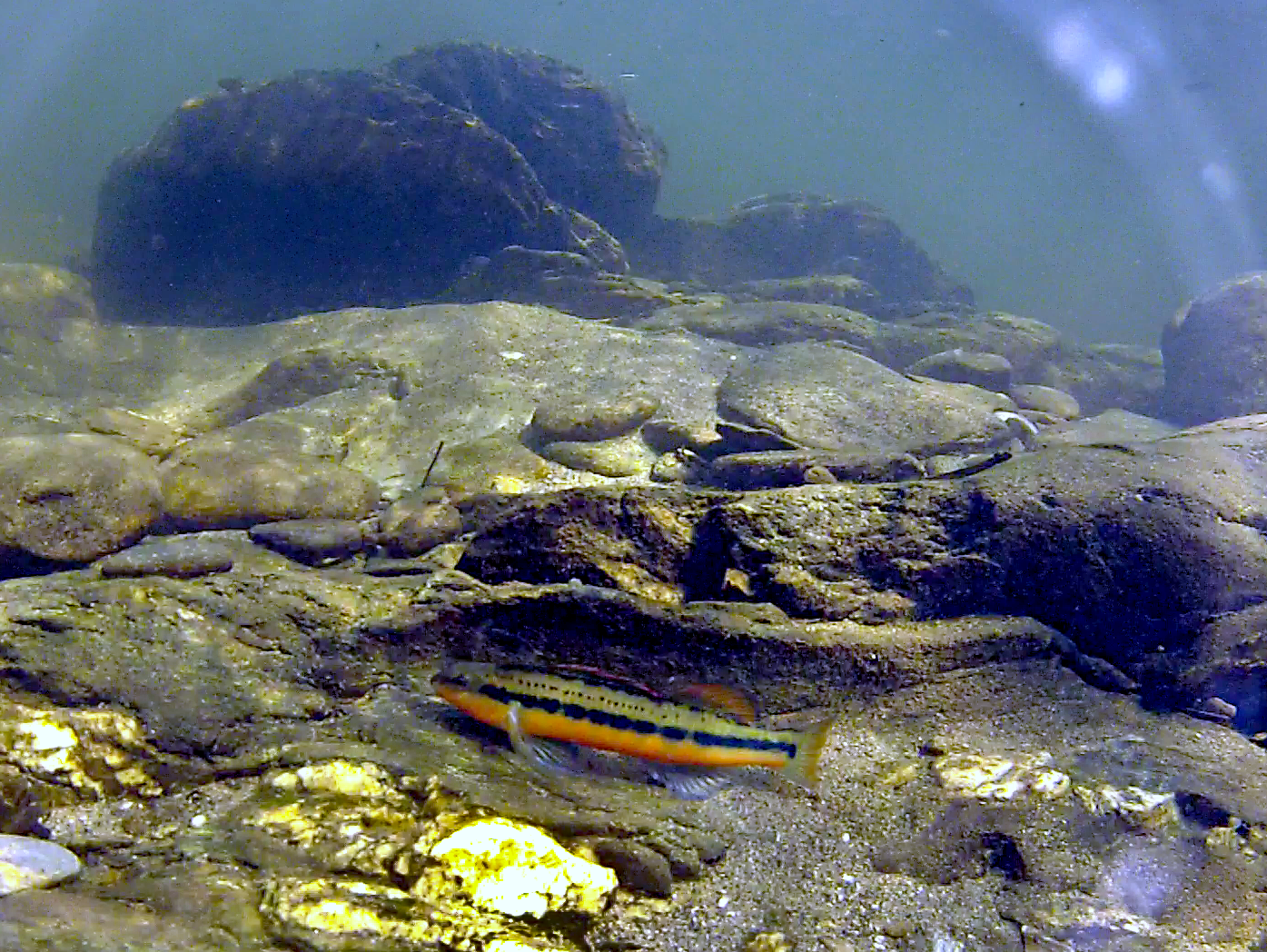
- Adult male tangerine darter

Conservation status
- Least Concern (IUCN 3.1)

Scientific classification
- Kingdom: Animalia
- Phylum: Chordata
- Class: Actinopterygii
- Order: Perciformes
- Family: Percidae
- Genus: Percina
- Species: P. aurantiaca

Binomial name
- Percina aurantiaca (Cope, 1868

Synonyms
- Cottogaster aurantiacus Cope, 1868

= Tangerine darter =

Species of fish

The tangerine darter or river slick (Percina aurantiaca) is a small species of freshwater ray-finned fish, a darter from the subfamily Etheostomatinae, part of the family Percidae, which also contains the perches, ruffes and pikeperches. It is found in the eastern United States. It grows to a length of 4.3 to 7.1 inches (11 to 18 cm), males being bright orange-red while females are yellow. It is insectivorous, picking insect larvae off aquatic plants and the riverbed, and sometimes rolling small stones over to expose prey. It breeds in late spring and early summer, typically in shallow sandy or gravelly riffles. Pollution and habitat degradation may be a problem in parts of its range; however, it is a fairly common fish with a wide range and the International Union for Conservation of Nature has classified its conservation status as being of "least concern".

== Appearance and anatomy ==
Tangerine darters are typically 4.3 to 7.1 inches (11 to 18 cm) in length, large for a darter species. The males are usually a bright orangish-red color, more elaborately colored than the females, which are yellow.

== Distribution ==
They are a fairly common species; however, their range is limited to clear, cool streams of the southern Appalachian Mountains. The tangerine darter is found throughout mountainous regions of the upper Tennessee River drainage. It resides in smaller rivers and is most common in the Emory, Hiwassee, Little, Little Pigeon, and Tellico rivers. It is found in eastern Tennessee, northern Georgia, and western North Carolina, and Virginia. In Georgia and North Carolina, it is listed as a historic species in need of management.

== Habitat and life history ==
The tangerine darter inhabits clear and cool creeks or small rivers. In these rivers it likes areas that have large boulders, bedrock and a gravel substrate. It also likes to swim in the deeper riffles of these rivers. In winter, the tangerine moves to deeper pools.

The tangerine darter spawns in late spring to summer, in shallow sandy gravel riffles that have consistent flowing water. The breeding season, which is triggered by water temperature, begins in May and runs through July. Spawning occurs at about three to four years of age, although sexual maturity comes much earlier for tangerine darters, with males reaching maturity at one year of age and females two years of age. The species' life span is about four years.

Tangerine darters spawn by first the male mounting the female; the female then scatters her eggs over the gravel, while the male disperses milt and fertilizes the eggs. While doing this both the male and female make a quivering motion. Females choose the most brightly colored males (bright orange black line with some blue where orange meets the black). Males also become territorial during mating season and will defend their spawning riffles. Females lay between 120 and 1,100 eggs. The tangerine darter does not care for its eggs. Juveniles are found in calmer water and grow to between 2 and 3 inches (5.1 and 7.6 cm) in their first year of growth.

== Diet ==
The tangerine darter is an insectivorous fish. Juveniles feed primarily on mayflies and midges, and adults feed on mayflies and caddisflies. Tangerine darters get their food by searching through the aquatic vegetation and eating the aquatic insects off of the plants. Adults are also big enough to roll small gravel in search of prey. Although the tangerine darter is not a game species, it is sometimes caught by fly fishermen using mayfly and caddisfly patterns.

== Threats ==
The biggest threat to the tangerine darter is habitat degradation. This is due to point and nonpoint pollution, erosion and sedimentation.

On the Pigeon River in East Tennessee, tangerine darter populations declined and recovered. In 1908, Champion International built a paper mill on the river and decimated many of the native fish. In the 1980s the mill cleaned up its refuse and the river is steadily getting better. Tangerine darters have been successfully reintroduced back into the Pigeon River downstream of the paper mill.

In general, the tangerine darter has a wide range, has a large number of subpopulations and a large total population size, and no major threats have been identified, so the International Union for Conservation of Nature has classified its conservation status as being of "least concern".

== General references ==
- Chadwick D. 2010. "Silent Stream." National Geographic Vol 217 Issue 4 116–128.
- Etnier D. 1993 "The Fishes of Tennessee" University of Tennessee Press.
- Greenberg L. 1993. "A descriptive and experimental study of microhabitat use by young of the year benthic stream fishes" Ecology of Freshwater Fish.
- Phillips C. 2007. "Captive Propagation of Tangerine Darters for Re-introduction in the Pigeon River, Tennessee" Master's thesis University of Tennessee
- Shceffler P. 2007 Request for Section 26a approval for Pedestrian Bridge at Seven Islands Wildlife refuge"
- Watson B. 2006 "Tangerine Darter" North Carolina Wildlife Profiles
