= Percina austroperca =

Southern logperch

Conservation status
- Least Concern (IUCN 3.1)

Scientific classification
- Kingdom: Animalia
- Phylum: Chordata
- Class: Actinopterygii
- Order: Perciformes
- Family: Percidae
- Genus: Percina
- Species: P. austroperca

Binomial name
- Percina austroperca B. A. Thompson, 1995

Species of fish

Percina austroperca, the southern logperch, is a small species of freshwater ray-finned fish, a darter from the subfamily Etheostomatinae, part of the family Percidae, which also contains the perches, ruffes and pikeperches. They are highly resilient with a minimum population doubling time of less than 15 months. It is found in the Escambia and Choctawhatchee river systems in western Florida and southern Alabama.
