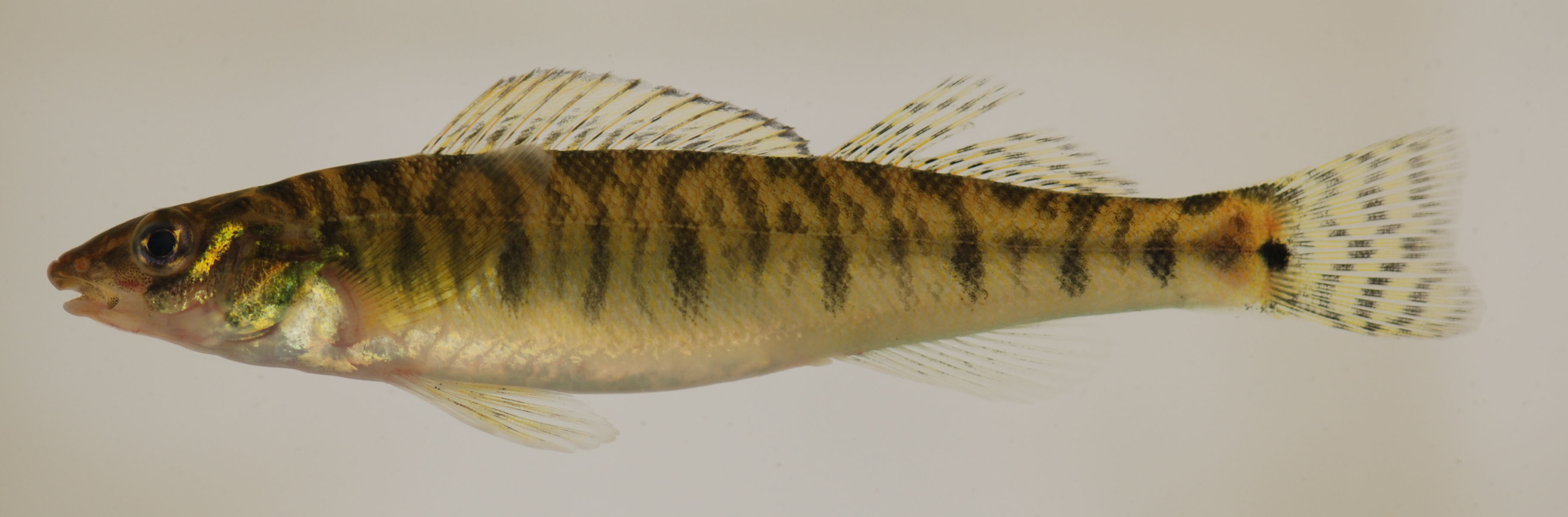

Conservation status
- Vulnerable (IUCN 3.1)

Scientific classification
- Kingdom: Animalia
- Phylum: Chordata
- Class: Actinopterygii
- Division: Teleostei
- Order: Perciformes
- Family: Percidae
- Genus: Percina
- Species: P. bimaculata

Binomial name
- Percina bimaculata Haldeman, 1844

= Chesapeake logperch =

Species of fish

The Chesapeake logperch (Percina bimaculata) is a small species of freshwater ray-finned fish, a darter from the subfamily Etheostomatinae, part of the family Percidae, which also contains the perches, ruffes and pikeperches. It is found in the Chesapeake Bay drainages. It prefers gravel runs and riffles of small to medium-sized rivers.

== Distribution ==
The Chesapeake logperch (Percina bimaculata) is located in the Northeast region of the United States. Historically, it is known for being located in the Chesapeake Bay watershed in the district of Columbia, Maryland, Pennsylvania, and Virginia. This range included the lower Susquehanna River basin of Pennsylvania and Maryland, as well as the middle to lower Potomac River basin of Maryland, Virginia, and District of Columbia. However, the Chesapeake logperch's presence has not been recorded from the Potomac River basin since the 1930s and is currently found in the lower Susquehanna River basin as well as Winters Run and the North East River, which drain into the upper portion of the Chesapeake Bay in Maryland.

== Habitat ==
The Chesapeake logperch are freshwater, benthopelagic fish that live near gravel runs and riffles in clear, medium-sized rivers. Flowing pools associated with areas that contain large rocks and boulders are also likely habitats. All known collections have been observed in large river habitats or near the mouth of tributaries that drain into large rivers. Little is known about their reproductive habitats.

== Taxonomy ==
Formerly, the Chesapeake logperch was included in Percina caprodes, however, based on morphological and molecular data, Near (2008) determined that it warrants recognition as a distinct species with limited global distribution restricted to the Chesapeake Bay watershed. Currently, the Chesapeake logperch is defined under Percina bimaculata and found under the class Actinopterygii, or ray-finned fishes. Genetic analyses of the Chesapeake logperch revealed multiple morphologically distinct characteristics from the common logperch. The Chesapeake logperch usually has the following combination of characteristics: 7 to 11 irregular lateral bars; orange-yellow band as well as spines located on the anterior dorsal fin (poorly defined in females), nape of adults naked, breast naked except for modified breast scales, supra occipital and preceptorial naked, and no preceptorial blotch. Their scales are generally harsh and rough to the feel, commonly known as having ctenoid scales. Located on the pelvic fin is one spine along with several fin rays which are positioned under the belly, back near the anus in the abdominal position.

== Research & Recovery ==
Currently, the Chesapeake logperch is classified as threatened by the states of Pennsylvania and Maryland due to its limited global distribution within only a small portion of its historical range. In 2019, the U.S. Fish and Wildlife Service (USFWS) funded a project led by the Pennsylvania Fish and Boat Commission (PFBC) to study the life history of the species and begin efforts to restore populations of Chesapeake logperch to previous native habitat where the fish are no longer present. As part of the project, adult brood stock were collected from several tributaries of the Susquehanna River and approximately 1,500 juvenile fish were cultured at laboratories at Conservation Fisheries, Inc. in Knoxville, Tennessee, and under the direction of Distinguished Professor of Ichthyology, Jay Stauffer Jr., PhD at Penn State University in State College, Pennsylvania. On September 26, 2019, the PFBC along with project partners including the USFWS, Penn State University, Susquehanna River Basin Commission, Pennsylvania Biological Survey, Maryland Department of Natural Resources and Conservation Fisheries, Inc. successfully released 1,500 healthy Chesapeake Logperch juveniles into Chiques Creek, near Columbia, Lancaster County, PA. Future research will include surveys of the area to determine the survival of the introduced fish and gauge natural reproduction and recruitment.

== Video ==
A video of the research and recovery project was produced by the Pennsylvania Fish and Boat Commission and can be found here.
