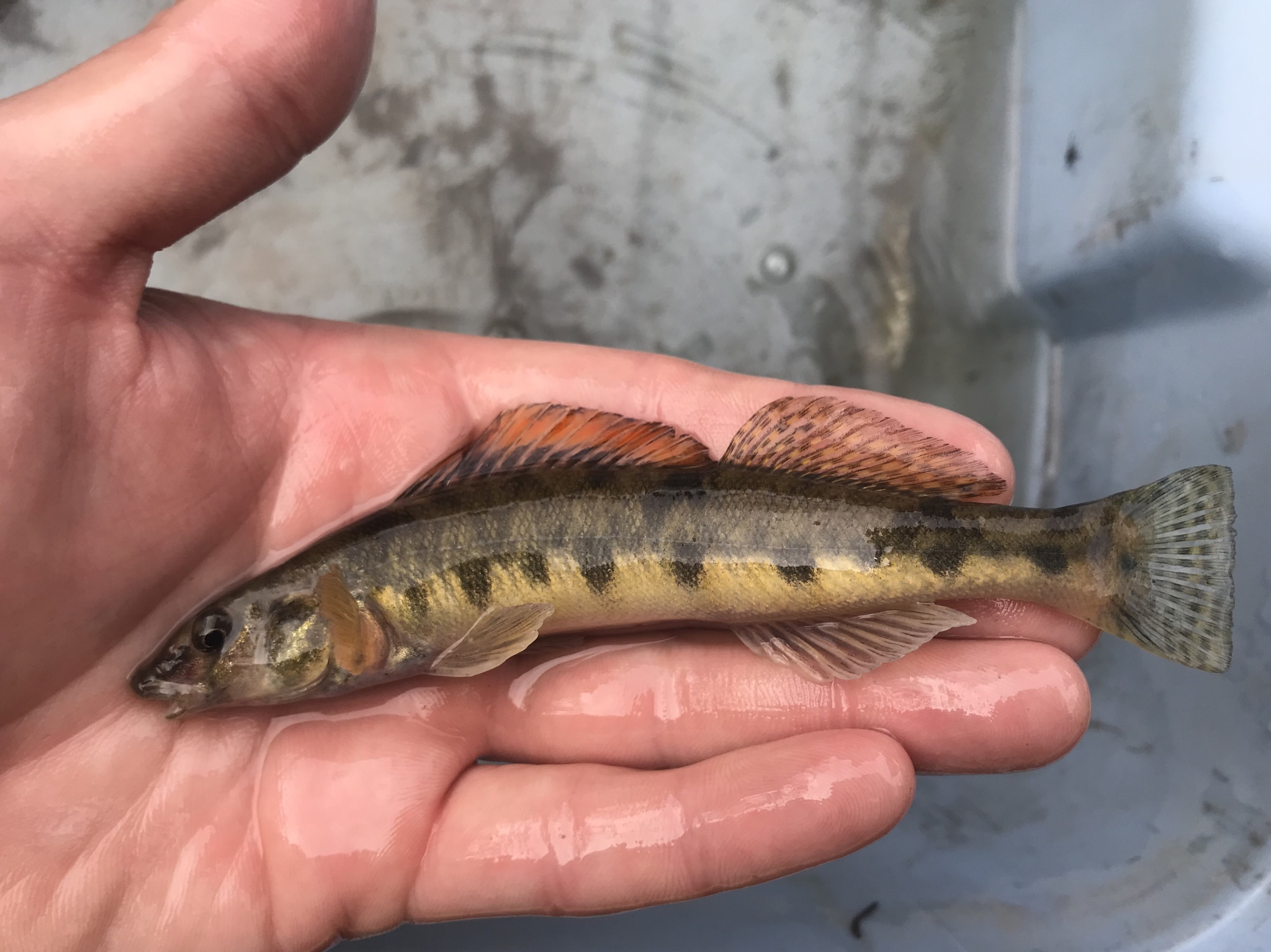
- Texas Logperch (Percina carbonaria)

Conservation status
- Least Concern (IUCN 3.1)

Scientific classification
- Kingdom: Animalia
- Phylum: Chordata
- Class: Actinopterygii
- Order: Perciformes
- Family: Percidae
- Genus: Percina
- Species: P. carbonaria

Binomial name
- Percina carbonaria (Baird & Girard, 1853)

Synonyms
- Pileoma carbonaria Baird & Girard, 1853

= Percina carbonaria =

Species of fish

Percina carbonaria, the Texas logperch, is a species of freshwater ray-finned fish, a darter from the subfamily Etheostomatinae, part of the family Percidae, which also contains the perches, ruffes and pikeperches.

== Geographic distribution ==
Found only in the Brazos, Colorado, Concho River, Guadalupe and San Antonio River drainages in Texas.
