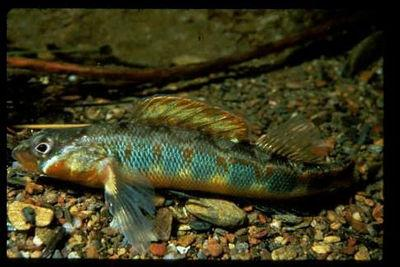

Conservation status
- Least Concern (IUCN 3.1)

Scientific classification
- Kingdom: Animalia
- Phylum: Chordata
- Class: Actinopterygii
- Order: Perciformes
- Family: Percidae
- Genus: Percina
- Species: P. evides

Binomial name
- Percina evides (D. S. Jordan & H. E. Copeland, 1877)

Synonyms
- Alvordius evides Jordan & Copeland, 1877

= Gilt darter =

Species of fish

The gilt darter (Percina evides) is a species of freshwater ray-finned fish, a darter from the subfamily Etheostomatinae, part of the family Percidae, which also contains the perches, ruffes and pikeperches. It can be found in a number of states in the Mississippi River drainage of the United States although it has been extirpated from some river systems in which it was at one time present, mostly due to siltation and pollution problems. Males are more colorful than females and can grow to a length of about 9 cm (3.5 in). It is a benthic fish that feeds primarily on small aquatic insect larvae. Males form territories during the breeding season in late spring and early summer. Spawning typically takes place at the upper ends of riffles with sandy and gravelly bottoms interspersed with larger cobbles. Some organisations are endeavouring to conserve populations of the gilt darter and re-introduce it to states where the fish has been extirpated but suitable habitat still exists.

== Description ==
Male gilt darters grow faster and larger than females. They reach a length of around 70mm in their third year. Larger specimens, up to 94mm have been reported in the Ozarks. Males are also more colorful than females.

== Distribution ==
As currently described, the gilt darter is found in the upper portions of the Mississippi River Basin of North America. The geographic distribution of this species historically covered 18 states in the Mississippi River drainage, but this species is now believed to be extirpated from New York, Iowa, Illinois, and Indiana. It is found in western tributaries of the Mississippi River Basin from the White River in northern Arkansas to the St. Croix River of Minnesota and Wisconsin. Its Eastern Range extends from tributaries of the Tennessee River system in northern Alabama up to New York in the Ohio River system. It was also found in Indiana in the Maumee River system. Locally, the gilt darter is found regularly throughout Tennessee in appropriate, high quality habitats. This species is sensitive to siltation and can be extirpated from degraded streams. This species has been lost in several drainages of the Midwest due to stream degradation. According to Ohio's Division of Wildlife the gilt darter has not been seen in Ohio since 1893. The last time the gilt darter was seen in Indiana was in 1977, and it is also believed to be extirpated from Illinois and New York. However Brant Fisher, Nongame Aquatic Biologist with the Indiana DNR had this to say in, CURRENT STATUS AND DISTRIBUTION OF INDIANA'S SEVEN ENDANGERED DARTER SPECIES (PERCIDAE), "Currently, a single population of Gilt Darter remains in Indiana, in the portion of the Tippecanoe River upstream of Lake Shafer. This population will remain completely isolated, with no chance of expanding its range further downstream because of Lake Shafer and Norway Dam (and then further downstream by Lake Freeman and Oakdale Dam).

== Ecology ==
The gilt darter is a benthic fish that feeds primarily on small aquatic insect larvae. In a study of gilt darters in the Sunrise River of Minnesota, their diet was found to consist almost exclusively of immature mayflies (46% by number), dipterans (43%), and caddisflies (10%); the composition varied seasonally and with age. A later study that included sites in the St. Croix River found the same dominant food types, although the relative contributions of each type varied considerably across sites. Dietary information on gilt darters from the Little Tennessee River showed a dependence on macro invertebrates. Specifically, midge, mayfly and caddis larvae were most preyed upon. During the warmer months, black fly larvae were also an important forage food. Snails have also been found in the stomach contents of this species. Gilt darters were observed following feeding logperch attempting to steal food as the logperch foraged along the bottom. Another dietary study of nine sympatric darter species in Pennsylvania showed dietary preferences of this species. Under the study conditions, the gilt darter revealed a very diverse diet containing 7–10 taxa of aquatic invertebrates. It also consumed larger prey and more fish eggs than other Etheostoma darter species it often associates with.

At one site in Indiana, the gilt darter was found in association with central stonerollers (Campostoma anomalum), suckermouth minnows (Phenacobius mirabilis), creek chubs (Semotilus atromaculatus), western blacknose dace (Rhinichthys obtusus), silverjaw minnow (Notropis buccatus), bluntnose minnow (Pimephales notatus), sand shiner (Notropis stramineus), spotfin shiner (Cyprinella spiloptera), Johnny darter (Etheostoma nigrum), rainbow darter (Etheostoma caeruleum), and blackside darters (Percina maculata).

The gilt darter was found to prefer upland cool-water streams. Specifically, they are often found in areas of the stream with higher velocities and more cobble on the streambed. They were also found to prefer areas of the stream subject to higher erosion rates. Larger gilt darters were found more often around heterogeneous substrata and more boulders than smaller gilt darters.

== Life history ==
The reproductive season of the gilt darter is in the spring. Southern populations have been reported to begin the breeding season earlier than northern populations. Ripe females were caught in Arkansas as early as late April and early May. In Virginia, gilt darters were reported to spawn in May. In Missouri, breeding males were reported to be found in late May. In Minnesota, breeding typically occurred over a 6-week period in June and July, although it began in middle May in one year. Water temperatures at the time of breeding were 16–23˚C. Breeding was observed in the Little River of Tennessee from early June through early July. Males were observed establishing specific territories for breeding. They were reported to spawn at temperatures of 17–20 degrees Celsius. Ideal spawning habitat was at the upper ends of riffles with sandy and gravelly bottoms interspersed with larger cobble. Females produced from 130–400 eggs which hatch and mature past the larval stage within 2 weeks.

== Current management ==
The gilt darter's range has been quietly declining as siltation and pollution have caused local extirpations across its range. The gilt darter was once found in 18 states. It is now believed to be extirpated from 4 of them. It is only listed as an apparently secure species in 3 states (Tennessee, North Carolina, and Arkansas). The remaining 11 states list the gilt darter as vulnerable, imperiled, or critically imperiled. However, some fisheries biologists have taken notice of this decline and have developed new propagation techniques that are suitable for this species. One organization in particular, Conservation Fisheries, Incorporated (CFI) is at the forefront of restoration activities. A recent reintroduction project on the Pigeon River in Tennessee has successfully restored a gilt darter population where they were previously extirpated. This project was a joint-effort between the University of Tennessee and CFI. Biologists are hoping that information gained from this successful reintroduction will allow them to attempt restoration efforts in other states where the gilt darter has been extirpated but suitable habitat is available.
