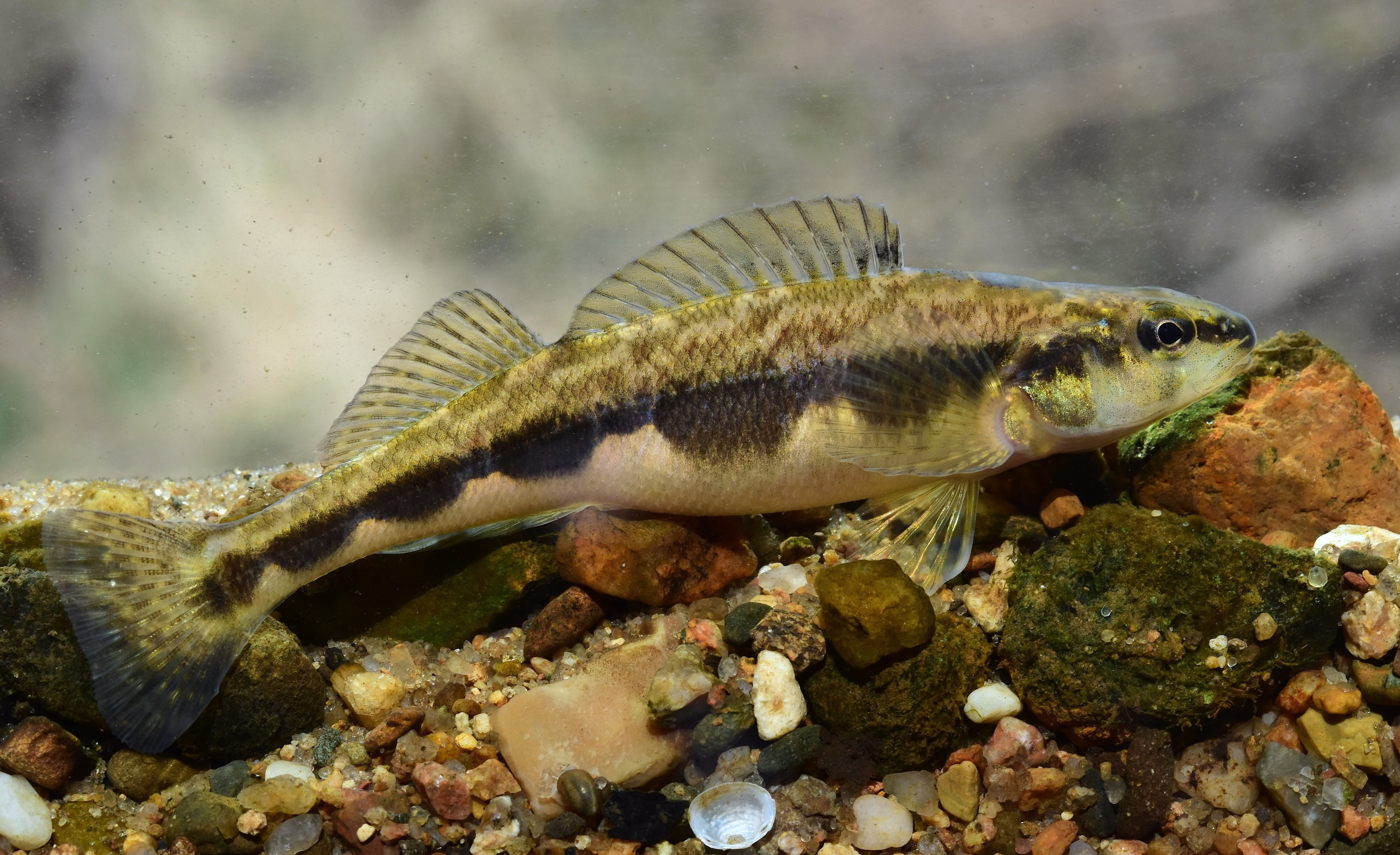

Conservation status
- Least Concern (IUCN 3.1)

Scientific classification
- Kingdom: Animalia
- Phylum: Chordata
- Class: Actinopterygii
- Order: Perciformes
- Family: Percidae
- Genus: Percina
- Species: P. maculata

Binomial name
- Percina maculata (Girard, 1859)

Synonyms
- Alvordius maculatus Girard, 1859

= Percina maculata =

Species of fish

Percina maculata, the blackside darter, is a species of freshwater ray-finned fish, a darter from the subfamily Etheostomatinae, part of the family Percidae, which also contains the perches, ruffes and pikeperches. It is a widespread inhabitant of streams and rivers in the Mississippi River watershed. Like other darters it prefers rocky riffles and sandy runs, but is tolerant of pools and still water as well. It is one of the 324 fish species found in Tennessee.

== Physical characteristics ==
The Blackside darter is easily distinguishable by its olive coloration. The Blackside darter tends to have darker colors, primarily dark browns, olives and blacks, with occasional white parts. A prominent feature on the fish is a strip along the sides made up of 6–9 black spots. Black spots can also be found below the eyes and on the caudal fin. On average Blacksides are around two or three inches in length but have the potential for sizes of 4 inches. The Blackside darter has two dorsal fins and a rounded caudal fin. The first dorsal fin has spinous rays while the second has soft rays. The mouth of the Blackside darter is in a terminal position, which means the mouth opens at the anterior side of the snout.

== Habitat and Geographic distribution ==
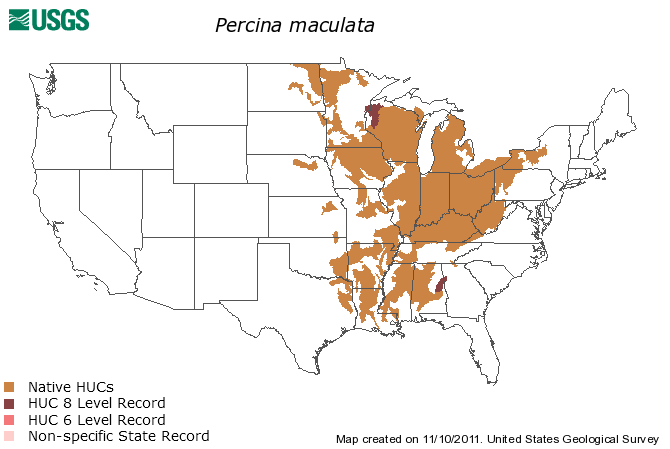
Percina maculata-distribution

Blackside darter is found in areas of small to medium-sized rivers and streams, that are clean and free of most pollution. The areas they are found will have slower current and have spaces to hide like roots and natural debris. These fish are widespread in the United States and can be found in the Hudson Bay, Mississippi River basin, and the Gulf drainages from Mobile Bay in Alabama to the Calcasieu River in Louisiana. They have also been found in the Minnesota river basin, Whetstone Creek, Big Sioux basin, Pipestone, and other areas around the Great Lakes. They were present in the Big Sandy drainage in the early 1900s, but have not been found recently in any Virginia drainages.

== Reproduction ==
Spawning season for Blacksides starts in spring, starting around April and lasting to late June or early July. The fish start by moving up stream then they spawn over sand and gravel around slow riffles, and then bury the eggs. The parents provide no additional care for eggs or young. The young are born and will mature by the age of one or two, living up to five years.

== Diet ==
The Blackside darter mainly feeds on insects, like mayflies and midge larve but has also been known to ingest other small fish and plant material. Blackside darters will also eat small crustaceans and other small aquatic animals.

== Conservation ==
Since the Blackside darter lives in clean streams it can be detrimental if anything alters its habitat. Garbage and pollution can wipe out populations of Blacksides if the change is too sudden and is persistent in their home. Although overall they are in no real threat, and as a species are doing well.

== Etymology of scientific name ==
Percina is the Latin diminutive for perch, and maculata is from the Latin word maculatus meaning "spotted".
