= Ozark logperch =

Conservation status
- Least Concern (IUCN 3.1)

Scientific classification
- Kingdom: Animalia
- Phylum: Chordata
- Class: Actinopterygii
- Order: Perciformes
- Family: Percidae
- Genus: Percina
- Species: P. fulvitaenia

Binomial name
- Percina fulvitaenia Morris & Page, 1981

Species of fish

The Ozark logperch (Percina fulvitaenia) is a species of freshwater ray-finned fish, a darter from the subfamily Etheostomatinae, part of the family Percidae, which also contains the perches, ruffes and pikeperches. It is found in North America in the Meramec River, the southern tributaries of the Missouri River in Missouri and Kansas, and the Arkansas River system in Arkansas, Missouri, Kansas, and Oklahoma. It prefers gravel runs and riffles of small to medium-sized rivers.
