= Thomas J. Near =

American evolutionary ichthyologist (born 1969)

- Born: April 11, 1969 (age 57)
- Education: Northern Illinois University (B.A., B.S., M.S.), University of Illinois (Ph.D.)
- Known for: Phylogenetics, Antarctic Fish, Freshwater North American Fishes
- Spouse(s): Allison Near, J.D.
- Children: 2
- Scientific career
- Fields: Evolutionary Biology, Ichthyology
- Workplaces: Yale University
- Website: Near Lab

Thomas J. Near is an American evolutionary ichthyologist who is currently a Professor and Chair of the Department of Ecology and Evolutionary Biology at Yale University as well as the Bingham Oceanographic Curator of Ichthyology at the Peabody Museum of Natural History. Near was the Head of Saybrook College, one of Yale University's residential colleges, from 2015 until 2026. (The title was originally "Master" but this was replaced with "Head" in 2016.)

== Taxon described by him ==
- See Category:Taxa named by Thomas J. Near
