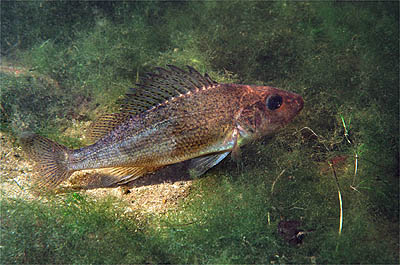
- Eurasian ruffe, (G. cernua)

Scientific classification
- Kingdom: Animalia
- Phylum: Chordata
- Class: Actinopterygii
- Order: Perciformes
- Family: Percidae
- Subfamily: Percinae
- Genus: Gymnocephalus; Bloch, 1793

Type species
- Perca schraetser Linnaeus, 1758

Synonyms
- Acerina Güldenstädt, 1775 (either unavailable or needs to be suppressed); Cephimnus Rafinesque, 1815; Acerina Cuvier, 1816; Cernua J. Fleming, 1828; Gremilla Gistel, 1848; Leptoperca T. N. Gill, 1861

= Gymnocephalus =

Genus of fishes

Gymnocephalus is a genus of ray-finned fishes from the family Percidae, which includes the perches, pike-perches and darters. They are from the Western Palearctic area, although one species, Gymnocephalus cernua has been accidentally introduced to the Great Lakes region where it is regarded as an invasive species. They have the common name "ruffe" and resemble the true perches in the genus Perca, but are usually smaller and have a different pattern.

== Characteristics ==
The species within the genus Gymnocephalus have a number of characters in common including that their dorsal fins are not completely separate, they have enlarged canals extending from the lateral line on their heads, the preorbital bone covers the maxillary bone, presence of setiform or bristle-like teeth, having very few or no vomerine and palatine teeth and the possession of three paired bones in the neck, known as extrascapulars, in their lateral line system, of which, two are simple tubes.

== Species ==
There are currently five recognized species in this genus:

- Gymnocephalus acerina (J. F. Gmelin, 1789) (Donets ruffe)
- Gymnocephalus ambriaelacus Geiger & Schliewen, 2010
- Gymnocephalus baloni Holčík & K. Hensel, 1974 (Balon's ruffe)
- Gymnocephalus cernua (Linnaeus, 1758) (ruffe)
- Gymnocephalus schraetser (Linnaeus, 1758) (schraetzer)

== Taxonomy ==
Gymnocephalus was created by the German physician and naturalist Marcus Elieser Bloch (1723–1799) with Perca schraester as the type species. It has traditionally been placed in the subfamily Percinae alongside the true perch of the genus Perca. However, Gymnocephalus appears to be the sister taxon to both the Percinae and to the Luciopercinae. The 5th edition of Fishes of the World treats Gymnocephalus as the only genus in the monotypic subfamily Acerinae, although Gill's Gymnocephalinae is referred to in some sources. Eschmeyer's Catalog of Fishes returns to the old classification of keeping Gymnocephalus in Percinae.

The name of the genus is a compound of the Greek gymno meaning "naked" and kephalos meaning "head". Within the genus molecular studies have shown that the ruffe G. cernua is sister to a clade consisting of the Danube ruff G. baloni and the schraetzer or striped ruffe G. schraetser, and that these last two species originated from a common ancestor about 8 million years ago and it has also been suggested that the relatively newly described G. ambriaelacus may be synonymous with G. baloni. G. acerina has not had its genetics sampled which would assist understanding of the genus's phylogenetics.

== Geographic distribution ==
The species in the genus Gymnocephalus are found in Europe. One species, G. cernua, originating from the river Elbe in Germany, was accidentally introduced to North America in ballast water near the mouth of the St Louis River in Lake Superior. This species has also been introduced outside of its native range in Europe.
