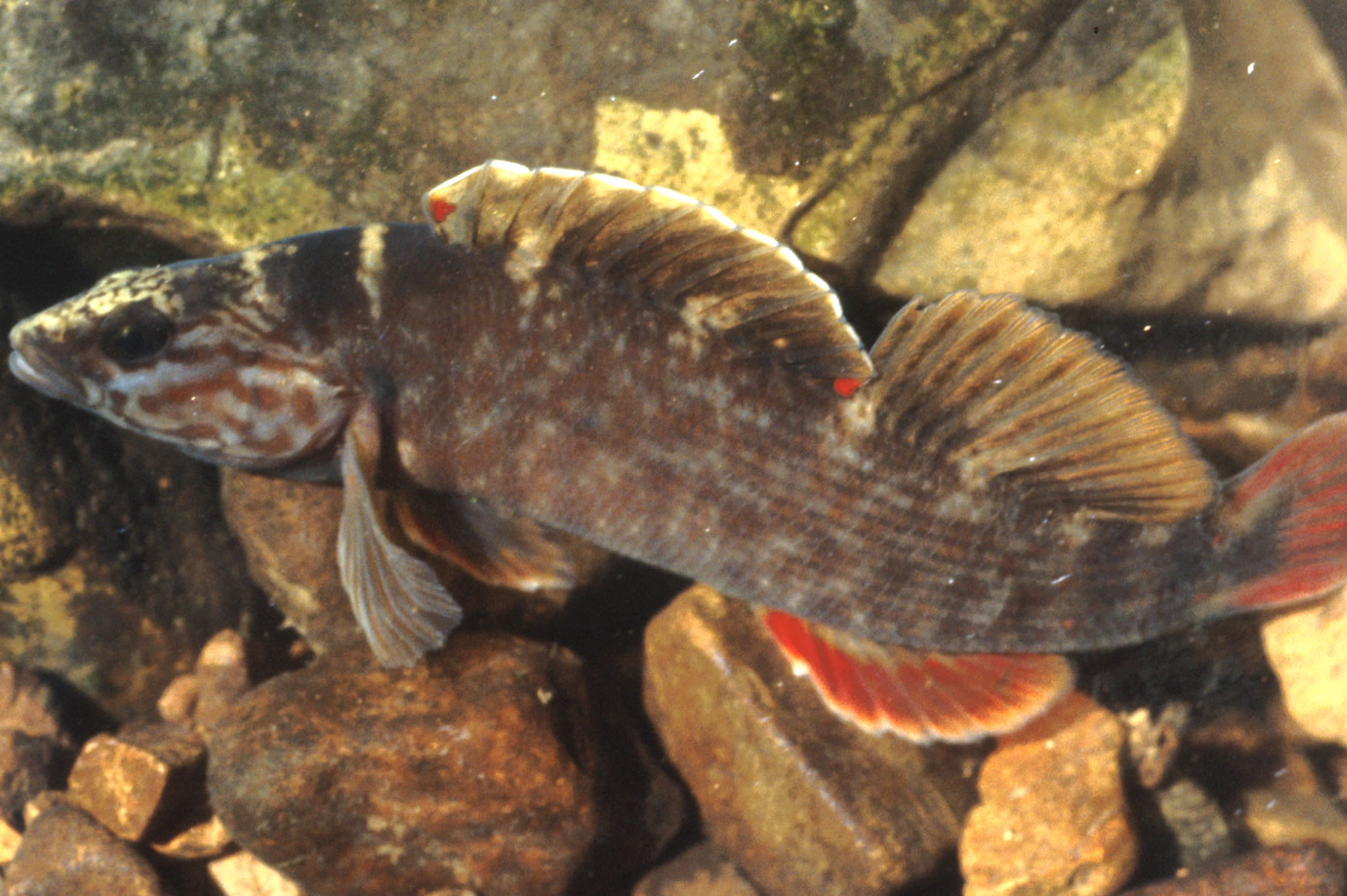
- Coppercheek darter (N. aquali)
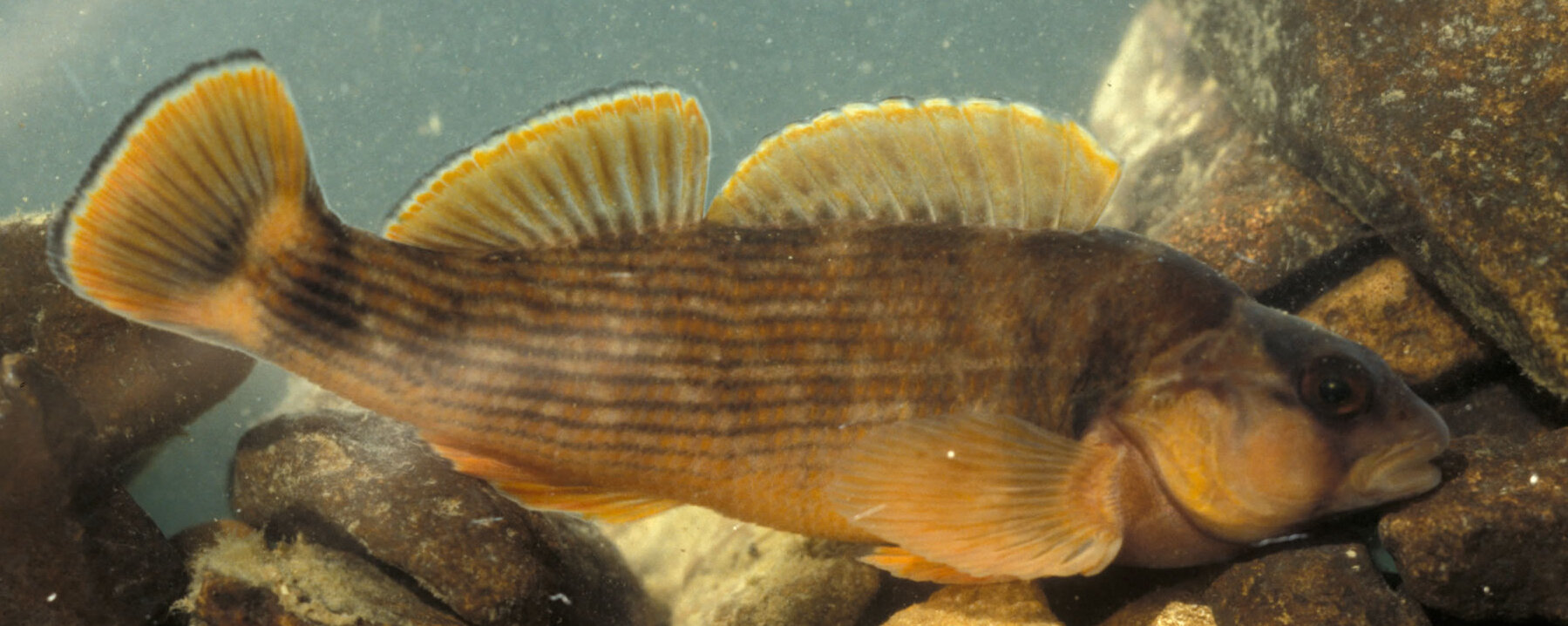
- N. bellus

Scientific classification
- Kingdom: Animalia
- Phylum: Chordata
- Class: Actinopterygii
- Order: Perciformes
- Family: Percidae
- Subfamily: Etheostomatinae
- Genus: Nothonotus; Putnam, 1863

Type species
- Etheostoma maculata Kirtland, 1840

= Nothonotus =

Genus of fishes

Nothonotus is a genus or subgenus of freshwater ray-finned fish, a darter from the subfamily Etheostomatinae, part of the family Percidae, which also contains the perches, ruffes and pikeperches. It is endemic to the southeastern United States. First proposed as a sub-genus of Etheostoma in 1988, there is still debate regarding the appropriate taxonomic rank of Nothonotus in the literature. Darter species comprise more than 180 of the Percidae taxa.

== Nothonotus species ==
Eschmeyer's Catalog of Fishes, as well as Thomas Near and colleagues, include the following species:

- Nothonotus acuticeps (R. M. Bailey, 1959) (sharphead darter)
- Nothonotus aquali (J. D. Williams & D. A. Etnier, 1978) (coppercheek darter)
- Nothonotus bellus (Zorach, 1968) (orangefin darter)
- Nothonotus camurus (Cope, 1870) (bluebreast darter)
- Nothonotus chlorobranchius (Zorach, 1972) (greenfin darter)
- Nothonotus chuckwachatte (Mayden & R. M. Wood, 1993) (lipstick darter)
- Nothonotus denoncourti (Stauffer & van Snik, 1997) (golden darter)
- Nothonotus douglasi (R. M. Wood & Mayden, 1993) (Tuskaloosa darter)
- Nothonotus etowahae (R. M. Wood & Mayden, 1993) (Etowah darter)
- Nothonotus jordani (Gilbert, 1891) (greenbreast darter)
- Nothonotus juliae (Meek, 1891) (yoke darter)
- Nothonotus maculatus (Kirtland, 1840) (spotted darter)
- Nothonotus microlepidus (Raney & Zorach, 1967) (smallscale darter)
- Nothonotus moorei (Raney & Suttkus, 1964) (yellowcheek darter)
- Nothonotus ruber (Note: as N. rubrus, an erroneous spelling) (Raney & Suttkus, 1966) (bayou darter)
- Nothonotus rufilineatus (Cope, 1870) (redline darter)
- Nothonotus sanguifluus (Cope, 1870) (bloodfin darter)
- Nothonotus starnesi Keck & Near, 2013 (Caney fork darter)
- Nothonotus tippecanoe (D. S. Jordan & Evermann, 1890) (Tippecanoe darter)
- Nothonotus vulneratus (Cope, 1870) (wounded darter)
- Nothonotus wapiti (D. A. Etnier & J. D. Williams, 1989) (boulder darter)

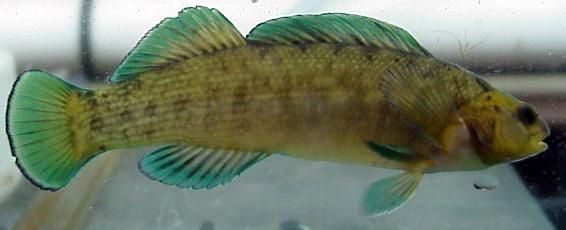
E. wapiti

FishBase only lists four species, the remainder being described and listed under Etheostoma.

== Phylogenetics ==
Members of Nothonotus last shared a common ancestor approximately 18.5 MYA. Frequent hybridization, the rich diversity of the subgenus, and the limitations of the fossil record complicate phylogenetic assessments, which have not been fully resolved. Various conflicting relationships have been proposed using morphological characters, allozyme analysis, microsatellites, and mtDNA sequencing.

== Life history ==
Nothonotus darters are native to the riffle domains of highly graded drainages in North America. Nothonotus species vary in locality preference, but are known to cooccur in several drainages in the Eastern United States. Nothonotus darters engage in three reproductive strategies: egg burial, egg guarding, and egg tending, strategies hypothesized to have evolved multiple times. Most species have limited mobility, moving approximately 33–100 meters per year. They are restricted to suitable breeding and feeding grounds, making novel niche exploration rare, particularly in fast flowing drainages. Low mobility is hypothesized to have facilitated speciation in regions where multiple species appear to have historical sympatric distributions. Various life history traits like body size determine the niche range available to a particular species. The biogeographic dispersal model has been proposed as the most likely explanation of diversification and speciation of the subgenera. It has also been postulated that speciation occurred following niche partitioning, in response to competition where distributions overlap.

== Anthropogenic influences and conservation implications ==
The low mobility and habitat specialization associated with the subgenus make Nothonotus species particularly sensitive to habitat degradation. Darter populations are frequently assessed as a proxy for stream habitat quality. In a comparative species richness survey, museum specimen from 1948–1955 contained approximately 33% more diversity than samples collected from 2005–2006 in the same localities despite more intensive sampling efforts in contemporary populations. The following Nothonotus species have been designated conservation statuses by IUCN redlist: Vulnerable : N. maculatum, N. acuticeps, N. denoncourti, N. etowahae, N. wapiti; Near threatened: N. aquali, N. tippecanoe; Endangered: N. moorei, N. ruber. Impoundment by dams and siltation restrict gene flow between previously continuous populations, threatening the genetic diversity of various Nothonotus species. Siltation has been cited as the most concerning mode of habitat destruction in aquatic habitats. Sediment issues occur when anthropogenic activities like mining, deforestation, urbanization, and road construction alter flow regimes and erosion rates. Genetic diversity assessments of Nothonotus populations are often conducted to determine the consequences of siltation on aquatic communities. Coloration, particularly conspicuous in males, is hypothesized to have evolved in response to sexual selection and habitat preference. Species residing higher in the water column, in clear water, and in habitats with low predation typically express stronger nuptial coloration patterns. Sedimentation may also interfere with mate identification due to reduced water clarity.
