= ACT River Basin =

Drainage basin (watershed) in the Southeastern US

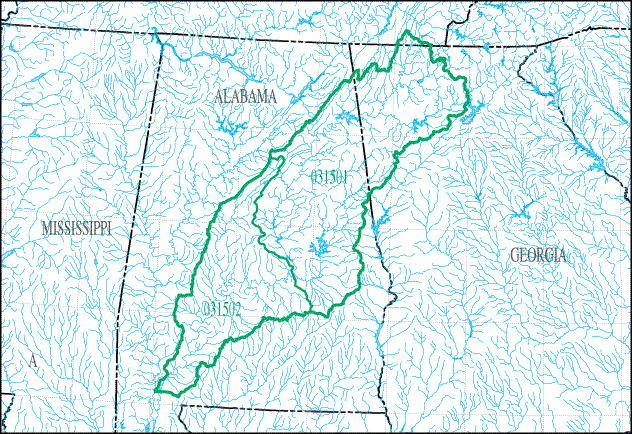
USGS map of the ACT River Basin

The Alabama-Coosa-Tallapoosa River Basin (ACT River Basin) is a drainage basin (watershed) in the Southeastern United States. The basin is located mainly in eastern Alabama, but also goes includes a small part of Georgia. This area is classified as a sub-region by the USGS hydrological code system.

== Overview ==
The main river of the Basin is the Tallapoosa which runs from Piedmont, Georgia to Montgomery, where it meets the Coosa to form the Alabama river. These three rivers and their tributaries form the basin. The basin is over 250 miles long and covers 4,675 square miles. Alabama Power Company operates all major hydroelectric dams on the Tallapoosa River including dams that form several reservoirs. These include Martin Dam, the dam that creates Lake Martin, a reservoir that contains 30% of the water in the basin.

Lake Martin, an "Alabama Treasured Lake", and Cane Creek, an "Outstanding Alabama Water". However, there are 37 waterbodies in the Tallapoosa Basin that are listed as impaired waters. Tallapoosa waterbody impairments include mercury due to atmospheric deposition, organic enrichment, siltation, and pathogen pollution due to fecal contamination.

The basin holds many endangered species including the Southern clubshell, and Finelined pocketbook. Fish species found in the Tallapoosa Basin include the lipstick darter, speckled darter, Tallapoosa darter, stippled studfish, Tallapoosa shiner, largemouth bass, redeye bass, and Alabama spotted bass.

== Sub-regions ==
The sub-region consists of two basins, per the hydrological code system, namely the Coosa-Tallapoosa basin, and the Alabama basin.

Further, here are the sub-basins of each of these two basins:

Coosa-Tallapoosa basin

- Conasauga sub-basin
- Coosawattee sub-basin
- Oostanaula sub-basin
- Etowah sub-basin
- Upper Coosa sub-basin
- Middle Coosa sub-basin
- Lower Coosa sub-basin
- Upper Tallapoosa sub-basin
- Middle Tallapoosa sub-basin
- Lower Tallapoosa sub-basin

Alabama basin

- Upper Alabama sub-basin
- Cahaba sub-basin
- Middle Alabama sub-basin
- Lower Alabama sub-basin
