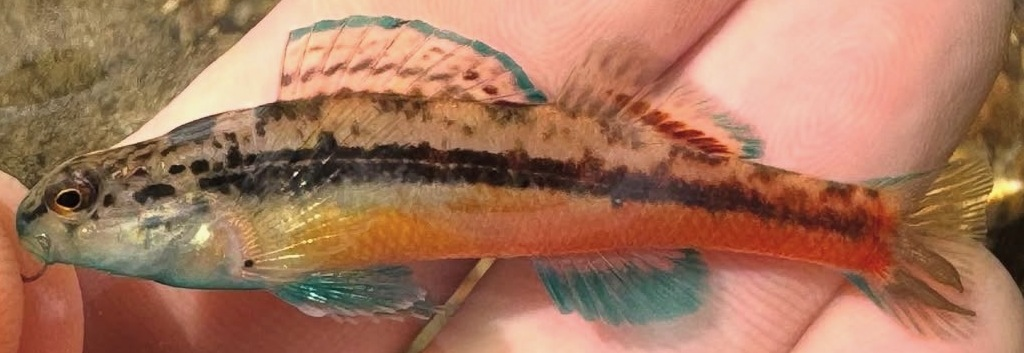

Scientific classification
- Kingdom: Animalia
- Phylum: Chordata
- Class: Actinopterygii
- Division: Teleostei
- Order: Perciformes
- Family: Percidae
- Genus: Etheostoma
- Species: E. cyanoprosopum

Binomial name
- Etheostoma cyanoprosopum Near & Kozal, 2017

= Blueface darter =

Species of fish

The blueface darter, Etheostoma cyanoprosopum, is a species of freshwater fish in the family Percidae and a member of the group commonly known as darters. It exhibits microendemism as it is only found in 12.5 miles of stream in northern Alabama.

== Taxonomy ==
The blueface darter was formally described as a distinct species in 2017, splitting from the bandfin darter (Etheostoma zonistium) species complex, a group of closely related taxa with similar morphology but distinct genetic markers. Taxonomic revision was supported by differences in genetic and morphological characteristics, as well as geographic isolation, further justifying its recognition as a new species.

Molecular evidence indicates that the blueface darter split from its relative species, approximately 2.9 million years ago during the late Pliocene. This split mirrors historical geological and hydrological processes, such as stream capture events within the Cumberland Plateau region, which led to long-term isolation between populations. Over time, this isolation further promoted genetic differences and the emergence of distinct morphological traits, ultimately resulting in speciation.

== Morphology ==
The blueface darter is characterized as a small, benthic freshwater fish, with adult individuals typically reaching a maximum length of 4.9 cm (1.9 in). It exhibits an elongate, laterally compressed body, characteristic of most members of the genus Etheostoma.

It typically possesses anywhere from 9-12 dorsal spines and 10-12 dorsal soft rays. The anal fin contains 2 spines and 7-9 soft rays, while the pectoral fins have 14 rays. The lateral line is complete, with 45-53 scales, accompanied by 11-17 transverse scale rows and 16-20 scales on the caudal peduncle.

The body is elongated, with the nape, belly, and area anterior to the pectoral fins being scaled (cycloid), while the breast typically lacks scales altogether. The species exhibits dark markings along the sides and 8-10 dorsal saddles, which provide camouflage against the rocky substrates of its habitat.

Coloration is especially pronounced in spawning males. The spiny dorsal fin displays three prominent colors: a distal turquoise band, a medial red band, and a band of black spots. The second dorsal fin exhibits a subtle blue highlight and a deep red band along the posterior half of the fin. During the spawning season, males also display blue pigmentation along their pelvic, caudal, and anal fins. Reflected in the common name, males exhibit blue coloration across the breast and extending onto the face, snout, and cheeks.

Females are typically more drab in coloration and lack the vivid blues and reds seen in nuptial males. Instead, they are typically tan to light brown or olive and may exhibit a mottled appearance.

== Life history ==
Due to this species being formally recognized as a species in 2017, we have limited knowledge of their life history characteristics. In general, most darters reach sexual maturity around ages 1-2 and typically live around 3-4 years. Most darters grow about 2-3 inches, some species like the logperch can reach to 7 inches in length. Blueface darters may exhibit a shorter life and reproductive span due to their small size and may not have as great of reproductive success as other widespread darters due to their limited distribution.

The blueface darter is a short-lived, benthic fish that exhibits sexual dimorphism and doesn't possess a swim bladder.

Blueface darters can be referred to as "easter eggers" due to their unique reproductive strategy. This style of reproduction involves scattering eggs across hard surfaces from rocks to submerged logs, which creates adaptability among their habitats. During their development, the larvae have adapted to resist being washed out of their systems by heavy rain, this trait ensures the survivability of the next generation in their environment.

== Habitat and geographic distribution ==
The blueface darter is restricted to the Bear Creek system of the Tennessee River drainage and the Hubbard Creek system of the Black Warrior River drainage in northwestern Alabama. Together these populations occupy approximately 12.5 miles of stream habitat. The species is geographically isolated from it sister species, the bandfin darter, Etheostoma zonistium, by approximately 46 river miles across the Cumberland Plateau.

Like most darter species, the species inhabits shallow, fast-moving riffles and runs in cool, clear headwater streams with substrate dominated by cobble and gravel. They are a benthic dwelling species, and are often observed occupying interstitial spaces among rocks. Spawning habitat preferences include small to medium- sized well oxygenated streams, where eggs are deposited on hard substrates such as cobble and woody debris.

== Conservation status ==
The blueface darter is not currently listed under the Endangered Species Act or the IUCN Red List, most likely due to its recent formal recognition in 2017, and the fact that it has not yet undergone a formal review by the USFWS. The species does experience microendemism, and geographic isolation, which may result in limited genetic diversity thus potentially leading to population declines.

However, the species is recognized as threatened by the American Fisheries Society, but this designation provides limited conservation resources and is more symbolic in nature. Primary threats include habitat alteration, fragmentation, and water quality degradation. Anthropogenic disturbances, such as the construction of the Upper Bear Creek Reservoir in 1978, have resulted in the local decline of populations downstream of the dam. In addition, invasive species, such as the weed shiner, Alburnops texanus, have contributed to declines in some isolated populations.

Due to its limited geographic range and potential for genetic bottlenecking, the species is particularly vulnerable to both stochastic events and ongoing anthropogenic pressures.

== Etymology ==
The genus name, Etheostoma, is derived from the Greek etheo, meaning "to strain" or "filter", and stoma, meaning "mouth", likely referring to the species' behavior of straining water through its mouth while foraging. The species name, cyanoprosopum, refers to its distinctive blue head, from cyano meaning "blue" and prosopos meaning "face".
