= Golden darter =

Conservation status
- Vulnerable (IUCN 3.1)

Scientific classification
- Kingdom: Animalia
- Phylum: Chordata
- Class: Actinopterygii
- Order: Perciformes
- Family: Percidae
- Genus: Etheostoma
- Species: E. denoncourti

Binomial name
- Etheostoma denoncourti Stauffer & van Snik, 1997

Species of fish

The golden darter (Etheostoma denoncourti) is a species of freshwater ray-finned fish, a darter from the subfamily Etheostomatinae, part of the family Percidae, which also contains the perches, ruffes and pikeperches. It is found in the upper Tennessee River, one of the over 300 fish species found in Tennessee.

== Identification ==
This species is similar to the Tippecanoe darter but has scales on cheek behind the eye, 2nd dorsal under the 1st dorsal fin. The golden darter has a gold margin to the 1st dorsal fin and the body is orange in color marked with vertical dark bars towards the tail.

== Range ==
The golden darter is extremely localized. It can be found in the Tennessee River drainage, Virginia, and Tennessee. The species occurs in not more than 10 locations, and habitat quality is subject to ongoing declines. This darter is restricted to the Tennessee River drainage in Tennessee and Virginia. It has been collected from Copper Creek and the Clinch, Sequatchie, Duck, and Buffalo rivers.

== Habitat and biology ==
The golden darter prefers shallow gravel riffles in small to medium-sized rivers. It is thought to be a species in which the eggs are buried in the substrate.

== Taxonomy and etymology ==
The golden darter was first formally described in 1997 by Jay Richard Stauffer, Jr. and Ellen S. van Snik Gray with the type locality given as Copper Creek, 180–460 meters upstream from its mouth on Virginia State Route 627, 2 kilometres (1.2 miles) south of Clinchport, Virginia. Previously these fish were considered to be the upper Tennessee River population of the Tippecanoe darter (E. tippiecanoe) but were found to differ in meristics and coloration. The specific name honours Robert F. Denoncourt who introduced Stauffer to the "diversity and complexity of the stream fishes in the southern Appalachian drainage".
