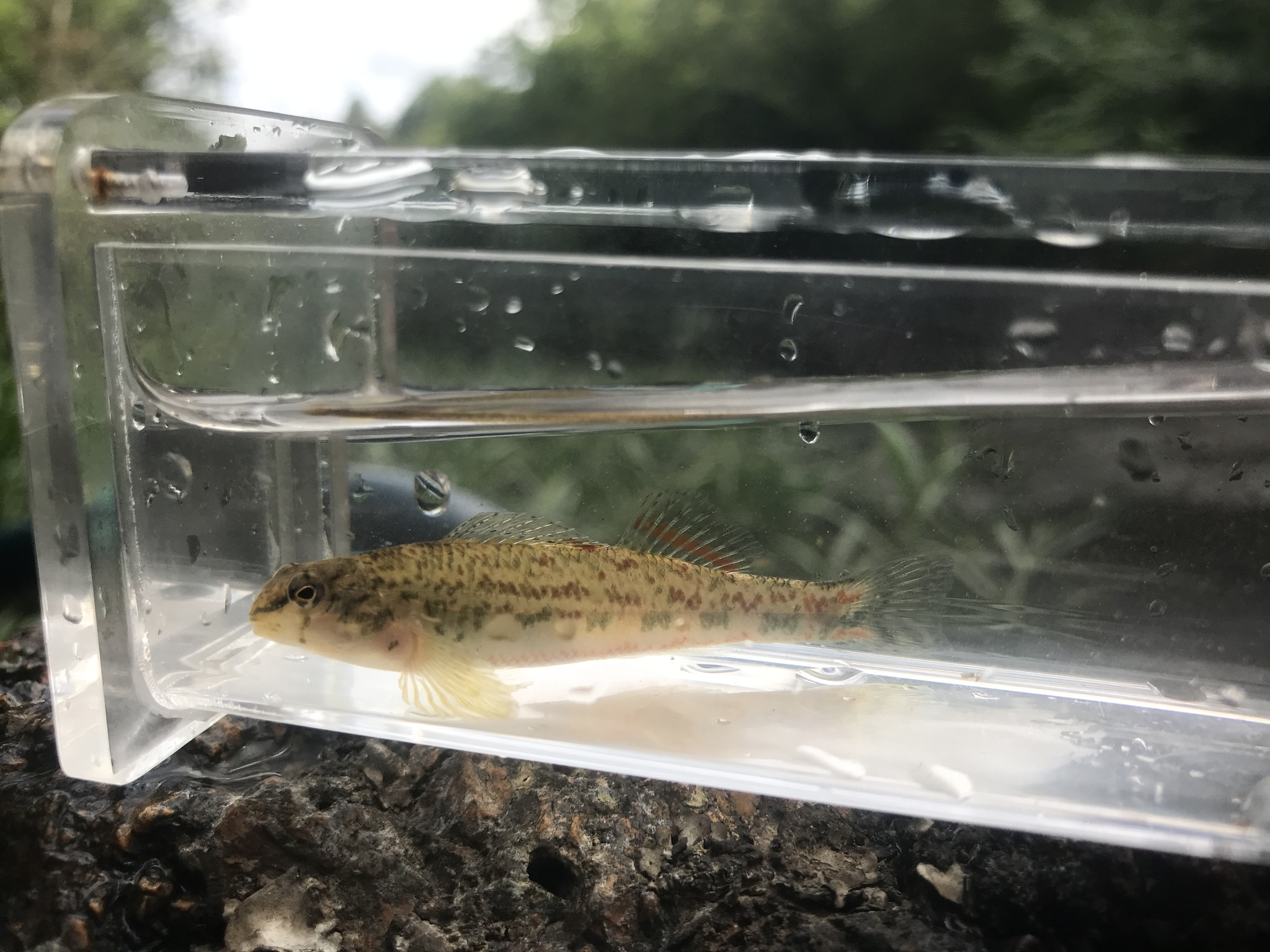

Conservation status
- Least Concern (IUCN 3.1)

Scientific classification
- Kingdom: Animalia
- Phylum: Chordata
- Class: Actinopterygii
- Division: Teleostei
- Order: Perciformes
- Family: Percidae
- Genus: Etheostoma
- Species: E. ramseyi

Binomial name
- Etheostoma ramseyi Suttkus & R. M. Bailey, 1994

= Alabama darter =

Species of fish

The Alabama darter (Etheostoma ramseyi) is a species of freshwater ray-finned fish, a darter from the subfamily Etheostomatinae, part of the family Percidae, which also contains the perches, ruffes and pikeperches. The species is endemic to the eastern United States, where it occurs mostly below the fall line of the Alabama River drainage. It is also relatively common in headwater tributaries to the Cahaba River above the fall line.

The Alabama darter was first formally described in 1994 by Royal Dallas Suttkus and Reeve Maclaren Bailey with the type locality given as Beaver Creek, a tributary of the Alabama River in Wilcox County, Alabama. The specific name honors the American ichthyologist John S. Ramsey.
