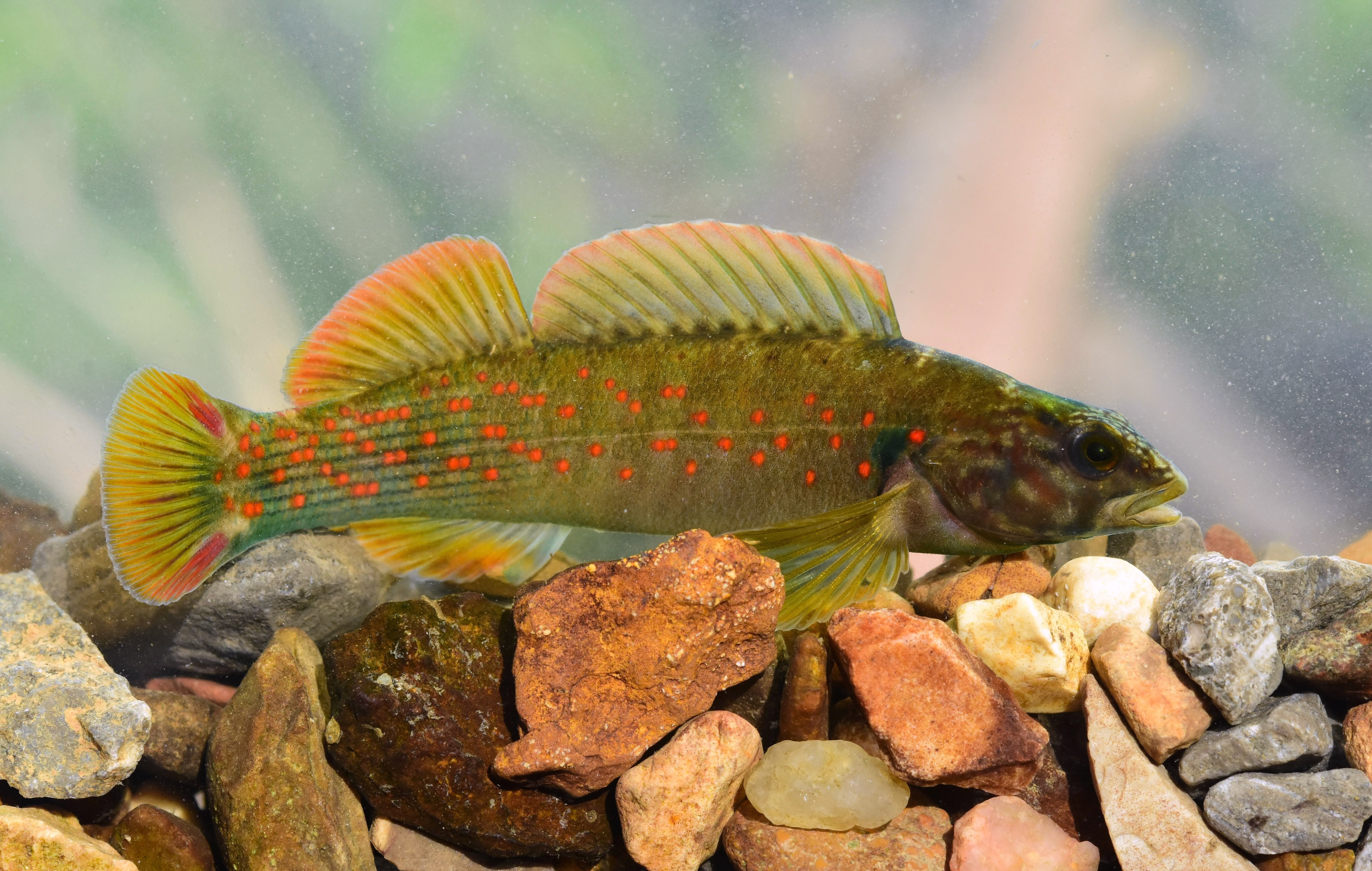

Scientific classification
- Kingdom: Animalia
- Phylum: Chordata
- Class: Actinopterygii
- Order: Perciformes
- Family: Percidae
- Genus: Nothonotus
- Species: N. starnesi

Binomial name
- Nothonotus starnesi Keck & Near, 2013

Synonyms
- Etheostoma starnesi (Neck & Kear, 2013)

= Nothonotus starnesi =

Species of fish

Nothonotus starnesi, the Caney Fork darter, is a species of freshwater ray-finned fish, a darter from the subfamily Etheostomatinae, part of the family Percidae, which also contains the perches, ruffes and pikeperches. It is endemic to Caney Creek in Tennessee. This species is found in small rivers where there are riffles with clear water and a gravel substrate. Its specific name honours the American ichthyologist Wayne C. Starnes of the North Carolina Museum of Natural Sciences.
