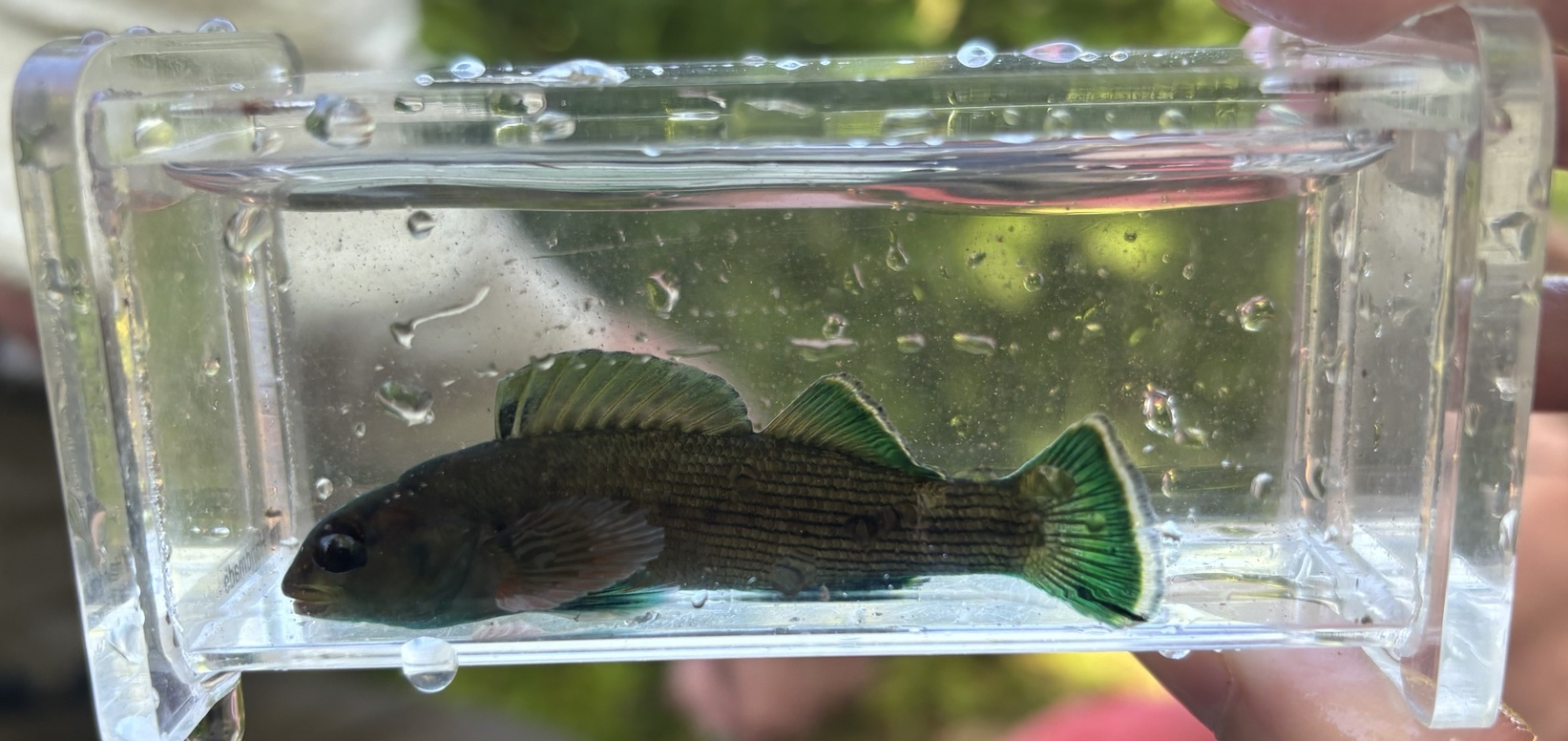

Conservation status
- Least Concern (IUCN 3.1)

Scientific classification
- Kingdom: Animalia
- Phylum: Chordata
- Class: Actinopterygii
- Order: Perciformes
- Family: Percidae
- Genus: Nothonotus
- Species: N. chlorobranchius

Binomial name
- Nothonotus chlorobranchius (Zorach, 1972)

Synonyms
- Etheostoma chlorobranchium

= Greenfin darter =

Species of fish

The greenfin darter (Nothonotus chlorobranchius) is a species of freshwater ray-finned fish, a darter from the subfamily Etheostomatinae, part of the family Percidae, which also contains the perches, ruffes and pikeperches. It is endemic to the eastern United States.

== Geographic distribution ==
The greenfin darter is primarily restricted to the fast-flowing, mountainous streams and rivers of the upper Tennessee River drainage area, in North Carolina, Georgia, and Tennessee. The species' range stretches from the upper Holston and Watauga Rivers, south through the French Broad and Little Tennessee Rivers, and ultimately ends at the Hiwassee River.

== Ecology ==
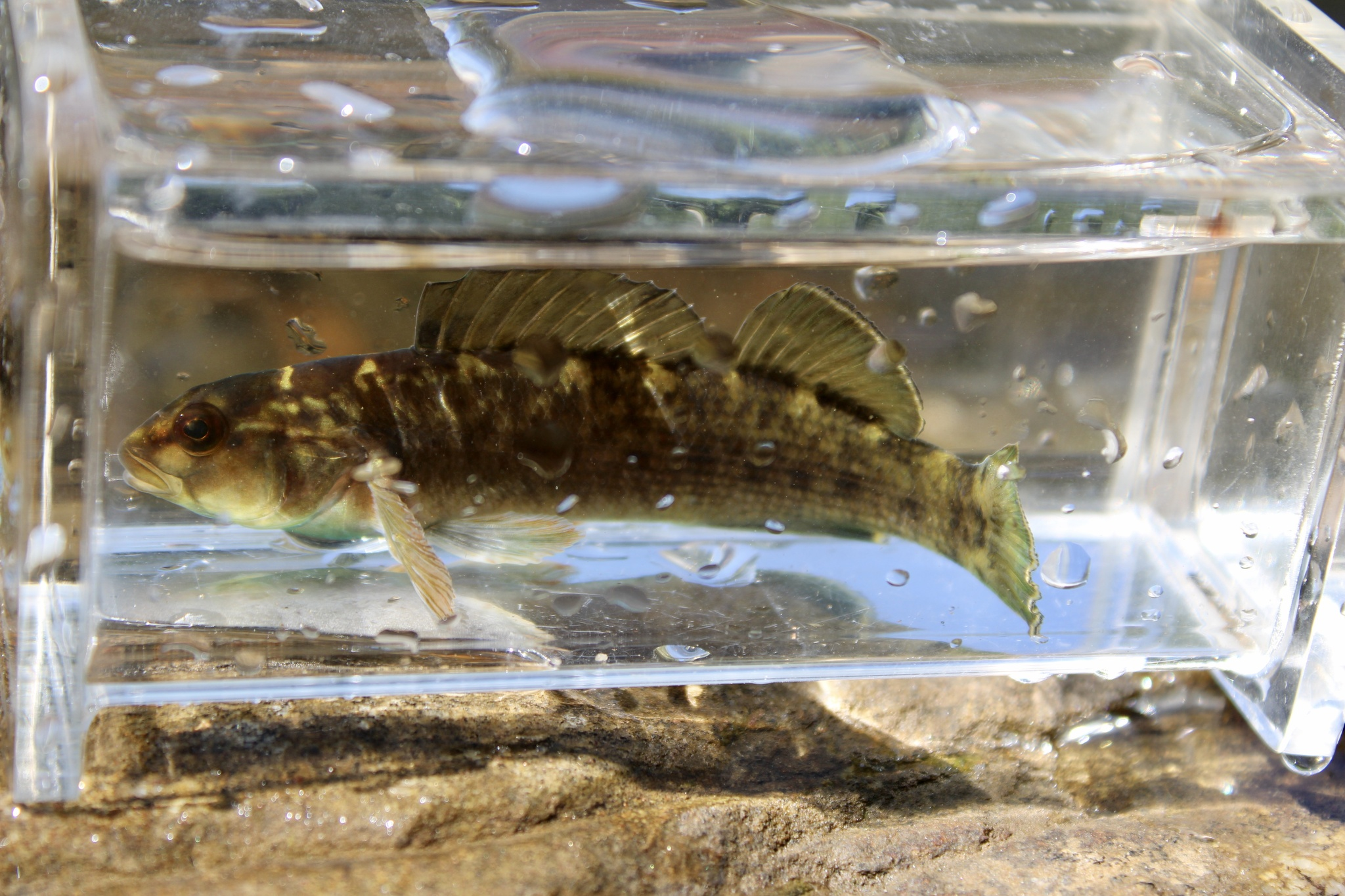
North Carolina

The greenfin darter is a benthic insectivore, feeding mainly on insect larvae in cold, high-elevation creeks and rivers. A study by Bryant et al. revealed the diet of the greenfin darter may be the most diverse in the genus, with some individuals' guts containing up to 15 different species of insects. Its predators are mainly larger freshwater fish, such as smallmouth bass (Micropterus dolomieu) and madtoms (genus Noturus). Darters in general are important food sources for many fish. Freshwater eels commonly consume adult darters, and suckerfish prey on their eggs. The species is relatively abundant, and has been found to hybridize with N. camurus and N. rufilineatus, where ranges overlap. Like many other darter species, the greenfin has adapted morphologically to reduce drag and allow stationary positioning on the substrate even in the midst of fast-flowing riffles.

== Life cycle ==
Spawning occurs from late May to early August. Females bury themselves in the substrate in areas protected from strong currents, and release eggs upon the arrival of a mate. The male may remain at the spawning site for several hours, guarding the eggs. Growth is extremely rapid, with juveniles reaching 45 mm (1.8 in) in just a year. Mean length is 62 mm (2.4 in), with some individuals reaching as much as 110 mm (4.3 in). Lifespans can be up to five years. N. chlorobranchius is thought to be the largest species in Nothonotus.

== Environmental status ==
N. chlorobranchius has been evaluated by the IUCN as a Least Concern species, although it is classified as state threatened in Georgia. However, the species is found and protected in the Great Smoky Mountains National Park and the Southern Appalachian Biosphere reserve. Greenfin populations are certainly vulnerable to siltation, water impoundment (or any change to water velocity), and agricultural runoff. A close relative, N. camurus, has seen huge population declines due to anthropogenic environmental disturbances, and is listed as critically imperiled in several states. Hybridization between N. chlorobranchius, N. camurus, and N. rufilineatus does not appear to be a threat to the species. Additionally, climate change may force the greenfin into higher elevations, and into smaller streams. This will almost certainly lead to population declines. Because of its position as an important food source for larger fish in the Tennessee River drainage area, it is important for this species to be assessed and monitored in the future.
