= Smallscale darter =

Conservation status
- Near Threatened (IUCN 3.1)

Scientific classification
- Kingdom: Animalia
- Phylum: Chordata
- Class: Actinopterygii
- Order: Perciformes
- Family: Percidae
- Genus: Nothonotus
- Species: N. microlepidus

Binomial name
- Nothonotus microlepidus (Raney & Zorach, 1967)

Synonyms
- Etheostoma microlepidum Raney & Zorach, 1967

Species of fish

Nothonotus microlepidus, the smallscale darter, is a species of freshwater ray-finned fish, a darter from the subfamily Etheostomatinae, part of the family Percidae, which also contains the perches, ruffes and pikeperches. It is endemic to the southeastern United States. It occurs in the lower Cumberland River drainage in the states of Kentucky and Tennessee. It inhabits shallow riffles with gravel substrates in small rivers. Breeding habits of the smallscale darter are typical of the N. maculatus group in that females deposit large masses of eggs on the undersides of rocks to be protected by the males. This species is a fairly large, deep-bodied fish with dark background coloration mixed with bright red spots scattered alongside the body. Nuptial males of this species also have deep green fins with orange margins on the spinous dorsal and caudal fins, with the soft dorsal fins having a dark coloration moving marginally to yellow-orangish center with black margins. This species can reach a length of 7.2 centimetres (2.8 in) TL though most only reach about 4.8 centimetres (1.9 in).

In 2011, the status of this fish was upgraded to State Endangered for Kentucky. Recent surveys within the Little River revealed only five localities where this species occurs.
