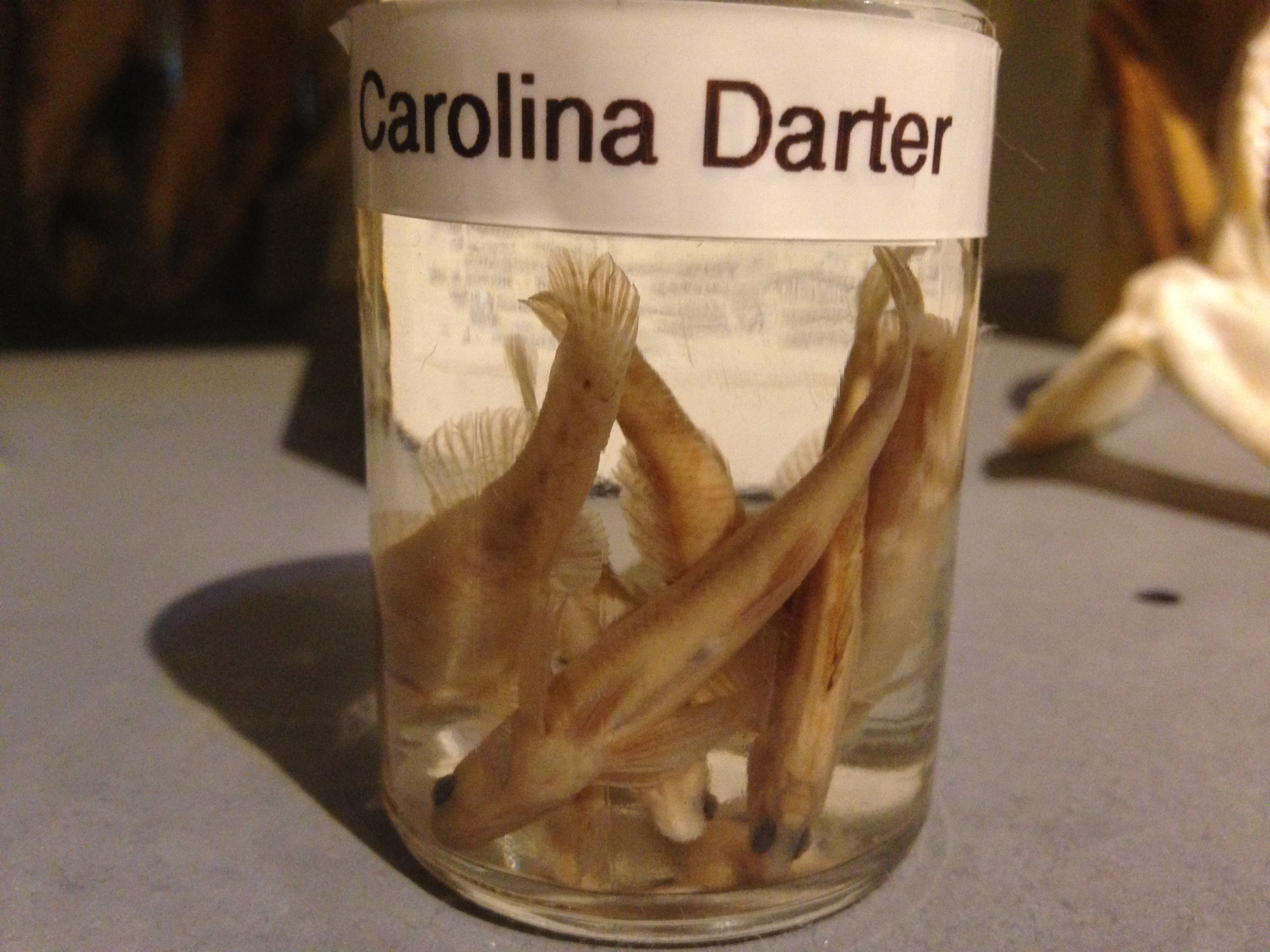
- Preserved specimens at the North Carolina Museum of Natural Sciences.

Conservation status
- Least Concern (IUCN 3.1)

- Vulnerable (NatureServe)

Scientific classification
- Kingdom: Animalia
- Phylum: Chordata
- Class: Actinopterygii
- Division: Teleostei
- Order: Perciformes
- Family: Percidae
- Genus: Etheostoma
- Species: E. collis

Binomial name
- Etheostoma collis (Hubbs & Cannon, 1935)

Synonyms
- Hololepis collis Hubbs & Cannon, 1935; Etheostoma collis lepidinion Collette, 1962; Etheostoma saludae (Hubbs & Cannon, 1935)

= Carolina darter =

Species of fish

The Carolina darter (Etheostoma collis) is a species of freshwater ray-finned fish, a darter from the subfamily Etheostomatinae, part of the family Percidae, which also contains the perches, ruffes and pikeperches. It is endemic to the eastern United States, where it occurs in the Atlantic Piedmont from Roanoke River drainage of Virginia to Santee River drainage of South Carolina. It inhabits muddy and rocky pools and backwaters of sluggish headwaters and creeks. This species can reach a length of 6 cm (2.4 in). The Carolina darter was first formally described in 1935 as Hololepis collis by the American ichthyologists Carl Leavitt Hubbs (1894–1979) and Mott Dwight Cannon with the type locality given as a creek near York, South Carolina.
