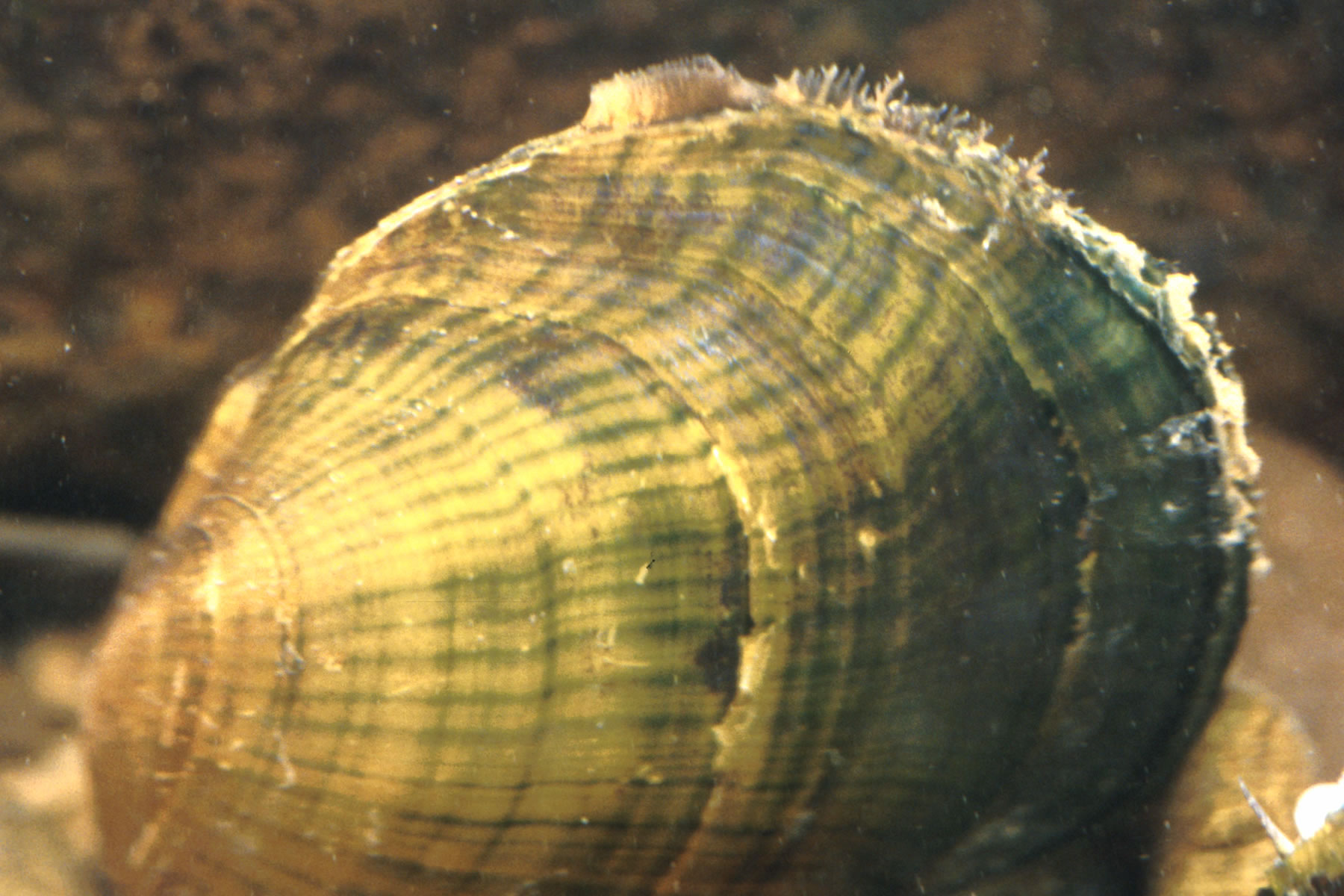

Conservation status
- Endangered (IUCN 3.1)

- Endangered (ESA)

Scientific classification
- Kingdom: Animalia
- Phylum: Mollusca
- Class: Bivalvia
- Order: Unionida
- Family: Unionidae
- Genus: Epioblasma
- Species: E. capsaeformis

Binomial name
- Epioblasma capsaeformis (I. Lea, 1834)

Synonyms
- Dysnomia capsaeformis I. Lea, 1834

= Oyster mussel =

Species of bivalve

The oyster mussel (Epioblasma capsaeformis) is a rare species of freshwater mussel in the family Unionidae. This aquatic bivalve mollusk is native to the Cumberland and Tennessee River systems of Kentucky, Tennessee, Alabama, and Virginia in the United States. It has been extirpated from the states of Georgia and North Carolina. It is a federally listed endangered species of the United States.

This mussel was once widely distributed and common. It has declined 80% from its historical abundance. It is now extirpated from the Cumberland River system and the main artery of the Tennessee River. It remains in the Nolichucky River of Tennessee and the Clinch River in Tennessee and Virginia. Specimens once classified as this species that remain in the Duck River in Tennessee have now been classified as a separate species, Epioblasma ahlstedti.

This mussel is elliptical or obovate in shape and reaches a maximum length of 70 mm. The posterior end of males protrudes slightly, while females are more rounded. The periostracum is sunshiny, yellowish green, with green rays over the entire shell. The nacre color is bluish-white to creamy.

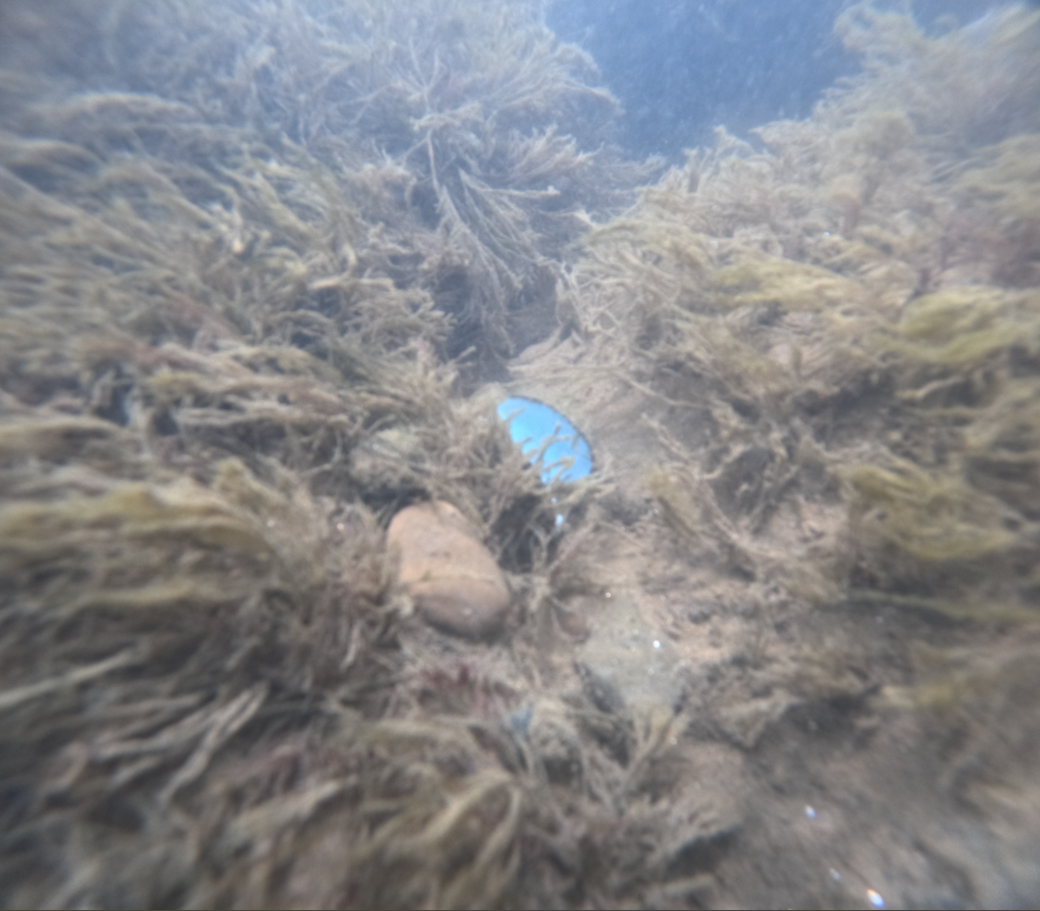
A gravid female oyster mussel in the Nolichucky River in eastern Tennessee displays a vivid blue lure to attract fish into whose gills she will release her parasitic larvae.

Like other freshwater mussels, this species is reproduces by releasing its larvae, termed glochidia, which lodge in the gills of fish to develop into juvenile mussels. Host fish species for this mussel include the wounded darter (Etheostoma vulneratum), redline darter (E. rufilineatum), bluebreast darter (Etheostoma camarum), dusky darter (Percina sciera), banded sculpin (Cottus carolinae), black sculpin (Cottus baileyi), and mottled sculpin (Cottus bairdi). This mussel is known as a long term brooder, or bradytictic, meaning it spawns in late summer or fall and releases its larvae in early spring.

The main threat to this species is habitat alteration such as channelization and impoundments of waterways, increased silt, and pollution.

This mussel is propagated in captivity. Many juveniles have been released into appropriate habitat.
