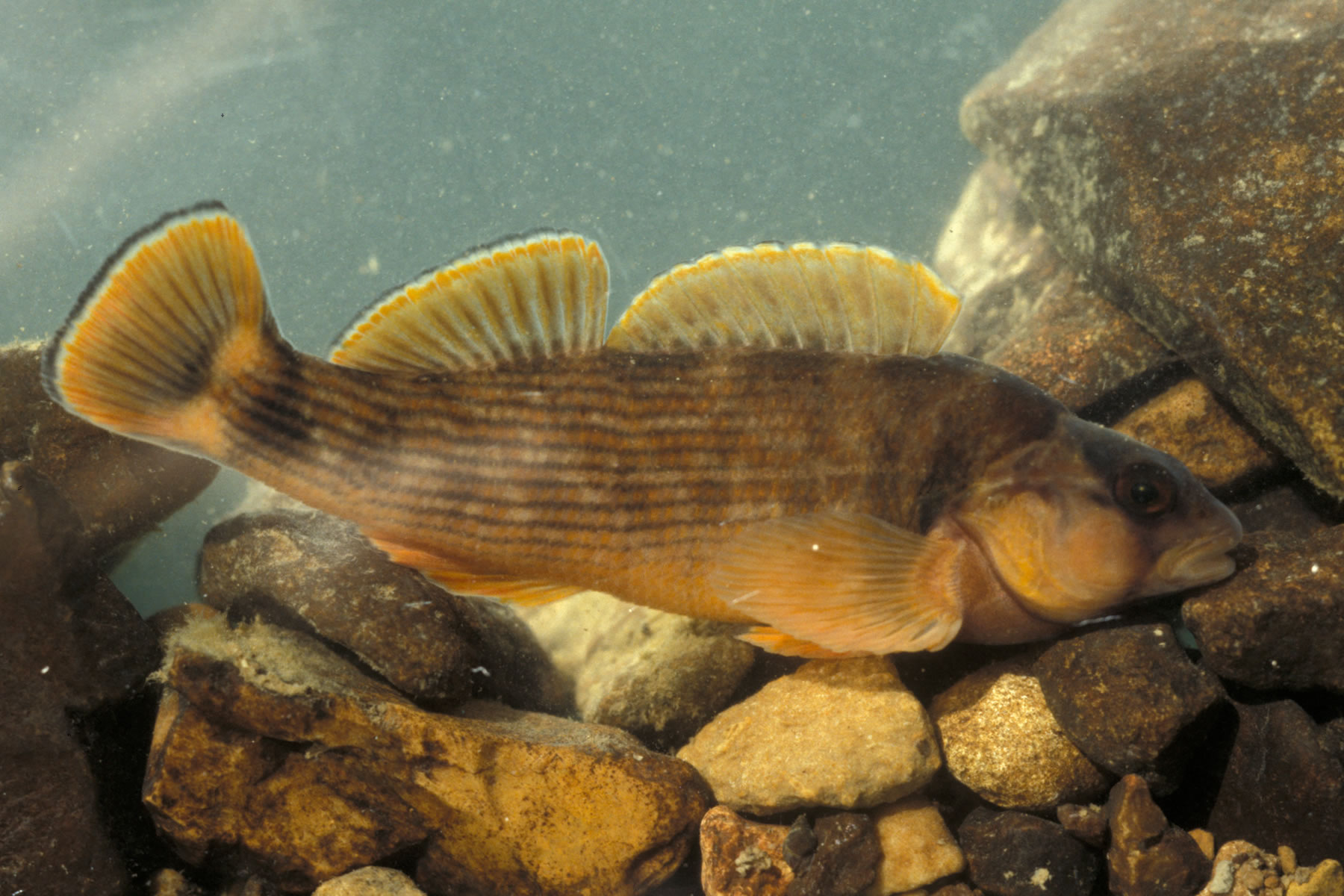

Conservation status
- Least Concern (IUCN 3.1)

Scientific classification
- Kingdom: Animalia
- Phylum: Chordata
- Class: Actinopterygii
- Order: Perciformes
- Family: Percidae
- Genus: Etheostoma
- Species: E. bellum

Binomial name
- Etheostoma bellum Zorach, 1968

= Orangefin darter =

Species of fish

The orangefin darter (Etheostoma bellum) is a species of freshwater ray-finned fish, a darter from the subfamily Etheostomatinae, part of the family Percidae, which also contains the perches, ruffes and pikeperches. It is found in Barren River and Green River systems in Tennessee and Kentucky.

This moderate-sized fish usually matures between one and two years of age. The territorial males spawn over the top of buried females in the gravels of fast-flowing riffle areas. This usually occurs from late April to late June. Both the juveniles and adults are vicious predators, and mainly like to feed on dipteran larvae.

== Distribution ==
These darters are known only from the Green and Barren River watersheds. The Green River is the largest river of the two, and the Barren River is a tributary to the Green River, which is known for a "biodiversity hotspot." This river's hotspot is considered to be between the 100-mile stretch from Green River reservoir dam and Mammoth Cave National Park. More than 150 fish species and 70 mussels have been found in this system, and many other aquatic species. This river drains to the Mississippi, but the orangefin darters do not go that far down the system. Green River is a flowing system with many waterfalls, and mountain springs flowing into it to give a clean green look because of the depth. The Barren River headwaters are more in Tennessee, but flows in Kentucky, also. The Barren River is north of the Nashville Basin, in Clay, Macon, and Sumner Counties, draining the northward-sloping portion of the Highland Rim. It meets the Green River around Warren County, Kentucky. "A typical Highland Rim stream is cool, clear water, gravel substrates, and riffle pool habitats."

== Ecology ==
The upper Green River system was studied, and six endemic darter species were analyzed. Over 300 sites were examined during a 13-year period with five classes in the landscape map: agriculture, forest, water, and developed/exposed. "Orangefin darter was detected at 46% of the sample sites and occupies portions of all major river systems in the watershed." This darter occurred more often than the other five darter species, but it was mostly around forest-covered areas or below large reservoirs. It also was found around fine-loamy soils that had good water velocity, and averaging low 50-degrees temperatures. This species needs the right living environment to feed and spawn, but in these living areas are predators, and competition occurs. Larger freshwater fish prey on darters, such as catfish and smallmouth bass. Intraspecific competition occurs because small invertebrates are more abundant during different times of the year, and breeding areas become a challenge, also. Darters tend to feed on small fish larvae, which adds more competition within the species. Interspecific competition can be caused by abundance of predators, or human impacts on the environment. Increasing agriculture and deforestation, or sending more pollution down the stream, can reduce the abundance of this species. The building of dams can slow the flow of water, which will have a major effect on the orangefin because they use rocky substrates and swift-moving riffles for hiding and feeding. Their ecosystem must stay balanced in the future, or stress on these endemic species can cause extinction sooner.

== Life history ==
N. bellus is a moderate-sized darter of the subgenus Nothonotus, endemic to the Green and Barren River system in south-central Kentucky and north-central Tennessee. "Spawning was from late April to late June in gravel substrates of fast flowing riffles." Darters mostly inhabit somewhat deeper water until the spawning period begins, and they become more aggressive with the warmer waters. During this period, they move to better-flowing waters with riffles and rocks. When breeding starts, the territorial males, or larger mature males attract the females to come spawn. Coloration in the males is a big part also in breeding, and the "females prefer conspecific over heterospecific coloration, and prefer a particular color variant within species." When the female picks the right male, she buries herself in the substrate on his territory. The male lies parallel with her where he ejects his sperm into the substrate, so it can meet with the eggs she has laid. They lay clusters of eggs, around 60–100, but only so many will hatch within 7–9 days in 23 °C water. The male guards the nest for a few days, but finally leaves, and the eggs that hatch are on their own. Maturity is reached in a year to two, and males seem to mature sooner, and their lifespan is about five years. Their diet is mostly hydracarinads, ephemeropteran nymphs, and dipteran larvae, but it changes some depending on the time of year. They also reached their feeding peak during the afternoon, and juveniles and adults mostly fed on the same food types. Usually, the juveniles stay in the shallow waters for a while, and the adults went back to deeper waters after breeding.

== Taxonomy ==
The orangefin darter was first formally described in 1968 by Timothy Zorach with the type locality given as White Oak Creek, at a bridge between White Oak and Galen, 1.2 miles northwest of Galen in Macon County, Tennessee. Zorach initially placed it in the subgenus Nothonotus but Fishbase classifies it within the genus Etheostoma while recognising 4 species within a valid genus Nothonotus.

== Management ==
Though the orangefin darter has a small range, it is listed by the IUCN as least concern "in view of the large number of subpopulations, large population size, apparently stable trend, and lack of major threats". The Nature Conservancy operates a conservation project in the Green River, which is inhabited by the orangefin darter.
