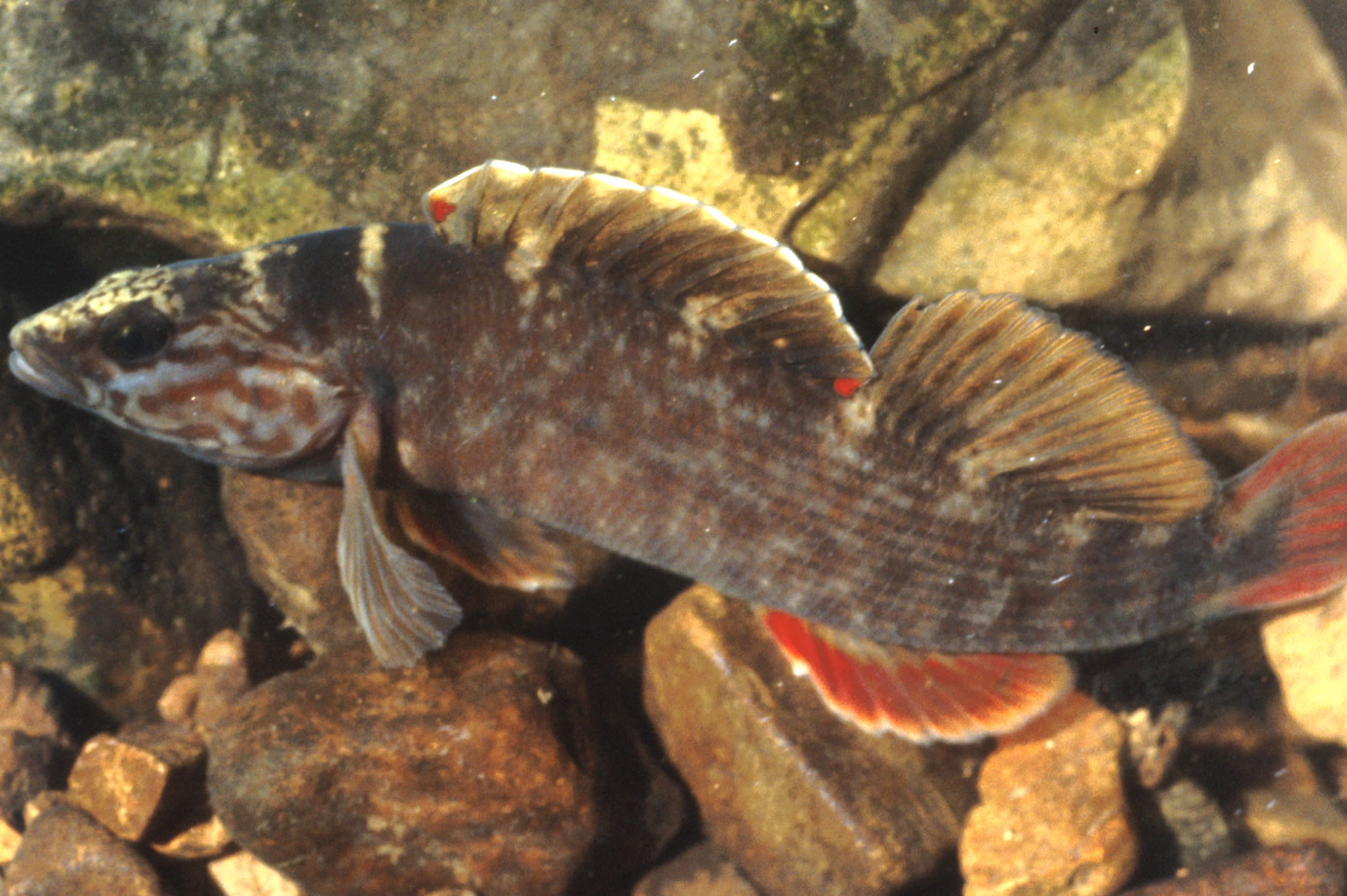

Conservation status
- Near Threatened (IUCN 3.1)

Scientific classification
- Kingdom: Animalia
- Phylum: Chordata
- Class: Actinopterygii
- Order: Perciformes
- Family: Percidae
- Genus: Nothonotus
- Species: N. aquali

Binomial name
- Nothonotus aquali (J. D. Williams & Etnier, 1978)

Synonyms
- Etheostoma aquali J. D. Williams & Etnier, 1978

= Coppercheek darter =

Species of fish

The coppercheek darter (Nothonotus aquali) is a species of freshwater ray-finned fish, a darter from the subfamily Etheostomatinae, part of the family Percidae, which also contains the perches, ruffes and pikeperches. It is endemic to the southeastern United States. It is only known from the Duck River system of Tennessee. It is an inhabitant of small and medium rivers where it occurs in rocky riffles with clear, fast-flowing water. It preys on insect larvae and other immature stages and is also known to consume snails. This species can reach a length of 8 cm (3.1 in), though most only reach about 5.6 cm (2.2 in).
