= Bloodfin darter =

Conservation status
- Least Concern (IUCN 3.1)

Scientific classification
- Kingdom: Animalia
- Phylum: Chordata
- Class: Actinopterygii
- Order: Perciformes
- Family: Percidae
- Genus: Nothonotus
- Species: N. sanguifluus

Binomial name
- Nothonotus sanguifluus Cope, 1870

Synonyms
- Etheostoma sanguifluum (Cope, 1870)

Species of fish

The bloodfin darter (Nothonotus sanguifluus) is a species of freshwater ray-finned fish, a darter from the subfamily Etheostomatinae, part of the family Percidae, which also contains the perches, ruffes and pikeperches. It is endemic to the southeastern United States.

== Geographic distribution ==
The bloodfin darter occupies small to medium streams on the Cumberland Plateau in and around the Big South Fork. The range of the species is small and patchy and the effects of human expansion are not fully known at this time. Currently, the bloodfin darter occurs in the same streams and river that it has historically. Human expansion may pose a problem for this species, but the effects are not yet known.

== Ecology ==
The bloodfin darter is an invertivore (feeds on invertebrates) in both the adult and juvenile forms and prefers high gradient, medium river, moderate gradient, riffle. The bloodfin darter prefers high to moderate gradient streams that are in the higher elevations of the Cumberland Plateau. The bloodfin dater also needs rocky/gravel bottoms to spawn where the eggs are deposited in between crevices in the rocks.

== Life history ==
The bloodfin darter reaches a maximum length of 9.0 centimeters (3.5 in) and the species breeds in rocky shoals. The bloodfin darter lays eggs in or under rocks that are near fast moving water or riffles of small to medium rivers and streams. The bloodfin darter breeds once per year in the spring. The species lays 20 eggs per mating event and eggs were clumped together; larvae were phototactic and pelagic for 5–21 days before becoming benthic. Fish that are phototactic move towards the light and fish that are pelagic are in open water. Fish that are benthic inhabit the bottom portions of the water column in the habitat that species is in.

== Management ==
Somewhat small extent of occurrence, but listed as Least Concern in view of the fairly large number of subpopulations, lack of evidence of a substantial decline, and apparent lack of major threats.
