= Wounded darter =

Conservation status
- Least Concern (IUCN 3.1)

Scientific classification
- Kingdom: Animalia
- Phylum: Chordata
- Class: Actinopterygii
- Order: Perciformes
- Family: Percidae
- Genus: Etheostoma
- Species: E. vulneratum

Binomial name
- Etheostoma vulneratum (Cope, 1870)

Synonyms
- Poecilichthys vulneratus Cope, 1870; Nothonotus vulneratus (Cope, 1870)

Species of fish

The wounded darter (Etheostoma vulneratum) is a species of freshwater ray-finned fish, a darter from the subfamily Etheostomatinae, part of the family Percidae, which also contains the perches, ruffes and pikeperches. It is endemic to the eastern United States. Its range includes the upper Tennessee River drainage, western Virginia, western North Carolina, and eastern Tennessee. Its typical habitat is among boulders or coarse rubble and cobble, often with overhanging ledges, in medium to large slow-moving rivers. It feeds on small insect larvae, especially midge larvae. Spawning occurs when the water warms up in late spring. Females deposit clutches of adhesive eggs on the underside of rock ledges or slabs, and the male guards the nest. The population trend of this fish seems to be decreasing slowly but it is a relatively common species with numerous sub-populations, and the International Union for Conservation of Nature has assessed its conservation status as being of "least concern". The greatest threat comes from impoundment, and a management plan is in place, including captive breeding.

== Description ==
The wounded darter is a small percid fish characterized by a large caudal peduncle (similar to members of The subgenus Nothonotus), a terminal mouth, lines running the length of its body, a rounded caudal fin, eyes oriented nearly vertically, and olive coloration. Upon reaching sexual maturity, the male is dotted with small red spots with medial fins containing red blotching.

== Distribution ==
The wounded darter occurs throughout much of the upper Tennessee River drainage, north to far western Virginia. The westernmost extent of its distribution is White's Creek, on the eastern slope of the Cumberland Plateau in Tennessee, with its southeastern terminus of its distribution being the Little Tennessee River in North Carolina above Fontana Dam. The species is most abundant in reaches of the Little River in Blount County, Tennessee, as well as localities in the Little Tennessee River and the Clinch River above Norris Reservoir. Throughout the majority of its range, however, E. vulneratum is not as common. Surveys suggest this species is struggling throughout much of its range.

Historically, the wounded darter was more widespread within the upper Tennessee River drainage. Due to anthropomorphic pressures, including the creation of impoundments, this darter, as well as other darter species, can no longer inhabit many stretches of its native creeks and rivers. In addition, agricultural practices of the 1900s have left many of these streams unsuitable for this darter's reproductive and habitat needs. Today, the wounded darter is restricted to the uppermost reaches of rivers and rivers that have not been impounded.

== Ecology ==
The wounded darter inhabits moderate to large rivers. Its preferred habitat is boulder or coarse rubble and cobble, often with overhanging ledges. Their habitat, also including rock piles, provides optimal resting, hiding, and nesting areas. Unlike many similar darters, E. vulneratum is associated with gentle to moderately flowing water, as opposed to swift currents and riffles. It occupies depths of 0.5 m or more where suitable habitat exists.

During winter months, the wounded darter's diet consists of about 90% midge larvae, including chironomids. Their diets change as temperatures increase, diet shifts to 70% midge larvae with the rest being mayfly nymphs, water mites, larval black flies, crane flies, and hydropsychid caddisflies.

Several predatory piscivorous fishes commonly prey on the wounded darter. These include centrarchids and percids such as Micropterus dolomieu and Perca flavescens, respectively, among others. The primary competitors of the wounded darter are other darters of the Etheostoma and Percina genera. In addition, any benthic insectivorous fish, such as sculpin, may compete with E. vulneratum for food and habitat resources.

== Lifecycle ==
A study of E. vulneratum in the Little River in eastern Tennessee indicates the wounded darter begins spawning in May when water temperatures reach 16 °C. Breeding continues until late July or later, when water reaches 20 °C. Females deposit eggs in clutches in cavities on the undersides of rock ledges or slab rocks supported by other rocks. Nests contain an average of 48 eggs, but have been observed to contain 17 to 166 eggs. These eggs, though deposited in one nest, can result from multiple spawning acts, possibly with multiple females contributing. Spawning can occur multiple times in one breeding season. Occasionally, as the female deposits her eggs, the male stands guard outside the nesting cavity and returns later to fertilize them. He then guards the eggs until they hatch. In one study, one male E. vulneratum guarded a nest for 17 consecutive days, perhaps more a behavior of territoriality than parental care.

Upon hatching, the benthic larvae are largely immobile and defenseless until the absorption of their yolk sac. At one year of age, lengths of E. vulneratum range from 22 to 40 mm. Similarly to Etheostoma maculatum, sexual maturity is not reached until age two, with a lifespan of around four to five years.

== Management ==
Due to the current abundance of E. vulneratum, it does not warrant protected status. Because of the rarity, jeopardized status, susceptibility to ill effects from contaminants, and restricted ranges of its sister species, the wounded darter could easily become an imperiled species and should be monitored periodically.

The biggest contributing factor to the decline in wounded darter numbers is habitat loss from the creation of impoundments. With fear of localized extirpation of E. vulneratum from hydroelectric dam projects on the Little Tennessee and Cheoah Rivers, the utility company Tapoco commissioned a restoration project for the wounded darter in 2008. Soon after, Knoxville, Tennessee, the nonprofit Conservation Fisheries, Inc. (CFI) began propagating wounded darters for eventual reintroduction. In addition to wounded darters, the restoration project included the stonecat (Noturus flavus) and the sicklefin redhorse (Moxostoma spp.).

CFI's captive propagation process involves collection of wild adults, captive spawning, hatching, rearing, tagging and releasing. This protocol has been refined by CFI since 1995 through propagation of the wounded darter's sister species, the boulder darter. Nearly 900 young of wounded darters were reintroduced into the Cheoah River between 2008 and 2009, with similar numbers being reintroduced annually since then. CFI continues to survey for wounded darters in the Cheoah River, as well as other rivers in the Tennessee River and Little Tennessee River drainages.
