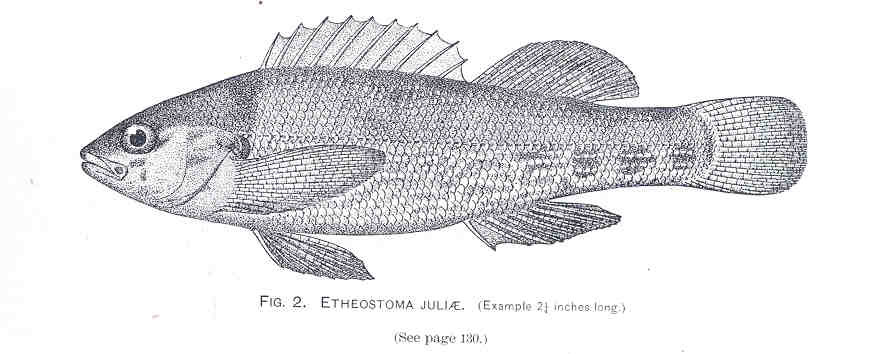

Conservation status
- Least Concern (IUCN 3.1)

Scientific classification
- Kingdom: Animalia
- Phylum: Chordata
- Class: Actinopterygii
- Order: Perciformes
- Family: Percidae
- Genus: Etheostoma
- Species: E. juliae

Binomial name
- Etheostoma juliae (Meek, 1891)

= Yoke darter =

Species of fish

The yoke darter (Etheostoma juliae) is a species of freshwater ray-finned fish, a darter from the subfamily Etheostomatinae, part of the family Percidae, which also contains the perches, ruffes and pikeperches. It is endemic to the eastern United States, where it occurs in the White River drainage in southern Missouri and northern Arkansas. It inhabits clear, fast, rocky riffles of creeks and small to medium rivers. This species can reach a length of 7.8 cm (3.1 in). The specific name honors Mrs Julia Hughes Gilbert, the wife of the American ichthyologist Charles Henry Gilbert (1859–1928).
