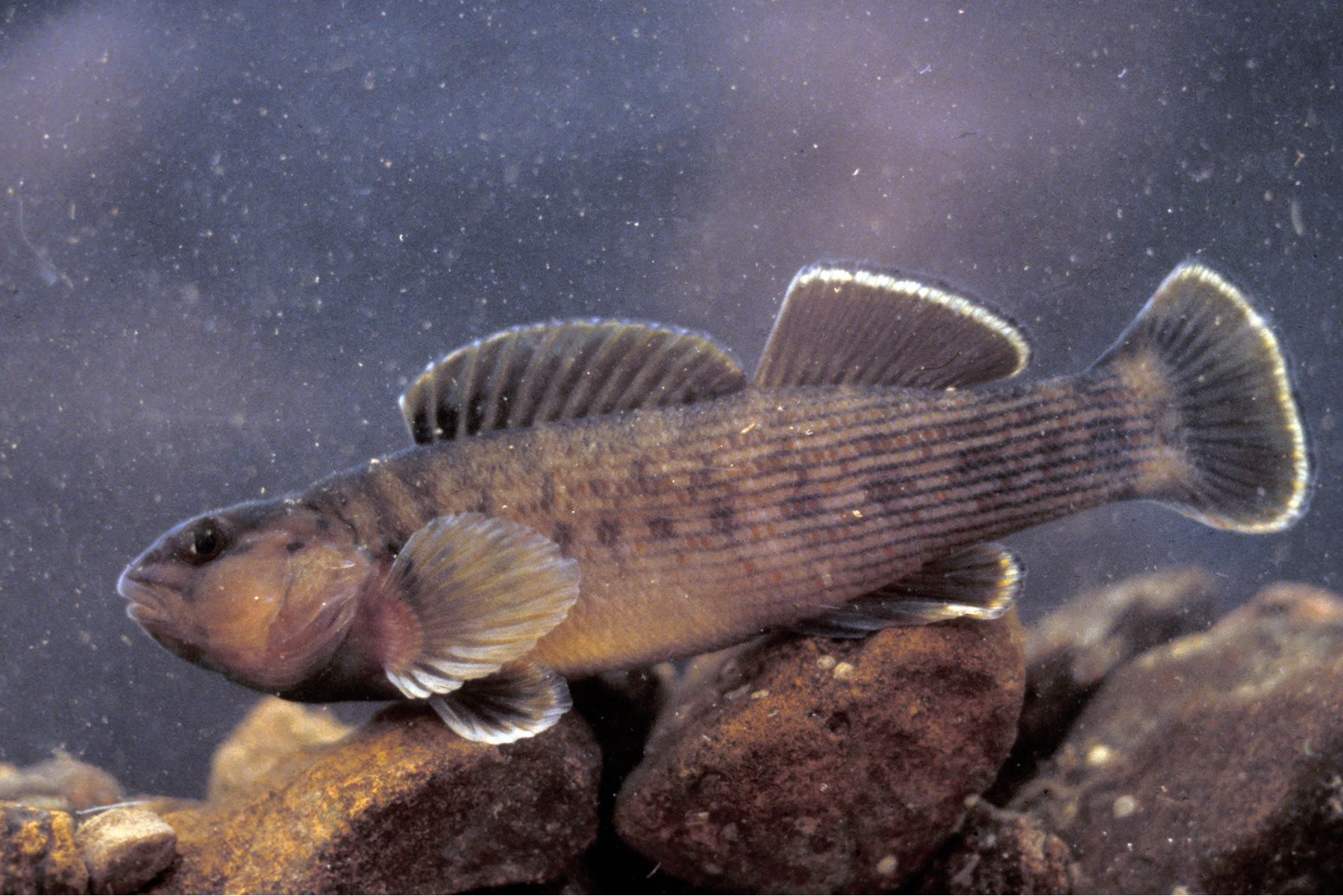
- Nothonotus camurus

Conservation status
- Least Concern (IUCN 3.1)

Scientific classification
- Kingdom: Animalia
- Phylum: Chordata
- Class: Actinopterygii
- Order: Perciformes
- Family: Percidae
- Genus: Nothonotus
- Species: N. camurus

Binomial name
- Nothonotus camurus (Cope, 1870)

Synonyms
- Poecilichthys camurus Cope, 1870; Etheostoma camurum (Cope, 1870)

= Bluebreast darter =

Species of fish

The bluebreast darter (Nothonotus camurus) is a small species of freshwater ray-finned fish, a darter from the genus Nothonotus, part of the family Percidae, which also contains the perches, ruffes and pikeperches. It is endemic to the eastern United States from New York and Illinois to Tennessee and North Carolina.

== Introduction ==
The bluebreast darter is small in size, rarely reaching longer than three inches. The snout is a blunt, more rounded than other darters, and its gill covers do not bridge the breast. It is a colorful fish, predominantly olive green with a broad, lighter band that runs adjacent to the dark fringe of the second dorsal and anal fins, reaching the base of the caudal fin. During breeding, though, males tend to be very colorful, usually with orange-tinted dorsal fins, dark red spots along the sides, and the descriptive bright blue breast from which it gets its name. The species is commonly found in clean-flowing, medium to large rivers with high benthic current velocity and an abundance of sedimentary gravel. Currently, N. camurus is listed as imperiled or higher in seven eastern US states.

== Geographic distribution ==
This darter's range covers most of the Eastern Highlands in the US, extending latitudinally from Tennessee to New York and longitudinally from West Virginia to Illinois. Populations have historically inhabited streams in the Ohio River drainage, the Alleghany River basin (NY and PA), the Wabash River basin (IN and IL), and the Tennessee River basin (TN and NC). Its habitats in these regions have patchy distributions as a result of habitat degradation and fragmentation following the post-Pleistocene dispersal. In New York, its conservation status will likely be raised to 'endangered' following its severe population decline. Likely causes of decline have been linked to physical effects, such as impoundments, and chemical effects, such as agriculture drainage runoff, to the darter's natural habitat. In addition, its specialized habitat makes it highly vulnerable to environmental and anthropogenic pressures. As a result of these pressures, populations have become increasingly isolated and restricted to moderate to large streams with turbid flow and high water quality.

== Ecology ==
This darter's habitat is highly specialized and dependent on water quality and stream velocity. These habitats are located in eddies and riffles behind boulders in large to moderately sized, gravel-bottomed streams. More specifically, populations often exist in the benthopelagic regions in the water column, ranging from depths of 10 to 30 cm. Its diet typically consists of insect (e.g. dipteran) larvae due mostly to morphological restraints, including an average gape size of around 8 mm. Temperature ranges year-round are unknown, but spawning water temperatures range from 10 to 24 °C. Predators for this particular species are not clear, but data on a sister species, the rainbow darter (E. caeruleum), suggest larger freshwater fish, such as burbots (Lota lota), stonecats (Noturus flavus), and smallmouth bass (Micropterus dolomieu) have been known to prey on darters. Although data are largely unknown, predation effects on the bluebreast darter are thought to be relatively low due to the small, localized habitats of this species in riffles and eddies behind boulders that prevent larger pelagic fish from exploiting them. Typical anthropogenic effects detrimental to their ecology include strip mining, mica shale siltation, impoundments (dams), and agricultural drainage runoff.

== Life history ==
The breeding season for this fish peaks from mid-May through June for many habitats. During this time, nuptial males develop their characteristic blue breast and brick-red spotting on their sides. Spawning begins when the males become territorial and seek out eddies and riffles in the head streams. Females soon follow and decide both the location of the reproductive event and the individual mates. Mating is stimulated once the female begins a ritual that involves a sequence of erratic darts that are then mimicked by the male. Once this occurs, the female will bury herself into a gravel shoal, nearly level with the bottom of the streambed. Then the male will approach from above and a series of vibrations, lasting no longer than 10 sec at a time, will signify each reproductive event. This is known to occur at least three times per reproductive event. About 100 eggs are laid during this time. The males then stay behind to guard the eggs during a seven- to 10-day incubation period, after which parental care ceases. Data on clutch sizes are unclear for N. camurus, but studies on sister species, like the fantail darter (E. flabellare), suggest numbers range from 33 to 96 individuals. Sexual maturity for the juveniles is reached within the first year for most species within the genus, and the typical life span for N. camurus is three years. Anthropogenic changes in water velocity can affect its breeding cycle . Also, increased turbidity due to stormwater runoff in streams can be detrimental to egg clusters buried in the gravel streambed, often causing eggs to become detached and free flowing, downstream and out of the protective care of the male.

== Current management ==
The incentive for conservation action of this species stems from its role as an indicator species; spotty distributions and specialized habitats are of particular concern. Specifically, small populations, isolated by physical impoundments, have an increased risk for a host of genetic problems, including inbreeding effects, genetic drift, and loss of heterozygocity. Anthropogenic effects from siltation buildup, impoundments, strip mining, dredging, agriculture, and roadway runoff have all had detrimental impacts on its breeding and habitat. N. camurus is not currently placed on IUCN's Red list, but NatureServe recommends close monitoring of its habitat and water quality. NatureServe has currently listed N. camurus to be 'critically imperiled' in Illinois, Alabama, Indiana, and New York, 'imperiled' in Ohio, Pennsylvania, and Virginia, 'vulnerable' in West Virginia, and 'apparently secure' in Tennessee and Kentucky. Recent efforts in the Ohio River drainage have revived populations back to historical numbers. This has been achieved by attempts to improve water quality in these regions. Studies suggest increased awareness and close monitoring of streams and waterways are needed, suggesting most of the threats to the species well-being are human related. Little information exists for threats caused by predation, invasive species competition, or overfishing.

== Management recommendations ==
Because of its isolated and specialized habitat, N. camurus is of particular ecological concern. Anthropogenic effects are thought to be the cause of most population decline, as increased human development has been detrimental to both habitat and breeding. Additionally, N. camurus has been linked to spawning of the endangered tan riffleshell (Epioblasma florentina walkeri). Studies have shown the riffelshell larvae attach to N. camurus during maturation.
