= Tuskaloosa darter =

Conservation status
- Least Concern (IUCN 3.1)

Scientific classification
- Kingdom: Animalia
- Phylum: Chordata
- Class: Actinopterygii
- Order: Perciformes
- Family: Percidae
- Genus: Etheostoma
- Species: E. douglasi

Binomial name
- Etheostoma douglasi R. M. Wood & Mayden, 1993

Species of fish

The Tuskaloosa darter (Etheostoma douglasi) is a species of freshwater ray-finned fish, a darter from the subfamily Etheostomatinae, part of the family Percidae, which also contains the perches, ruffes and pikeperches. It is endemic to Alabama in the United States, where it occurs only in the upper Black Warrior River drainage, with disjunct populations occurring in the Locust Fork system and upper Sipsey Fork systems.

This fish inhabits rocky riffles of creeks and small to medium rivers. Adults typically occur in riffles of streams with moderate to strong current over gravel or cobble substrate.
