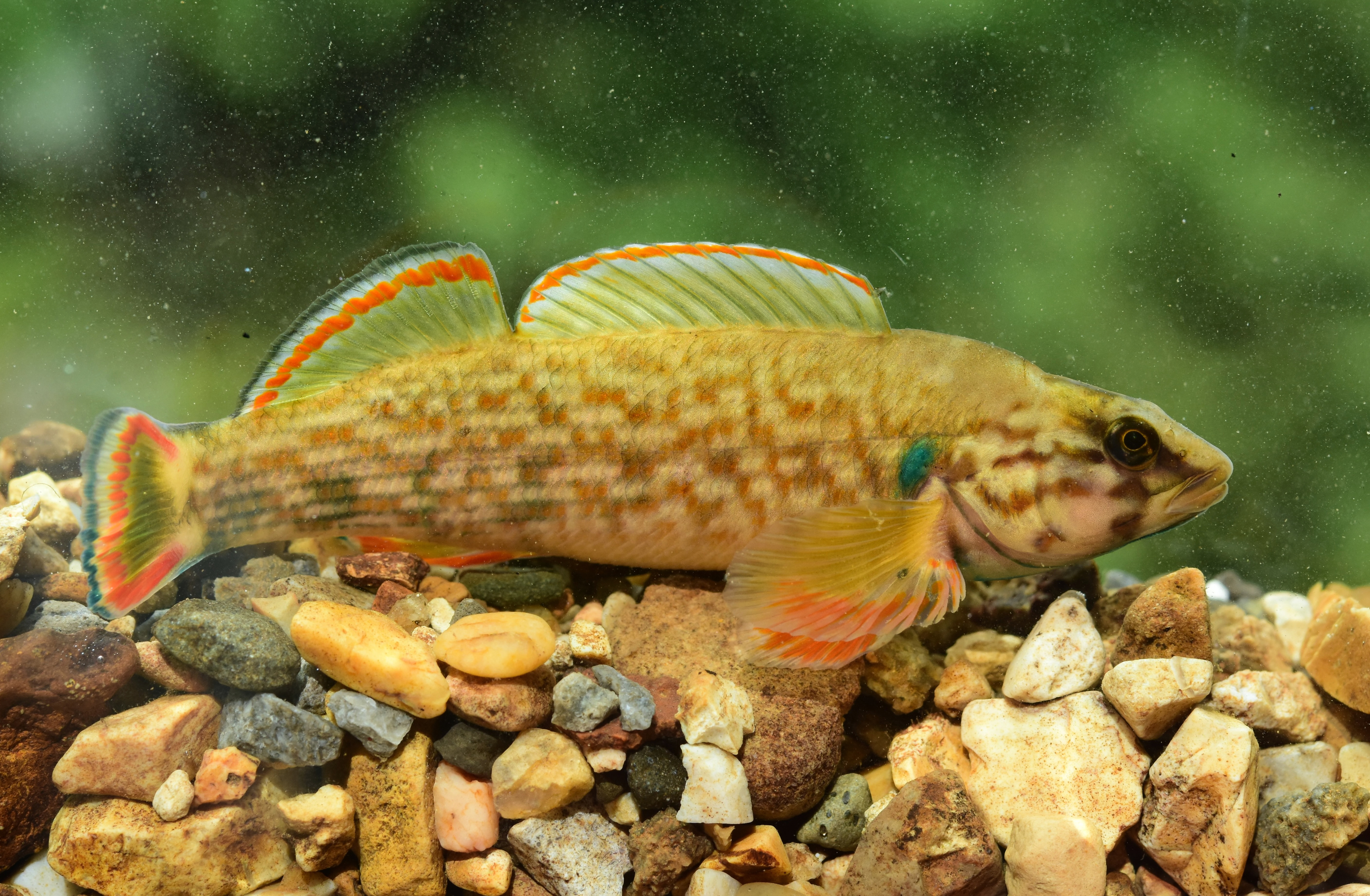

Conservation status
- Least Concern (IUCN 3.1)

Scientific classification
- Kingdom: Animalia
- Phylum: Chordata
- Class: Actinopterygii
- Order: Perciformes
- Family: Percidae
- Genus: Nothonotus
- Species: N. rufilineatus

Binomial name
- Nothonotus rufilineatus (Cope, 1870)

Synonyms
- Poecilichthys rufilineatus Cope, 1870; Etheostoma rufilineatum (Cope, 1870)

= Nothonotus rufilineatus =

Species of fish

Nothonotus rufilineatus, the redline darter, is a species of freshwater ray-finned fish, a darter from the subfamily Etheostomatinae, part of the family Percidae, which also contains the perches, ruffes and pikeperches. It is endemic to the southeastern United States.

This fish, like most other darter species, tends to inhabit clear, rocky riffles of streams, creeks, and small rivers. Both currently and historically, this fish is known from only the Tennessee and Cumberland River drainages in Tennessee, Virginia, Kentucky, Alabama, North Carolina, Georgia, and Mississippi. The average length for this fish is 6.9 cm (2.7 in), with a maximum recorded length of 8.4 cm (3.3 in). The maximum recorded life span in the wild for this species is four years. The redline darter feeds mainly on aquatic macroinvertebrates, including midge fly, black fly, and caddisfly larvae, as well as water mites and mayfly nymphs. These fish spawn in the spring and early summer, from May through August. Females reportedly lay between 21 and 131 eggs, which are fertilized by the male and buried in the substrate. Males then guard the nest until the eggs hatch. Redline darters are among the most common darter species throughout much of their range, so do not require any specialized management. These darters do benefit, however, from management activities that promote healthy streams and a diversity of other darter species because of similar habitat requirements. Due to feeding and reproduction habits, these fish require flowing water, meaning that damming of creeks or streams by humans or beavers could result in extirpation of this species from those water bodies. Also, because this species needs clear water to feed, siltation and pollution that increase turbidity are detrimental to it.

== Ecology ==
Nothonotus rufilineatus exhibits typical darter behavior, preferring to live in riffles of small to medium-sized creeks, streams, and rivers, and is rarely if ever found in pools. This fish is also known to inhabit shallow water shoals over bedrock, as long as some scattered cobble or gravel is available. Areas containing scattered larger rocks are also preferred, because these rocks give the fish refuge from predators. Living in shallow areas limits predation from larger fishes, such as smallmouth bass (Micropterus dolomieu), because these fish are often too large to venture into riffles to feed. However, living in shallower water may make this darter more susceptible to predation from terrestrial hunters, such as wading birds and raccoons (Procyon lotor). Another possible explanation for this fish's choice of habitat is its feeding requirements. This fish feeds on aquatic and terrestrial insect larvae and other small invertebrates such as midgeflies, black flies, caddisflies, and water mites. These invertebrate species tend to be more abundant in areas inhabited by the redline darter, so are readily available as a food source. Availability of different food sources varies by season and location; the feeding habits of redline darters change accordingly. Because of its choice of food and habitat, the redline darter is often in direct competition with other species of darters, Nothotus spp. and many of the Etheostoma spp. The redline darter also competes with other small fish with similar habitat requirements.

== Lifecycle ==
The breeding season for the redline darter extends from spring through early summer, with fish at higher elevations and more northerly latitudes breeding later than those at lower elevation and more southerly latitudes. During spawning, the female will lay between 21 and 131 eggs by depositing them directly into the gravel substrate to ensure they are well-protected from predators. The eggs will then be fertilized by the male, which will guard the nest until the eggs have hatched. This fish is believed to have a maximum lifespan of around four years in the wild and reaches sexual maturity after one year, meaning a single female could only produce a total of about 350–400 eggs during her lifetime. This is a fairly low number when compared to some other species of fish that may produce tens or even hundreds of thousands of eggs. However, redline darter eggs, fry, and offspring have a fairly high survival rate due to the concealment of eggs and the protection afforded by the males. Both man-made and natural siltation is thought to impact the survival rate of the eggs of the redline darter and many other species, because it can result in a reduction or complete lack of oxygen penetrating the egg membrane.

== Conservation ==
Currently, no special programs or policies are put into place specifically to manage for the redline darter. Unlike several other darter species, this species is not threatened, and is believed to be one of the most common species of darter throughout its range, with a population perhaps over 1,000,000 individuals. Many state and federal agencies, such as US Fish and Wildlife Service, the National Park Service, the US Forest Service, the Tennessee Wildlife Resources Agency, and the North Carolina Wildlife Resources Commission, currently engage in stream monitoring activities aimed toward improving stream health and surveying populations of fishes. Although these programs do not specifically focus on management of the redline darter, population data on this species and many other species are collected, thus helping to avoid future population problems. Also, in an effort to curb siltation and pollution that have historically been an issue for many stream-dwelling fish, many states have begun to pass laws and to educate landowners on the prevention of siltation. Increased pollution and siltation can result in higher water turbidity, making it difficult for this darter, and many other fish species, to forage for food, breed, and potentially decreasing the ability to avoid predators.
