= Sharphead darter =

Conservation status
- Vulnerable (IUCN 3.1)

Scientific classification
- Kingdom: Animalia
- Phylum: Chordata
- Class: Actinopterygii
- Order: Perciformes
- Family: Percidae
- Genus: Etheostoma
- Species: E. acuticeps

Binomial name
- Etheostoma acuticeps R. M. Bailey, 1959

Species of fish

The sharphead darter (Etheostoma acuticeps) is a species of freshwater ray-finned fish, a darter from the subfamily Etheostomatinae, part of the family Percidae, which also contains the perches, ruffes and pikeperches. It is endemic to the eastern United States, where it is only known to occur in the Holston and Nolichucky River systems. It inhabits small to medium-sized rivers, being found in rocky riffles in deep, fast-flowing waters. This species can reach a length of 8.4 cm (3.3 in), though most only reach about 5.5 cm (2.2 in).
