= Bandfin darter =

Conservation status
- Least Concern (IUCN 3.1)

Scientific classification
- Kingdom: Animalia
- Phylum: Chordata
- Class: Actinopterygii
- Order: Perciformes
- Family: Percidae
- Genus: Etheostoma
- Species: E. zonistium

Binomial name
- Etheostoma zonistium R. M. Bailey & Etnier, 1988

Species of fish

The bandfin darter (Etheostoma zonistium) is a species of freshwater ray-finned fish, a darter from the subfamily Etheostomatinae, part of the family Percidae, which also contains the perches, ruffes and pikeperches. It is endemic to the eastern United States. It occurs in tributaries of the lower Tennessee River system and uppermost Black Warrior River system. This species inhabits gravel and sandy pools in flowing waters up to the size of small rivers. It can reach a length of 7.1 centimetres (2.8 in) TL.
