= Tallapoosa darter =

Conservation status
- Least Concern (IUCN 3.1)

Scientific classification
- Kingdom: Animalia
- Phylum: Chordata
- Class: Actinopterygii
- Order: Perciformes
- Family: Percidae
- Genus: Etheostoma
- Species: E. tallapoosae

Binomial name
- Etheostoma tallapoosae (Suttkus & Etnier, 1991)

Species of fish

The Tallapoosa darter (Etheostoma tallapoosae) is a species of freshwater ray-finned fish, a darter from the subfamily Etheostomatinae, part of the family Percidae, which also contains the perches, ruffes and pikeperches. It is endemic to the eastern United States, where it occurs above the Fall Line in the Tallapoosa River system in Georgia and Alabama. It inhabits bedrock pools and rocky riffles of creeks and small rivers.
