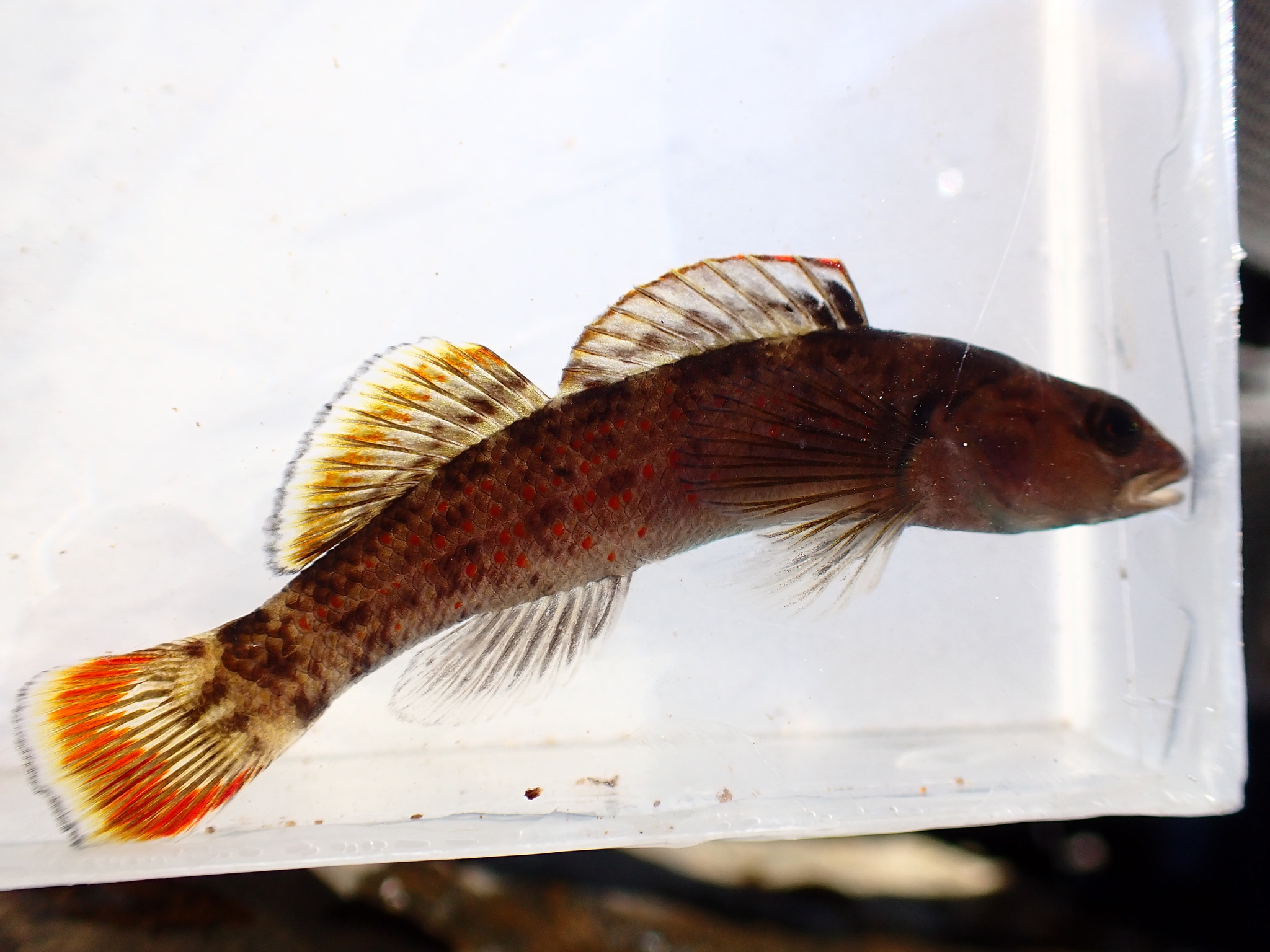

Conservation status
- Least Concern (IUCN 3.1)

Scientific classification
- Kingdom: Animalia
- Phylum: Chordata
- Class: Actinopterygii
- Order: Perciformes
- Family: Percidae
- Genus: Etheostoma
- Species: E. jordani

Binomial name
- Etheostoma jordani C. H. Gilbert, 1891

= Greenbreast darter =

Species of fish

The greenbreast darter (Etheostoma jordani) is a species of freshwater ray-finned fish, a darter from the subfamily Etheostomatinae, part of the family Percidae, which also contains the perches, ruffes and pikeperches. It is endemic to the southeastern United States, where it occurs in the systems of the Alabama River and the Black Warrior River. It is an inhabitant of streams and rocky riffles of creeks and smaller rivers. This species can reach a length of 7.9 cm (3.1 in), though most only reach about 5 cm (2.0 in).

== Description ==
The greenbreast darter is marked with red spots along the flanks, greenish-brown lips and a turquoise anal fin. The breeding males are olive in overall colour with an indistinct pattern of 3 to 11 dark vertical bars along the flanks. There are 8 or 9 olive to brown saddles along the back. The ventral part of the head, the breast and the gill membranes are turquoise. The spiny Part of the dorsal fin is clear to white On the margin with a red submarginal band Which is most obvious at the head end of the fin. The margin of the caudal fin has a thin turquoise or black band at its tops, a slender yellow band In the center, and a wide red to orange band near the base.

== Distribution ==
The green breast darter is restricted to the upper Mobile Basin (but not present in the Tombigbee River drainage), primarily above the Fall Line, and often a very common species in suitable habitats.

== Habitat and biology ==
Greenbreast darter adults typically occur in riffles of clear creeks and small to medium rivers, in moderate to strong current with gravel or rubble substrate. The eggs are laid in riffles with the bed made up of sand and gravel, batches of eggs being laid in different locations.

== Taxonomy and etymology ==
The greenbreast darter was first formally described in 1891 by the American ichthyologist Charles Henry Gilbert (1859–1948) with the type locality given as Choccolo Creek, tributary of Coosa River at Oxford, Calhoun County, Alabama. The specific name honors the American ichthyologist David Starr Jordan (1851–1931). it is considered to form a species complex with the lipstick darter (E. chuckwachatte), the Tuskaloosa darter (E. douglasi) and the Etowah darter (Etheostoma etowahae|E. etowahae).
