= Spotted darter =

Conservation status
- Vulnerable (IUCN 3.1)

Scientific classification
- Kingdom: Animalia
- Phylum: Chordata
- Class: Actinopterygii
- Order: Perciformes
- Family: Percidae
- Genus: Etheostoma
- Species: E. maculatum

Binomial name
- Etheostoma maculatum J. P. Kirtland, 1841

Synonyms
- Nothonotus maculatus (Kirtland, 1840)

Species of fish

The spotted darter (Etheostoma maculatum) is a species of freshwater ray-finned fish, a darter from the subfamily Etheostomatinae, part of the family Percidae, which also contains the perches, ruffes and pikeperches. It is endemic to the eastern United States where it occurs in the basin of the Ohio River. It inhabits fast-flowing rocky riffles of medium-sized and smaller rivers. This species can reach a length of 9 centimetres (3.5 in) TL though most only reach about 5.5 centimetres (2.2 in).

== Habitat ==
The spotted darter lives in freshwater rives. These rivers are typically marked with the presence of boulders and other rocks. Adult spotted darters can be found in deeper sections of the river. The range of the spotted darter includes Ohio, New York and Pennsylvania. However, its range has greatly decreased. For example, in the state of New York only a few specimens have been observed in a span ranging several years In the state of Ohio, the darter is considered endangered.
