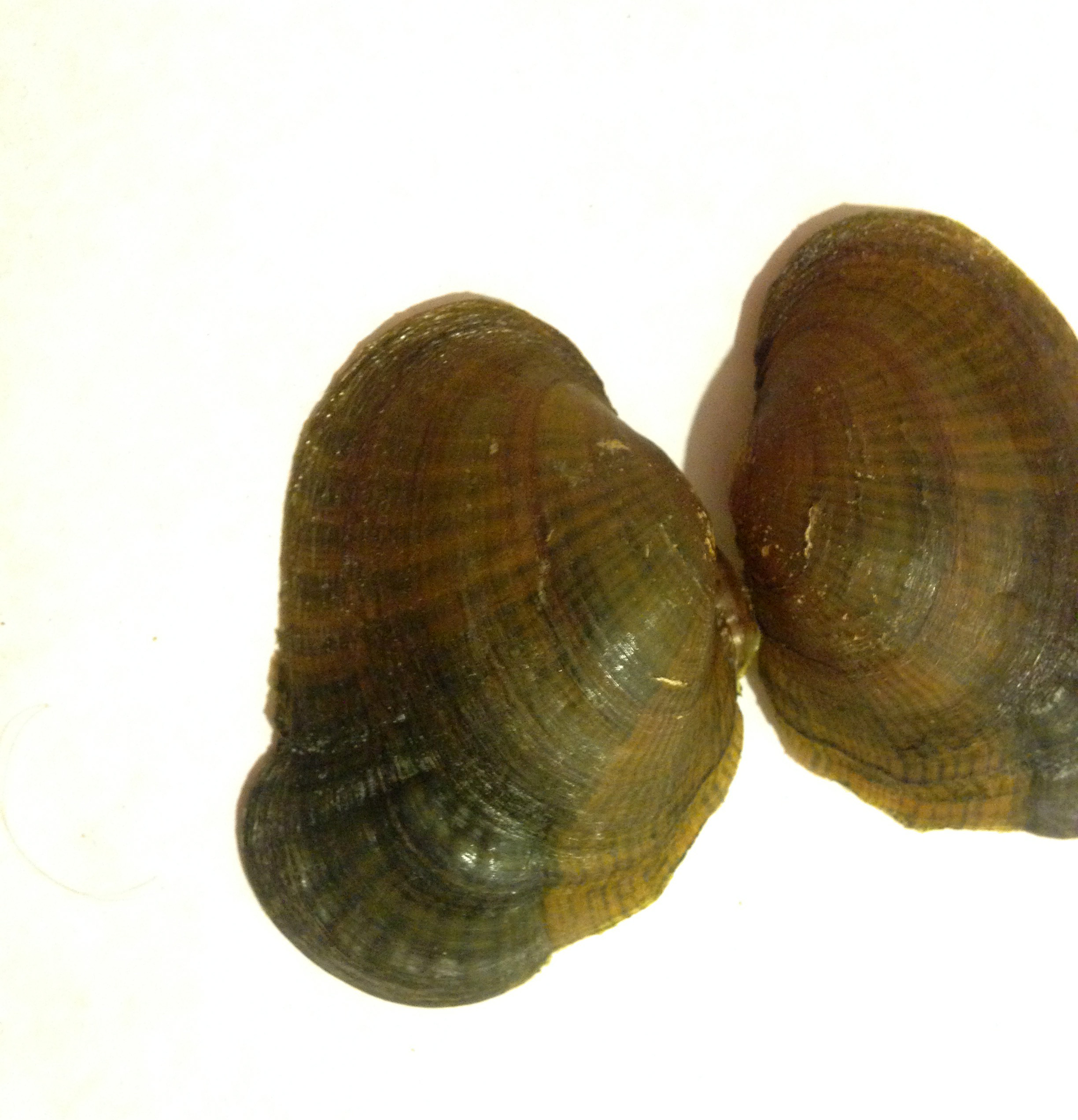
- Female specimen

Conservation status
- Critically Imperiled (NatureServe)

Scientific classification
- Kingdom: Animalia
- Phylum: Mollusca
- Class: Bivalvia
- Order: Unionida
- Family: Unionidae
- Genus: Epioblasma
- Species: E. ahlstedti

Binomial name
- Epioblasma ahlstedti Jones and Neves

= Epioblasma ahlstedti =

Species of bivalve

Epioblasma ahlstedti, commonly called the Duck River dartersnapper, is a species of freshwater mussel, an aquatic bivalve mollusk in the family Unionidae, the river mussels.

It is native to Alabama and Tennessee in the southeastern United States, where it is endemic to the Tennessee River drainage. Although it is currently known only from the Duck River in Tennessee, museum specimens document that it was also historically found in the Buffalo River, the main stem of the Tennessee River at Muscle Shoals, and in Shoal Creek, Alabama.

Like many freshwater mussels, this species has experienced extreme habitat loss and is now considered to be critically imperiled by NatureServe. The last remaining populations are found only in a 30-mile stretch of the Duck River, one of the most biologically diverse rivers in North America.

This species was described to science in 2010, distinguishing it from the closely related (and also endangered) Epioblasma capsaeformis.

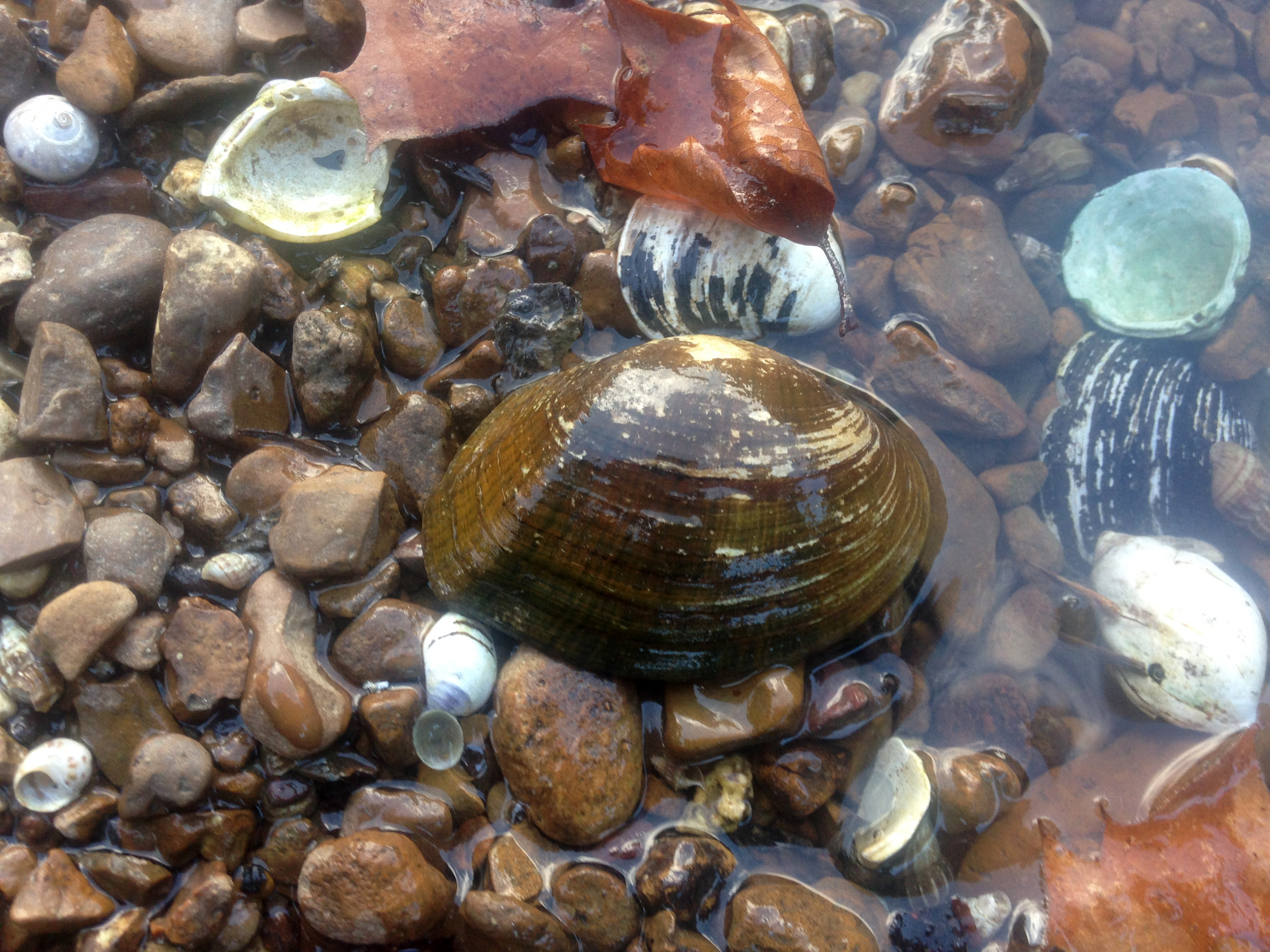
Male specimen, distinguished by lacking the marsupial swelling (the "claw") of the female
