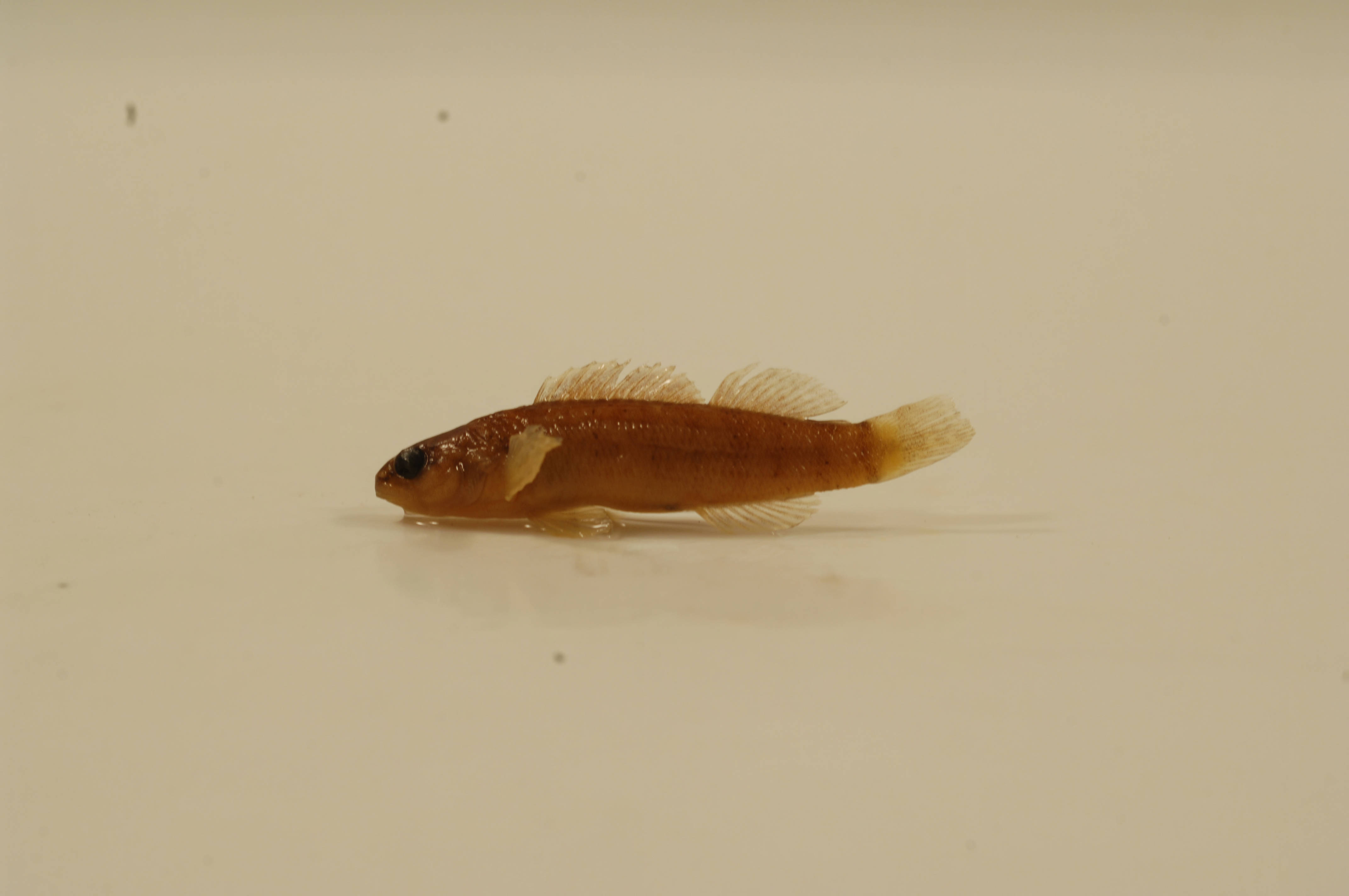

Conservation status
- Near Threatened (IUCN 3.1)

- Vulnerable (NatureServe)

Scientific classification
- Kingdom: Animalia
- Phylum: Chordata
- Class: Actinopterygii
- Order: Perciformes
- Family: Percidae
- Genus: Etheostoma
- Species: E. tippecanoe

Binomial name
- Etheostoma tippecanoe D. S. Jordan & Evermann, 1890

= Tippecanoe darter =

Species of fish

The Tippecanoe darter (Etheostoma tippecanoe) is a species of freshwater ray-finned fish, a darter from the subfamily Etheostomatinae, part of the family Percidae, which also contains the perches, ruffes and pikeperches. It is endemic to the eastern United States.

== Description ==
One of the smallest darters, E. tippecanoe never reaches lengths over 2.0 in; 1.3 in is the common adult size. The body and fins of the male is dusky with scattered spots and vertical banding. Blue-black bars on the sides are darkest at the rear. It has 40–65 lateral scales. A breeding male will develop a bright orange throat, belly, spots at the caudal fin base and fins margins. The female also has dark vertical bars on its sides that are most visible near the tail, but they are usually less distinct than those on a male. The female has two yellow spots at the caudal fin base. All of their fins are clear with many dark spots scattered across them, often forming rows.

On both sexes, the belly will bear very few scales. A distinguishing characteristic is the two light spots at the base of the caudal fin, creating an hourglass shape. The circular banding around the head is also distinctive. The center portion of their pelvic fins is a dark blue-black color.

== Distribution ==
The Tippecanoe darter is distributed through Pennsylvania, Ohio, Indiana, West Virginia, Kentucky, and Tennessee, most commonly in medium to large streams and rivers. Since 2014, very small populations of Tippecanoe Darters have also been found in the Vermillion River (Wabash Basin) in Illinois. Adults are found in deeper (>20 inches), fast, gravel/cobble riffles. Juveniles are segregated to shallower riffles. Most of their time is spent between rocks and under gravel, so they can be very difficult to find. Previous specimen capture attempts have shown their preference for American water willow (Justicia americana). Other similar plant species can be good indicators for possible E. tippecanoe habitat. This species has expanded its range in some areas, including the 2017 discovery of Tippecanoe Darters in Alum Creek on Ohio Dominican University's campus in Columbus, Ohio.

== Ecology ==
In general, the Tippecanoe darter is an opportunistic darter species that feeds on immature insects. Studies show prey were consumed proportionally to their occurrence in the habitat. This darter is a general ambush-type feeder. The darter will lie in wait and "dart" up to grab passing insects from overhead. Juveniles consume proportionally smaller prey items and more chironomids than do adults. This could be related to ease of capture or possibly because of availability. Juvenile Tippecanoe darters are displaced into shallower riffles, and chironomids may be more prevalent in these areas. Adult darters rarely consumed prey longer than 6 mm.

During times of low food availability (winter months), E. tippecanoe may become more specialized due to interspecific competition in the area. It is a direct competitor with other Etheostoma species in its habitat, including E. zonale, E. blennioides, and E. flabellare. Localized human pollution that affects insect availability can have a direct effect on the Tippecanoe darter. As less food becomes available, E. tippecanoe will quickly be lost because of its inability to alter prey size selection.

== Lifecycle ==
Spawning activity takes place in spring to early summer when the temperature reaches and exceeds an average of 25 °C. E. tippecanoe is mature at one year and is ready to breed. A dominant male will establish a territory around large flat stones and attract multiple females to his nesting site. The females will bury themselves in gravel, horizontally, with their caudal fins exposed. The dominant males will not tolerate other males in his territory and will vigorously defend his mates. The females will lay eggs and the males will fertilize them while the females are still in the gravel. During fertilization, a visible increase in male coloration can be observed. After fertilization, the males will leave the female to guard the eggs.

The eggs, on average, are about 1.4 mm in diameter and will hatch about 211 hours after being laid. Gravid females on average will hold 60 eggs, but have been observed with 120 eggs. Hatchling range from 5.0 to 5.1 mm. E. tippecanoe may also be a fractional spawner, generating more eggs during the year. Egg burying by E. tippecanoe is thought to be preadaptive for the evolution of egg-clumping found in closely related species.

Spawning activity of the Tippecanoe darter is very similar to other closely related darters, such as the orangethroated darter Because the Tippecanoe darter needs clean gravel to spawn its eggs, it is very sensitive to siltation. An area with poor erosion control upstream could very easily wipe out a breeding population quickly.

== Management ==
Currently, the Tippecanoe darter is listed as vulnerable in Kentucky and imperiled in West Virginia and Pennsylvania. The species is extremely vulnerable to turbidity and siltation. In parts of the species native range where it is considered threatened, streamside management is an important tool. Improper forestry practices, mining, and road construction are all threats to the reproductive health of the species. The Clean Water Act is the most important piece of legislation for this species. Another bill regulating nonpoint source pollution is pending a vote in Congress and could also help the Tippecanoe darter. Indiana uses a common approach to address nonpoint source pollution known as the watershed approach, which assesses the total geographic area that drains storm water (and pollutants) into a particular stream, lake, aquifer, or other water body. This attempts to quantify all potential sources of pollution within a watershed.

== Recommendations ==
Management of the species requires monitoring of native populations. The Tippecanoe darter is a good indicator species and will be one of the first species to disappear after a pollution event. Because of its selectivity in breeding areas, it is important to monitor this species below logging or construction operations. Presence-absence surveys are extremely important considering the short lifespan of the darter (3–4 yr).

The small size of the darter makes effective electroshocking difficult. Kick seining and snorkeling are the most effective methods to assess populations. It is also important not to sample or interrupt the species during its spawning cycle (early spring with water temperatures above 25 °C). Snorkel sampling is a noninvasive way to sample the desired fish species.
