= Lipstick darter =

Conservation status
- Least Concern (IUCN 3.1)

Scientific classification
- Kingdom: Animalia
- Phylum: Chordata
- Class: Actinopterygii
- Order: Perciformes
- Family: Percidae
- Genus: Etheostoma
- Species: E. chuckwachatte

Binomial name
- Etheostoma chuckwachatte Mayden & R.M. Wood, 1993

Species of fish

The lipstick darter (Etheostoma chuckwachatte) is a species of freshwater ray-finned fish, a darter from the subfamily Etheostomatinae, part of the family Percidae, which also contains the perches, ruffes and pikeperches. It is endemic to the eastern United States, where it occurs in the Tallapoosa River drainage above the Fall Line in Alabama and Georgia. It inhabits rocky riffles of creeks and small to medium rivers.

== Description ==
The lipstick darter is a small fish with a laterally compressed body and it attains a maximum standard length of around 6 centimetres (2.4 in). It has 8–9 square shaped blotches along its back and 5–6 faint vertical bars towards the tail on the flanks. Adult males have obvious red-orange colored lips and large spots along the flanks of a similar color, as well as showing orange and blue-green coloration on the anal fin. When they are spawning, the first dorsal fin of the males takes on a dusky hue and with an orange margin while the second dorsal fin has an orange band immediately below a blue marginal band. The flanks of the females are mottled brown and in some cases these are marked with indistinct vertical bars. The females may also show a narrow red band on the margin of the first dorsal fin and indistinct turquoise coloring on the chest.

== Distribution ==
The lipstick darter is found throughout the Tallapoosa River system above the Fall Line in Alabama and Georgia in the southeastern United Statates.

== Habitat and biology ==
Lipstick darters are found in riffles which have fast currents in larger streams and rivers, here they frequently hunt among and around gravel and cobble on the riverbed. Where flows are moderate or slow they are most commonly recorded in shallow riffles at depths of 12–36 centimetres (4.7–14.2 in) deep (5–14 in), where there is a faster current and cover is provided by submerged vegetation, pebbles or rock overhangs. Its shape enables it to squeeze between the rocks and in crevices to look for food even where there is a very fast flow. They feed by picking off the aquatic larvae of insects from the rocks or vegetation. Their prey is made up of fly, mayfly, and stonefly larvae. The spawning season runs from April up to June and they bury their eggs in the gravel between the pebbles. The females have been collected with ripe eggs when the temperature of the water was in the range 20–26 °C (68–79 °F). Their lifespan is thought to be 2–3 years.

== Taxonomy ==
The lipstick darter was first formally described in 1993 by Richard L. Mayden and Robert M. Wood with the type locality given as Hillabee Creek at the Alabama State Route 22, 11.7 kilometres (7.3 miles) northeast of Alexander City, Alabama. It is regarded as a members of the greenbreast darter (E. jordani) species complex and it is not sympatric with any other member of that species complex.
