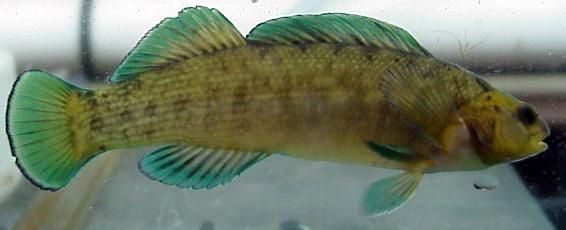

Conservation status
- Vulnerable (IUCN 3.1)

- Endangered (ESA)

Scientific classification
- Kingdom: Animalia
- Phylum: Chordata
- Class: Actinopterygii
- Order: Perciformes
- Family: Percidae
- Genus: Etheostoma
- Species: E. wapiti

Binomial name
- Etheostoma wapiti Etnier & J. D. Williams, 1989

Synonyms
- Nothonotus wapiti (Etnier & J. D. Williams, 1989)

= Boulder darter =

Species of fish

The boulder darter (Etheostoma wapiti) is a species of freshwater ray-finned fish, a darter from the subfamily Etheostomatinae, part of the family Percidae, which also contains the perches, ruffes and pikeperches. It is endemic to Alabama and Tennessee in the United States, where it occurs in the Elk River system and Shoal Creek. It is found in small rivers and fast-flowing streams, at least 2 ft (0.6 m) deep, with boulders or a rocky base. It feeds on aquatic insect larvae but little is known of its natural history. The population trend of this fish is unknown but it is affected by a rise in siltation and the impoundment of water within its range by the building of dams. The International Union for Conservation of Nature has assessed its conservation status as being "vulnerable".

== Description ==
The boulder darter grows up to 7.6 cm (3 inches) long and is olive to gray in color. Little is known about its life history. It probably spawns in the spring months of April and May.

== Distribution and habitat ==
The boulder darter occurs only in the Elk River and a few of its larger tributaries. Its range in the Elk River extends from Fayetteville to just above the Wheeler Reservoir and half a mile below the Alabama State Highway 127 bridge. The tributaries in which it is found are the lower parts of Richland Creek, the mouth of Indian Creek, both in south-central Tennessee (Giles and Lincoln counties) and Limestone County, in northern Alabama. Its preferred habitat is fast-flowing streams, at least 2 ft (0.6 m) deep, with a substrate of rock or boulders. It requires good water quality. Its diet is thought to consist primarily of immature aquatic insects.

== Status ==
It was listed as endangered under the U.S. Endangered Species Act effective October 3, 1988. It has been extirpated from most of its natural range as a result of human activities. Releases of cold water from Tims Ford Reservoir likely explain its disappearance from the upper Elk River in Lincoln County, Tennessee. Flooding of lower reaches of Shoal Creek by Wilson Dam and industrial pollution in upper reaches of the stream probably led to the loss of the population formerly present in Shoal Creek. The boulder darter was last observed and collected in Shoal Creek in the 1880s. The IUCN has listed the boulder darter as "Vulnerable" and considers that further habitat and population monitoring programs should be undertaken to protect the fish and its habitat.
