= Piedmont, Georgia =

Unincorporated community in Lamar County, Georgia, USA

- Unincorporated Community
- Piedmont, Georgia
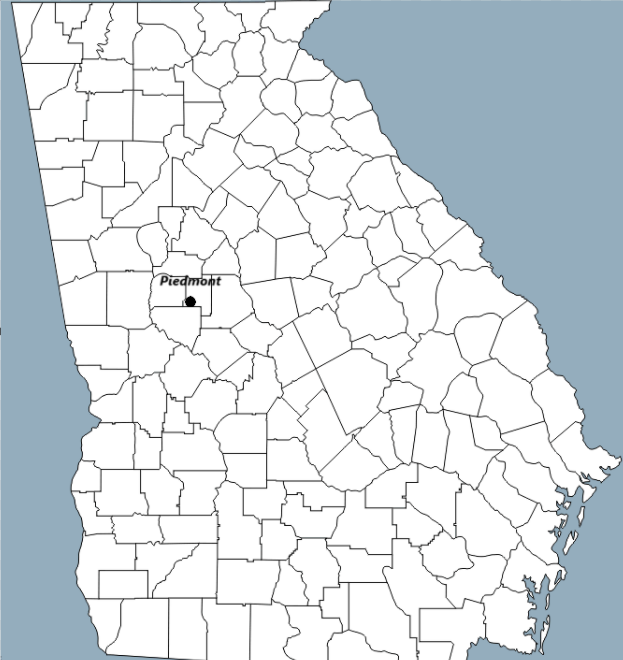
- Location in Georgia
- Time zone: Eastern Standard Time
  - Summer (DST): Eastern Daylight Time
- Postal code: 30204

Piedmont is an unincorporated community located in Southwestern Lamar County, Georgia, United States, with coordinates of 33.017 -84.251. U.S. Route 19 passes about four miles west from town, available via Allen, Piedmont, and Vega roads. Georgia State Route 36 passes about four miles south southwest of Piedmont, accessible via The Rock road.

== History ==
A post office named Piedmont opened in 1890 and remained in operation until 1930.
