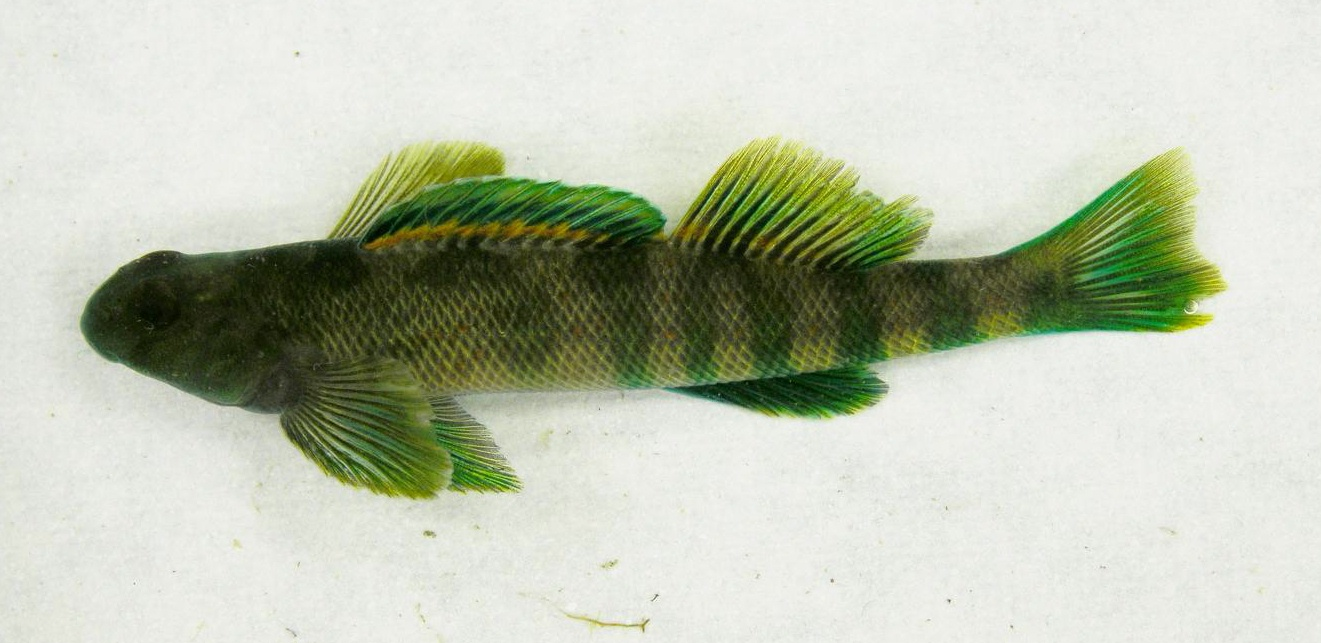
- Etheostoma blennioides

Scientific classification
- Kingdom: Animalia
- Phylum: Chordata
- Class: Actinopterygii
- Division: Teleostei
- Order: Perciformes
- Family: Percidae
- Subfamily: Etheostomatinae; Agassiz, 1850

Genera
- see text

= Etheostomatinae =

Subfamily of fishes

Etheostomatinae is a species-rich subfamily of freshwater ray-finned fish, the members of which are commonly known as the darters. The subfamily is part of the family Percidae which also includes the perches, ruffes and pikeperches. The family is endemic to North America. It consists of three to five different genera and well over 200 species. A common name for these fish in southern Indiana is pollywog.

== Characteristics ==
Species within the Etheostomatinae are all small fish, mostly less than 11 centimetres (4.3 in) in length, and their bodies are slightly compressed or fusiform in shape. They have two pterygiophores between the first and second dorsal fins which do not have spines and a reduced swimbladder which may be completely lacking. The common name "darter" owes to the behavior of the fish, which dart around their benthic habitat. They are sexually dimorphic; most species have males with bright colors and patterning, particularly when breeding. These colors and patterns are used to attract females and allow for recognition of species, as the colors and patterns are particular to each species. Many species use typical sites for spawning and they care for their eggs and fry. They have evolved a variety of methods of depositing eggs and these include burying them, which may be the basal habit as it is found in all genera, as well as attaching eggs to a substrate and egg clustering.

== Distribution ==
Etheostomatine darters are endemic to North America where they are found in the Mississippi River basin and the drainages of the Great Lakes, Hudson Bay, the seaboards of the Atlantic and the Gulf of Mexico and the Pacific coast of Mexico.

== Taxonomy ==
Eschmeyer's Catalog of Fishes recognises six genera as follows:

- Allohistium Bailey, 1955
- Ammocrypta Jordan, 1877
- Crystallaria Jordan & Gilbert, 1885
- Etheostoma Rafinesque, 1817
- Nothonotus Putnam, 1863
- Percina Haldeman, 1842

However, Fishbase places Crystallaria within the subfamily Percinae while the 5th Edition of Fishes of the World regard it as a subgenus of Ammocrypta and Nothonotus as a subgenus of Etheostoma.

== Life history and morphology ==
=== Phylogeny and diversity ===
Etheostomatinae, as a species rich and diverse sub-family within the family Percidae of freshwater ray-finned fishes, is composed of multiple genera including Ammocrypta, Crystalluria, Etheostoma, Nothonotus, and Percina, all of which have been observed as monophyletic groupings through molecular phylogenies.

Speciation events can occur to a culmination of factors as both sympatric and allopatric speciation is observed across darter evolutionary history. Factors related to spatiotemporal habitat stability and life history strategies can play into speciation and genetic differentiation of darters, such as dispersal ability and gene flow in headwater reproductive habitats impacting lineage divergence . It was seen that habitat preference and isolation is a major factor contributing to speciation in darters. Speciation events are common across species of this subfamily, one example includes Barcheek darters, an ancient monophyletic grouping residing in the eastern highlands which under time-calibrated molecular phylogenetic analysis of the mitochondrial genome has presented five novel cryptic species previously thought to be associated with Etheostoma basilare.

Hybridization has been accounted for multiple times across Etheostomatinae. It is more common between species with similar egg-laying behavioral mechanisms and within the same phylogenetic clade, with sperm viability being the limiting factor of hybridization. Sperm viability has also been witnessed to decrease as temperatures increase as an extraneous factor. Other factors impacting the viability of hybridization include life history of sympatry as opposed to allopatry, habitat preference, similar spawning periods, and duration of sperm viability. Species known to bury their eggs have been viewed to reproduce under sympatric conditions while egg-guarding species typically reproduce under allopatric conditions. Hybridization is predominantly found within species of large geographic ranges, larger populations, and egg-burying reproductive mechanisms.

=== Morphological features ===
Darters are composed of fusiform shaped bodies that are typically less than 11 centimeters in length, and characteristically host a reduced or lack an air bladder, allowing them to reside in benthic regions of lakes, streams, and rivers. A prominent feature across many species of darters is their diverse coloration. Color preferences have been found in common darter predators such as the largemouth bass, imposing selective pressures on certain species of darters limiting nuptial coloration. Chromatic species of darters are more prominent in fast flowing habitats with coarse substrate present within the water column and low flow accumulation, more light penetration, and fewer predators present. Species with blue fins are present in habitats supporting coarse substrate along with low flow accumulation, while blue body and red fins are commonly present in rifle ecosystems, and species with red coloration on the body are present in small streams.

The size of darters can be linked to increased fitness as larger darters tend to grow faster, produce more offspring, mature earlier at a larger size, and have longer lifespans along with reproductive lifespans. Diversity of life species traits across darters have been linked to influences such as reproductive behavior, geographic range, and population size of a species.

Coloration has been viewed to be heightened through ingestion of carotenoids, which could explain how coloration is phenotypically correlated to fitness across chromatic species of Etheostomatinae.

Another prominent feature held by females across darter lineage is the presence of gential papillae, fleshy protuberances between the anus and anal fin and are associated with egg laying abilities. Phylogenetic analyses expressed that the common ancestor of Etheostomatinae buried eggs with the help of tube-like appendage with a genital pore, a pore that releases the females eggs, held at the dorsal-posterior end known as tube papillae, leading researchers to believe this is the ancestral state of darters. Tube papillae are present in majority egg laying species across Etheostomatinae, with the exception of the genus Nothonotus, which instead have a mound-tube papillae allowing females to completely bury themselves as they lay eggs under the substrate. Egg clustering species tend to express complexes of pleated rosette papillae with ventral genital pores allowing the females to attach their eggs to the underhangs of rocks and other objects.

== Behavior ==
=== Egg laying and reproductive behavior ===
Selective traits may vary across species and genera, female darters have been observed to lay 500 to 1000 eggs sequentially, alluding to a promiscuous mating system with limited female mate preference and no parental care. Observations have been made that the majority of species across the diverse genus Etheostoma and that they attach eggs to their surroundings for protection. These egg attaching species mate when a female selects a location above the substrate such as a plant or rock where she will deposit her eggs, the male then mounts the female and as they vibrate the females attach eggs to her location of choosing while the male deposits sperm fertilizing the eggs. Other egg-laying behavioral characteristics include egg-guarding in which a female are courted by a male guarding a cavity, typically under flat stones, the couple then invert as the female lays eggs and the cavity ceiling as the male fertilizes them. When burying eggs, the male initiates with a courtship dance, in response the female wiggles until she is partially buried in the substrate. The male then mounts the female and similar to other species of darter, they vibrate as the females release eggs into her desired location while the male deposits sperm atop the eggs. Typically no parental care is associated with egg-burying species across the genus.

While parental care is not common within the darter subfamily, it has developed across the evolutionary history of Etheostomatinae multiple times, once in the clade Goneaperca, and a more novel evolutionarily derived clade Nothonotus. Male parental care across these clades have expressed evolutionary reversals back to the lack of care for their offspring multiple times. There are at least 250 species of darters across Etheostomatinae for which reproductive methodologies are known, with roughly 40 species experiencing paternal care and the rest showing no parental care at all.

=== Sexual selection ===
Males, while predominantly giving no parental care, do invest in courtship along with egg guarding among certain species. Intra-sexual and intersexual interactions affect speciation via sexual selection, predominantly via behavioral isolation through male aggression more so than female biases, likely due to the idea that males expending more energy into courtship reproduction than females. Male darters have been found to hold female preferences and mate choice and aggression correlated to their coloration differences expressing biases regarding intra and intersexual selection. Coloration has been viewed to be correlated more with male aggression as opposed to previously suggested female selective biases expressing that the color divergence is due to intra-sexual mechanisms in certain species lacking parental care, and that male coloration and aggressiveness may have coevolved. It has been viewed across species exhibiting parental care that achromatic coloration can be a trade off between paternal care and energy allocation for reproduction. Nuptial color preference has been observed across females of the darter species E. barrenses supporting the idea that female choice can drive the evolution of male coloration; while this may not apply to all species of darters, it does help support the general idea behind coloration and how it develops under the realm of sexual selection.
