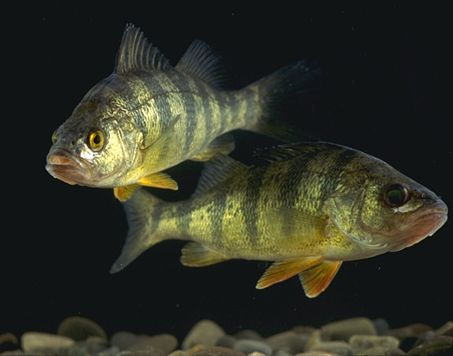
- Yellow perch (Perca flavescens)
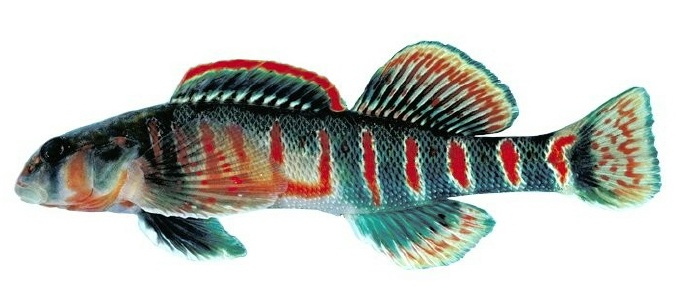
- Candy darter (Etheostoma osburni)

Scientific classification
- Kingdom: Animalia
- Phylum: Chordata
- Class: Actinopterygii
- Division: Teleostei
- Order: Perciformes
- Suborder: Percoidei
- Family: Percidae; Rafinesque, 1815

Subfamilies
- see text

= Percidae =

Percidae Temporal range: Middle Miocene–present

Family of fishes

The Percidae are a family of ray-finned fish, part of the order Perciformes, which are found in fresh and brackish waters of the Northern Hemisphere. The majority are Nearctic, but there are also Palearctic species. The family contains nearly 250 species in 12 genera. The perches and their relatives are in this family; well-known species include the walleye, sauger, ruffe, and three species of perch. However, small fish known as darters are also a part of this family.

Despite the widespread and speciose nature of this family, the vast majority of its species diversity is within the darters, which are restricted to eastern North America, and the majority of which have small ranges. Excluding the darters, this family contains only 20 species. In Europe, percids were likely a more ecologically dominant group in the past than now, with the immigration of cyprinids to Europe during the Miocene causing a decline in their importance.

== Characteristics ==
The family is characterised by having the dorsal fin split into two which are normally separated or have a narrow connection, although this is wider in the genus Zingel, the front section contains the spines and the rear section contains the soft rays. The anal fin contains 1 or 2 spines, if there is a second spine it is typically weak. The pelvic fins are placed on the thorax and have a single spine and 5 soft rays. They also have skeletal synapomorphies. The maximum size attained is 100 centimetres (39 in) in the zander (Sander lucioperca) but most of the species in the family are much smaller. Their scales are ctenoid and their bodies are normally somewhat elongate.

== Systematics ==
The following classification is based on Eschmeyer's Catalog of Fishes (2025):

- Subfamily Percinae Rafinesque, 1815
  - Genus Gymnocephalus Bloch, 1793
  - Genus Perca Linnaeus, 1758
  - Genus Percarina Nordmann, 1840
- Subfamily Luciopercinae Jordan & Evermann, 1896
  - Tribe Luciopercini Jordan & Evermann 1896
    - Genus Sander Oken, 1817
    - Genus †Leobergia Schtylko, 1934 (Neogene of eastern Europe)
  - Tribe Romanichthyini Dumitrescu, Bănărescu & Stoica 1957
    - Genus Romanichthys Dumitrescu, Bănărescu & Stoica 1957
    - Genus Zingel Cloquet, 1817
- Subfamily Etheostomatinae Agassiz, 1850
  - Genus Ammocrypta Jordan, 1877
  - Genus Etheostoma Rafinesque, 1817
  - Genus Nothonotus Putnam, 1863
  - Genus Percina Haldeman, 1842

Under a former treatment by the 5th Edition of Fishes of the World, Gymnocephalus was placed in its own subfamily, Acerinae, as was Percarina in Percarininae.

Although the family likely underwent an evolutionary radiation during the Paleogene, the earliest definitive fossil remains of percids are of modern Sander from the Middle Miocene of Canada. †Vixperca Peña Zarzuelo, 1991 from the Middle Eocene of Spain has been suggested to be the earliest known percid, but its remains are fragmentary and show closer similarities to lates perches than to true perches.
