= List of freshwater fishes of Maryland =

This is a list of freshwater fish living wild in the US state of Maryland.

== Bowfin (Amiidae) ==
- Bowfin (Amia calva)

== Catfishes (Ictaluridae) ==
- White catfish (Ameiurus catus)
- Yellow bullhead (Ameiurus natalis)
- Brown bullhead (Ameiurus nebulosus)
- Blue catfish (Ictalurus furcatus)
- Channel catfish (Ictalurus punctatus)
- Stonecat (Noturus flavus)
- Tadpole madtom (Noturus gyrinus)
- Margined madtom (Noturus insignis)
- Flathead catfish (Pylodictis olivaris)

== Eels (Anguillidae) ==
- American eel (Anguilla rostrata)

== Gars (Lepisosteidae) ==
- Longnose gar (Lepisosteus osseus)

== Herrings (Clupeidae) ==
- Blueback herring (Alosa aestivalis)
- Hickory shad (Alosa mediocris)
- Alewife (Alosa pseudoharengus)
- American shad (Alosa sapidissima)
- Gizzard shad (Dorosoma cepedianum)
- Threadfin shad (Dorosoma petenense)

== Killifishes (Fundulidae) ==
- Banded killifish (Fundulus diaphanus)
- Mummichog (Fundulus heteroclitus)
- Spotfin killifish (Fundulus luciae)
- Striped killifish (Fundulus majalis)
- Rainwater killifish (Lucania parva)

== Lampreys (Petromyzontidae) ==
- Least brook lamprey (Lampetra aepyptera)
- American brook lamprey (Lampetra appendix)
- Sea lamprey (Petromyzon marinus)

== Lotids (Lotidae) ==
- Burbot (Lota lota)

== Minnows (Cyprinidae) ==
- Central stoneroller (Campostoma anomalum)
- Goldfish (Carassius auratus) (introduced)
- Koi (Cyprinus rubrofuscus) (introduced)
- Redside dace (Clinostomus elongatus)
- Rosyside dace (Clinostomus funduloides)
- Grass carp (Ctenopharyngodon idella)
- Satinfin shiner (Cyprinella analostana)
- Spotfin shiner (Cyprinella spiloptera)
- Common carp (Cyprinus carpio)
- Cutlips minnow (Exoglossum maxillingua)
- Eastern silvery minnow (Hybognathus regius)
- Striped shiner (Luxilus chrysocephalus)
- Common shiner (Luxilus cornutus)
- Allegheny pearl dace (Margariscus margarita)
- River chub (Nocomis micropogon)
- Golden shiner (Notemigonus crysoleucas)
- Comely shiner (Notropis amoenus)
- Emerald shiner (Notropis atherinoides)
- Bridle shiner (Notropis bifrenatus)
- Silverjaw minnow (Notropis buccatus)
- Ironcolor shiner (Notropis chalybaeus)
- Spottail shiner (Notropis hudsonius)
- Swallowtail shiner (Notropis procne)
- Rosyface shiner (Notropis rubellus)
- Cheat minnow (Pararhinichthys bowersi)
- Bluntnose minnow (Pimephales notatus)
- Fathead minnow (Pimephales promelas)
- Eastern blacknose dace (Rhinichthys atratulus)
- Longnose dace (Rhinichthys cataractae)
- Common rudd (Scardinius erythropthalmus) (introduced)
- Creek chub (Semotilus atromaculatus)
- Fallfish (Semotilus corporalis)
- Tench (Tinca tinca) (introduced)

== Mudminnows (Umbridae) ==
- Eastern mudminnow (Umbra pygmaea)

== Perches (Percidae) ==
- Greenside darter (Etheostoma blennioides)
- Rainbow darter (Etheostoma caeruleum)
- Fantail darter (Etheostoma flabellare)
- Swamp darter (Etheostoma fusiforme)
- Johnny darter (Etheostoma nigrum)
- Tessellated darter (Etheostoma olmstedi)
- Maryland darter (Etheostoma sellare)
- Glassy darter (Etheostoma vitreum)
- Banded darter (Etheostoma zonale)
- Yellow perch (Perca flavescens)
- Common logperch (Percina caprodes)
- Stripeback darter (Percina notogramma)
- Shield darter (Percina peltata)
- Walleye (Sander vitreum) (introduced)

== Percopsids (Percopsidae) ==
- Trout-perch (Percopsis omiscomaycus)

== Pikes (Esocidae) ==
- Redfin pickerel (Esox americanus)
- Northern pike (Esox lucius)
- Muskellunge (Esox masquinongy)
- Tiger muskellunge (Esox masquinongy X Esox lucius)
- Chain pickerel (Esox niger)

== Pirate perch (Aphredoderidae) ==
- Pirate perch (Aphredoderus sayanus)

== Poeciliids (Poeciliidae) ==
- Eastern mosquitofish (Gambusia holbrooki)

== Pupfish (Cyprinodontidae) ==
- Sheepshead minnow (Cyprinodon variegatus)

== Sculpins (Cottidae) ==
- Mottled sculpin (Cottus bairdii)
- Blue Ridge sculpin (Cottus caeruleomentum)

== Silversides (Atherinopsidae) ==
- Rough silverside (Membras martinica)
- Inland silverside (Menidia beryllina)
- Atlantic silverside (Menidia menidia)

== Smelts (Osmeridae) ==
- Rainbow smelt (Osmerus mordax)

== Snakeheads (Channidae) ==
- Northern snakehead (introduced)

== Sticklebacks (Gasterosteidae) ==
- Fourspine stickleback (Apeltes quadracus)
- Brook stickleback (Culaea inconstans)
- Threespine stickleback (Gasterosteus aculeatus)

== Sturgeons (Acipenseridae) ==
- Shortnose sturgeon (Acipenser brevirostrum)
- Atlantic sturgeon (Acipenser oxyrhinchus)

== Suckers (Catostomidae) ==
- Quillback (Carpiodes cyprinus)
- Longnose sucker (Catostomus catostomus)
- White sucker (Catostomus commersoni)
- Creek chubsucker (Erimyzon oblongus)
- Northern hogsucker (Hypentelium nigricans)
- Golden redhorse (Moxostoma erythrurum)
- Shorthead redhorse (Moxostoma macrolepidotum)

== Sunfishes (Centrarchidae) ==
- Mud sunfish (Acantharcus pomotis)
- Rock bass (Amblopites rupestris)
- Flier (Centrarchus macropterus)
- Blackbanded sunfish (Enneacanthus chaetodon)
- Bluespotted sunfish (Enneacanthus gloriosus)
- Banded sunfish (Enneacanthus obesus)
- Redbreast sunfish (Lepomis auritus)
- Green sunfish (Lepomis cyanellus)
- Pumpkinseed (Lepomis gibbosus)
- Pumpkingill (Lepomis gibbosus x macrochirus)
- Warmouth (Lepomis gulosus)
- Bluegill (Lepomis macrochirus)
- Greengill sunfish (Lepomis macrochirus x cyanellus)
- Longear sunfish (Lepomis megalotis)
- Redear sunfish (Lepomis microlophus)
- Smallmouth bass (Micropterus dolomieu)
- Largemouth bass (Micropterus salmoides)
- White crappie (Pomoxis annularis)
- Black crappie (Pomoxis nigromaculatus)

== Temperate basses (Moronidae) ==
- White perch (Morone americana)
- Striped bass (Morone saxatilis)

== Trout and whitefish (Salmonidae) ==
- Cutthroat trout (Oncorhynchus clarki)
- Rainbow trout (Oncorhynchus mykiss)
- Brown trout (Salmo trutta)
- Brook trout (Salvelinus fontinalis)
- Lake trout (Salvelinus namaycush)
- Lake herring (Coregonus artedi)
