= List of fishes of West Virginia =

The state of West Virginia has a wide variety of freshwater fish species in its rivers, lakes, and streams. 20% of these species are sportfish, and the remaining 80% are nongame species.

== The taxa ==
The following letters indicate the river systems that contain each species:

O	Ohio River Basin	Includes the Ohio, Monongahela, Little Kanawha, Kanawha, Guyandotte, and Big Sandy Rivers.
N	New River Basin	Includes the New and Gauley Rivers.
P	Potomac River Basin	Includes the Potomac River.
J	James River Basin	Includes the James

In addition, the IUCN classifies one of these species as critically endangered CR, one as endangered EN, five as vulnerable VU, and three as near-threatened NT.

=== Order Petromyzontiformes (lampreys) ===
Family Petromyzontidae (northern lampreys)

- Ohio lamprey (Ichthyomyzon bdellium) O, rare
- Northern brook lamprey (Ichthyomyzon fossor) O, rare
- Mountain brook lamprey (Ichthyomyzon greeleyi) O, rare
- Silver lamprey (Ichthyomyzon unicuspis) O, rare
- Least brook lamprey (Lampetra aepyptera) O, N
- American brook lamprey (Lethenteron appendix) O, rare

=== Order Acipenseriformes (sturgeons and paddlefish) ===
Family Acipenseridae (sturgeons)

- Lake sturgeon (Acipenser fulvescens) O, extinct in West Virginia
- Shovelnose sturgeon (Scaphirhynchus platorynchus) O, VU

Family Polyodontidae (paddlefishes)

- American paddlefish (Polyodon spathula) O, rare, VU

=== Order Lepisosteiformes (gars) ===
Family Lepisosteidae (gars)

- Longnose gar (Lepisosteus osseus) O

=== Order Amiiformes (bowfin) ===
Family Amiidae (bowfin)

- Bowfin (Amia calva) O, rare

=== Order Hiodontiformes (mooneyes) ===
Family Hiodontidae (mooneyes)

- Goldeye (Hiodon alosoides) O, rare
- Mooneye (Hiodon tergisus) O

=== Order Anguilliformes (eels) ===
Family Anguillidae (freshwater eels)

- American eel (Anguilla rostrata) O, N, P, EN

=== Order Clupeiformes (herrings and relatives) ===
Family Clupeidae (herrings, shads, and relatives)

- Skipjack shad (Alosa chrysochloris) O
- Alewife (Alosa pseudoharengus) O, N, P
- American gizzard shad (Dorosoma cepedianum) O
- Threadfin shad (Dorosoma petenense) O

=== Order Cypriniformes (carps, minnows, and relatives) ===
Family Cyprinidae (carps, true minnows, and relatives)

- Central stoneroller (Campostoma anomalum) O, N, P, J
- Goldfish (Carassius auratus) O, N, P, introduced
- Redside dace (Clinostomus elongatus) O, rare
- Rosyside dace (Clinostomus funduloides) O, N, P, J
- Satinfin shiner (Cyprinella analostana) P, rare
- Whitetail shiner (Cyprinella galactura) O, N
- Spotfin shiner (Cyprinella spiloptera) O, N, P
- Steelcolor shiner (Cyprinella whipplei) O
- Common carp (Cyprinus carpio) O, N, P, introduced, VU
- Grass carp (Ctenopharyngodon idella) O, N, P
- Bighead carp (Hypopthalmichthys nobilis) O
- Streamline chub (Erimystax dissimilis) O, N
- Tonguetied minnow (Exoglossum laurae) O, N, rare
- Cutlips minnow (Exoglossum maxillingua) N, P, J
- Eastern silvery minnow (Hybognathus regius) P, rare
- Mississippi silvery minnow (Hybognathus nuchalis) O, extinct in West Virginia
- Bigeye chub (Hybopsis amblops) O
- White shiner (Luxilus albeolus) O, N
- Striped shiner (Luxilus chrysocephalus) O, N, P
- Common shiner (Luxilus cornutus) O, P, J
- Rosefin shiner (Lythrurus ardens) J, rare
- Scarlet shiner (Lythrurus fasciolaris) O, rare
- Redfin shiner (Lythrurus umbratilis) O
- Shoal chub (Macrhybopsis hyostoma) O
- Silver chub (Macrhybopsis storeriana) O
- Allegheny pearl dace (Margariscus margarita) O, P, rare
- Hornyhead chub (Nocomis biguttatus) O, extinct in West Virginia
- Bluehead chub (Nocomis leptocephalus) N, P, J
- River chub (Nocomis micropogon) O, P, J
- Bigmouth chub (Nocomis platyrhynchus) N
- Golden shiner (Notemigonus crysoleucas) O, N, P, J
- Comely shiner (Notropis amoenus) P
- Popeye shiner (Notropis ariommus) O, rare
- Emerald shiner (Notropis atherinoides) O, N, P
- River shiner (Notropis blennius) O
- Bigeye shiner (Notropis boops) O, rare
- Ghost shiner (Notropis buchanani) O
- Bigmouth shiner (Notropis dorsalis) O, extinct in West Virginia
- Spottail shiner (Notropis hudsonius) O, N, P
- Sand shiner (Notropis stramineus) O, N
- Silver shiner (Notropis photogenis) O, N
- Swallowtail shiner (Notropis procne) P
- Rosyface shiner (Notropis rubellus) O, N, P, J
- New River shiner (Notropis scabriceps) N, rare
- Telescope shiner (Notropis telescopus) O, N, J
- Mimic shiner (Notropis volucellus) O, N, P
- Channel shiner (Notropis wickliffi) O
- Silverjaw minnow (Ericymba buccata) O, N, P
- Pugnose minnow (Opsopoeodus emiliae) O, extinct in West Virginia
- Suckermouth minnow (Phenacobius mirabilis) O
- Kanawha minnow (Phenacobius teretulus) N, rare
- Southern redbelly dace (Chrosomus erythrogaster) O
- Mountain redbelly dace (Chrosomus oreas) O, N, J
- Bluntnose minnow (Pimephales notatus) O, N, P
- Fathead minnow (Pimephales promelas) O, N, P
- Bullhead minnow (Pimephales vigilax) O, rare
- Eastern blacknose dace (Rhinichthys atratulus) O, P, J
- Western blacknose dace (Rhinichthys obtusus) O, N
- Cheat minnow (Pararhinichthys bowersi) O, rare
- Longnose dace (Rhinichthys cataractae) O, N, P, J
- Common rudd (Scardinius erythrophthalmus) N
- Creek chub (Semotilus atromaculatus) O, N, P, J
- Fallfish (Semotilus corporalis) P

Family Catostomidae (suckers)

- River carpsucker (Carpiodes carpio) O
- Quillback (Carpiodes cyprinus) O
- Highfin carpsucker (Carpiodes velifer) O, rare
- Longnose sucker (Catostomus catostomus) O, extinct in West Virginia
- White sucker (Catostomus commersonii) O, N, P, J
- Blue sucker (Cycleptus elongatus) O, rare
- Creek chubsucker (Erimyzon oblongus) P
- Northern hogsucker (Hypentelium nigricans) O, N, P, J
- Smallmouth buffalo (Ictiobus bubalus) O
- Bigmouth buffalo (Ictiobus cyprinellus) O, rare
- Black buffalo (Ictiobus niger) O, rare
- Spotted sucker (Minytrema melanops) O
- Silver redhorse (Moxostoma anisurum) O
- River redhorse (Moxostoma carinatum) O
- Black redhorse (Moxostoma duquesnei) O
- Golden redhorse (Moxostoma erythrurum) O, N, P
- Smallmouth redhorse (Moxostoma breviceps) O
- Shorthead redhorse (Moxostoma macrolepidotum) P, rare
- Torrent sucker (Thoburnia rhothoeca) N, P

=== Order Siluriformes (catfishes) ===
Family Ictaluridae (ictalurid catfishes)

- White bullhead (Ameiurus catus) O
- Black bullhead (Ameiurus melas) O, N
- Yellow bullhead (Ameiurus natalis) O, N, P
- Brown bullhead (Ameiurus nebulosus) O, N, P
- Blue catfish (Ictalurus furcatus) O
- Channel catfish (Ictalurus punctatus) O, N, P
- Mountain madtom (Noturus eleutherus) O, rare
- Stonecat (Noturus flavus) O, N
- Margined madtom (Noturus insignis) O, N, P, J
- Brindled madtom (Noturus miurus) O
- Northern madtom (Noturus stigmosus) O, rare, NT
- Flathead catfish (Pylodictis olivaris) O, N

=== Order Esociformes (pikes and mudminnows) ===
Family Esocidae (pikes)

- Redfin pickerel (Esox a. americanus) O, P, rare
- Grass pickerel (Esox americanus vermiculatus) O, rare
- Northern pike (Esox lucius) O, P
- Muskellunge (Esox masquinongy) O, N, P
- Tiger muskellunge (Esox masquinongy x lucius) O, N, P
- Chain pickerel (Esox niger) O, N, P

Family Umbridae (mudminnows)

- Central mudminnow (Umbra limi) O

=== Order Salmoniformes (trout) ===
Family Salmonidae (trout)

- Cutthroat trout (Oncorhynchus clarkii) P, introduced
- Rainbow trout (Oncorhynchus mykiss) O, N, P, J, introduced
- Brown trout (Salmo trutta) O, N, J, P, introduced
- Brook trout (Salvelinus fontinalis) O, N, J, P

=== Order Percopsiformes (trout-perch) ===
Family Percopsidae (trout-perch)

- Trout-perch (Percopsis omiscomaycus) O

=== Order Cyprinodontiformes (toothcarps) ===
Family Fundulidae (topminnows)

- Northern studfish (Fundulus catenatus) O
- Banded killifish (Fundulus diaphanus) O, P, rare
- Mummichog (Fundulus heteroclitus) P

Family Poeciliidae (livebearers)

- Mosquitofish (Gambusia affinis) O, N, P

=== Order Atheriniformes (silversides) ===
Family Atherinopsidae (neotropical silversides)

- Brook silverside (Labidesthes sicculus) O, N, P

=== Order Gasterosteiformes (sticklebacks) ===
Family Gasterosteidae (sticklebacks)

- Brook stickleback (Culaea inconstans) O

=== Order Scorpaeniformes (mail-cheeked fishes) ===
Family Cottidae (sculpins)

- Mottled sculpin (Cottus bairdii) O, N, J
- Blue Ridge sculpin (Cottus caeruleomentum) P, J
- Slimy sculpin (Cottus cognatus) P, rare
- Potomac sculpin (Cottus girardi) P
- Kanawha sculpin (Cottus kanawhae) N, rare
- Bluestone sculpin (Cottus sp.) N

=== Order Perciformes (sunfishes and perches) ===
Family Moronidae (temperate basses)

- White perch (Morone americana) O
- White bass (Morone chrysops) O, N
- Striped bass (Morone saxatilis) O, N
- Hybrid striped bass (Morone chrysops x saxatilis) O

Family Centrarchidae (sunfishes)

- Rock bass (Ambloplites rupestris) O, N, J, P
- Redbreast sunfish (Lepomis auritus) O, N, J, P
- Green sunfish (Lepomis cyanellus) O, N, J, P
- Pumpkinseed (Lepomis gibbosus) O, N, J, P
- Warmouth (Lepomis gulosus) O, P
- Orangespotted sunfish (Lepomis humilis) O
- Bluegill (Lepomis macrochirus) O, N, J, P
- Longear sunfish (Lepomis megalotis) O, N, P
- Redear sunfish (Lepomis microlophus) O
- Smallmouth bass (Micropterus dolomieu) O, N, J, P
- Spotted bass (Micropterus punctulatus) O, N
- Largemouth bass (Micropterus salmoides) O, N, J, P
- White crappie (Pomoxis annularis) O, N, P
- Black crappie (Pomoxis nigromaculatus) O, N, P

Family Percidae (perches, darters, and relatives)

- Eastern sand darter (Ammocrypta pellucida) O
- Western sand darter (Ammocrypta clara) O, rare, VU
- Diamond darter (Crystallaria cincotta) O, rare, CR
- Greenside darter (Etheostoma blennioides) O, N, P
- Rainbow darter (Etheostoma caeruleum) O, N, P
- Bluebreast darter (Etheostoma camurum) O
- Fantail darter (Etheostoma flabellare) O, N, P, J
- Longfin darter (Etheostoma longimanum) J, rare
- Spotted darter (Etheostoma maculatum) O, rare, VU
- Johnny darter (Etheostoma nigrum) O, N, J
- Tessellated darter (Etheostoma olmstedi) P
- Candy darter (Etheostoma osburni) N, rare, NT
- Snubnose darter (Etheostoma simoterum) N
- Tippecanoe darter (Etheostoma tippecanoe) O, NT
- Variegate darter (Etheostoma variatum) O, N
- Banded darter (Etheostoma zonale) O
- Yellow perch (Perca flavescens) O, N, P
- Common logperch (Percina caprodes) O, N
- Channel darter (Percina copelandi) O
- Gilt darter (Percina evides) O, rare
- Appalachia darter (Percina gymnocephala) N, rare
- Longhead darter (Percina macrocephala) O, rare
- Blackside darter (Percina maculata) O, N
- Stripeback darter (Percina notogramma) J, rare
- Sharpnose darter (Percina oxyrhynchus) O, N
- Shield darter (Percina peltata) P
- Slenderhead darter (Percina phoxocephala) O
- Roanoke darter (Percina roanoka) N
- Dusky darter (Percina sciera) O
- River darter (Percina shumardi) O, rare
- Sauger (Sander canadensis) O
- Walleye (Sander vitreus) O, N, P
- Saugeye (Sander canadensis x vitreus) O

Family Sciaenidae (drums)

- Freshwater drum (Aplodinotus grunniens) O

== List of West Virginia fishes by spawning temperature ==
=== Data table ===
Species	Lower bound temperature (C)	Lower bound temperature (F)	Upper bound temperature (C)	Upper bound temperature (F)	Notes
Acipenser fulvescens	13°	55°	18°	64°	
Alosa chrysochloris	16	60.8	21	70	
Amia calva	16°	61°	19°	66°	
Ctenopharyngodon idella	20	68	30	86	
Ichthyomyzon greeleyi	18.9°	66°			
Ichthyomyzon unicuspis	10°	50°			
Lepisosteus osseus	20°	68°			
Lethenteron appendix	15°	59°			
Luxilus cornutus	16	61	26	79	
Macrhybopsis storeriana	19	66			
Notropis atherinoides	22.2	72			Females in Canada have a wider range of preferred breeding temperatures.
Nocomis micropogon	16		19		
Notropis procne	25.6	78.1			
Notropis stramineus	27	81	37	99	
Pimephales promelas	18	64			
Polyodon spathula	13°	55°	16°	60°	
Rhinichthys cataractae	14	57	19	66	
Carpiodes carpio	18.3	65	19.1	66.4	
Carpiodes cyprinus	7	44.6	18	64.4	
Carpiodes velifer	17	63			
Cycleptus elongatus	12	53			
Erimyzon oblongus	12	53.6	24	75.2	
Hypentelium nigricans	15	59			
Ictiobus cyprinellus	13	55.4	26	78.8	
Ictiobus niger	19	66.2	24	75.2	
Minytrema melanops	12	53.6	19	66.2	
Moxostoma anisurum	11.7	53			
Moxostoma duquesnei	15	59	21	69.8	
Moxostoma erythrurum	17	62.6	22	71.6	
Moxostoma macrolepidotum	7	44.6	16	60.8	
Ameiurus catus	18.3	65	23.9	75	
Noturus flavus	25	77			
Noturus stigmosus	23	73.4			In Canada, the juveniles are found mainly in areas with a water temperature between 19.5 and 28 °C.
Esox americanus americanus	4	39	18.3	65	
Esox lucius	9	48			
Umbra limi	13	55.4			

== See also ==
- West Virginia State Wildlife Center, a small zoo featuring native West Virginia animals
- Fauna of West Virginia
- List of West Virginia wildlife management areas
