= List of fishes of Minnesota =

There are about 123 species of fishes found naturally in Minnesota waters, including Lake Superior. The following list is based on the Minnesota Department of Natural Resources.

The species data on this page is taken from the Minnesota DNR, which also uses several labels to indicate a fish's status within Minnesota waters. An endangered fish species is near extinction in Minnesota, a threatened species is likely to become endangered within the foreseeable future, and a special concern species is either extremely uncommon in Minnesota or has unique or highly specific habitat requirements.

Several types of Minnesota fish are considered non-native invasive species. A prohibited invasive species is illegal to possess in Minnesota without a permit, and a regulated invasive species is legal to possess but still may not be released into public waters. Many invasive fish species are nonetheless already well-established.

== Coldwater sport fish ==
- Atlantic salmon, Salmo salar
- Bloater, Coregonus hoyi
- Brook trout, Salvelinus fontinalis
- Brown trout, Salmo trutta
- Chinook salmon, Oncorhynchus tshawytscha
- Cisco, Coregonus artedi (may be referred to as tulibee or lake herring)
- Coho salmon, Oncorhynchus kisutch
- Kiyi, Coregonus kiyi (special concern)
- Lake trout, Salvelinus namaycush
- Lake whitefish, Coregonus clupeaformis
- Pink salmon, Oncorhynchus gorbuscha
- Pygmy whitefish, Prosopium coulterii
- Rainbow smelt, Osmerus mordax (regulated invasive)
- Rainbow trout, Oncorhynchus mykiss
- Round whitefish, Prosopium cylindraceum
- Shortjaw cisco, Coregonus zenithicus (special concern)

== Legal game fish ==
- American paddlefish, Polyodon spathula (threatened)
- Black bullhead, Ameiurus melas
- Black crappie, Pomoxis nigromaculatus
- Blue catfish, Ictalurus furcatus
- Bluegill, Lepomis macrochirus
- Blue sucker, Cycleptus elongatus (special concern)
- Brown bullhead, Ameiurus nebulosus
- Burbot, Lota lota (may be referred to as eelpout, ling, or lawyer)
- Channel catfish, Ictalurus punctatus
- Flathead catfish, Pylodictis olivaris
- Green sunfish, Lepomis cyanellus
- Lake sturgeon, Acipenser fulvescens (special concern)
- Largemouth bass, Micropterus salmoides
- Longear sunfish, Lepomis megalotis
- Muskellunge, Esox masquinongy
- Northern pike, Esox lucius
- Pumpkinseed, Lepomis gibbosus
- Rock bass, Ambloplites rupestris
- Sauger, Sander canadense
- Shovelnose sturgeon, Scaphirhynchus platorynchus
- Smallmouth bass, Micropterus dolomieu
- Walleye, Sander vitreus
- Warmouth, Lepomis gulosus
- White bass, Morone chrysops
- White crappie, Pomoxis annularis
- White perch, Morone americana (prohibited invasive)
- Yellow bass, Morone mississippiensis (special concern)
- Yellow bullhead, Ameiurus natalis
- Yellow perch, Perca flavescens

== Other sport fish ==
- American eel, Anguilla rostrata
- Bigmouth buffalo, Ictiobus cyprinellus
- Black buffalo, Ictiobus niger (special concern)
- Black redhorse, Moxostoma duquesnei
- Bowfin, Amia calva (may be referred to as dogfish)
- Common carp, Cyprinus carpio (regulated invasive)
- Creek chub, Semotilus atromaculatus
- Freshwater drum, Aplodinotus grunniens (may be referred to as sheepshead)
- Gizzard shad, Dorosoma cepedianum
- Golden redhorse, Moxostoma erythrurum
- Goldeye, Hiodon alosoides
- Goldfish, Carassius auratus (regulated invasive)
- Greater redhorse, Moxostoma valenciennesi
- Highfin carpsucker, Carpiodes velifer
- Longnose gar, Lepisosteus osseus
- Longnose sucker, Catostomus catostomus
- Mooneye, Hiodon tergisus
- Northern hogsucker, Hypentelium nigricans
- Quillback, Carpiodes cyprinus
- River carpsucker, Carpiodes carpio
- River redhorse, Moxostoma carinatum
- Shorthead redhorse, Moxostoma macrolepidotum
- Shortnose gar, Lepisosteus platostomus
- Silver redhorse, Moxostoma anisurum
- Smallmouth buffalo, Ictiobus bubalus
- Spotted sucker, Minytrema melanops
- White sucker, Catostomus commersoni

== Non-game fish ==
- Alewife, Alosa pseudoharengus (prohibited invasive)
- Allegheny pearl dace, Margariscus margarita
- American brook lamprey, Lampetra appendix
- Banded darter, Etheostoma zonale
- Banded killifish, Fundulus diaphanus
- Bighead carp, Hypophthalmichthys nobilis (prohibited invasive)
- Bigmouth shiner, Notropis dorsalis
- Blackchin shiner, Notropis heterodon
- Blacknose shiner, Notropis heterolepis
- Blackside darter, Percina maculata
- Bluntnose darter, Etheostoma chlorosoma
- Bluntnose minnow, Pimephales notatus
- Brassy minnow, Hybognathus hankinsoni
- Brook silverside, Labidesthes sicculus
- Brook stickleback, Culaea inconstans
- Bullhead minnow, Pimephales vigilax
- Central mudminnow, Umbra limi
- Central stoneroller, Campostoma anomalum
- Chestnut lamprey, Ichthyomyzon castaneus
- Common logperch, Percina caprodes
- Common shiner, Luxilus cornutus
- Crystal darter, Crystallaria asprella (special concern)
- Deepwater sculpin, Myoxocephalus thompsoni
- Eastern blacknose dace, Rhinichthys atratulus
- Emerald shiner, Notropis atherinoides
- Fantail darter, Etheostoma flabellare
- Fathead minnow, Pimephales promelas
- Finescale dace, Phoxinus neogaeus
- Flathead chub, Platygobio gracilis
- Fourspine stickleback, Apeltes quadracus
- Gilt darter, Percina evides (special concern)
- Golden shiner, Notemigonus crysoleucas
- Grass carp, Ctenopharyngodon idella (prohibited invasive)
- Gravel chub, Erimystax x-punctatus (special concern)
- Hornyhead chub, Nocomis biguttatus
- Iowa darter, Etheostoma exile
- Lake chub, Couesius plumbeus
- Largescale stoneroller, Campostoma oligolepis
- Johnny darter, Etheostoma nigrum
- Least darter, Etheostoma microperca (special concern)
- Longnose dace, Rhinichthys cataractae
- Mimic shiner, Notropis volucellus
- Mississippi silvery minnow, Hybognathus nuchalis
- Mottled sculpin, Cottus bairdi (may be referred to as muddler minnow)
- Mud darter, Etheostoma asprigene
- Ninespine stickleback, Pungitius pungitius
- Northern brook lamprey, Ichthyomyzon fossor (special concern)
- Northern pearl dace, Margariscus nachtriebi
- Northern redbelly dace, Phoxinus eos
- Orangespotted sunfish, Lepomis humilis
- Ozark minnow, Notropis nubilus (special concern)
- Pallid shiner, Hybopsis amnis (special concern)
- Pirate perch, Aphredoderus sayanus (special concern)
- Plains topminnow, Fundulus sciadicus (special concern)
- Pugnose minnow, Opsopoeodus emiliae (special concern)
- Pugnose shiner, Notropis anogenus
- Rainbow darter, Etheostoma caeruleum
- Redfin shiner, Lythrurus umbratilis
- Red shiner, Cyprinella lutrensis
- Redside dace, Clinostomus elongatus
- River darter, Percina shumardi
- River shiner, Notropis blennius
- Rosyface shiner, Notropis rubellus
- Round goby, Neogobius melanostomus (prohibited invasive)
- Ruffe, Gymnocephalus cernuus (prohibited invasive)
- Sand shiner, Notropis stramineus
- Sea lamprey, Petromyzon marinus (prohibited invasive)
- Silver carp, Hypophthalmichthys molitrix (prohibited invasive)
- Silver chub, Macrhybopsis storeriana or Hybopsis storeriana
- Silver lamprey, Ichthyomyzon unicuspis
- Skipjack herring, Alosa chrysochloris (special concern)
- Slenderhead darter, Percina phoxocephala
- Slender madtom, Noturus exilis (endangered)
- Slimy sculpin, Cottus cognatus
- Southern brook lamprey, Ichthyomyzon gagei (special concern)
- Southern redbelly dace, Phoxinus erythrogaster
- Speckled chub, Macrhybopsis aestivalis or Hybopsis aestivalis
- Spoonhead sculpin, Cottus ricei
- Spotfin shiner, Cyprinella spiloptera
- Spottail shiner, Notropis hudsonius
- Starhead topminnow, Fundulus dispar
- Stonecat, Noturus flavus
- Suckermouth minnow, Phenacobius mirabilis
- Tadpole madtom, Noturus gyrinus
- Threespine stickleback, Gasterosteus aculeatus
- Topeka shiner, Notropis topeka (special concern)
- Trout-perch, Percopsis omiscomaycus
- Weed shiner, Notropis texanus
- Western blacknose dace, Rhinichthys obtusus
- Western sand darter, Ammocrypta clara
- Western tubenose goby, Proterorhinus semilunaris

== Invasive species not currently in Minnesota ==
According to the DNR, these prohibited or regulated invasive fish species threaten Minnesota natural resources but are not currently known to be in Minnesota public waters.

- Black carp, Mylopharyngodon piceus (prohibited invasive)
- Rudd, Scardinius erythrophthalmus (prohibited invasive)
- Tilapia, Oreochromis, Sarotherodon, and Tilapia spp. (regulated invasive)
- Zander, Stizostedion lucioperca (prohibited invasive)

== See also ==
- List of rivers of Minnesota
- List of lakes of Minnesota
- List of fish families
- List of U.S. state fish
- List of fish common names
