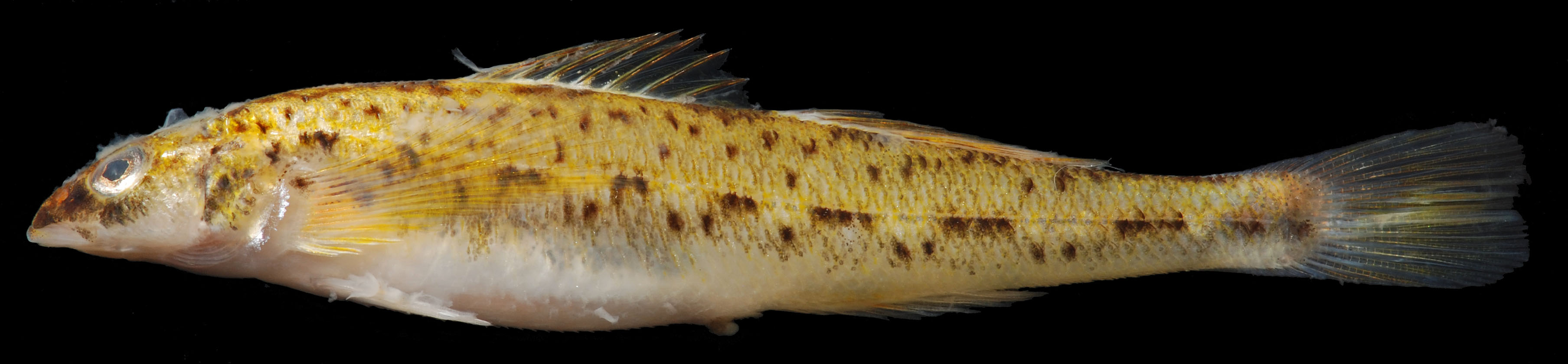

Conservation status
- Least Concern (IUCN 3.1)

Scientific classification
- Kingdom: Animalia
- Phylum: Chordata
- Class: Actinopterygii
- Order: Perciformes
- Family: Percidae
- Genus: Etheostoma
- Species: E. vitreum

Binomial name
- Etheostoma vitreum Cope, 1870

Synonyms
- Poecilichthys vitreus Cope, 1870

= Glassy darter =

Species of fish

The glassy darter (Etheostoma vitreum) is a species of freshwater ray-finned fish, a darter from the subfamily Etheostomatinae, part of the family Percidae, which also contains the perches, ruffes and pikeperches. It is found from the Bush River in Maryland to Neuse River in North Carolina. It inhabits sandy runs of creeks and small to medium rivers. This species can reach a length of 6.6 cm (2.6 in), though most only reach about 4.7 cm (1.9 in).
