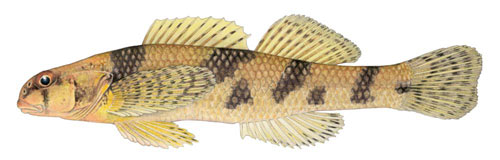

Conservation status
- Extinct (IUCN 3.1)

- Endangered (ESA)

Scientific classification
- Kingdom: Animalia
- Phylum: Chordata
- Class: Actinopterygii
- Order: Perciformes
- Family: Percidae
- Genus: Etheostoma
- Subgenus: †Mooreichthys
- Species: †E. sellare

Binomial name
- †Etheostoma sellare (Radcliffe & W. W. Welsh, 1913)

Synonyms
- Hadropterus sellaris Radcliffe & Welsh, 1913

= Maryland darter =

Extinct species of fish

The Maryland darter (Etheostoma sellare) is a species of freshwater ray-finned fish, a darter from the subfamily Etheostomatinae, part of the family Percidae, which also contains the perches, ruffes and pikeperches. It is considered one of the rarest freshwater fish species in the world, due in part to its extremely limited geographic range and difficulty of detection. The last sighting of one was in 1988. The Maryland darter is named after the only state in which it is known to occur. The species was long known only by two specimens until being "re-discovered" in 1962. From 1965 into the 1980s, the species was believed to have been confined to a single riffle in Deer Creek. Possible explanations for the decline of the species center around widespread habitat degradation and reduction in water quality resulting from increasing rates of urbanization within the watershed. While the IUCN has declared the species extinct, the United States Fish and Wildlife Service has not, and keeps it on the Endangered Species List.

== History ==
The Maryland darter was originally discovered in 1912 in Swan Creek, a tributary of the larger Susquehanna River drainage basin located near Havre de Grace, Maryland. The two biologists responsible for the discovery, Lewis Radcliffe and William W. Welsh, promptly published a description of the newly discovered species in 1913. Despite initial detection of the species in Swan Creek, it was never found there again. However, in 1962 the Maryland darter was "re-discovered" after an adult female specimen was collected in nearby Gasheys Run, a tributary of Swan Creek. Perhaps the most significant detection of the Maryland darter occurred in 1965, when over 70 individuals were collected from Deer Creek. Additional sightings of the species in Deer Creek occurred irregularly between 1974 and 1988, where between 1 and 10 individuals were detected by seining sampling or snorkeling. However, the last significant sighting of the Maryland darter occurred in 1988. It has not been seen since, and is believed to be extinct. This species is the only member of the subgenus Mooreichthys.

== Characteristics ==
The Maryland darter is a member of the genus Etheostoma and a member of the darter subfamily of fishes. A relative of the yellow perch (Perca flavescens) and walleye (Sander vitreus), the Maryland darter is a bottom-dwelling fish. Ideal habitat consists of highly oxygenated, swiftly flowing portions of streams containing moderate amounts of vegetation and characterized by rubble and gravel-like substrate. Additionally, the species favors sloped rock riffles and crevasses which provide ample shelter from predators. The Maryland darter is a relatively smaller darter species with a maximum size of just under three inches. The species favors small invertebrates, frequently foraging on small snails, caddis fly larvae and mayfly and stonefly nymphs. Spawning presumably occurs in late April as is characteristic of most other darter species, however the Maryland darter has never been observed during reproduction.

== Species status ==
The Maryland darter is listed as endangered by the United States Fish and Wildlife Service. The United States Fish and Wildlife Service has determined that due to difficulty of detection, in spite of infrequent observations since initial discovery in 1912, that there is not sufficient evidence to declare the species extinct. However, other organizations such as the IUCN has listed the Maryland darter as extinct on the IUCN list of threatened species. The state of Maryland has the species listed as SH, indicating that, historically, the species occurred in the state but is believed to be extirpated, having not been observed for a period of over 20 years.

The Maryland Darter is seemingly becoming extinct due to the high quantities of pollution from agricultural and development runoff. We can determine that sediment from erosion and runoff reduced water quality and may have smothered darter eggs. Erratic water levels created sedimentation problems; stranding fish in pools. These pools could become too warm for them to survive, which increases predation by other fish.

== Recovery efforts ==
The Maryland Darter Recovery Plan is a plan implemented by the Wildlife and Heritage Service of the Maryland Department of Natural Resources, devised in cooperation with the United States Fish and Wildlife Service. The intent of the plan is to implement widespread detection efforts using a variety of techniques. including electro-fishing equipment and electro trawls, in an effort to learn more about this rare species. The plan also recommends the protection of the Deer Creek watershed through the use of improved farming and forestry practices. In addition, strips of naturally vegetated lands are to be constructed adjacent to Deer Creek in an effort to insulate the watershed from harmful nearby agricultural runoff. The root systems and leaf cover established by these buffers would, in addition to preventing erosion, would help to absorb toxic chemicals and filter solid waste before it has a chance to enter the watershed. Additionally, surveys have been conducted by the Maryland Biological Stream Survey (MBSS) in 2001 through 2006. Six sites in Deer Creek were surveyed by MBSS as well as 22 additional sites in the greater Deer Creek watershed. One site in Gasheys Run, one site in the mainstem of Swan Creek, and four more sites within the greater Swan Creek Watershed were also sampled. Again, all of these surveys resulted in inconclusive evidence. Attempts to locate the Maryland darter remain largely unsuccessful.
