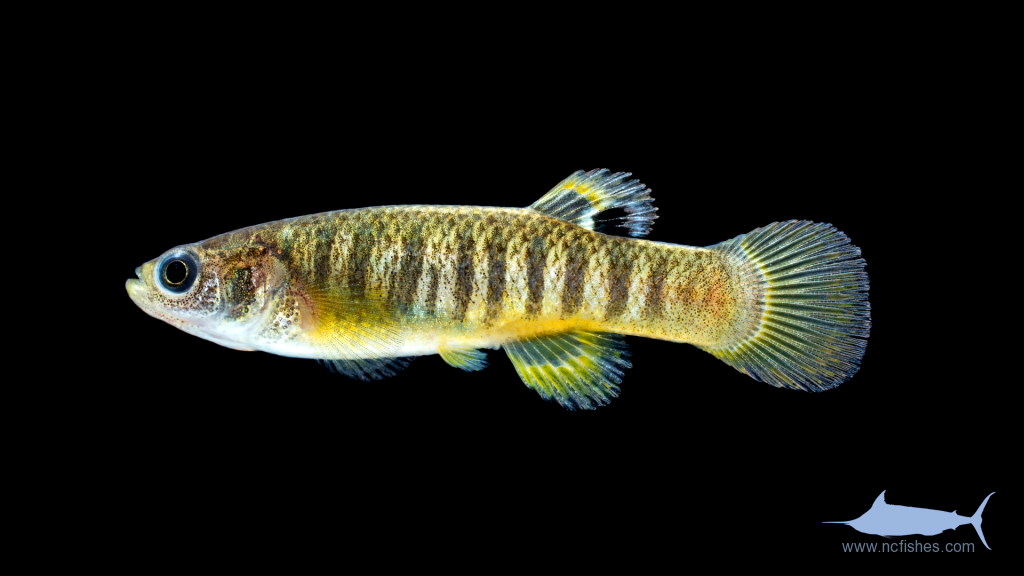

Conservation status
- Endangered (IUCN 3.1)

Scientific classification
- Kingdom: Animalia
- Phylum: Chordata
- Class: Actinopterygii
- Order: Cyprinodontiformes
- Family: Fundulidae
- Genus: Fundulus
- Species: F. luciae

Binomial name
- Fundulus luciae (S. F. Baird, 1855)

Synonyms
- Hydrargyra luciae (Baird 1855)

= Fundulus luciae =

Species of fish

Fundulus luciae, the spotfin killifish, is a member of the genus Fundulus. This hardy fish is notable for spending its entire life in sporadically flooded salt marsh habitat, sheltering in shallow pools, puddles, and small tidal rivulets. It closely resembles the mummichog (Fundulus heteroclitus) in shape and coloration, but the two species can be distinguished by dorsal fin ray count: 8–9 in the spotfin versus 11–12 in the mummichog. Additionally, the dorsal fin of F. luciae originates farther back, and slightly behind the anal fin origin; in the mummichog, the dorsal fin begins anteriorly to the anal fin origin. The spotfin killifish is named for the pronounced ocellus found on the posterior dorsal fin of adult males. It is a small fish, seldom attaining 50 millimetres (2.0 in) in total length. Its distribution extends along the U.S. east coast from Massachusetts to Georgia.

== Taxonomy ==
Fundulidae (Order: Cyprinodontiformes) is a family of topminnows, or killifishes, that are found in freshwater, marine, and brackish habitats in North America, Bermuda, and Yucatán. "Topminnow" was coined following observations of fishes using aquatic surface respiration (ASR), a behavior used to acquire more oxygen by hovering parallel to the surface near the air-water interface, during periods of hypoxia. The characteristic upturned mouth and flattened head of fundulids is believed to enhance ASR in low oxygen conditions. The scientific name Fundulus means exactly the opposite. Fundus is Latin for "bottom", and probably refers to the muddy substrate many common species inhabit and the propensity for fish to hide from predators in sediments. Killifish derives from the Dutch word "kill," meaning a stream or brook; it is a general name given to egg-laying toothcarps.

The genus Fundulus contains 38 extant species, found along U.S. coastal and inland regions, Bermuda, Cuba, and Yucatán. This species was described by Spencer Fullerton Baird as Hydrargyra luciae in 1855 with the type locality given as Robinson's Landing, Peck's Beach, opposite Beesley's Point, Cape May County. Baird gave it the specific name luciae in honor of his daughter, Lucy Hunter Baird (1848-1913).

== Description ==
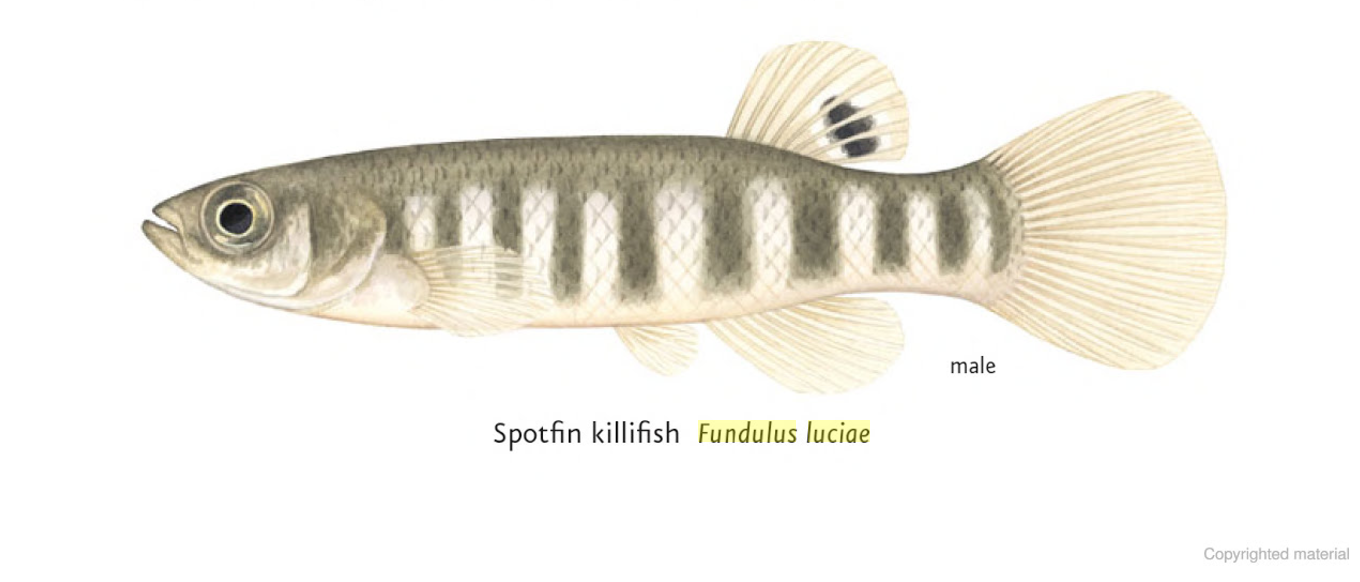
Fundulus luciae male, from Fishes of the Chesapeake Bay by Murdy, Birdsong, and Musick

The spotfin killifish is the smallest member of its genus, rarely exceeding 50 millimetres (2.0 in) total length or 40 millimetres (1.6 in) standard length. Larval fish transition to juvenile stage at around 10 mm standard length. Sexual maturity is attained at approximately 24–27 mm TL (males) and 28–30 mm TL (females). Body shape is elongated and less stocky than Fundulus heteroclitus, with an upturned mouth, flattened head and rounded caudal fin characteristic of the genus. Adults are sexually dimorphic, although both sexes are darker on top with a lighter belly. Juveniles and adult females are similar in appearance, with a body that is grayish-green to olive green in color, lacking a dorsal ocellus, and generally without vertical bars, although females may sometimes have sidebars (usually faint). Mature adult females may also have a visible sheath of tissue along the front of the anal fin, which is believed to function as an oviduct. Adult males have 10–14 dark vertical bars and the eponymous dorsal ocellus. During spawning season males develop dramatic coloration, consisting of vivid yellow-orange pigment extending over the belly, pelvic and anal fins, caudal peduncle, and caudal fin. Breeding males may also develop contact organs–small fleshy protuberances–on the head, sides of the body, and medial fins. Dorsal fin rays number 8–9 (usually 8) which is different from the mummichog, which has 11–12 dorsal fin rays. The anal fin has 10 rays. The spotfin killifish's dorsal fin originates posteriorly to the anal fin origin; this is another useful character that differs from other fundulids, including F. heteroclitus. While adults are distinct, larval fundulids can be tricky to ID to species. Longitudinal scale rows number 34–36. The gill opening is restricted superiorly.

== Distribution and habitat ==
The spotfin killifish inhabits the irregularly flooded zone of salt marshes, characterized largely by Spartina spp.(cordgrass) and Juncus roemarianus (needlerush), where it lives in puddles, shallow pools, small tidal rivulets, culms at the base of plants, and even crab burrows. It is a nonmigratory, permanent resident of the emergent marsh and stays even during low tides. Spotfin killifish prefer muddy substrate, probably because mud retains water at low tide more effectively than sand. This species is euryhaline but prefers medium to high salinities. In the wild, it has been captured from salinities ranging from 0–46 ppt. Due to difficulty in sampling the dense mud and thick plants characterizing F. luciae's preferred habitat, the species was once thought to be rare; however, more recent studies have shown that it can be locally abundant.

Spotfin killifish are distributed along the east coast of the United States, ranging from Massachusetts to Georgia.

=== Conservation status ===
The spotfin killifish is listed as a species of "least concern" (LC) by the IUCN Red List of Threatened Species.

== Diet ==
Spotfin killifish have a diet similar to the mummichog, consisting of detritus, diatoms, foraminiferans, rotifers, insects (dipterans–including mosquitoes and larval chironomids, homopterans, coleopterans, hymenopterans, lepidopterans, odonates, and hemipterans), collembolans, arachnids (spiders, pseudoscorpions, and acarina), crustaceans (copepods, tanaids, ostracods, cladocerans, isopods, and amphipods), annelid worms, mollusks (gastropods), and fish eggs.

== Physiology ==
=== Hardiness ===
Fundulids in general are known for high tolerance to extreme environmental fluctuation of parameters including temperature, salinity, and dissolved oxygen. In the wild, F. luciae have been collected in salinities ranging from 0–46 ppt, although medium to high salinities are preferred. In laboratory experiments, F. luciae tolerated salinities up to 106 ppt. Abrupt exposure to fresh water was fatal, but with gradual transition to fresh water ~40% of fish survived. Spotfin killifish have been found in temperatures ranging from 0.6–36.1 °C (33.1–97.0 °F).
