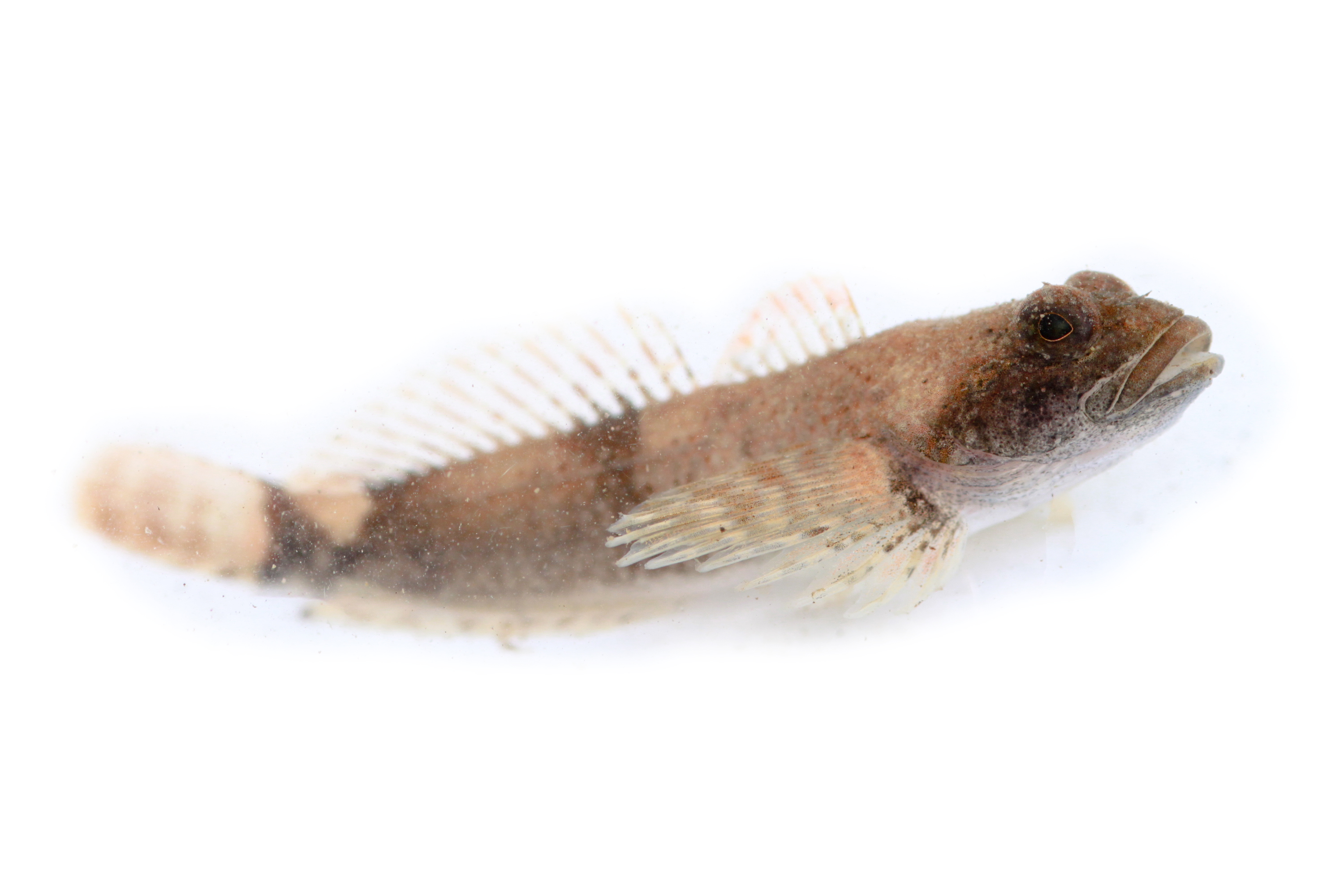

Conservation status
- Least Concern (IUCN 3.1)

- Apparently Secure (NatureServe)

Scientific classification
- Kingdom: Animalia
- Phylum: Chordata
- Class: Actinopterygii
- Order: Perciformes
- Suborder: Cottoidei
- Family: Cottidae
- Genus: Cottus
- Species: C. caeruleomentum

Binomial name
- Cottus caeruleomentum Kinziger, Raesly & Neely, 2000

= Blue Ridge sculpin =

Species of fish

The Blue Ridge sculpin (Cottus caeruleomentum) is a species of sculpin in the family Cottidae. It is native to the eastern United States, where it can be found in a number of river systems that drain into the Atlantic.

This fish is variable in morphology. It is up to about 6.3 centimetres (2.5 in) long. In general, the species has dark saddle marks and an incomplete lateral line. There are small spines on the preoperculum and small prickles in the postpectoral area. The breeding male, at least in some regions, has blue to blue-green coloration on the chin, the mouth, the bases of some of the fins, and the membrane connecting the bones around the gills. The fish is very similar to its close relative, Cottus bairdi, particularly the subspecies C. b. bairdi. The latter has notches in the band marking the base of the tail; C. caeruleomentum lacks the notches on one or both sides. C. bairdi lacks the blue breeding coloration; its chin is blackish. The two fish occur together and are known to hybridize.

This fish is native to the states of Delaware, Maryland, North Carolina, Pennsylvania, Virginia, and West Virginia. It can be found in the Elk, Susquehanna, Bush, Patapsco, Patuxent, Potomac, Nanticoke, James, and Roanoke river drainages. The species is common in upland habitat, and less common in lowlands. It lives in creeks, springs, and riffles. In coastal areas it is only found in cold streams.

The diet is made up of invertebrates.

The parasite load of this species has been investigated. The nematode Rhabdochona cotti lives in its intestine. Another nematode was found there and subsequently described as a new species named Freitascapillaria laticauda. It can be over a centimeter long.
