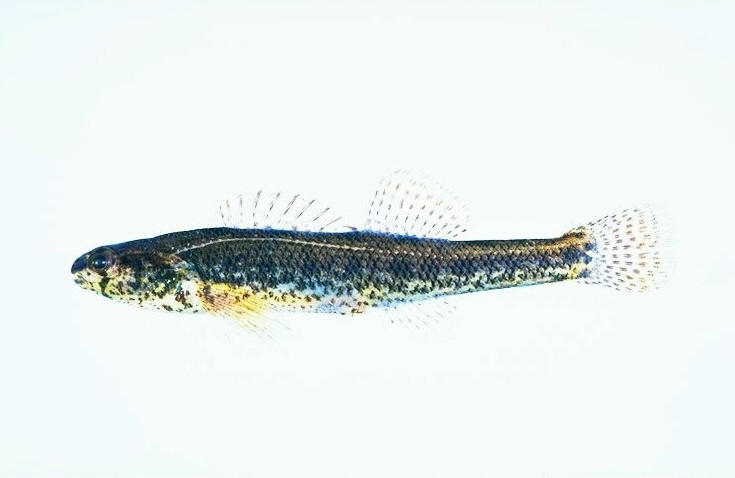

Conservation status
- Least Concern (IUCN 3.1)

Scientific classification
- Kingdom: Animalia
- Phylum: Chordata
- Class: Actinopterygii
- Order: Perciformes
- Family: Percidae
- Genus: Etheostoma
- Species: E. fusiforme

Binomial name
- Etheostoma fusiforme (Girard, 1854)

Synonyms
- Boleosoma fusiforme Girard, 1854; Etheostoma barratti (Holbrook, 1855); Boleosoma barratti Holbrook, 1855

= Swamp darter =

Species of fish

The swamp darter (Etheostoma fusiforme) is a species of freshwater ray-finned fish, a darter from the subfamily Etheostomatinae, part of the family Percidae, which also contains the perches, ruffes and pikeperches. It is endemic to the Eastern United States.

== Description ==
This species can reach a length of 5.9 cm (2.3 in), though most are only about 4 cm (1.6 in). It has a narrow, laterally compressed body with a rounded head and a blunt, conical snout which does not extend past the upper lips. The lateral line curves slightly upwards towards the tail. In color they are green to tan dorsally with small dark saddles and dark green and brown mottling. There are 10–12 square-shaped markings on the flanks. The underparts are white to yellow with numerous black and brown speckles. There is a narrow suborbital bar and 3 dusky black spots on the caudal fin. The rays in the fins are marked with small spots and the spiny part of the male's dorsal fin normally has a dark band at its base and another dark submarginal band. When breeding, the males become darker and tubercles develop on the soft rays of the pelvic and anal fins, the spine in the pelvic fin and frequently grow on the second spine of the anal fin.

== Distribution ==
The swamp darter has a wide distribution in the lowlands of the eastern United States, it is generally found below the fall line on the Atlantic and Gulf coastal plains from southern Maine to the Sabine River, Louisiana and the Red River of the South in southeastern Oklahoma. It is also found in the tributaries of the Mississippi River as far north as Kentucky and southeastern Missouri. An introduced swamp darter population is established in the French Broad River system in North Carolina. In New York State the swamp darter only occurs in the Peconic River and in a small number of ponds in the vicinity of that river in eastern Long Island, the swamp darter also extends up the Red River of the South drainage as far as North Texas and Southeastern Oklahoma, where it is rare. No other darter is found as far south as E. fusiforme.

== Habitat and biology ==
The swamp darter is found in slow moving and still waters, like ditches and oxbow lakes, which are typical of low-lying coastal plains. It seems to show a preference for clearer water areas where there is more vegetation than the sympatric slough darter (Etheostoma gracile). They can be found in flowing water but prefer still water including backwaters and ponds, including beaver dams. They are normally found in dark acidic waters but can thrive in clearwater if sufficient cover is available.

Swamp darters feed on fly larvae, amphipods, and other small crustaceans and insects. Swamp darters tend to be an important element in the diets of young chain pickerel and young largemouth bass, where the species coexist.

Spawning is thought to occur in May in New Jersey; elsewhere, breeding individuals have been collected in March, April, and May. Swamp darters are not bashful about spawning. They typically spawn in the same habitats where they are found. The male approaches a female from the rear, mounts her, and beats her with his pelvic fins. The female then leads the male into aquatic plants, where the eggs are deposited singly on leaves. No parental care of the eggs has been observed, and no information regarding the number of males with which females spawn and vice versa. No fighting or display of territoriality is typically observed. For many populations of the swamp darter, maximum longevity is only one year, with very few individuals surviving two years.

== Conservation ==
The swamp darter has suffered local declines and extinctions due to alteration of its habitats by humans, urbanisation and agricultural works such as canalization, drainage, pollution and siltation have reduced the available habitat. It is localized and uncommon on the margins of its range, for example it is classified as endangered in Missouri. Overall its wide range, large population size, large number of populations and overall stability of numbers has led the IUCN to classify the swamp darter as Least Concern.

== Taxonomy and etymology ==
The swamp darter was first formally described in 1854 as Boleosoma fusiforme by the French biologist Charles Frédéric Girard (1822–1895) with the type locality given as a tributary of Charles River at Framingham, Massachusetts. It has been placed in the subgenus Hololepsis or in the larger Boleichthys. There are two recognised subspecies, although many have been proposed in the past:

- E.f. barretti: from the Pee Dee River in South Carolina and including the southern and western parts of its range
- E.f. fusiforme: the northern Atlantic coastal range from the Waccamaw River, North Carolina as far as Maine

The specific name means "spindle shaped" or tapering at each end.
