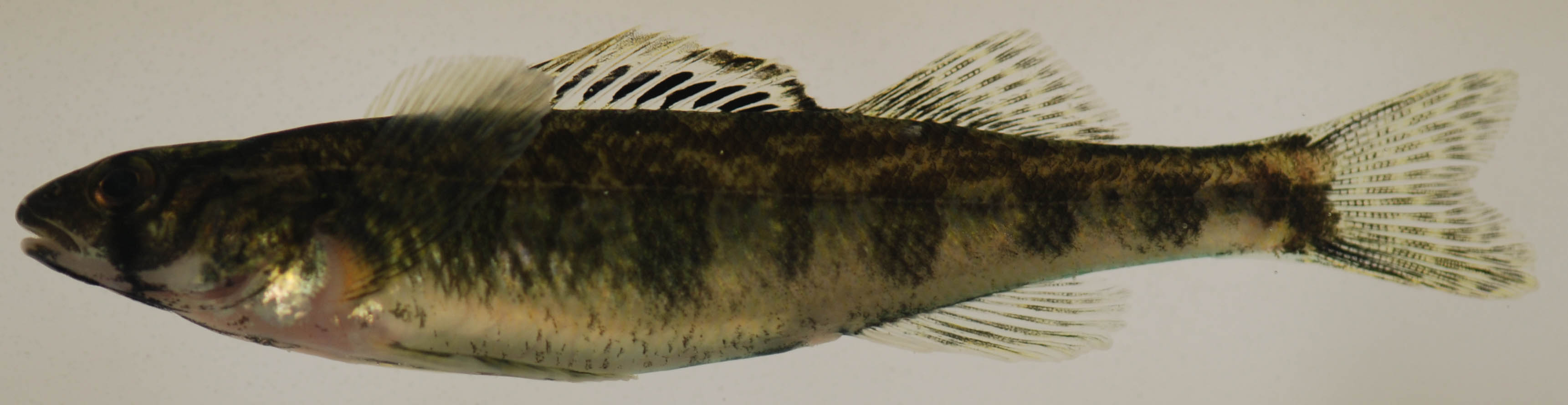

Conservation status
- Least Concern (IUCN 3.1)

Scientific classification
- Kingdom: Animalia
- Phylum: Chordata
- Class: Actinopterygii
- Division: Teleostei
- Order: Perciformes
- Family: Percidae
- Genus: Percina
- Species: P. peltata

Binomial name
- Percina peltata (Stauffer, 1864)

Synonyms
- Etheostoma peltatum Stauffer, 1864

= Percina peltata =

Species of fish

Percina peltata, the shield darter, is a species of freshwater ray-finned fish, a darter from the subfamily Etheostomatinae, part of the family Percidae, which also contains the perches, ruffes and pikeperches. It is endemic to the eastern United States.

== Description ==
Percina peltata attains a maximum total length of 9 centimetres (3.5 in), although around 6.4 centimetres (2.5 in) is a more common length. It has a body which is olive to tan in colour on the back marked with 6–7 horizontally rectangular black blotches on the flanks, These are normally connected by a thin black stripe. These blotches are connected to the 8–11 dark saddle marks by sinuous brown lines. On the caudal fin there is a black spot below the centre of its base and there is a large black teardrop shaped marking on the head. At the base of the first dorsal fin there is a row of black crescent shaped markings.

== Distribution ==
Percina peltata Is endemic to the eastern United States where it is found in the drainages of the Atlantic Slope from the Hudson and Susquehanna rivers in New York, to the James River In Virginia. A non native population has become established in the Rondout Creek and Hudson River drainage basins in New York via the Delaware and Hudson Canal.

== Habitat and biology ==
Percina peltata is found in moderate-sized creeks where there is a gravel and rubble bottom and a strong current. The shield darter feeds on small aquatic invertebrates and terrestrial invertebrates→ which fall into the water.

This species spawns over fine gravel with some large rocks. It normally occurs during the day but has been observed at night. It starts in mid-April and continues into May. The males set up territories on the fine gravel which has been deposited on the downstream sides os larger rocks. The males defend this territory chasing other males for up to 3.3 metres (11 ft), although defence was concentrated in the immediate 60 centimetres (2.0 ft). The eggs are laid and buried in the gravel and mating lasts 10–15 seconds.

== Taxonomy ==
Percina peltata was first formally described in 1864 as Etheostoma peltatum by the Pennsylvania born naturalist Jacob Stauffer (1808–1880) with the type locality given as the Conestoga River near Lancaster, Pennsylvania.
