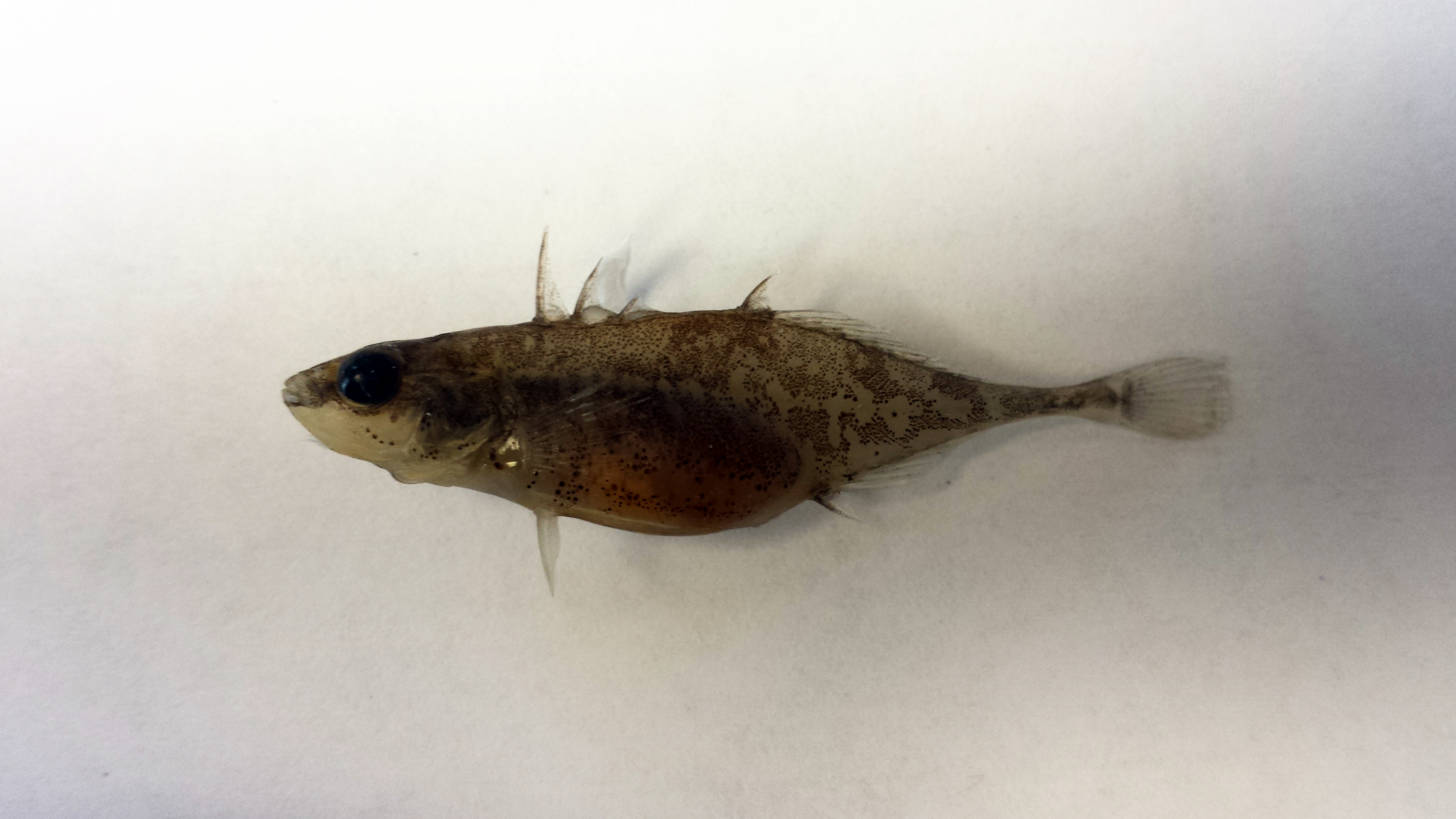
- Gravid female A. quadracus

Conservation status
- Least Concern (IUCN 3.1)

Scientific classification
- Kingdom: Animalia
- Phylum: Chordata
- Class: Actinopterygii
- Order: Perciformes
- Family: Gasterosteidae
- Genus: Apeltes; DeKay, 1842
- Species: A. quadracus

Binomial name
- Apeltes quadracus (Mitchill, 1815)

Synonyms
- Gasterosteus quadracus Mitchill, 1815

= Apeltes =

Genus of fishes

Apeltes is a monospecific genus old ray-finned fish belonging to the family Gasterosteidae, the sticklebacks. The only species in the genus is A. quadracus, the fourspine stickleback or bloody stickleback, which lives in freshwater, brackish and benthopelagic environments of the northwestern Atlantic Ocean between Newfoundland and South Carolina.

== Appearance ==
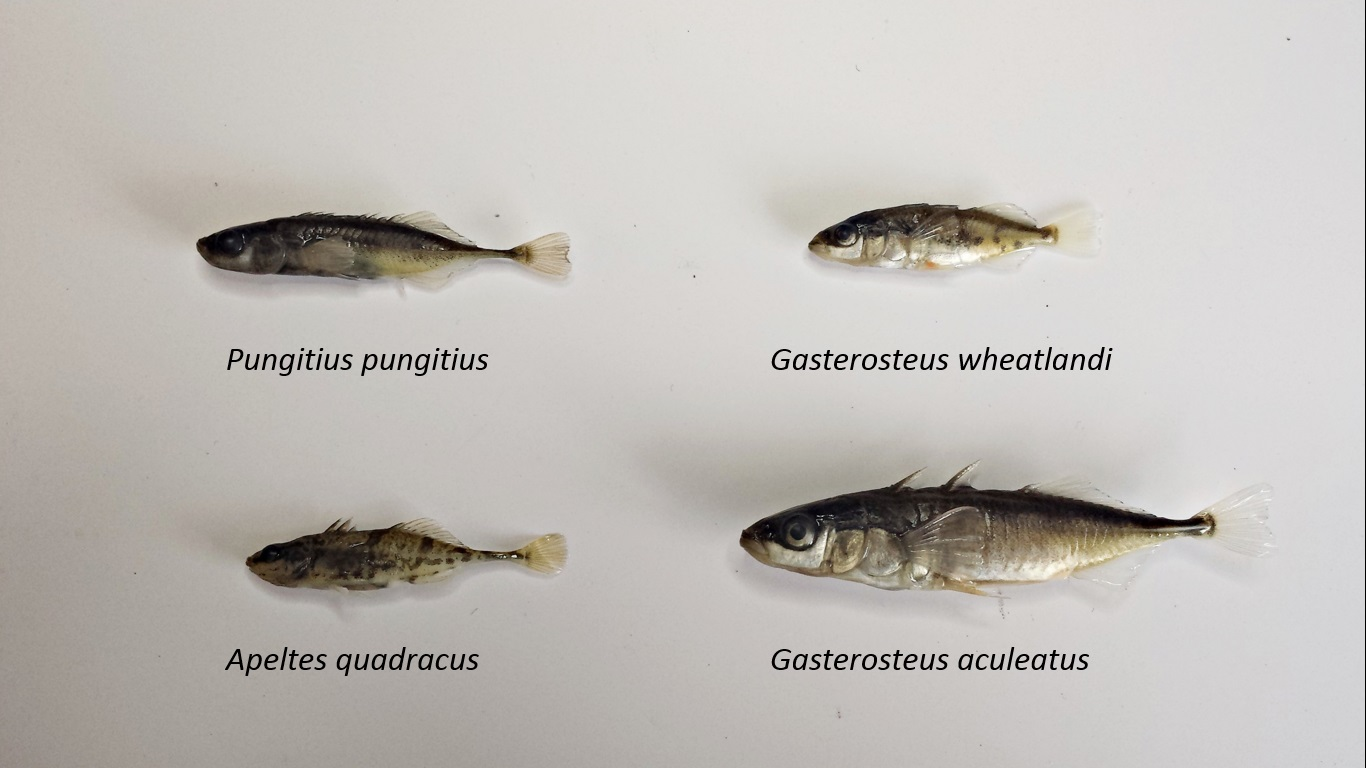
Fourspine stickleback size comparison to three other species of Gasterosteidae.

The fourspine stickleback is the smallest member of Gasterosteidae. It typically has either four or five dorsal spines, but may have as many as seven. It has an elongated fusiform body that is spotted brown to olive green except for the underside. Its belly is silvery white. Males tend to be darker than females and develop red pelvic spines. The first three dorsal spines are close together and stick out at acute angles, each with a triangular membrane. The fourth spine is straight and associated with the dorsal fin. Its lateral line ends blow the origin of the second dorsal fin. Its pelvic fins sit almost right below the pectoral fins in the thoracic region. The species does not have scales. They usually grow to be about 4 centimeters, but can reach 5 to 6 centimeters in length.

== Distribution ==
The species is found from Newfoundland and Quebec southward to North Carolina, living close to freshwater shores in well-vegetated areas. It has been introduced to a few freshwater bodies in Pennsylvania, Alabama, New Jersey, and in Lake Superior.

== Ecology ==
Fourspine sticklebacks are largely solitary, spending most of their time near the bottom of lakes. Their diet consists of microscopic invertebrates and plankton. Fourspine stickleback typically breed at one year of age, though some individuals may survive to breed again at age two. Their breeding season lasts from April until late July, often breeding at the same time and location as three other stickleback species (threespine, ninespine, and blackspotted stickleback). Males establish territories and construct nests of vegetation either on the bottom or on underwater structures, and may construct as many as five stacked nests. Once he has attracted a female and fertilized her eggs, the male watches over the nest until the eggs hatch. Females may produce several clutches of eggs per year.
