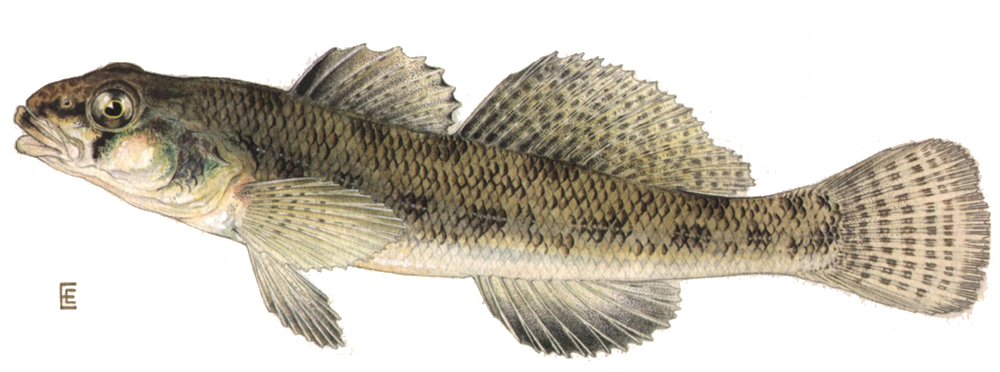

Conservation status
- Least Concern (IUCN 3.1)

- Secure (NatureServe)

Scientific classification
- Kingdom: Animalia
- Phylum: Chordata
- Class: Actinopterygii
- Division: Teleostei
- Order: Perciformes
- Family: Percidae
- Genus: Etheostoma
- Species: E. olmstedi

Binomial name
- Etheostoma olmstedi D. H. Storer, 1842

= Tessellated darter =

Species of fish

The tessellated darter (Etheostoma olmstedi) is a species of freshwater ray-finned fish, a darter from the subfamily Etheostomatinae, part of the family Percidae, which also contains the perches, ruffes and pikeperches. It is native to Canada and the United States. It was formerly considered a subspecies of the johnny darter, which it greatly resembles in general appearance.

== Description ==
Adults are usually 2 to 3 inches long, occasionally reaching 4 inches. Both the tessellated darter and johnny darter are rather pale with small, X- or W-shaped markings on the back and upper sides. Both have only a single anal fin spine whereas all other darters in their range have two. Tessellated darters have somewhat sharper snouts than johnny darters, more dorsal soft rays, and more pectoral fin rays. The suborbital sensory canal is complete in most tessellated darters, usually broken into two sections in johnny darters. Their nape is usually naked, and their cheeks are partly too completely scaled. The breast is usually naked and the belly partly scaled. The body of the tessellated darter is elongate, but a little compressed. In breeding males, the spines have fleshy knobs although they are not as well developed as in the fantail darter. They are a pale, sandy color shading to whitish along the body ventrally. Some scales of the upper sides have dark margins forming wavy bars of varying lengths and different angles. Their sides have X- and W-shaped marks, of which 9 to 11 are prominent along the midside. Dorsal fins have a dark pigment spot on the first interradial membrane, and the rest of the fin is clear or slightly dusky. the snout has a dark line from each eye to the nostrils. Juveniles and breeding adults develop 12 or 13 rather even vertical bands along their sides while losing the wavy lines and X-shaped markings as the scales of the upper sides become quite dark with pale tips on the pectoral and pelvic fins. The unpigmented areas of the second dorsal, anal, and caudal fins stand out so that the fin has the appearance of having white bands on a dark background, which is a reversal of the appearance in non-breeding adults. In this color phase, they are sometimes mistaken for a species of Percina.

== Ecology ==
Tessellated darters eat crustaceans and small insects when they are small, gradually shifting to larger insects as the fish get bigger. Male tessellated darters guard nests of fertilized eggs until the fry (young) are free-swimming, and have been observed to engage in alloparental (adoptive) care of previous nest inhabitants' eggs. Alloparental care is associated with increased male reproductive success in this species. Males frequently engage in filial cannibalism (consumption of their own offspring).

== Taxonomy and etymology ==
The tessellated darter was first formally described in 1842 by the American ichthyologist David Humphreys Storer with the type locality given as the Connecticut River at Hartford, Connecticut. The specific name honors the collector of the type, Charles H. Olmsted who was president of the Hartford Natural History Society. It is closely related to the Johnny darter E. nigrum and has been considered synonymous with it.
