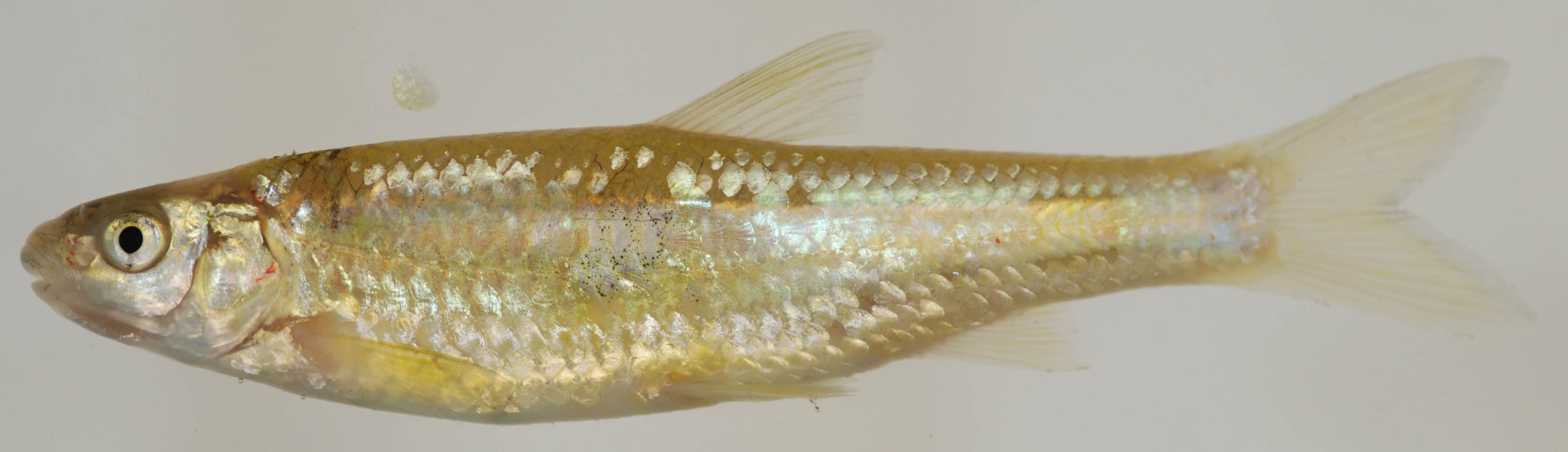
- Hybognathus regius

Conservation status
- Least Concern (IUCN 3.1)

- Secure (NatureServe)

Scientific classification
- Kingdom: Animalia
- Phylum: Chordata
- Class: Actinopterygii
- Order: Cypriniformes
- Family: Leuciscidae
- Subfamily: Pogonichthyinae
- Genus: Hybognathus
- Species: H. regius

Binomial name
- Hybognathus regius Girard, 1856
- Range map of Eastern silvery minnow (Hybognathus regius)

Synonyms
- Hybognathus osmerinus Cope, 1870

= Eastern silvery minnow =

Species of fish

The eastern silvery minnow (Hybognathus regius) is a species of freshwater ray-finned fish belonging to the family Leuciscidae, the shiners, daces and minnows. They are characterized by their lack of barbels. In appearance, they are similar to shiners, but the lower jaw is crescent-shaped rather than U-shaped and there is a secondary loop in the gut, which is sometimes visible through the body wall of preserved specimen.

The eastern silvery minnow has more angulate fins than the other members of the genus Hybognathus. The dorsal margin is more concave. Its scales have a radius of 10–12 mm. It has circuli with sharp angles at the basal corners of the scale. Its head is pointed. They grow to be about 6 inches in length at maximum.
