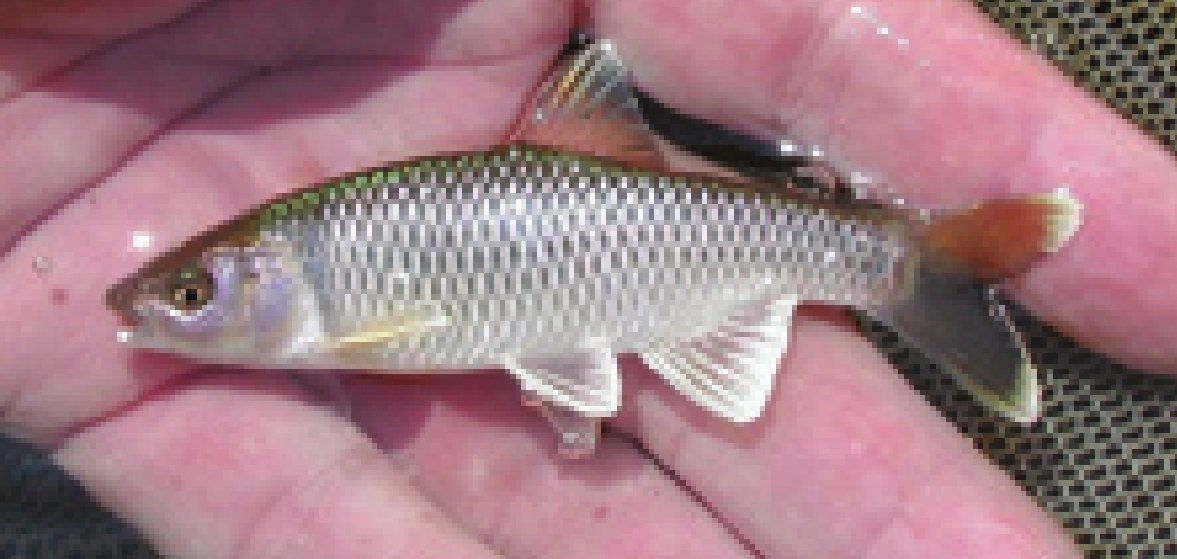

Conservation status
- Least Concern (IUCN 3.1)

Scientific classification
- Kingdom: Animalia
- Phylum: Chordata
- Class: Actinopterygii
- Order: Cypriniformes
- Family: Leuciscidae
- Genus: Cyprinella
- Species: C. analostana

Binomial name
- Cyprinella analostana Girard, 1859

Synonyms
- Notropis analostanus (Girard, 1859)

= Satinfin shiner =

Species of fish

The satinfin shiner (Cyprinella analostana) is a species of freshwater ray-finned fish in the family Leuciscidae, the shiners, daces and minnows. It is native to the eastern United States, where its distribution extends from New York to South Carolina. It is a common fish and not considered threatened. This fish is about 7 to 9 centimeters long, with a maximum length of 11 centimeters.

It is a freshwater fish that inhabits rivers and creeks, sometimes entering pools and riffles, and found from headwaters to areas near tidal influence. It eats insects, especially flies and mayflies. Spawning occurs in spring and summer, with individuals spawning several times over a season. The eggs are laid in cracks and crevices, under rocks, and on tree roots and wood debris. The male guards them until the young emerge in about one to two weeks, depending on temperature. The lifespan of the species is 3 to 4 years.

This species produces vocalizations that aid in species and sex recognition.

The specific epithet is derived from a name for Theodore Roosevelt Island (Analostan Island), as the type specimens were collected from Rock Creek, which enters the Potomac River opposite the river island.
