= Stripeback darter =

Conservation status
- Least Concern (IUCN 3.1)

Scientific classification
- Kingdom: Animalia
- Phylum: Chordata
- Class: Actinopterygii
- Order: Perciformes
- Family: Percidae
- Genus: Percina
- Species: P. notogramma

Binomial name
- Percina notogramma Raney & C. L. Hubbs, 1948

Synonyms
- Hadropterus notogrammus Raney & Hubbs, 1948; Hadropterus maculatus Girard, 1859

Species of fish

The stripeback darter (Percina notogramma) is a species of freshwater ray-finned fish, a darter from the subfamily Etheostomatinae, part of the family Percidae, which also contains the perches, ruffes and pikeperches. It is found in Chesapeake Bay tributaries in Maryland, Virginia, and West Virginia. It prefers gravel runs and riffles of small to medium-sized rivers.
