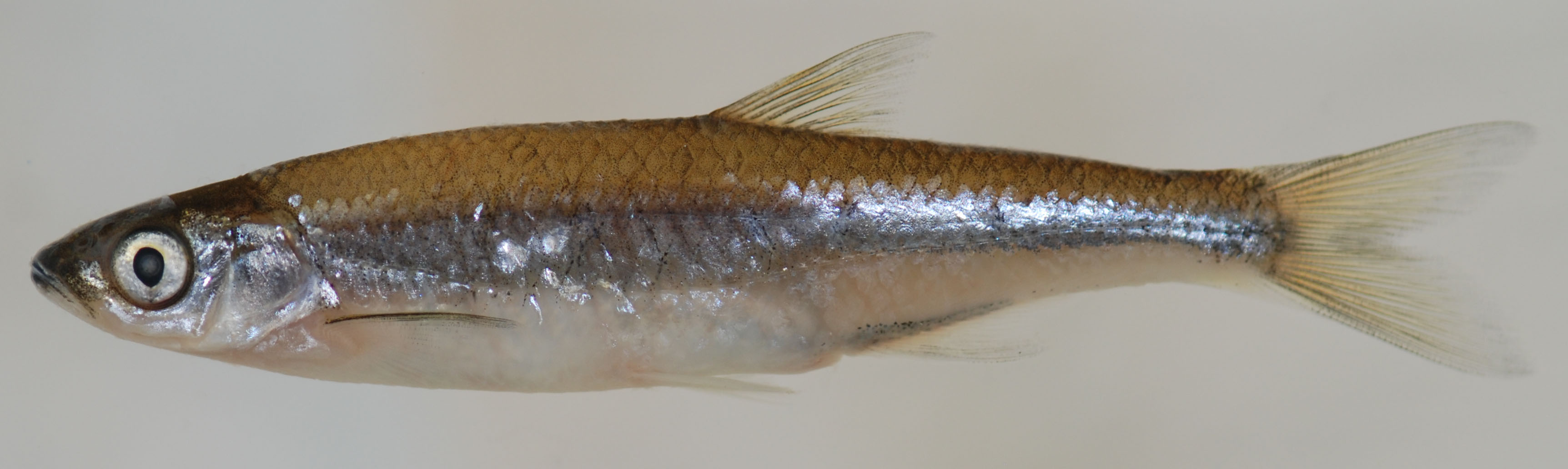

Conservation status
- Least Concern (IUCN 3.1)

Scientific classification
- Kingdom: Animalia
- Phylum: Chordata
- Class: Actinopterygii
- Division: Teleostei
- Order: Cypriniformes
- Family: Leuciscidae
- Subfamily: Pogonichthyinae
- Genus: Notropis
- Species: N. amoenus

Binomial name
- Notropis amoenus (C. C. Abbott, 1874)

Synonyms
- Alburnellus amoenus Abbott, 1874

= Comely shiner =

Species of fish

The Comely shiner (Notropis amoenus) is a small species of North American ray-finned fish belonging to the family Cyprinidae. It was described by Charles Conrad Abbott in 1874.

== Description ==
The comely shiner is a thin, silvery minnow. It can be identified by its dorsal and ventral fins of equal curvature, slender and compressed body, and posterior-sided stripe. The scales are crowded from its anterior fin to the pelvic fin. It is pale in color, but a darker olive green on its top. They can grow up to 8.8 cm in length.

== Distribution and habitat ==
The comely shiner lives from the southern Hudson River to the Cape Fear River system in North Carolina. They breed in the spring and summer seasons. The comely shiner prefers streams and other bodies of water 2 or more feet deep. It tends to live in pools and backwaters of swift streams.
