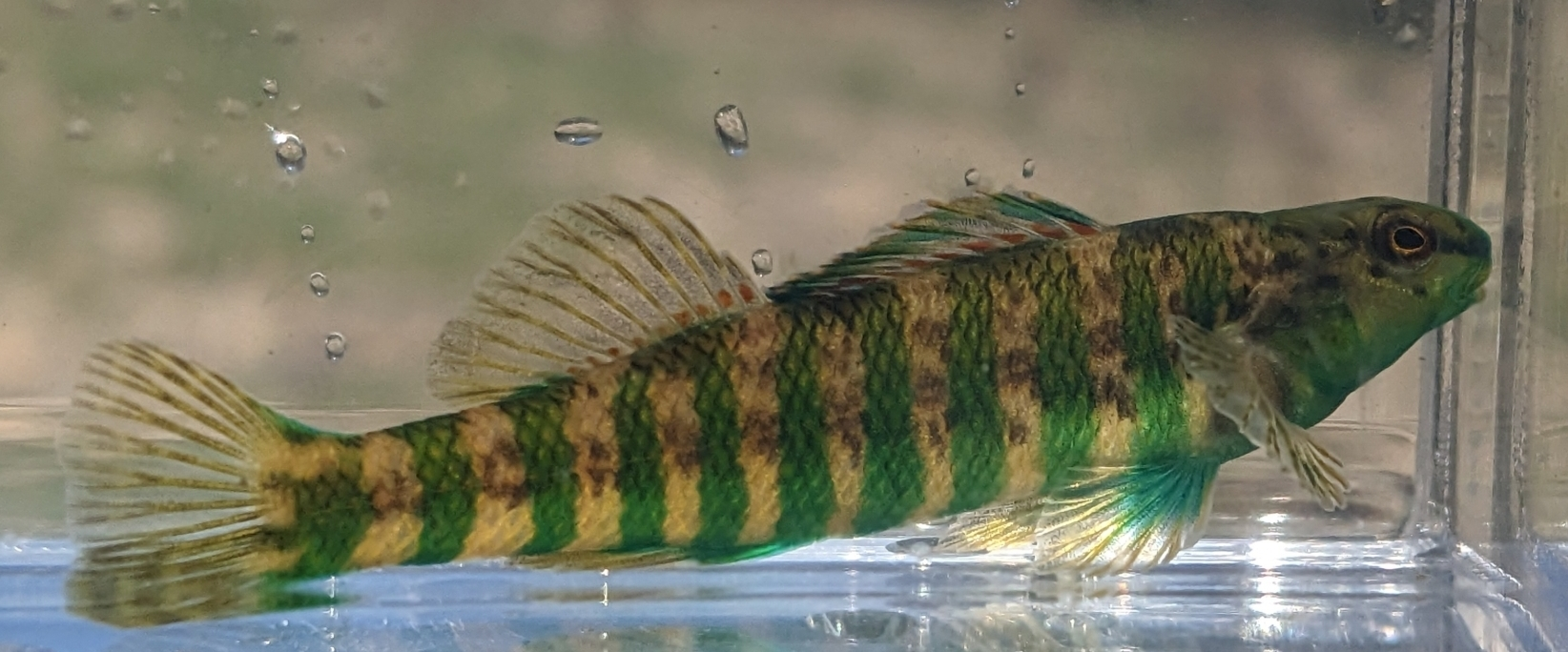
- In Ohio

Conservation status
- Least Concern (IUCN 3.1)

- Secure (NatureServe)

Scientific classification
- Kingdom: Animalia
- Phylum: Chordata
- Class: Actinopterygii
- Order: Perciformes
- Family: Percidae
- Genus: Etheostoma
- Species: E. zonale

Binomial name
- Etheostoma zonale (Cope, 1868)

Synonyms
- Poecilichthys zonalis Cope, 1868

= Etheostoma zonale =

Banded darter

Species of fish

Etheostoma zonale, the banded darter, is a species of freshwater ray-finned fish, a darter from the subfamily Etheostomatinae, part of the family Percidae, which also contains the perches, ruffes and pikeperches. It is endemic to the eastern United States.

It is mainly found in the Mississippi Basin, ranging from the Verdigris River in Kansas eastward to the Allegheny River in New York, and from the Minnesota River in Minnesota southward to the Ouachita River in Arkansas and the Tennessee River in Alabama. Its typical habitat in small and medium-sized rivers is riffles over cobble or gravel, rock slabs, and small boulders. It feeds on the riverbed on small insect larvae and is itself eaten by birds and larger fish. Males become more colorful and become territorial before spawning which takes place in spring. The females attach the eggs to waterweed. The population trend of this fish seems to be stable, it is a common species with numerous sub-populations over a wide range, no major threats have been identified and the International Union for Conservation of Nature has assessed its conservation status as being of "least concern".

== Description ==
E. zonale can reach a length of 7.8 centimetres (3.1 in) TL though most only reach about 5.3 centimetres (2.1 in).

== Distribution ==
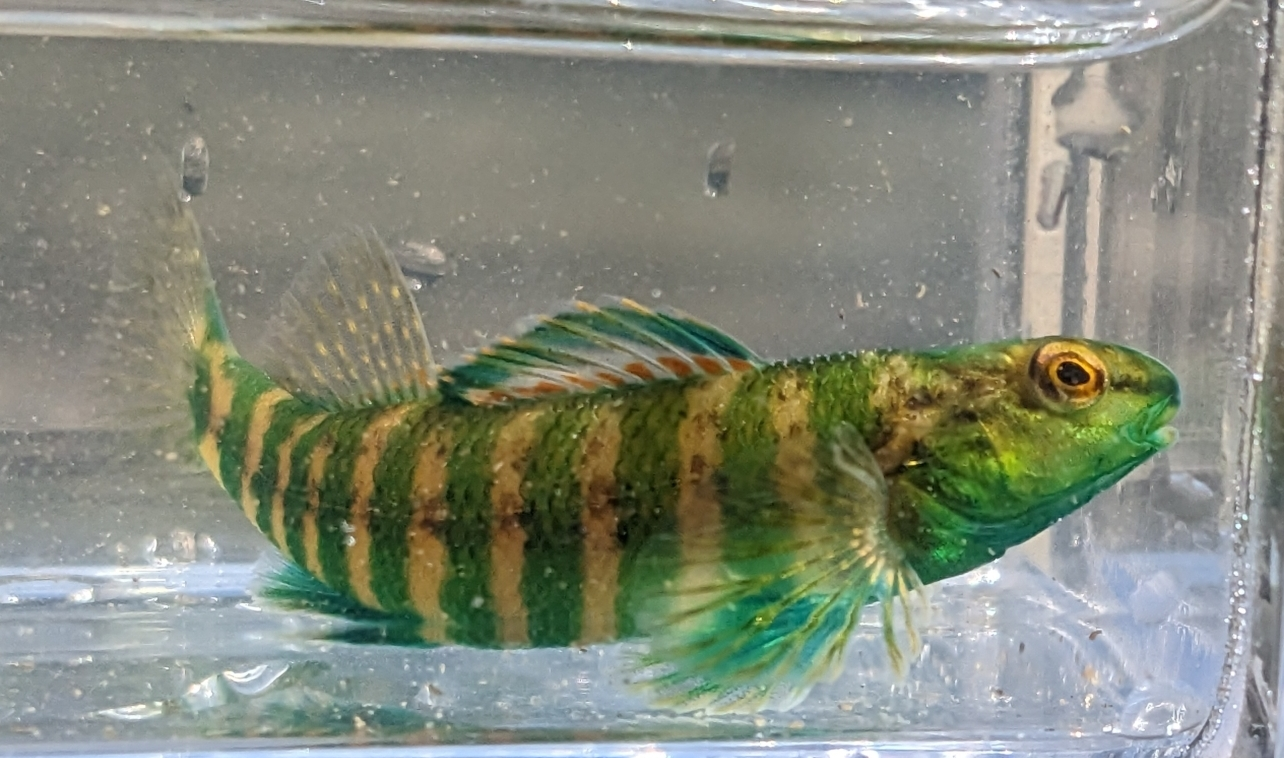
In Ohio

The banded darter is one of the most common darters in North America, where an estimated 250 species of darters occur.

The banded darter has a widespread distribution throughout much of eastern United States, primarily the Mississippi Basin. It ranges from the Verdigris River in Kansas eastward to the Allegheny River in New York and from the Minnesota River in Minnesota southward to the Ouachita River in Arkansas and the Tennessee River in Alabama. The banded darter can also be found in the headwaters of the Savannah River, in drainages of Lake Michigan, in the Duck River, and other streams across eastern United States.

=== Non-native range ===
The species has been introduced in a few non-native streams. Its most distinguishable introduction has occurred in the Susquehanna River drainage. Specimens of the banded darter and the native darter, Etheostoma olmstedi (tessellated darter), were collected at Catatonk Creek in New York beginning in the 1960s. Biologists have studied the two darters and their niches in the Susquehanna River drainage. They found the banded darter was outcompeting the tessellated darter for habitat and resources. The buccal cavity length of the tessellated darter has increased since the banded darter was introduced to the watershed, which is expected to result in higher suction feeding performance measured as volumetric flow rate of water through the mouth. The morphological change in the tessellated darter was likely caused from the banded darter taking over the niche of the tessellated darter.

== Ecology ==
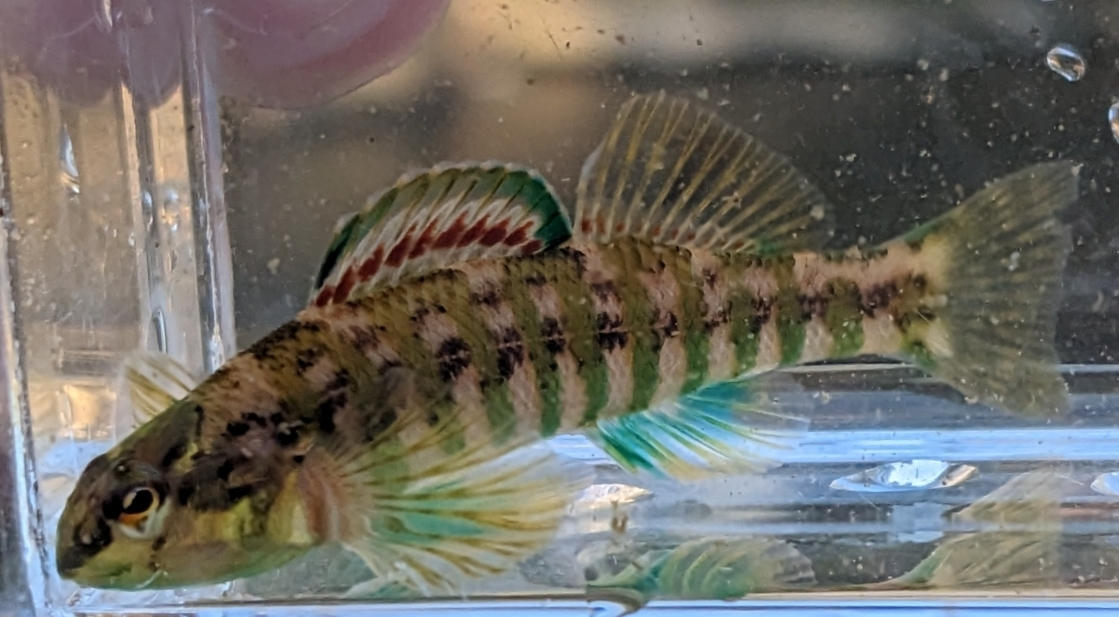
In Tennessee

=== Habitat ===
The banded darter prefers to live around swift riffles of moderately large to large cobble or gravel, rock slabs, and small boulders in moderate-sized streams and rivers. The banded darter prefers water deeper than 25 cm in the riffles around the midchannel of the river or creek. The banded darter tolerates a diverse range of temperatures; it can survive in water between 32 and 80 °F, but its preferred temperature range is between 72 and 76 °F.

=== Diet ===
The diet of the banded darter consists of midge, mayfly larva, black flies and trichopteran larvae. Ten specimens of the banded darter were captured and monitored in a tank. Chironomids (larvae of non-biting flies called midges), ephemeropterans (mayflies), and trichopterans (caddisflies) were supplied for the darters to eat. The study found the banded darter prefers chironomids over the mayflies (ephemeropterans) or caddisflies (trichopterans), and the fish fed more during the day than they did at night.

=== Species interactions ===
As a small fish, banded darters have numerous predators including larger fish such as smallmouth bass and largemouth bass, as well as fish-eating birds like herons and egrets. This darter will compete with other darters for habitat. For example, in the Susquehanna River drainage, the tessellated darter competes with the banded darter. Humans may affect their distribution. For example, dams slow the flow of a river or a creek and could cause loss of habitat. By contrast, climate change / global warming could increase the range of distribution of the banded darter by resulting in warmer water closer to their preferred temperature.

== Lifecycle ==
The first banded darter was described by Cope in 1868 in the North Fork of the Holston River in Virginia. Spawning season occurs during late spring in April and May, but the breeding color for the males begins to intensify during February. A banded darter can spawn at one year of age. The breeding color helps attract females to the males. The female banded darter will attach adhesive eggs to algae. While spawning, males are territorial and would chase other banded darters. Most pairs of banded darters would court and spawn in a 1-m^{2} area. While breeding, the male darters would stimulate the nape and head regions of the females by using their heads or fins. Once the female began undulating, the male quickly mounted her with his head, and they both quivered in unison while moving 2–3 cm forward. The process took usually no more than 1 sec. Fertilization of the eggs is external. After the female spawns, the male will swim away. For eight breeding pairs of darters, the least amount of time it took a pair to mate was four minutes, while the longest spawning time took 54 min.

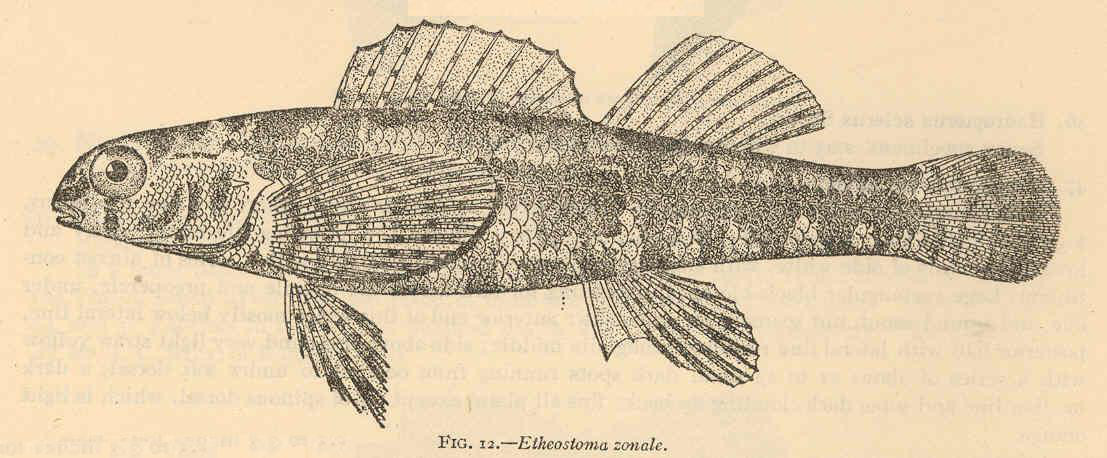
1916 illustration

In the Duck River in Tennessee and three separate populations of darters in Arkansas, interannual variation in the banded darter's clutch size appears to be less extensive than geographic variation, but egg size is less variable than clutch size due to geographical and temporal locations. Clutch size will vary from 10 to around 100 eggs.

== Management ==
Not much information is available on management and conservation of the banded darter. Since the banded darter is one of North America's most common darters, the species is not listed on the federal endangered list. Mainly, the only agencies working on conservation for the darter are state agencies. The banded darter is protected in the Great Smoky Mountains National Park in Tennessee and North Carolina. Some ideas for management of the banded darter are to stop building dams and stop pollution of streams they inhabit. The banded darter is sensitive to siltation and pollution, and dams are thought to limit its distribution. The banded darter will also be affected by run-off from surrounding lands of the river or stream they inhabit. Michigan state agencies are managing the darter by monitoring habitat and water chemistry. If a dam is built in a river the banded darter inhabits, the dam would be destruction to the habitat.
