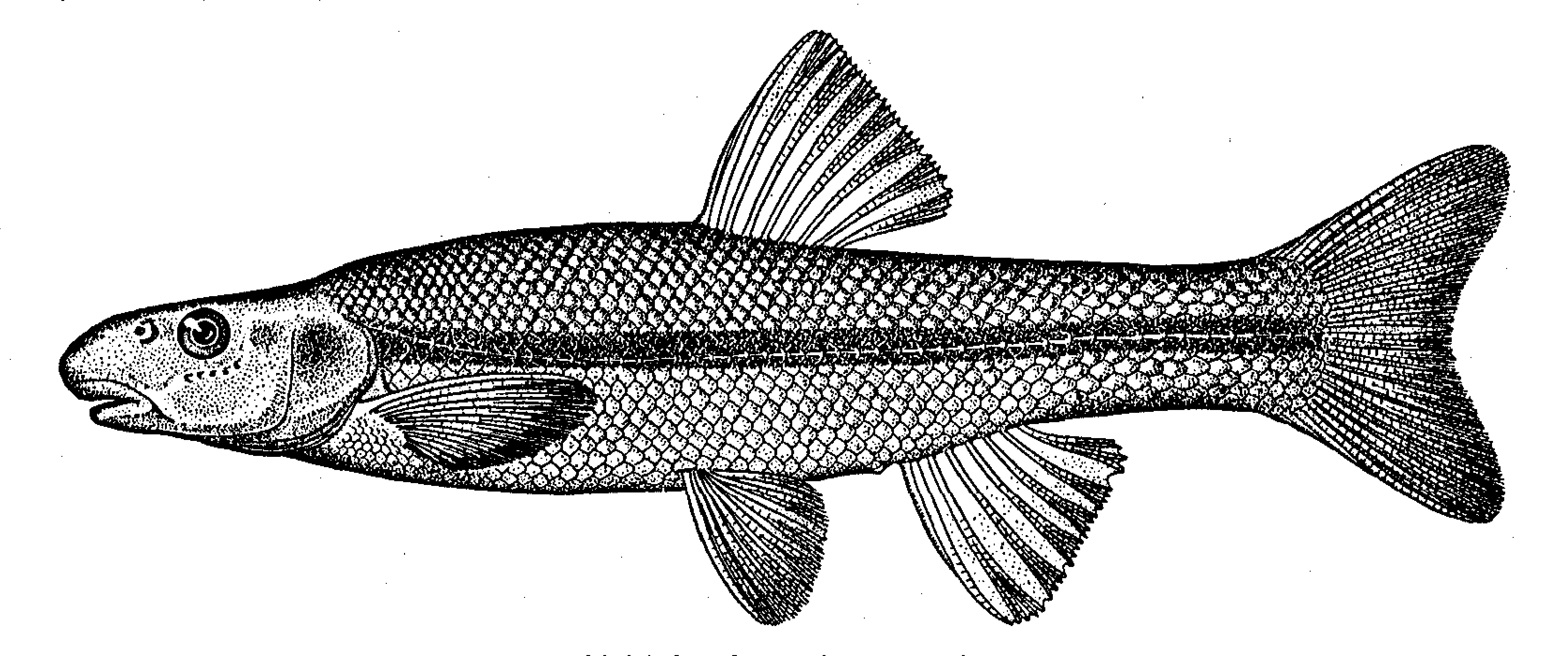

Scientific classification
- Kingdom: Animalia
- Phylum: Chordata
- Class: Actinopterygii
- Order: Cypriniformes
- Family: Leuciscidae
- Subfamily: Pogonichthyinae
- Hybrid: Nocomis micropogon × Rhinichthys cataractae

Synonyms
- Rhinichthys bowersi Goldsborough & Clark, 1908; Pararhinichthys bowsersi (Goldsborough & Clark, 1908)

= Cheat minnow =

Species of fish

The cheat minnow is a hybrid demersal, freshwater fish endemic to the United States, most commonly found in the Ohio River basin. Originally considered the only species in the genus Pararhinichthys as Pararhinichthys bowersi, more recent studies suggest that it is an F1 hybrid of Rhinichthys cataractae and Nocomis micropogon. It is no longer recognized as a distinct taxon by Eschmeyer's Catalog of Fishes.
