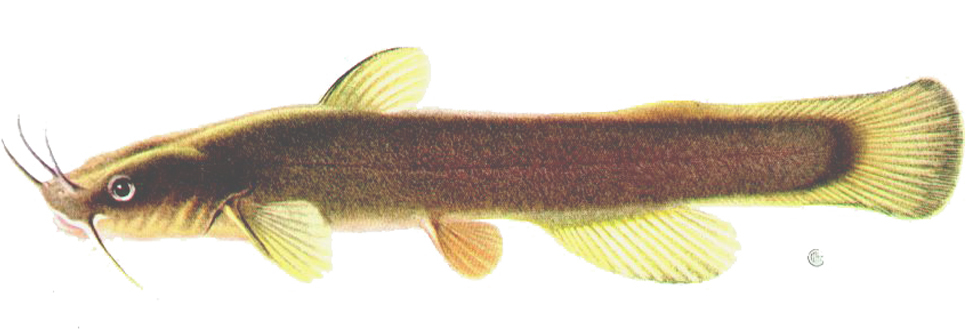

Conservation status
- Least Concern (IUCN 3.1)

Scientific classification
- Kingdom: Animalia
- Phylum: Chordata
- Class: Actinopterygii
- Order: Siluriformes
- Family: Ictaluridae
- Genus: Noturus
- Species: N. insignis

Binomial name
- Noturus insignis (J. Richardson, 1836)

Synonyms
- Pimelodus insigne Richardson, 1836

= Noturus insignis =

Margined madtom

Species of fish

Noturus insignis (margined madtom) is a small species of North American catfish belonging to the family Ictaluridae.

== Description ==
The margined madtom is yellow to dark gray on the upper side of the body, and a pale shade on the underside. It is slimmer than other members of the family Ictaluridae. It has a square tail and lacks the rays of other tadpole madtoms. The dorsal fin and anal fins are rounded, the chin barbels are pale, and all the other barbels are dark. They are sized from about 10 cm to 13 cm.

== Distribution and habitat ==
The species ranges from Lake Ontario drainages southward to Georgia. Margined madtoms inhabit clear-water streams, taking shelter among rocks, gravel, and boulders. Its eggs are laid in large quantities, and are guarded by the male parent.
