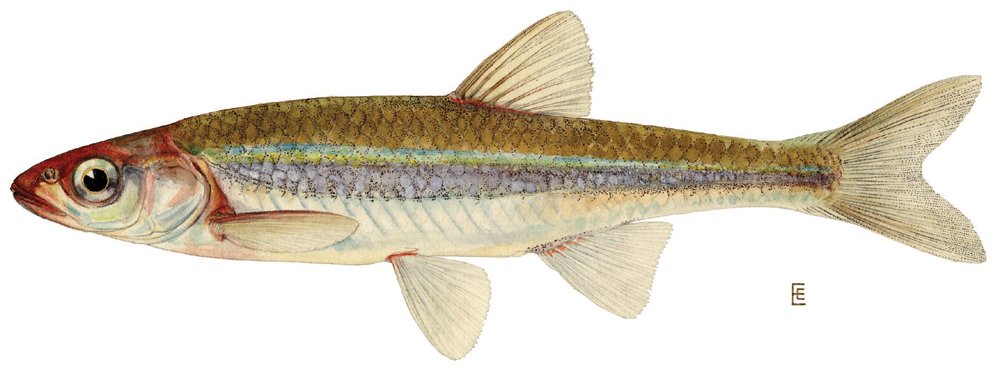

Conservation status
- Least Concern (IUCN 3.1)

Scientific classification
- Kingdom: Animalia
- Phylum: Chordata
- Class: Actinopterygii
- Division: Teleostei
- Order: Cypriniformes
- Family: Leuciscidae
- Subfamily: Pogonichthyinae
- Genus: Notropis
- Species: N. rubellus

Binomial name
- Notropis rubellus (Agassiz, 1850)

Synonyms
- Alburnus rubellus Aggasiz, 1850; Cyprinella lugubris Girard, 1856; Alburnus rubrifrons Cope, 1865; Alburnellus jaculus Cope, 1867; Leuciscus copii Günther, 1868

= Rosyface shiner =

Species of fish

The rosyface shiner (Notropis rubellus) is a species of freshwater ray-finned fish beloinging to the family Leuciscidae, the shiners, daces and minnows. It is native to eastern North America.

== Description ==
The species can grow up to 9 cm (3.5 in). They have a fusiform body shape with silvery sides with blue and green lateral iridescent stripes and transparent fins. Their pectoral and pelvic fins are in the abdominal region. They have a pointed snout with a terminal mouth position. The caudal fin is angled inwards to make a forked shape. Breeding males have red colorations on their face, head, and behind the gills. Breeding females will also have minimal red colorations.

== Distribution ==
The rosyface shiner's native range is in the eastern United States and southern Canada. They are found from eastern Wisconsin and in the drainages of the Great Lakes to New York, down south in the upper Ohio River, along the Appalachian Mountains and Cumberland Plateau to Tennessee, and down the James river, and Rapidan River which drain into the Atlantic Ocean.

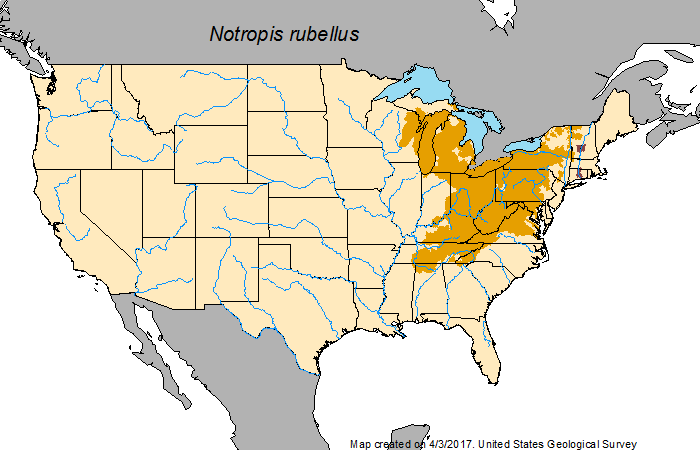
Orange areas of map show rosyface shiner distribution across the continental United States

== Habitat ==
They are freshwater fish living in large to moderate-sized streams with clear waters and fast flowing currents. Bottoms of streams have clean gravel or rubble usually in or around riffles. They are not conducive to streams with consistently murky waters. They are nonmigratory spending winters (mid- November)in deeper pools and eddies and then returning to the riffles in mid-March.

== Diet ==
The rosyface shiner is an omnivorous fish and has been reported to eat insects such as caddis fly larvae, mayfly nymphs, diptera, fish eggs, algae, diatoms, and other organic material, although insects make up a large majority of its diet. They are known to feed on insects on the surface of the water including terrestrial insects that fall into the water, but will also feed in mid-waters as well. They have even been known to jump out of the water to capture flying insects. In a study conducted by Roger J. Reed in 1957 rosyface shiners were reported to have 20% of fish with full stomachs during the months of late April to late May during pre-spawning activities. Feeding activities then picked back up again post-spawning in mid-June with 80% of the population having full stomachs.

== Reproduction ==
Pre-spawning activities include schools of both sexes circling between two pools below spawning riffles. The front of the school consists of females while the back of the school consists of males. Spawning takes place on a riffle at the head of the pool. Spawning area was over gravel at the bottom in the lower part of a riffle where water was 1 to 3 inches deep. Depressions 5 to 12 inches in diameter served as nests. Fish will vibrate together over a depression for 5 to 6 seconds, rest for 30 seconds and then repeat the cycle for about 5 minutes and then return to the pool, this cycle is repeated every 10 minutes. Both sexes are sexually mature after 1 year of life. One year old females have a fecundity of about 600 eggs and 3-year-old females have an average fecundity of 1,175. They live to be 3 years old.
