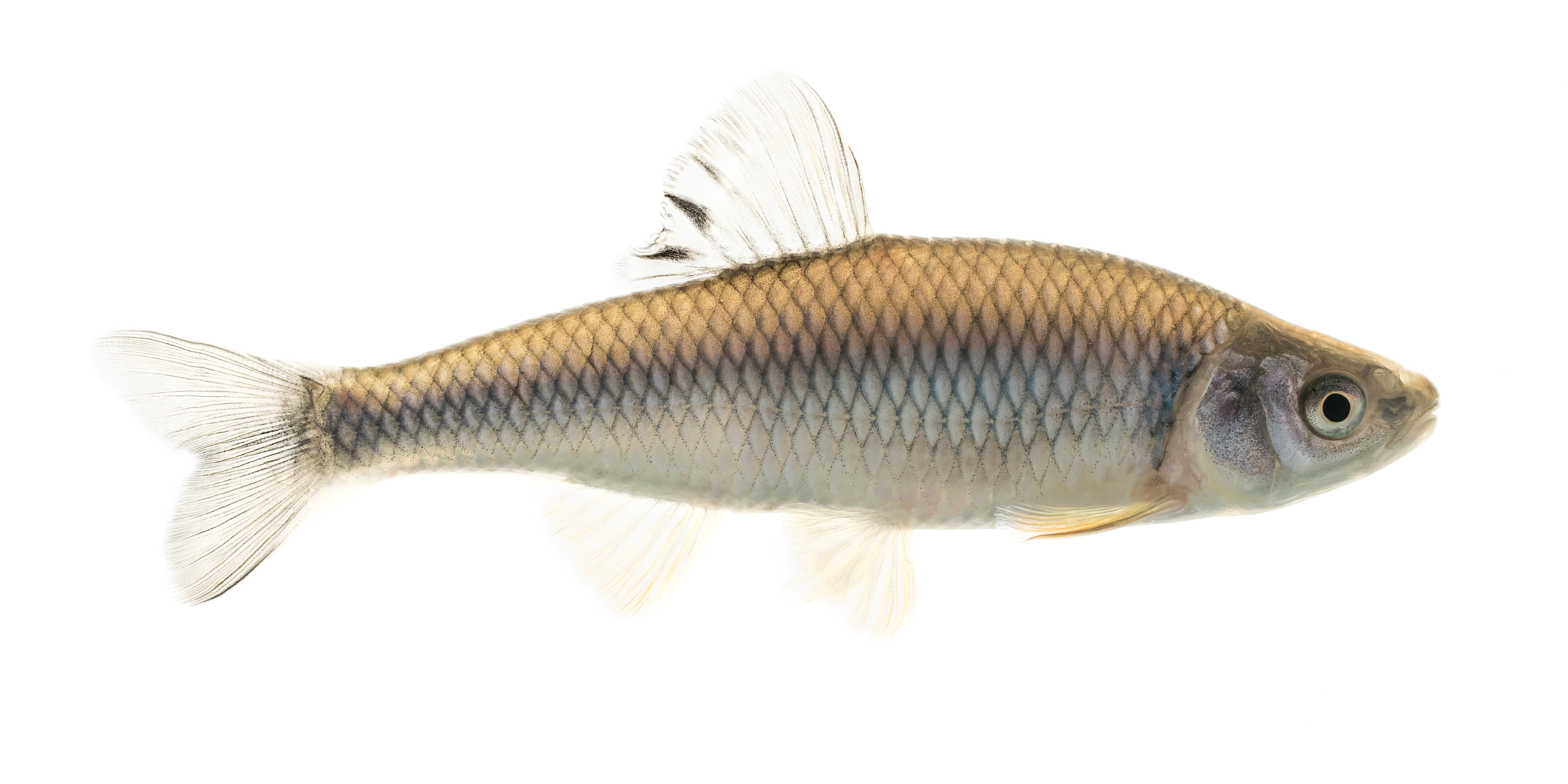

Conservation status
- Least Concern (IUCN 3.1)

- Secure (NatureServe)

Scientific classification
- Kingdom: Animalia
- Phylum: Chordata
- Class: Actinopterygii
- Order: Cypriniformes
- Family: Leuciscidae
- Subfamily: Pogonichthyinae
- Genus: Cyprinella
- Species: C. spiloptera

Binomial name
- Cyprinella spiloptera (Cope, 1867)

Synonyms
- Photogenis spilopterus (Cope, 1867); Notropis spilopterus Cope, 1867; Hybopsis fretensis Cope, 1867; Notropis spilopterus hypsisomatus Gibbs, 1958

= Cyprinella spiloptera =

Species of fish

Cyprinella spiloptera, the spotfin shiner is a species of freshwater ray-finned fish in the family Leuciscidae, the shiners, daces and minnows. It is a small sized freshwater fish found abundantly in many watercourses of North America.

== Taxonomy ==
Edward Drinker Cope described the spotfin shiner in 1867, it is known also as the silver-finned minnow or the satin-finned minnow.

== Description ==
The spotfin shiner has a black blotch of pigment on the membrane between its last three rays of the dorsal fin; this spot may be obscure or faint in small spotfin shiners. They are deep-bodied and have a black vertical bar posterior to their operculum. Their mouths open in the terminal position, they have diamond-shaped scales, and each scale is outlined with black pigment. Breeding males become heavily pigmented and steel bluish in color during late spring and early summer, and they have ventral fins that also become dull yellow to bright yellow. The heads of breeding male spotfin shiners become covered with small tubercles, and they feel rough, almost like sandpaper. Spotfin shiners also have 37–39 lateral line scales. Spotfin shiners have eight anal fin rays unlike its close relative, the satinfin.

== Distribution and habitat ==
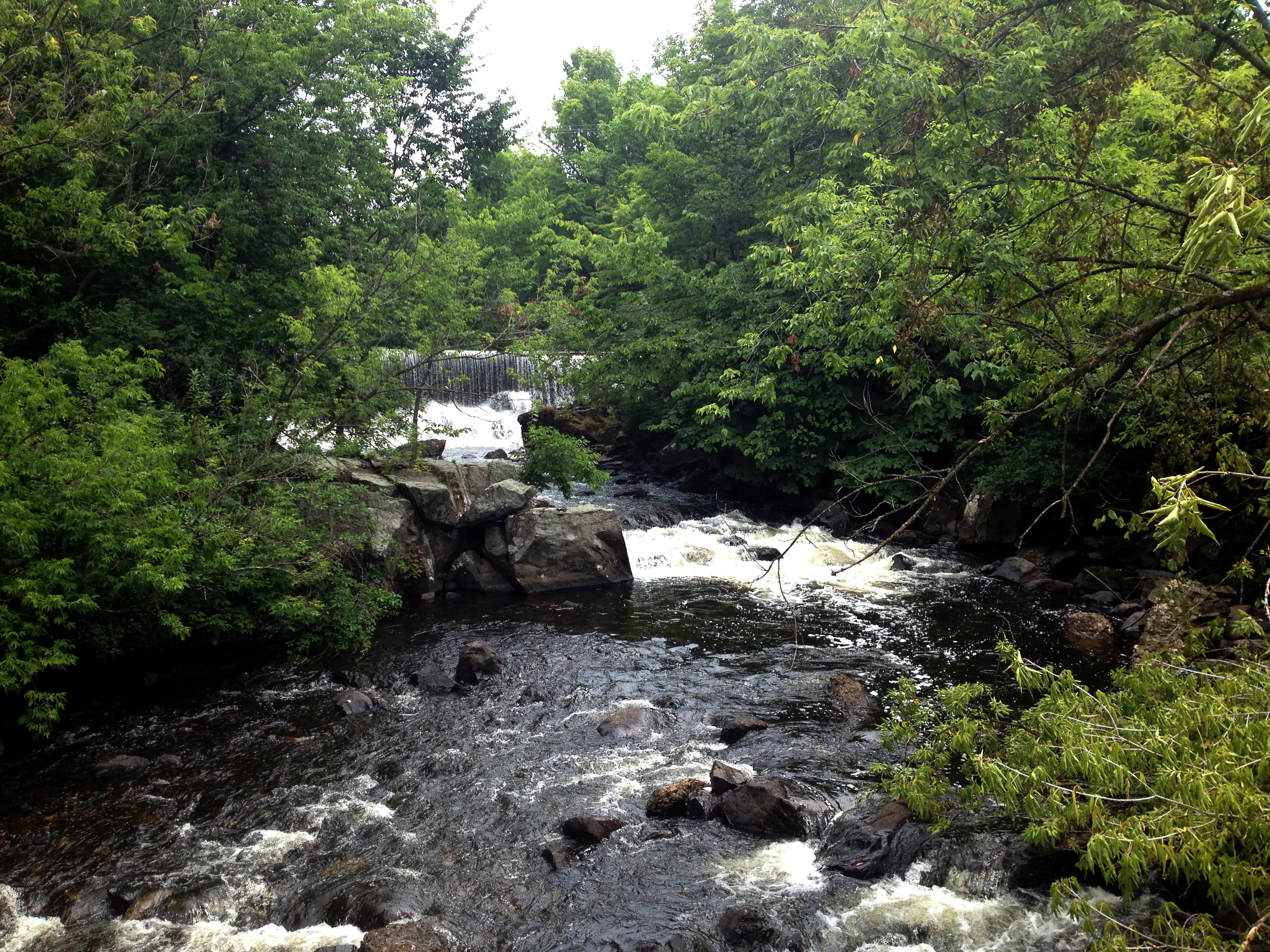
The North Yamaska river has a population of spotfin shiner.

Cyprinela spiloptera inhabit all but one of the Great Lakes (Superior), and are found from the Saint Lawrence drainage, Quebec to the Potomac river drainage, Virginia. They also inhabit areas from Ontario and New York to North Dakota, as well as south to Alabama and eastern regions of Oklahoma. C. spiloptera are also located in isolated areas of the Ozark mountains. C. spiloptera are freshwater, benthopologic fishes that prefer temperate climates. They inhabit sand and gravel runs and pools of creeks, as well as small to medium rivers with clear, permanent flow.

== Feeding ==
Adult C. spiloptera prey on surface insects and immature aquatic organisms.

== Conservation status ==
Currently, C. spiloptera are listed by the IUCN as having the least concern for conservation.

== Life cycle and reproduction ==
The spawning season of C. spiloptera lasts from mid-June until mid-August. Adult females deposit their eggs inside small crevices of rocks and submerged logs or roots. Their eggs, which typically hatch in about five days, are defended by the male. The maximum reported age of C. spiloptera is five years, but most usually only live to be around two years of age.

== Etymology ==
Cyprinella is Latin for carp, with the diminutive -ella and spiloptera is derived from the Latin words spilos, or spot and pteron, meaning wing or fin.
