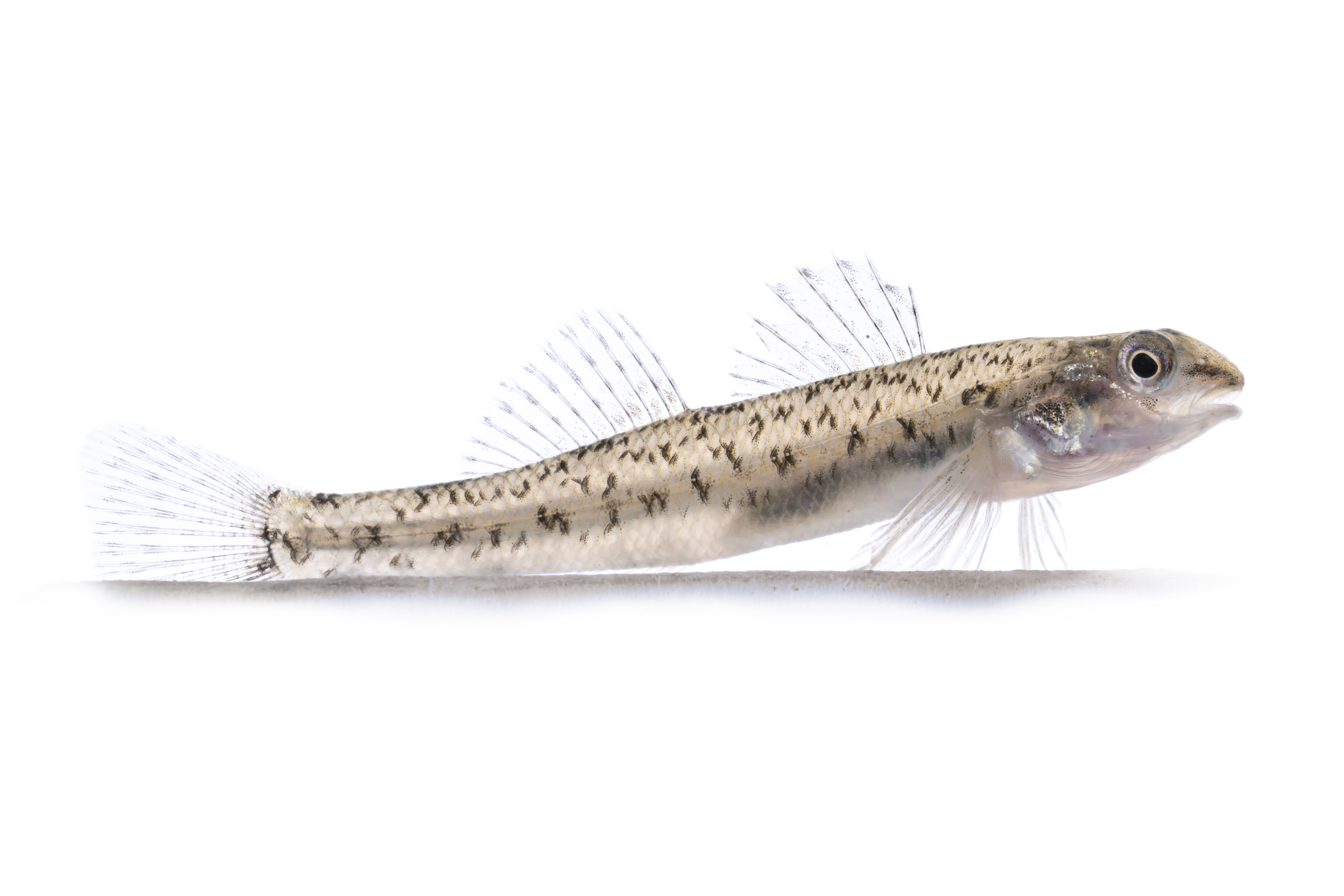

Conservation status
- Least Concern (IUCN 3.1)

Scientific classification
- Kingdom: Animalia
- Phylum: Chordata
- Class: Actinopterygii
- Order: Perciformes
- Family: Percidae
- Genus: Etheostoma
- Species: E. nigrum

Binomial name
- Etheostoma nigrum Rafinesque, 1820

Synonyms
- Etheostoma nigrum nigrum Rafinesque, 1820

= Johnny darter =

Species of fish

The johnny darter (Etheostoma nigrum) is a species of freshwater ray-finned fish, a darter from the subfamily Etheostomatinae, part of the family Percidae, which also contains the perches, ruffes and pikeperches. It is native to shallow waters throughout North America east of the Rocky Mountains.

== Etymology ==
The johnny darter's Latin name comes from the Greek root words etheo, meaning to filter, stoma, meaning mouth, and nigrum, meaning black.

== Geographic distribution ==
The johnny darter is found from Saskatchewan and Colorado to the Atlantic seaboard and from Hudson Bay south to the Gulf Coast drainage systems. They are the most common darter in Minnesota and Ohio.

== Description ==
The johnny darter can reach a length of 7.2 centimetres (2.8 in) TL though most only reach about 3.9 centimetres (1.5 in). Males weigh a little over 2.0 grams, and the females weigh about 1.6 grams. These small, slender fish have brown to yellow scales, paler sides, and whitish bellies. They have no bright colors and generally just have brown or black markings on a lighter tan background. These markings are usually a series of black "w" or "x" shapes along their sides running along their lateral lines. On the fish, the opercles (or bony areas forming the gill covers) have scales, whereas the preopercles (bone at the start of the cheek), napes, and breasts are scaleless. The johnny darter has two dorsal fins, the first has hard (spinous) rays, while the second is soft-rayed (flexible). The pectoral and pelvic fins are close to each other behind the gills. The pectorals are large and fan-like and are situated on the lower sides of the fish. The pelvic fins are small and round and situated in the ventral side of the fish. They have a rounded tail fin on the ventral side, as well.

== Habitat, diet, and predators ==
Johnny darters prefer clear water with sandy and gravelly bottoms. They like slow-moving water, but can be found in moderately cloudy, moving water, as well. They are bottom dwellers and stay on rocks at the bottoms of small ponds and streams with their heads facing into the current. Of all the darter species, the johnny darter is the most tolerant of diverse conditions. Since this darter is a benthic, its mouth is a subterminal where the nose is only slightly beyond the mouth and is situated in an inferior position that makes it easy for it to eat and catch food. Its diet is varied, but as young fish, it tends to eat copepods, small crustaceans, and waterfleas. As it grows, the fish start eating larger waterfleas, different types of larvae, including midges, mayflies, and caddisflies, and the occasional sideswimmer. These darters are generally eaten by larger predatory fish, such as burbots, lake trout, smallmouth bass, walleyes, and yellow perch.

== Breeding ==
The spawning season is May and most of June, when the water temperatures are between 12 and 24 °C. Males arrive first to establish territories throughout the pond, lake, or stream. Spawning occurs in the shallow water, pools and slow runs, with large rocks, logs, cans, shells, or other debris. When a female approaches the nest, the male darts at her and chases her out of the territory. However, when she approaches the nest upside down and tries to enter, the male will accept her. They then both turn upside down and the female will lay between 30 and 200 eggs on the underside of the debris. Johnny darters are not monogamous and the female and male will spawn with other fish. A single nest may hold up to 1000 developing eggs. The male will guard the nest and keep them oxygenated and will eat the ones that develop fungus until the embryos hatch, which is after about six to 10 days.

== Conservation status ==
These fish are not considered threatened throughout most of their range. They are considered vulnerable only in Arkansas, Kentucky, Oklahoma, Kansas, and Nebraska. In Minnesota, they have no special conservation status, but are protected by state law.
