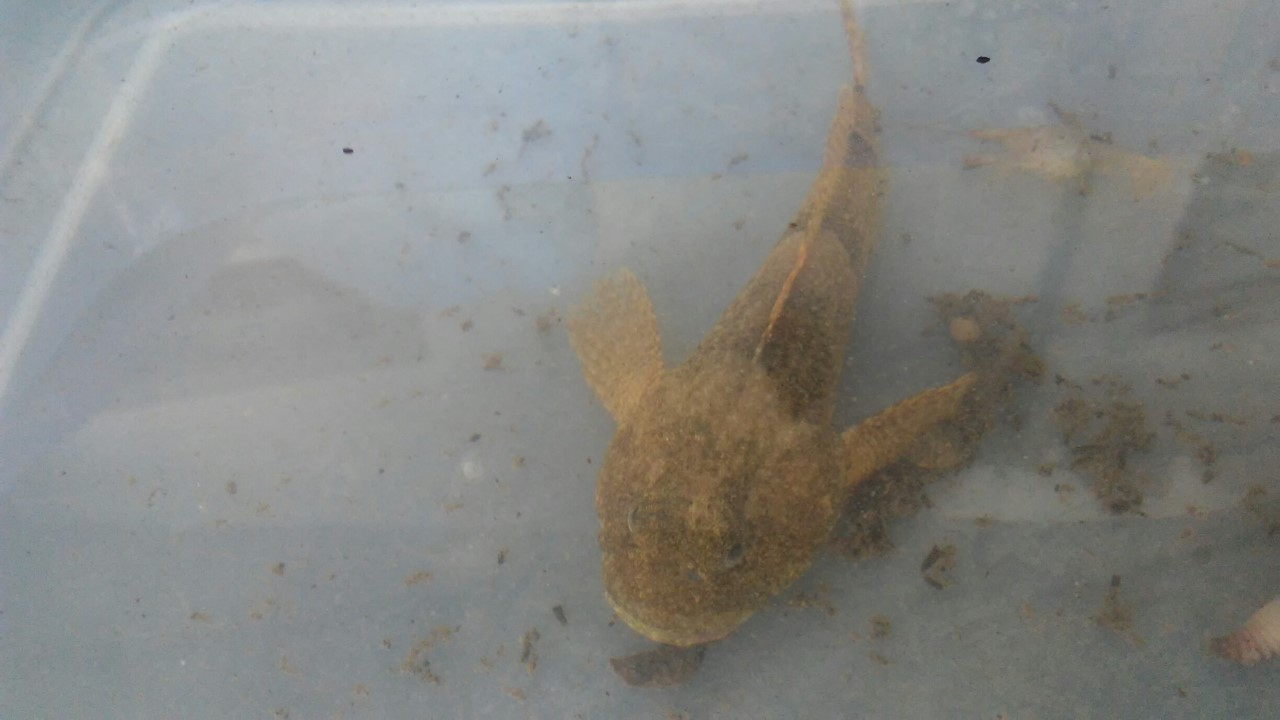

Conservation status
- Least Concern (IUCN 3.1)

Scientific classification
- Kingdom: Animalia
- Phylum: Chordata
- Class: Actinopterygii
- Division: Teleostei
- Order: Perciformes
- Suborder: Cottoidei
- Family: Cottidae
- Genus: Cottus
- Species: C. bairdii

Binomial name
- Cottus bairdii Girard, 1850

Synonyms
- Cottus bairdii bairdii Girard, 1850; Cottus hubbsi bairdii Girard, 1850; Pegedictis ictalops Rafinesque, 1820; Cottus ictalops (Rafinesque, 1820); Cottus richardsoni Agassiz, 1850; Uranidea richardsoni (Agassiz, 1850); Cottus meridionalis Girard, 1850; Potamocottus punctulatus Gill, 1861; Cottus bairdii punctulatus (Gill, 1861); Cottus punctulatus (Gill, 1861); Cottopsis semiscaber Cope, 1872; Cottus bairdii semiscaber (Cope, 1872); Cottus semiscaber (Cope, 1872); Uranidea kumlieni Hoy, 1876; Cottus bairdii kumlieni (Hoy, 1876)

= Mottled sculpin =

Species of fish

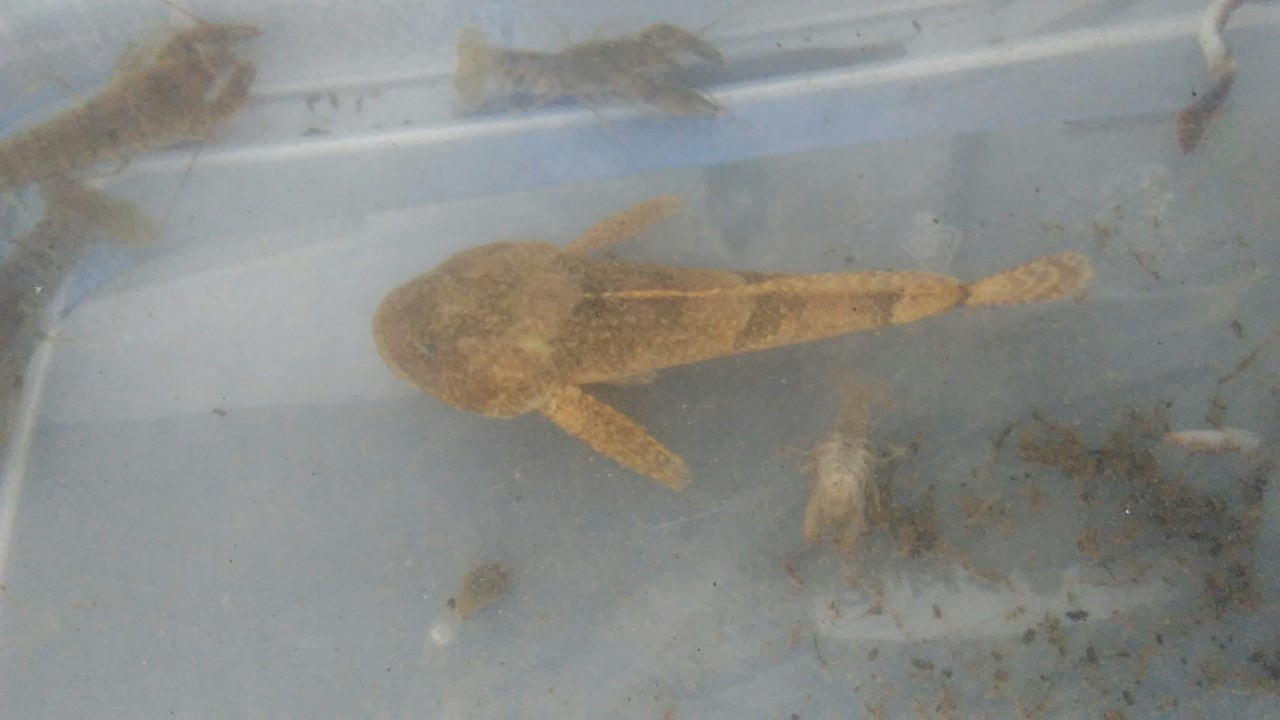

The mottled sculpin (Cottus bairdii) is a species of freshwater ray-finned fish belonging to the family Cottidae, the typical sculpins. This species has a wide but scattered North American distribution.

As the name suggests, its coloration is a combination of bars, spots, and speckles randomly distributed. The large pectoral fins are banded. The first dorsal fin is made of slender and somewhat soft spines, and just barely joins with the second dorsal. Maximum length is 15 cm.

It feeds primarily on aquatic insect larvae, but will also eat crustaceans, small fish, fish eggs, and some plant material. In turn, the sculpin is preyed upon by other fish, notably trout. Favored habitat is well-oxygenated and clear water, such as over gravel riffles in mountain streams, springs, and along rocky lake shores.

Spawning takes place during early winter and late spring. The male's head becomes darker, and he selects a protected nest site, such as under a rock or ledge. After courtship, the female enters the nest, turns upside down, and deposits her eggs on the ceiling, where they adhere. Typically several females will deposit eggs in a nest, then the male fertilizes and guards them, fanning the eggs with his pectoral fins.

Mottled sculpin occurrence is discontinuous in its range. It is widespread from the Tennessee River north to Labrador, while separate populations are found in the Missouri River, the Columbia River system in southern Canada, and the Bonneville system of the Great Basin.

== Introduction ==
Mottled sculpins, Cottus bairdi, are a common fish throughout most of North America. The only area that mottled sculpin are provided limited protection is in New Mexico. Mottled sculpins feed on a wide variety of organisms, including mollusks, snails, other mottled sculpins, and trout. Their diets are mainly made up of bottom-dwelling benthic insects. The favored habitat of a mottled sculpin is one rich in macroinvertebrate prey, which usually occurs in fast riffle areas with clear substrates and moderate velocities between 0.20 m/s to 0.38 m/s. Spawning season for the mottled sculpin starts in April or May with the males taking up residency in benthic rocks. The breeding season lasts for two to three months. Clutch sizes can vary anywhere from 8 eggs to 148 eggs for females. Males can have up to 1587 eggs in their nest. Sexual maturity is thought to be reached at two years of age. Climate change does not seem to be a threat to this species since they inhabit a wide range of temperature gradients throughout the United States. However, one human activity that affects them is runoff from mining, which particularly is harmful to the newly hatched larvae and developing eggs. Nothing is currently being done anent current management for the mottled sculpin because it is a very abundant fish where it occurs. Future management could focus on the different metals that leak into the water from mining. The absence of the mottled sculpin from an area could tell us that the area has high levels of zinc, cadmium, or copper.

== Geographic distribution of species ==
The mottled sculpin, Cottus bairdii, is known to inhabit a large geographical range in North America. Their natural habitat range is from Northern Canada down to the Mobile and Tennessee River drainage systems. They are also commonly found in streams in the Rocky Mountains along with many streams found throughout the Midwest United States. The mottled sculpin has historically been found throughout all the environments listed above. For the most part, the geographical range of the mottled sculpin has not changed throughout the years due to it is being a resilient fish and because it has a large temperature gradient in which it can reside. However, in a study by Besser and others in 2007, mottled sculpins have been absent in streams thought to be populated by them in the past due to the species being more sensitive to toxic levels of cadmium, copper, and zinc than species of salmonids. Of these three metals zinc seems to be the most threatening to the mottled sculpin. One study found mottled sculpins to be the third most sensitive aquatic species to zinc. Therefore, the biggest threat to the species would be high mining areas or areas where coal is burned frequently.

== Ecology ==
Mottled sculpins are known for living in fast moving current areas where they feed primarily on bottom dwelling aquatic insects. One study found that bottom dwelling aquatic insects make up 99.7% of the mottled sculpin's diet, with dipterous larvae and pupae being the most common type found. The remaining 0.3% was made up of snails, fingernail clams, water mites, sculpin eggs and fish. Thus the mottled sculpin is not a major threat to game fish though it has been found to eat trout eggs. Sculpin are cannibalistic. Males are known to eat their young if one contracts some kind of virus or fungus. The males also eat small females. Therefore, older females are usually chosen for mates over younger females.

The main predators of the sculpin are different species of game fish, such as brook trout, brown trout, northern pike, and smallmouth bass. All sculpin species are expected to coexist with species from the family Salmonidae. Its main competitors are other small bottom dwelling fish, especially other sculpin species. Female and immature mottled sculpins are commonly found in clean water rock substrates. On the other hand, males are commonly found in algae beds. The mean current velocity in which the fish is found is 0.28 m/s. They prefer to inhabit cool clear streams. They will tolerate warmer streams but do not prefer them like Cottus girardi.

== Life history ==
Mottled sculpin reach sexual maturity at the age of two. The breeding season for mottled sculpin is during April and May. At the beginning of the season the males will take refuge under flat-bottomed rocks, waterlogged wood or other rubble found in stream beds. In order to mate the female will come up to the males nest and lay her eggs there. The female chooses her mate on physical attributes. Since larger males pick out nesting sites with better resources qualities, the female's choice of the largest male indicates she is picking good genes in a mate and also a good environment for her young to grow up After mating she either leaves or is chased away by the male. The males do this because females will eat the eggs right after spawning if the male does not run her off. The males continue to protect the eggs until they have absorbed their yolk sac and are ready to distribute themselves.

Mottled sculpins only mate once a year. The clutch size can vary anywhere from 8 eggs to 148 eggs for females. However within that year one male could mate with ten or more females This leads to very large nest sizes. One study looked at twelve different nesting sites within a year and found that one nest can have anywhere from 54 to 1587 eggs with an average of 744 eggs per nest. Mottled sculpins' average life span is six years.

== Conservation ==
The mottled sculpin is currently not federal or state listed for being threatened or endangered. In New Mexico the species is given limited protection. The reason for the species receiving no current management plan is due to its high abundance all over North America. Its high prevalence is due to the species tolerance' for all types of environment.

Although the species is not threatened anywhere in North America, it has received attention in recent areas in the Western United States due to its absence in some streams that are highly populated with trout species but not sculpins. This was odd since the two species usually coexist in similar habitats. The problem was that the streams absent of sculpin had high concentrations of zinc. One study showed that mottled sculpin are the third most sensitive species to high levels of zinc. The reason this occurring is because the U.S. Environmental Protection Agency (EPA) uses trout species to determine the water quality criteria (WQC) for zinc. Therefore, the WQC standards are not good enough to protect all species of fish. In southeast Minnesota there are plans to rebuild the sculpin population in streams where the water quality was once unfavorable for the species but has since been improved. The next step is to introduce 200 mottled sculpin a year until the population is showing signs of a comeback in the local streams.

However zinc is not the only metal threatening mottled sculpin populations. One study found mottled sculpins were also more sensitive to levels of copper and cadmium than other species of fish. The leading causes of increase of these three metals into aquatic environments are from mining, the burning of coal, steel production, and smelting metals.
