= List of fishes of Indiana =

The state of Indiana is home to 208 species of fishes that inhabit its rivers, lakes, and streams that make up five watersheds. Indiana is the state with the most fish species of any state north of the Ohio River and includes Great Lakes species.

== Native fishes taxa ==
Status is determined from IUCN data in a global context. Classifications include critically endangered CR, endangered EN, vulnerable VU, near-threatened NT, and least concern LC.

Common name	Scientific name	Picture	Status
Lampreys	=== Petromyzontiformes (order) ===		
	==== Petromyzontidae (family) ====		
Chestnut lamprey	Icthyomyzon castaneus		LC
Northern brook lamprey	Icthyomyzon fossor		LC
American brook lamprey	Lampetra appendix		LC
Sturgeons and paddlefish	=== Acipenseriformes (order) ===		
	==== Acipenseridae (family) ====		
Lake sturgeon	Acipenser fulvescens		LC
Shovelnose sturgeon	Scaphirhynchus platorynchus		VU
	==== Polyodontidae (family) ====		
American paddlefish	Polyodon spathula		VU
Bowfin	=== Amiiformes (order) ===		
	==== Amiidae (family) ====		
Bowfin	Amia calva		LC
Mooneyes	=== Hiodontiformes (order) ===		
	==== Hiodontidae (family) ====		
Goldeye	Hiodon alosoides		LC
Mooneye	Hiodon tergisus		LC
Eels	=== Anguilliformes (order) ===		
	==== Anguillidae (family) ====		
American eel	Anguilla rostrata		EN
Carps, minnows, and relatives	=== Cypriniformes (order) ===		
	==== Cyprinidae (family) ====		
Southern redbelly dace	Chrosomus erythrogaster		LC
Gizzard shad	Dorosoma cepedianum		LC
Cypress minnow	Hybognathus hayi	N/A	LC
Bigeye chub	Hybopsis amblops		LC
Golden shiner	Notemigonus crysoleucas		LC
Striped shiner	Luxilus chrysocephalus		LC
Blackchin shiner	Notropis heterodon		LC
Silverjaw minnow	Notropis buccatus		LC
Bigeye shiner	Notropis boops	N/A	LC
Pallid shiner	Hybopsis amnis	N/A	LC
Shoal chub	Macrhybopsis hyostoma		LC
Pugnose shiner	Notropis anogenus	N/A	LC
Emerald shiner	Notropis atherinoides		LC
Ghost shiner	Notropis buchanani		LC
Ironcolor shiner	Notropis chalybaeus		LC
Rosyface shiner	Notropis rubellus		LC
Weed shiner	Notropis teanus	N/A	LC
Mimic shiner	Notropis volucellus		LC
Popeye shiner	Notropis ariommus		LC
Suckermouth minnow	Phenacobius mirabilis		LC
Bluntnose minnow	Pimphales notalus		LC
Pugnose minnow	Opsopoedus emiliae		LC
Fathead minnow	Pimephales promelas		LC
Bullhead minnow	Pimephales vigilax		LC
Western blacknose dace	Rhinichthys obtusus		LC
Longnose dace	Rhinichthys cataractae		LC
	==== Catostomidae (family) ====		
White sucker	Catostomus commersonii		LC
Blue sucker	Cycleptus elongatus		LC
Bigmouth buffalo	Ictiobus cyprinellus		LC
Smallmouth buffalo	Ictiobus bubalus		LC
Black buffalo	Ictiobus niger		LC
Spotted sucker	Minytrema melanops		LC
River redhorse	Moxostoma carinatum		LC
Harelip sucker	Moxostoma lacerum	N/A	Extinct
Catfishes	=== Siluriformes (order) ===		
	==== Ictaluridae (family) ====		
Blue catfish	Ictalurus furcatus		LC
Channel catfish	Ictalurus punctatus		LC
Black bullhead	Ameiurus melas		LC
Yellow bullhead	Ameirus natalis		LC
Stonecat	Notorus flavus		LC
Flathead catfish	Pylodicitis olivaris		LC
Pikes and Mudminnows	=== Esociformes (order) ===		
	==== Esocidae (family) ====		
Muskellunge	Esox masquinongy		LC
Northern pike	Esox lucius		LC
Salmon, Trout, Chars. Freshwater Whitefishes, Graylings	=== Salmoniformes (order) ===		
	==== Salmonidae (family) ====		
Chinook salmon	Oncorhynchus tshawytscha		
Atlantic salmon	Salmo salar		LC
Brown trout	Salmo trutta		LC
Brook trout	Salvelinus fontinalis		LC
Lake trout	Salvelinus namaycush		
Toothcarps	=== Cyprinodontiformes (order) ===		
	==== Fundulidae (family) ====		
Banded killifish	Fundulus diaphanus		LC
Blackstrip topminnow	Fundulus notatus	N/A	LC
Northern studfish	Fundulus catenatus		LC
Mail-cheeked fishes	=== Scopaeniformes (order) ===		
	==== Cottidae (family) ====		
Banded sculpin	Cottus carolinae		LC
Mottled sculpin	Cottus bairdii		LC
Slimy sculpin	Cottus cognatus		LC
Deepwater sculpin	Myoxocephalus thompsonii		LC
Sunfishes and perches	=== Perciformes (order) ===		
	==== Centrarchidae (family) ====		
Green sunfish	Lepomis cyanellus		LC
Orangespotted sunfish	Lepomis humilis		LC
Bluegill	Lepomis macrochirus		LC
Redspotted sunfish	Lepomis microlophus	N/A	LC
Northern sunfish	Lepomis peltastes	N/A	
Smallmouth bass	Micropterus dolomieu		LC
Largemouth bass	Micropterus salmoides		LC
Black crappie	Pomoxis nigromaculatus		LC
White crappie	Pomoxis annularis		LC
	==== Percidae (family) ====		
Walleye	Sander vitreus		LC
Sauger	Sander canadensis		LC
Yellow perch	Perca flavescens		LC
Logperch	Percina caprodes		LC
Stargazing darter	Percina uranidea	N/A	NT
Channel darter	Percina copelandi		LC
Gilt darter	Percina evides		LC
Dusky darter	Percina sciera		LC
River darter	Percina shumardi		LC
Tippecanoe darter	Etheostoma tippecanoe		NT
Spottail darter	Etheostoma squamiceps		LC
Banded darter	Etheostoma zonale		LC
Johnny darter	Etheostoma nigrum		LC
Iowa darter	Etheostoma exile		LC
Western sand darter	Ammocrypta clara	N/A	VU
Eastern sand darter	Ammocrypta pellucida		LC
Mud darter	Etheostoma asprigene		LC
Rainbow darter	Etheostoma caeruleum		LC
Fantail darter	Etheostoma flabellare		LC
Harlequin darter	Etheostoma histrio		LC
Least darter	Etheostoma microperca		LC
Cypress darter	Etheostoma proeliare	N/A	LC
Bluebreast darter	Etheostoma camurum		LC
Bluntnose darter	Etheostoma chlorosoma	N/A	
Orangethroat darter	Etheostoma spectabile		LC
Variegate darter	Etheostoma variatum		LC
	==== Moronidae (family) ====		
Yellow bass	Morone mississippiensis		LC
White bass	Morone chrysops		LC
Gobies	=== Gobiiformes (order) ===		
	==== Gobiidae (family) ====		
Round goby	Neogobius melanostomus		LC

== Exotic or introduced taxa ==
Common name	Scientific name	Picture	Status
Lamprey	=== Petromyzontiformes (order) ===		
	==== Petromyzontidae (family) ====		
Sea lamprey	Petromyzon marinus		LC
Herring	=== Clupeiformes (order) ===		
	==== Clupeidae (family) ====		
Alewife	Alosa pseudoharengus		LC
Threadfin shad	Dorosoma petenense		LC
Carps, minnows, and relatives	=== Cypriniformes (order) ===		
	==== Cyprinidae (family) ====		
Goldfish	Carassius auratus		LC
Grass carp	Ctenopharyngodon idella		
Red shiner	Cyprinella lutrensis		LC
Carp	Cyprinus carpio		
Silver carp	Hypophthalmichthys molitrix		NT
Bighead carp	Hypophthalmichthys nobilis		
Rudd	Scardinius erythrophthalmus	N/A	EN
Catfish	=== Siluriformes (order) ===		
	==== Ictaluridae (family) ====		
White catfish	Ameiurus catus		LC
Salmon, trout, chars. freshwater Whitefishes, graylings	=== Salmoniformes (order) ===		
	==== Osmeridae (family) ====		
Rainbow smelt	Osmerus mordax		LC
	==== Salmonidae (family) ====		
Coho salmon	Oncorhyncus kitsutch		
Rainbow trout	Oncorhyncus mykiss		
Chinook salmon	Oncorhynchus tshawytscha		
Atlantic salmon	Salmo salar		LC
Brown trout	Salmo trutta		LC
Silversides	=== Atheriniformes (order) ===		
	==== Atherinidae (family) ====		
Inland silverside	Menidia beryllina		LC
Mullets	=== Mugiliformes (order) ===		
	==== Mugilidae (family) ====		
Striped mullet	Mugil cephalus		LC
Sticklebacks	=== Gasterosteiformes (order) ===		
	==== Gasterosteidae (family) ====		
Threespine stickleback	Gasterosteus aculeatus		LC
Sunfishes and Perches	=== Perciformes (order) ===		
	==== Moronidae (family) ====		
White perch	Morone americana		LC
Striped bass	Morone saxatilis		LC
Gobies	=== Gobiiformes (order) ===		
	==== Gobiidae (family) ====		
Round goby	Neogobius melanostomus		LC
