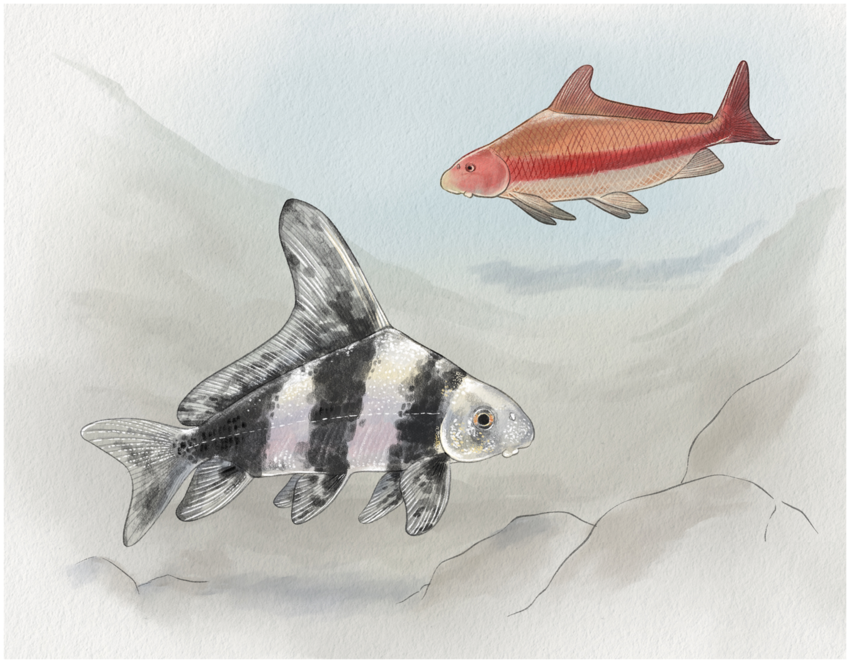
- Juvenile (left) and adult Myxocyprinus

Conservation status
- Vulnerable (IUCN 3.1)

Scientific classification
- Kingdom: Animalia
- Phylum: Chordata
- Class: Actinopterygii
- Division: Teleostei
- Order: Cypriniformes
- Family: Catostomidae
- Subfamily: Myxocyprininae; Fowler, 1958
- Genus: Myxocyprinus (T. N. Gill, 1878)
- Species: M. asiaticus

Binomial name
- Myxocyprinus asiaticus (Bleeker, 1864)

Synonyms
- Carpiodes asiaticus Bleeker, 1864; Carpiodes chinensis Dabry de Thiersant, 1872; Sclerognathus chinensis Günther, 1889; Myxocyprinus asiaticus subsp. nankinensis Tchang, 1929

= Myxocyprinus =

Species of fish

Myxocyprinus is a monotypic genus of freshwater fish in the monotypic subfamily Myxocyprininae within the family Catostomidae, with its only species being Myxocyprinus asiaticus. It grows to about 1.35 m (4 ft 5 in) long.

== Nomenclature ==
In the aquarium trade, this species is known under various common names (as a marketing effort), including the Chinese sucker, Chinese high-fin banded shark, Chinese banded shark, Chinese sailfin sucker, high-fin (also spelled hi-fin) banded loach, high-fin loach, Chinese high-fin sucker, sailfin sucker, topsail sucker, Asian sucker, wimple carp, wimple, freshwater batfish, Chinese or Asian zebra high-fin shark, Chinese or Asian zebra high-fin sucker, Chinese emperor, Siamese sucker, and entsuyui in Japanese. Despite its common names, it bears no relation to real sharks.

== Description ==
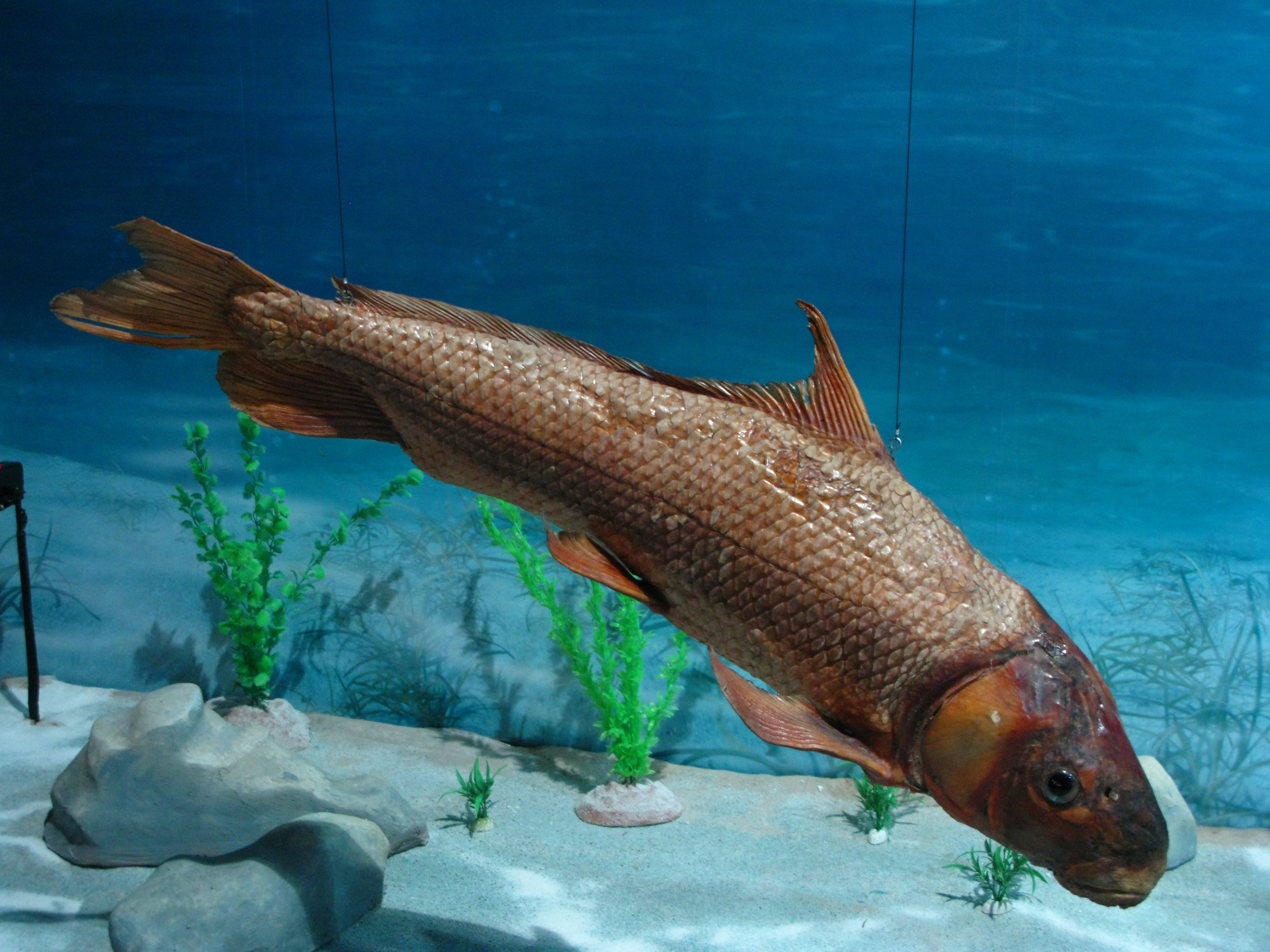
Adult Myxocyprynus, mounted specimen

Young Myxocyprinus normally possess brown bodies bearing three dark-colored slanting bands, and they are also characterized by high and triangular dorsal fins that extends up to the rear of the anal fin. The thick and fleshy lips bear small papillae without barbels. They have a single row of pharyngeal teeth that have comb-like arrangements.

Through adulthood, Myxocyprinus become darker in appearance. The characteristic pale bands found in young specimens disappear at a length of 30–36 cm (12–14 in), and the species has been referred to as an "ugly duckling in reverse". The growth is fast; it grows at the rate of one inch per year. Sexual maturity is reached when five to six years old and at least 60 cm (2 ft) long. The maximum size reached by this fish is 1.35 m (4 ft 5 in) in length and 40 kg (88 lb) in weight.

In its natural habitat, Myxocyprinus live for more than 25 years and reach sexual maturity in 5 years for males and 6 years for females. During the breeding season, adult males are distinguished from adult females by their red coloration. Adult females are of dark purple color with a broad and vertical reddish area along the body.

The eggs are 1.8–2.0 mm (0.071–0.079 in) in diameter, and expanded to 3.8–4.0 mm (0.15–0.16 in) after absorbing water and fertilization. The eggs develop into 9 mm (0.35 in)-long larvae after 163 hours at 18.7 °C (65.7 °F), and a further 9 to 10 days to develop into juveniles.

=== Genetics ===
The genome of Myxocyprinus has been extensively studied, including its mitogenome.

A 2018 study of mtDNA, nDNA, and morphological data suggested that Myxocyprinus (along with its sister genus †Plesiomyxocyprinus) are some of the most basal of the Catostomidae, being the sister group to Cycleptus; this pair of genera is in turn sister to Ictiobinae, and the three groups as a whole form a clade at the base of the catostomid phylogeny.

== Distribution and habitat ==
Myxocyprinus are native to the Yangtze River basin of China. They are potamodromous, migrating into relatively fast flowing, shallow headwaters to spawn, but spend the remaining time in the main river sections. The population in the Min River, a tributary of the Yangtze, may have been extirpated. Historically, they also inhabited the Yalong and Jialing Rivers.

== Relation to humans ==
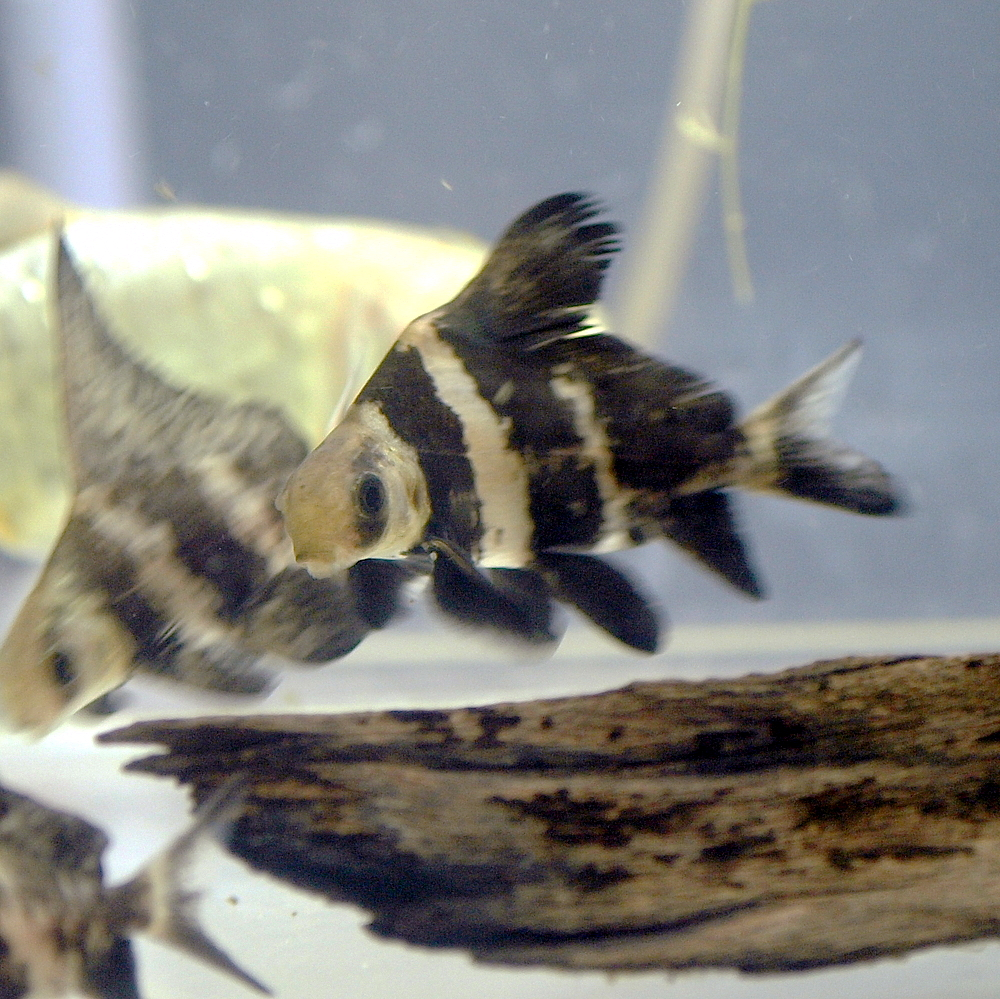
Juveniles are often sold in aquarium stores

The species is widely aquacultured in China to supply the food industry. Myxocyprinus may also be used to prevent hepatopancreatic lesion syndrome from affecting yields of river crab (Eriocheir sinensis) through intercropping. A rhabdovirus was isolated from aquacultured specimens, which causes lethal haemorrhaging in the species.

Juveniles are often bought as aquarium cleaners, as they may feed on uneaten food on the bottom. Adults are unsuitable for most home aquariums, though are sometimes kept to accompany koi in ponds.

=== Conservation ===
The species has declined drastically due to pollution, dams (preventing its natural breeding migration), overfishing, introduced species and collection for the aquarium trade. As a consequence it has been placed on the Chinese list of endangered species and is a state protected species, being a second-class national protected species in the country.

Hatcheries have been used in an effort to conserve this species, which has resulted in some alterations to the species' genetic structure; haplotype diversity is higher in wild populations, though nucleotide diversity is "almost identical". The genetic diversity of broodstocks in some facilities is not high, which may necessitate supplementation of wild-caught broodstocks. "Relatively high" gene flow was noted between samples of hatchery and wild populations, suggesting that interbreeding is not uncommon between the two.

== See also ==
- List of endangered and protected species of China
