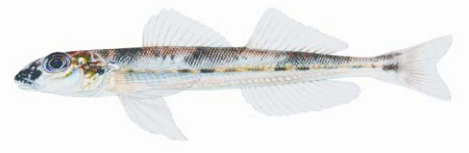

Conservation status
- Critically Endangered (IUCN 3.1)

Scientific classification
- Kingdom: Animalia
- Phylum: Chordata
- Class: Actinopterygii
- Division: Teleostei
- Order: Perciformes
- Family: Percidae
- Genus: Crystallaria
- Species: C. cincotta

Binomial name
- Crystallaria cincotta S. A. Welsh & R. M. Wood, 2008

= Diamond darter =

Species of fish

The diamond darter (Crystallaria cincotta) is a species of freshwater ray-finned fish, a darter from the subfamily Etheostomatinae, part of the family Percidae, which also contains the perches, ruffes and pikeperches. It is named for the sparkling light it reflects during nighttime collections. The diamond darter was first described in 2008 and is only the second known member of its genus, which also includes the crystal darter, C. asprella. On July 26, 2013, the United States Fish and Wildlife Service formally designated the diamond darter as an endangered species under the Endangered Species Act of 1973.

== Description ==
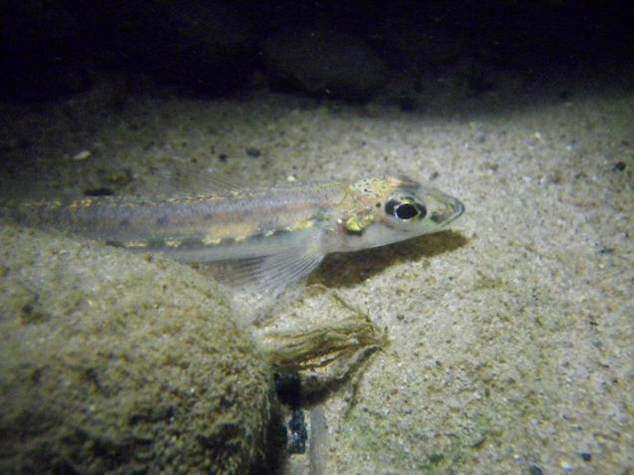

Diamond darters have 11 to 13 spines on their dorsal fins, and 11 to 15 soft rays. However, their anal fins do not have any spines at all, and only 11 to 13 soft rays. Adults are estimated to be 3–5 inches (7.6–12.7 cm) long, with the largest specimen measuring 7.7 cm, roughly 3.0 in.

Diamond darters bear a strong resemblance to crystal darters, their relatives. Both fishes are translucent, and have olive-colored patterns on their bodies. Diamond darters differ in that they have a gape equal to or larger than the width of the base of their interpelvic fins, which are shaped like sickles. They also have blotches in front of the eyes that are separate from the orbital rim. The diamond darter has fewer dorsal spines and anal rays than the crystal darter. It also has fewer rows of scales on the cheek (2), and opercle (2).

== Distribution ==
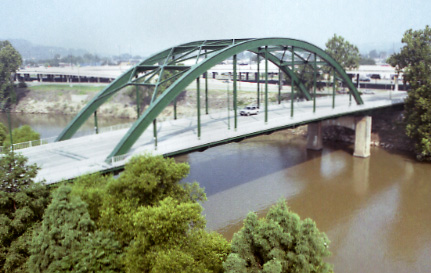
The diamond darter was originally collected from areas of the Elk River, seen here from Charleston, West Virginia

The diamond darter was described from specimens collected from the drainages of the Cumberland, Elk, Green, and Muskingum Rivers, which are all part of the Ohio River basin, from 1980 to 2005. Because of river alterations, and problems with water quality, the diamond darter's range has become greatly diminished. As of 2008, the fish is only known to still live in the Elk River, West Virginia. The effect of the 2014 Elk River chemical spill to the diamond darter is still unknown.
