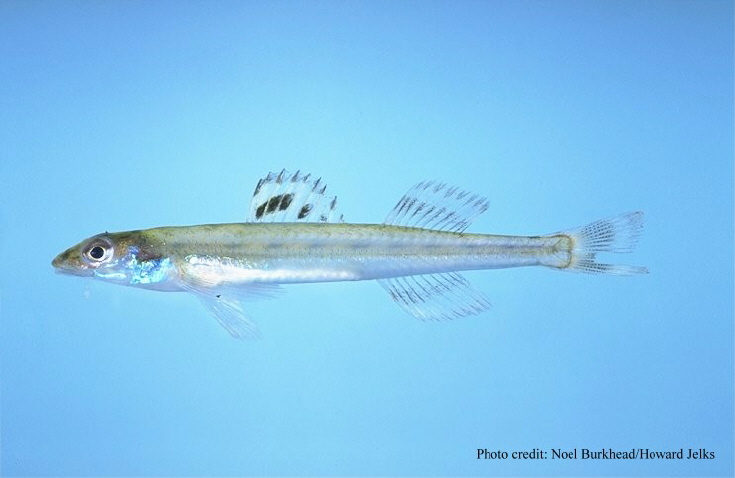

Conservation status
- Least Concern (IUCN 3.1)

Scientific classification
- Kingdom: Animalia
- Phylum: Chordata
- Class: Actinopterygii
- Order: Perciformes
- Family: Percidae
- Genus: Ammocrypta
- Species: A. bifascia

Binomial name
- Ammocrypta bifascia J. D. Williams, 1975

Synonyms
- Etheostoma bifascia (J.D. Williams, 1975)

= Florida sand darter =

Species of fish

The Florida sand darter (Ammocrypta bifascia) is a species of freshwater ray-finned fish, a darter from the subfamily Etheostomatinae, part of the family Percidae, which also contains the perches, ruffes and pikeperches. It is endemic to Gulf Coast drainages from the Aplalachicola to the Perdido River in Florida and southern Alabama. It inhabits streams with waters that are clear to tannin-stained where there are shifting sand bottoms and a moderate to fast flow. It is most frequently encountered where there is a moderate current in medium-sized to large streams, but it will enter smaller streams on occasion. Its appearance is identical to the naked sand darter aside from two black bands on each dorsal fin. This species can reach a length of 7.1 cm (2.8 in), though most are only about 4.7 cm (1.9 in) in length, at depths of 61 to 122 centimetres (2.00 to 4.00 ft). The Florida sand darter was first formally described in 1975 by James D. Williams with the type locality given as the Choctawhatchee River, 2.4 kilometres (1.5 miles) west of Pittman, Florida. This species forms a clade with the naked sand darter (A. beanii) and the Western sand darter (A. clara).
