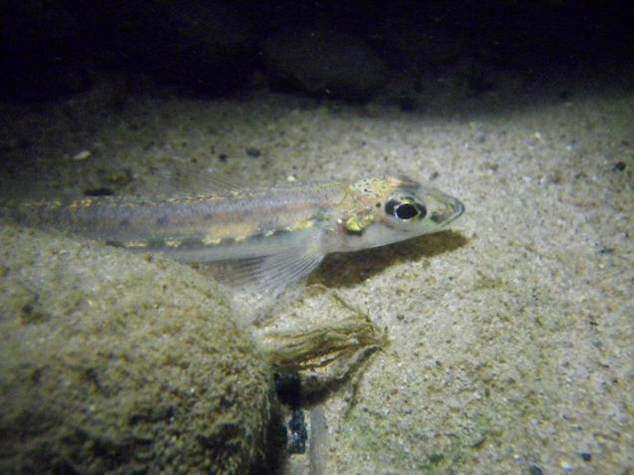
- Diamond darter (Crystallaria cincotta)

Scientific classification
- Kingdom: Animalia
- Phylum: Chordata
- Class: Actinopterygii
- Division: Teleostei
- Order: Perciformes
- Family: Percidae
- Subfamily: Etheostomatinae
- Genus: Crystallaria; D. S. Jordan & C. H. Gilbert, 1885

Type species
- Pleurolepis asprellus D. S. Jordan, 1878

= Crystallaria =

Genus of fishes

Crystallaria is a genus of freshwater ray-finned fish which is classified in the subfamily Etheostomatinae, commonly known as the darters, part of the family Percidae which also includes the perches, ruffes and pikeperches. They are found in the Mississippi River basin from Ohio to Minnesota and in southern Mississippi, northern Louisiana, and southeastern Oklahoma, and on the Gulf Slope of Escambia, Mobile Bay, and the Pearl River drainages. They have now been extirpated from Ohio, Kentucky, Indiana, and Illinois.

== Taxonomy ==
Crystallaria is the sister taxon of the genus Ammocrypta and together these genera are the sister taxon of the clade consisting of the speciose genus Etheostoma and Nothonotus. Some authorities regard Crystallaria as a subgenus of Ammocrypta.

== Species ==
Currently, two species in this genus are recognized:

- Crystallaria asprella D. S. Jordan, 1878 (Crystal darter);
- Crystallaria cincotta S. A. Welsh & R. M. Wood, 2008 (Diamond darter).
