= Southern sand darter =

Conservation status
- Least Concern (IUCN 3.1)

Scientific classification
- Kingdom: Animalia
- Phylum: Chordata
- Class: Actinopterygii
- Order: Perciformes
- Family: Percidae
- Genus: Ammocrypta
- Species: A. meridiana

Binomial name
- Ammocrypta meridiana J. D. Williams, 1975

Synonyms
- Etheostoma meridiana (Williams, 1975)

Species of fish

The southern sand darter (Ammocrypta meridiana) is a species of freshwater ray-finned fish, a darter from the subfamily Etheostomatinae, part of the family Percidae, which also contains the perches, ruffes and pikeperches. It is found in the rivers draining into Mobile Bay in the southeastern United States where it inhabits sandy sections of flowing waters from streams to large rivers.

== Description ==
The Southern sand darter is a close relative of the Eastern sand darter (A. pellucida) and of the scaly sand darter (A. vivax). It can be told apart from the scaly sand darter by the lack of any dark bands on the dorsal, anal or caudal fins, that the blotches along the lateral line are lengthened horizontally and that there are no tubercles on the anal fin when breeding. It is more completely covered in scales than the Eastern sand darter, the tip of its snout is usually coloured. This species can reach a length of 7.1 cm (2.8 in), though most are only about 7 cm (2.8 in) in length.

== Distribution ==
The Southern sand darter is found in the rivers draining into Mobile Bay in Alabama and Mississippi. It occurs throughout the Alabama River system, the Tombigbee River, the Black Warrior River, the Cahaba River and the Tallapoosa River.

== Habitat and biology ==
The southern sand darter occur in moderate to large streams and rivers which have clean sandy beds and a moderate current. They are found in water with depths which range from 15 to 150 centimetres (5.9 to 59.1 in). They appear to spawn from early June up to late July. They feed on invertebrates.

== Taxonomy ==
The Southern sand darter was first formally described in 1975 by the American biologist James D. Williams with the type locality given as Cedar Creek on Alabama State Route 41 near Sardis, Alabama. This species forms a clade within the genus Ammocrypta with the scaly sand darter and the eastern sand darter.
