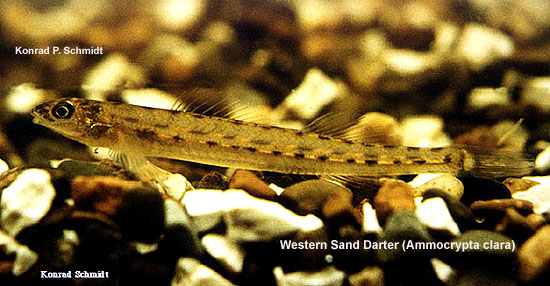

Conservation status
- Vulnerable (IUCN 3.1)

Scientific classification
- Kingdom: Animalia
- Phylum: Chordata
- Class: Actinopterygii
- Order: Perciformes
- Family: Percidae
- Genus: Ammocrypta
- Species: A. clara

Binomial name
- Ammocrypta clara D. S. Jordan & Meek, 1885

Synonyms
- Etheostoma clarum (D. S. Jordan & Meek, 1885)

= Western sand darter =

Species of fish

The western sand darter (Ammocrypta clara) is a species of freshwater ray-finned fish, a darter from the subfamily Etheostomatinae, part of the family Percidae, which also contains the perches, ruffes and pikeperches. It is native to the central United States.

== Distribution ==
The western sand darter occurs in river systems from Lake Michigan to Texas, including several sections of the Mississippi Basin. Its range extends as far east as the Elk River in West Virginia.

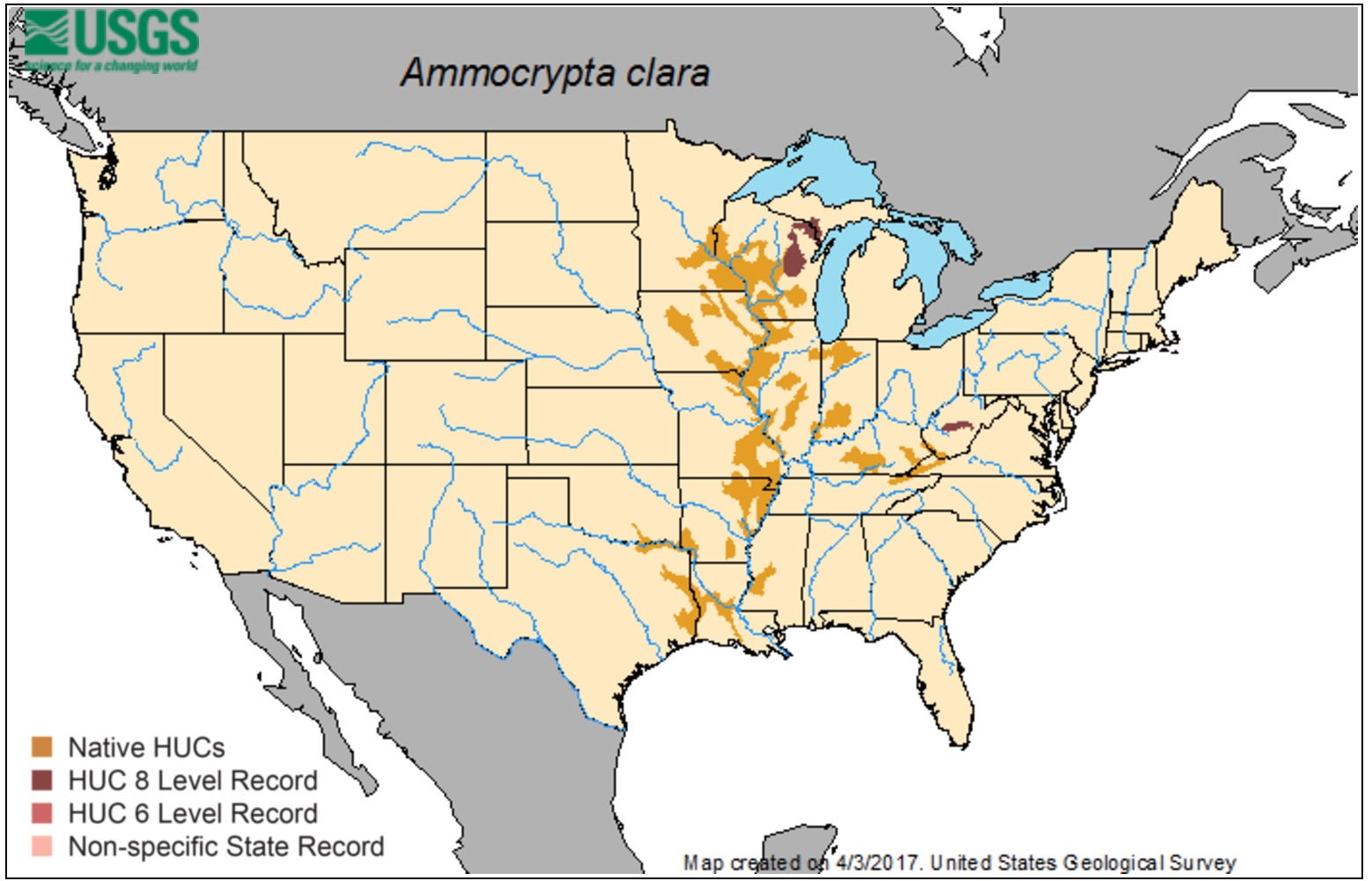
Distribution map

== Description ==
This species is up to 7.1 centimeters in length. It is slender and nearly cylindrical in shape. It is pale, translucent silvery white with yellowish coloration along the back. It is distinguished from other sand darters the lack of dark bands or blotches, and by a spine on its operculum.

== Biology ==
This fish lives in medium and large rivers, over sandy and gravel substrates. It requires loose substrate, because it spends much of its time buried in the sand with just its head protruding. This behavior helps it reach cooler temperatures.

It feeds on invertebrates, especially the larvae of aquatic insects.

It spawns in summer, starting in June in northern regions and May farther south. Females produce an average of 57 eggs at a time, with larger females producing more eggs.

== Taxonomy ==
The Western sand darter was first formally described in 1885 by the American ichthyologists David Starr Jordan (1851–1931) and Seth Eugene Meek (1859–1914) with the type locality given as the Des Moines River at Ottumwa, Iowa. This species forms a clade with the naked sand darter (A. beanii) the Florida sand darter (A. bifascia).

== Conservation ==
This is considered to be a vulnerable species because it has a fragmented distribution and its habitat is degraded in many areas. Increased silt and pollution in river systems reduces the quality of its habitat. The Mississippi River and associated streams and tributaries are heavily channelized and partitioned by locks and dams, eliminating sites where the fish might live.
