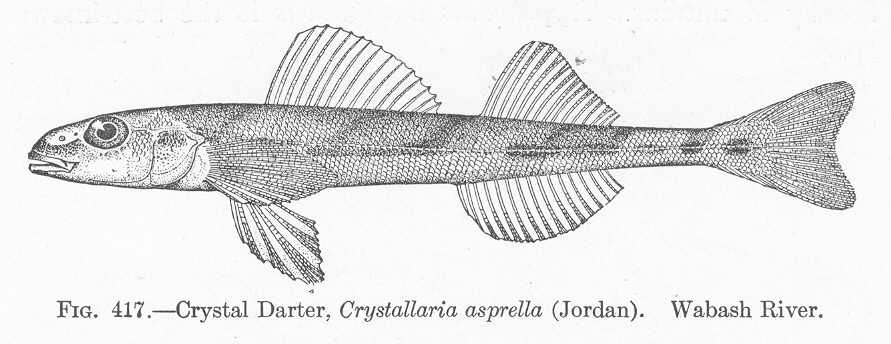

Conservation status
- Vulnerable (IUCN 3.1)

Scientific classification
- Kingdom: Animalia
- Phylum: Chordata
- Class: Actinopterygii
- Division: Teleostei
- Order: Perciformes
- Family: Percidae
- Genus: Crystallaria
- Species: C. asprella

Binomial name
- Crystallaria asprella (D. S. Jordan, 1878)

Synonyms
- Pleurolepis asprellus D. S. Jordan, 1878; Ammocrypta asprella (D. S. Jordan, 1878)

= Crystal darter =

Species of fish

The crystal darter (Crystallaria asprella) is a species of freshwater ray-finned fish, a darter from the subfamily Etheostomatinae, part of the family Percidae, which also contains the perches, ruffes and pikeperches. This small North American fish is found in small, moderate, and swift rivers in the drainage basins of the Mississippi and Ohio Rivers. It is now extirpated from a majority of its range along the Ohio River.

== Appearance ==
A captive specimen

The crystal darter can grow to 12 cm (5 in) in length. It is olive-colored to tan with four dark saddles extending downward to its lateral line, a brownish stripe, and a whitish belly. Its maximum reported age is three years.

== Distribution and habitat ==
The historical range of the crystal darter included the Mississippi River basin, from Wisconsin and Indiana, southwards to southeastern Oklahoma, northern Louisiana, southern Mississippi, the Mobile Basin, Pascagoula, Pearl River, Florida, Alabama, and Mississippi. It is now absent from much of this range and is rare in Wisconsin, Minnesota, Iowa, and Missouri. It is found in swift-flowing streams with clear or slightly turbid water and moderately swift riffles, on small or medium-sized rivers with beds of sand or gravel. It is not found on silty bottoms or areas with vegetation. Individual fish often hide under stones or bury themselves in sand with just their eyes showing.

== Reproductive biology ==
One study focused on the Saline River, Arkansas, suggested that crystal darters spawn multiple times from January through mid-April. Another study, conducted in Alabama, revealed conflicting evidence that suggested the onset of spawning begins in late February and lasts approximately one week in duration. The explanation for such discrepancy in breeding season timing and length is unknown, however, Hubbs (1985) suggested a difference in latitudinal location could explain the variation. Multiple males can copulate with one female at a time. Juvenile crystal darters grow rapidly and reach sexual maturity before age one, but do not spawn until the following season. Most females reach sexual maturity by 50 mm standard length, but males do not mature until they reach 61 mm standard length. Males grow faster and, consequently, adults males are larger than females of the same age. The difference in growth rates and size is probably due to females allocating more of their energy for reproduction. Clutch size ranges from 106 to 576 mature oocytes per female, and clutch size is positively correlated with fish length. The crystal darter is sexually dimorphic and mature males possess longer soft dorsal and anal fins than females.

== Burrowing behavior ==
The crystal darter burrows in sandy substrates with only its eyes protruding. This behavior may have evolved to capture prey, avoid predators, or conserve energy. In 1989, Robert Daniels conducted a study on a closely related species, the eastern sand darter, Ammocrypta pellucida, to explain burying behavior, but rejected both the predator avoidance and prey capturing hypotheses. He suggested that darters burrow in order to save energy while maintaining their position in the sandy substrate where they live. This behavior may be very important during periods of high or low flow, but can be exhibited at any time. Results from Daniels' study may also explain burying behavior in the crystal darter.

== Threats ==
The head of a crystal darter

The crystal darter is susceptible to a number of threats including overexploitation, habitat degradation through pollution and siltation, and habitat modification through stream flow alterations and artificial impoundment.

Small populations of the crystal darter can be affected by scientific or educational collecting. However, collection for research purposes is important in regard to gaining information critical to developing management and conservation strategies to protect the species.

Percid species, such as the crystal darter, require clean gravel and sand substrates for reproduction and foraging for food sources. This habitat requirement makes them sensitive to activities that cause pollution and siltation, such as mining, logging, natural gas exploration and extraction, and agriculture. Because crystal darters are geographically confined to a few freshwater systems with clear, fast-moving water they are particularly vulnerable to extinction when their limited habitat is degraded.

Soil erosion due to intensive or inadequate agricultural and forestry practices and construction activities has amplified the natural effects of siltation in the water bodies that drain these areas. Increased fine sediment deposition in the water column results in increased turbidity and limited light penetration, which can potentially reduce primary productivity with resulting impacts on the rest of the trophic system, including a reduction in habitat for insectivore prey items. High concentrations of fine sediment can also affect fish by reducing their rate of growth, decreasing their tolerance to disease or directly killing them by clogging gill rakers and filaments. Siltation also reduces the suitability of critical spawning habitat, and thus hinders the stability and growth of future populations. Siltation is particularly threatening to the crystal darter, because it relies on clean sand and gravel habitats to reproduce. In addition, natural fish migration patterns can be modified when certain areas of this route become uninhabitable. Finally, siltation negatively affects the efficiency of hunting in visual feeders, such as the crystal darter.

Stream flow modification through channelization and dredging can also affect darter populations. These processes can alter hydrologic regimes by reducing flow velocity through the straightening and widening of channels. Since the crystal darter prefers strong currents, converting fast moving streams into slower moving channels or pools through these modifications can reduce the amount of available habitat to the crystal darter. In addition to altering flow, these modifications also reduce habitat diversity.

Artificial impoundments, such as dams, increase the amount of sedimentation in streams by drowning riffles and reducing flow, causing changes in substrate composition. In addition to increasing the effects of siltation, impoundments fragment fish habitat. Fragmentation can affect immigration and emigration between populations, inhibiting connectivity and gene flow. Isolated populations become increasingly susceptible to environmental disturbances, and if these populations were extirpated new fishes would be unable to recolonize and counter these local extinctions. Isolation to reduced ranges due to habitat fragmentation can also inhibit gene dispersal, consequently limiting genetic diversity which can lead to reduced fitness of populations.

== Conservation ==
The crystal darter is listed as vulnerable by the IUCN on its Red List because of "a decline in area of occupancy, extent of occurrence and/or quality of habitat". It is also listed as a special concern species by the Minnesota Department of Natural Resources and the Arkansas Game and Fish Commission, as an endangered species by the Wisconsin Department of Natural Resources and the Missouri Department of Conservation, as an extirpated species by the Illinois Department of Natural Resources, and as a tier 1, or critically impaired, species by the Mississippi Department of Wildlife, Fisheries and Parks because of "extreme rarity (five or fewer occurrences or very few remaining individuals or acres) or because of some factor(s) making it vulnerable to extirpation."

== Taxonomy ==
The crystal darter was first formally described as Pleurolepis asprellus by the American ichthyologist David Starr Jordan (1851–1931) with the type locality given as a small rocky tributary of the Mississippi River at Warsaw, Illinois. When Jordan and his colleague, Charles Henry Gilbert (1859–1928) subsequently assigned Pleurolepis asprellus to the new genus Crystallaria in 1885 P. asprellus was its type species by monotypy.
