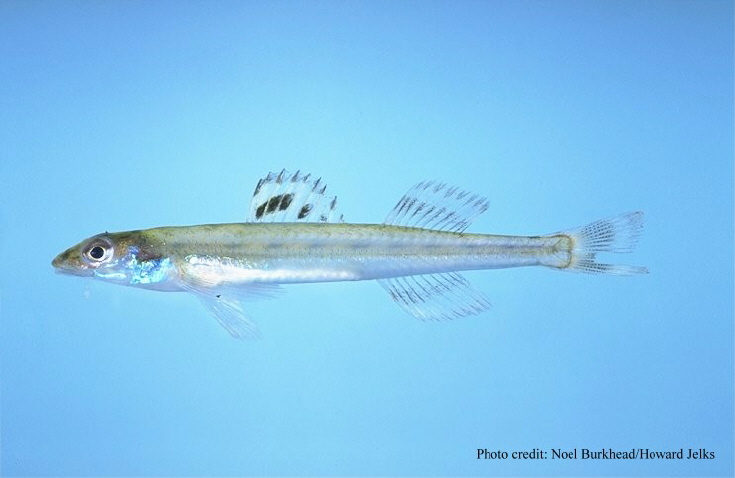
- Florida sand darter, (A. bifascia)

Scientific classification
- Kingdom: Animalia
- Phylum: Chordata
- Class: Actinopterygii
- Order: Perciformes
- Family: Percidae
- Subfamily: Etheostomatinae
- Genus: Ammocrypta; D. S. Jordan, 1877

Type species
- Ammocrypta beanii D. S. Jordan, 1877

Synonyms
- Pleurolepis Putnam, 1863; Vigil D. S. Jordan, 1919

= Ammocrypta =

Genus of fishes

Ammocrypta is a genus of freshwater ray-finned fish, commonly known as the sand darters, which is classified in the subfamily Etheostomatinae, part of the family Percidae which also includes the perches, ruffes and pikeperches. The species in the genus occur in eastern North America in Canada and the continental United States.

== Characteristics ==
Ammocrypta species are characterised by having rather elongate and slender bodies. Their bodies are translucent and there is only a single spine in the anal fin. They also have Spreitzer vertebrae, that is that the first three vertebrae of the backbone, counting from the head, have an open haemal arch which allows for the fish's kidney to expand. They have the habit of burying into the sand or gravel bed of streams, only their eyes being visible. The translucence of their bodies and their habit of burying themselves gives them some protection against predation.

The shared morphological characteristics of Ammocrypta with its sister taxon Crystallaria include the possession of complete lateral lines and unbroken canal on the head. They also share high meristic counts which are thought to be indications of basal morphology, referred to as plesiomorphies.

== Distribution ==
Ammocrypta is found in eastern North America where they are found across the central part of the coastal plain of the Gulf of Mexico, the whole of the drainage basin of the Mississippi River and of the Ohio River, the Lake St Clair system as well as the lower drainage basins of Lake Huron and Lake Superior.

== Species ==
The currently recognized species in this genus are:

- Ammocrypta beanii D. S. Jordan, 1877 (Naked sand darter)
- Ammocrypta bifascia J. D. Williams, 1975 (Florida sand darter)
- Ammocrypta clara D. S. Jordan & Meek, 1885 (Western sand darter)
- Ammocrypta meridiana J. D. Williams, 1975 (Southern sand darter)
- Ammocrypta pellucida Putnam, 1863 (Eastern sand darter)
- Ammocrypta vivax O. P. Hay, 1882 (Scaly sand darter)

== Taxonomy ==
Ammocrypta is the sister taxon of the genus Crystallaria and together these genera are the sister taxon of the clade consisting of the speciose genus Etheostoma and Nothonotus. Some authorities regard Crystallaria as a subgenus of Ammocrypta.
