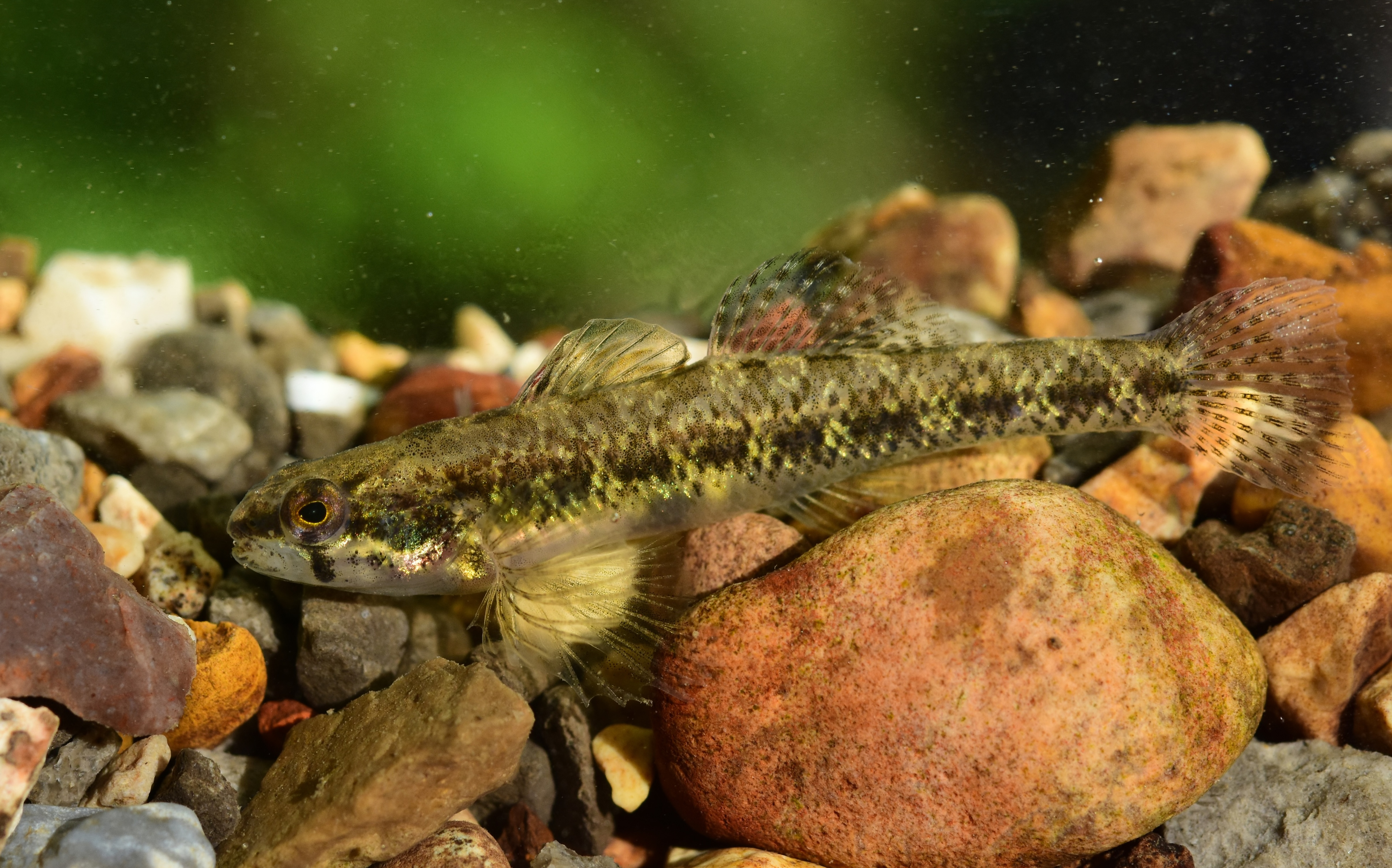

Conservation status
- Least Concern (IUCN 3.1)

Scientific classification
- Kingdom: Animalia
- Phylum: Chordata
- Class: Actinopterygii
- Order: Perciformes
- Family: Percidae
- Genus: Etheostoma
- Species: E. proeliare

Binomial name
- Etheostoma proeliare (O. P. Hay, 1881)

Synonyms
- Microperca proeliaris O. P. Hay, 1881

= Cypress darter =

Species of fish

The cypress darter (Etheostoma proeliare) is a species of freshwater ray-finned fish, a darter from the subfamily Etheostomatinae, part of the family Percidae, which also contains the perches, ruffes and pikeperches. It is endemic to fresh waters of the central and eastern United States. Its range includes drainages from the Choctawhatchee River, Florida, to the San Jacinto River, Texas, as well as the Mississippi River basin from southern Illinois and eastern Oklahoma to the Gulf of Mexico. It inhabits vegetated margins of swamps and lakes, and backwater habitats during the summer, while in winter it moves to flooded riffles and backwater bayous. It feeds mostly on small crustaceans, as well as insects and their larvae. Spawning takes place during spring and summer, with clusters of up to three eggs being laid, often stuck to the surface of dead leaves. The cypress darter has a very wide range and its population trend seems to be stable. It is a common species with numerous sub-populations, and the International Union for Conservation of Nature has assessed its conservation status as being of "least concern".

== Distribution ==
The cypress darter can be found across the Gulf Coastal plain of southern North America, in regions from the Colorado River of eastern Texas through the Choctawhatchee River of eastern Alabama, north to the Fall Line, and upstream along the Arkansas River valley in eastern Oklahoma. They prefer living in vegetated margins of swamps and lakes and slow-moving streams with silt or sand bottoms and leaf-laden water. It inhabits backwater habitats during the summer; in winter, flooded riffles and backwater bayous, and lowland lakes are ideal microhabitats for the cypress darter. For example, in Texas, it can be found in streams limited to the extreme east, including the Red River, Sabine Lake, Galveston Bay, and the Colorado River. No current information points to the decrease in any population of the cypress darter across the southeast.

== Ecology ==
The diet of the cypress darter includes many food sources; it feeds more heavily on small crustaceans and less heavily on insects other than chironomids, probably a function of its small body and mouth, which makes ingestion of large insects (e.g., caddisflies and stoneflies) difficult, and the habitat where it lives. Since the cypress darter lives in slow-moving, leaf-laden, shallow water, crustaceans will be more common and are a viable food source. Insects such as stoneflies prefer faster-moving water with rocky substrates, so are not often found in the cypress darters' habitats. E. proeliare will also feed on midge larvae, isopods, amphipods, and may fly nymphs. Concerning the cypress darter's leaf laden habitat and slow moving water, the pH of the water it lives in will be lower due to the process of decomposition of the leaves and vegetation present, and the water temperature will be warmer from the natural insulation caused by the vegetation and lack of fast-moving water which carries the heat out. In addition to the cypress darter's habitat, the interactions with its community are quite competitive and dangerous. For example, in Max Creek, Illinois, the competition observed with E. proeliare was with E. chlorosomum and E. gracile. Apparently, these three species all lay their eggs on vegetation and are found in the same swampy, silt- or sand-bottom, leaf-laden waters. Some of the fish that prey on the cypress darter include Micropterus salmoides, Lepomis megalotis, Centrarchus macropterus, and Cottus caroline. Humans may hinder E. proeliare's abundance by polluting its habitat with toxic runoff from paved roads and silt from logging causing erosion around streams.

== Lifecycle ==
The cypress darter's reproductive interval has been reported to be active from early January through mid-April across the southeastern US. Eggs are laid by the female most commonly on dead leaves, with the male attached behind her to release his sperm onto them once laid. Eggs are laid 15–20 cm apart in groups of one to three. As many as 45 eggs have been counted on one leaf. The male does not guard the eggs. The exact number of times the cypress darter will reproduce per season is unknown, but the females have been known to mate with more than one male if the population count in the area is high. The eggs of the cypress darter have an indentation in them when first laid. The indentation disappears during the interval from fertilization to early cleavage. This is believed to be caused by "water hardening, which is changes in the characteristics of the egg plasma membrane, with resultant redistribution of ions and water across the membrane". Once the egg hatches, the cypress darter requires a year to reach its sexual maturity. Human-induced water pollution affects the lifecycle of the cypress darter significantly, by degrading the waters where it reproduces. For example, without using the proper methods of a clean logging operation, slow-moving streams where E. proeliare spawns can be choked with mud, silt, and harmful debris from erosion and logging road runoffs. With a silt-choked stream, the eggs will not be able to breathe, and this can kill them along with their parents.

== Management ==
Currently, the cypress darter is not listed as threatened or federally endangered by Texas Parks and Wildlife Department, and the population is known as secured throughout the southern United States. Since so little is known about E. proeliare, besides the fact they are prospering in the south, no known management practices are specifically being used on the cypress darter. Best management practices (BMPs) are practical, effective, methods which prevent the movement of nutrients, sediments, and other pollutants from the land to surface or ground water. BMPs protect water quality from potential adverse effects of silvicultural activities such as forest management, construction of roads, log landings, and skid trails. Most all the erosion when dealing with forestry operations occurs from poor road construction and logging practices. When topsoil is disturbed, torn apart, or compacted, the natural filtering action the soil provides is reduced, along with surface water absorption. Harvesting trees, however, does not cause erosion, since the roots support the soil and keep it in place. The soil may be disturbed and begin erosion if the tree is hauled out in a destructive or unprofessional way.

Recommendations for managing the cypress darter would be to use BMPs and streamside management zones in areas where known populations of the species exist.
