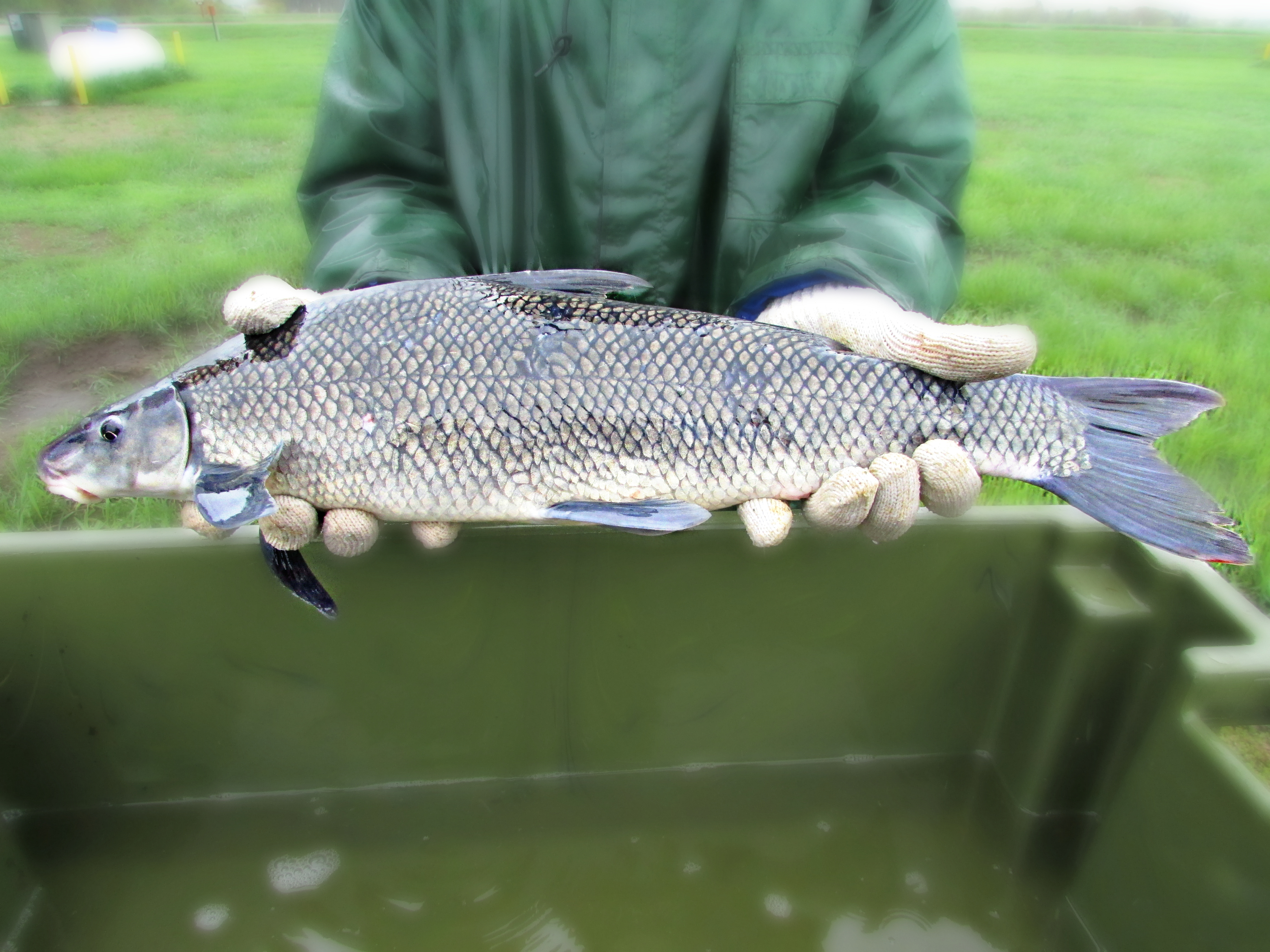
- Cycleptus elongatus

Scientific classification
- Domain: Eukaryota
- Kingdom: Animalia
- Phylum: Chordata
- Class: Actinopterygii
- Order: Cypriniformes
- Family: Catostomidae
- Subfamily: Cycleptinae; Gill, 1861
- Genus: Cycleptus; Rafinesque, 1819

Type species
- Cycleptus nigrescens Rafinesque, 1819

= Cycleptus =

Genus of fishes

Cycleptus is a genus of freshwater fish containing two relatively large North American species of suckers. They are endemic to river basins draining into the Gulf of Mexico, including the Mississippi, Rio Grande and others in the United States and Mexico.

== Species ==
- Cycleptus elongatus (Lesueur, 1817) (Blue sucker)
- Cycleptus meridionalis Burr & Mayden, 1999 (Southeastern blue sucker)
