= Watersheds of Indiana =

The Watersheds of Indiana consist of six distinct Indiana watershed regions that drain into five major bodies of water.

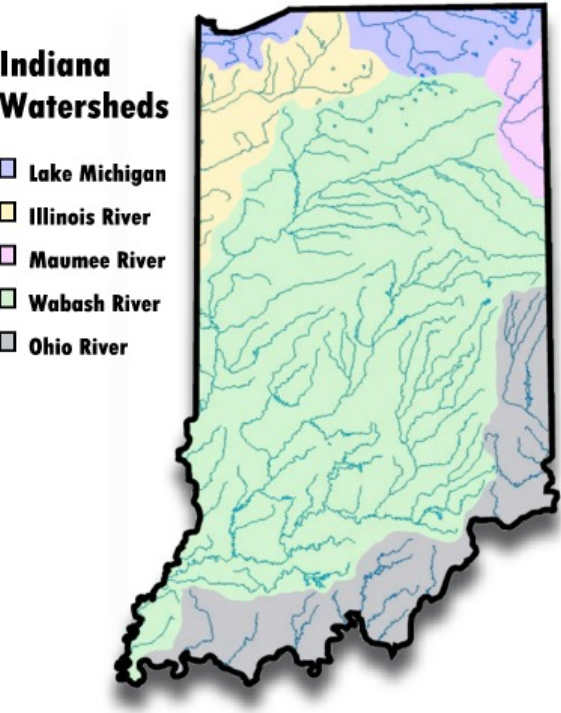
In the above map, The largest area, shaded in green, drains into the Wabash River. Of the other watersheds, the blue areas drain into Lake Michigan, the yellow area drains into the Illinois River, the pink area drains into the Maumee River, the gray area drains into the Ohio River.

== Illinois River watershed ==
With the Kankakee River, the Illinois River watershed stretches from the Illinois border in northwest Indiana and up into Michigan's Berrien County, adjacent to St. Joseph County.

This drainage area include most of the state known as the Northwest Indiana, including the city of La Porte but excluding the area north of the Valparaiso Moraine which drains into Lake Michigan.

== Lake Michigan watersheds ==
There are two watersheds in the state that drain into Lake Michigan. In the northwest part of the state, it includes the Grand Calumet River area in Lake and Porter counties, and includes the cities of Gary and Hammond. This watershed is defined by the Valparaiso Moraine.

The second, and larger Lake Michigan watershed is the St. Joseph River watershed, which drains the north central and northeastern part of the state. It includes the cities of South Bend, Elkhart, Mishawaka and Goshen.

== Maumee River watershed ==
The smallest watershed in the state is the Maumee River watershed in the northeast part of the state on the border with Ohio. It includes most of the city of Fort Wayne as well as the cities of New Haven, Woodburn, and Auburn. The Maumee eventually empties into Lake Erie at Toledo, Ohio.

== Ohio River watershed ==
The Ohio River watershed includes the extreme southern part of the state as well as the extreme southwestern Indiana counties. This drainage area includes the cities of Evansville, Richmond and New Albany as well as the Indiana suburbs of Cincinnati, Ohio.

== Wabash River watershed ==
By far the largest watershed in the state, the Wabash River drainage area contains the several large cities, including Indianapolis and the extreme western part of Fort Wayne. Other cities included in the area are Bloomington, Muncie, Lafayette, Anderson and Terre Haute. This watershed also includes most of Indiana's prime farm land. The area within the Lower Wabash Valley is also known as "Watermelon Country", largely due to its sandy soil on which watermelons and cantaloupes thrive. Cities within this area include Vincennes, Sullivan. Many towns of this area have "Watermelon Festivals" such as Owensville, Poseyville and Vincennes (Knox County) usually at harvest time (first weeks of August).

== See also ==
- Valparaiso Moraine
