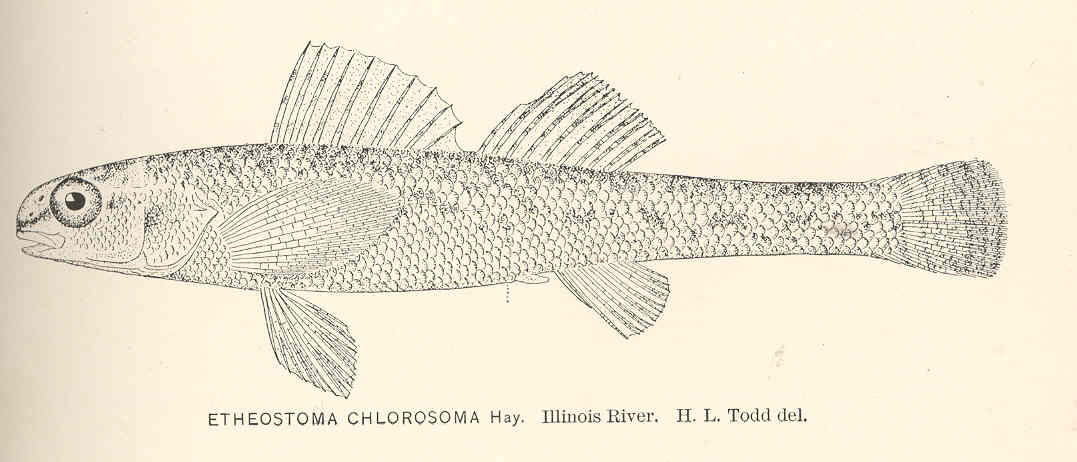

Conservation status
- Least Concern (IUCN 3.1)

Scientific classification
- Kingdom: Animalia
- Phylum: Chordata
- Class: Actinopterygii
- Order: Perciformes
- Family: Percidae
- Genus: Etheostoma
- Species: E. chlorosoma

Binomial name
- Etheostoma chlorosoma (O. P. Hay, 1881)

Synonyms
- Boleosoma camurum Forbes in Jordan, 1878; Vaillantia chlorosoma O. P. Hay, 1881; Etheostoma chlorosomum (Hay, 1881); Etheostoma chlorosomus (Hay, 1881)

= Bluntnose darter =

Species of fish

The bluntnose darter (Etheostoma chlorosoma) is a species of freshwater ray-finned fish, a darter from the subfamily Etheostomatinae, part of the family Percidae, which also contains the perches, ruffes and pikeperches. It is found in eastern North America where it is found in slower moving and still waters.

== Taxonomy and etymology ==
The bluntnose darter was first formally described by the American Oliver Perry Hay (1846–1930) with the type locality given as the Cullasaja River at Macon County, North Carolina. The generic name Etheostoma derives from Greek etheo, "to strain", and stoma, "mouth". The specific name chlorosoma is Greek for "greenish-yellow".

== Description ==
Bluntnose darters attain a size of up to 2 inches (5.1 cm). the species has a diagnostic very round, blunt snout. Its color is light yellow or olive dorsally with either dark brown or black spots or uneven dense lines. The belly is white. The flanks bear W-shaped marks . The area in front of the eyes consists of continuous black bars around the snout. This barring also slightly extends onto the upper lip. The dorsal and caudal fins have some pigment in light brown bands, while the other fins are clear. There is a single anal spine. The opercle, cheek, and prepectoral area are scaled, while the breast may be fully or partially scaled. Scales may be embedded. The belly is either fully scaled or scaled posteriorly and unscaled anteriorly. Bluntnose darters have an incomplete lateral line.

During breeding, males take on a darker or dusky breeding coloration, induced by melanophores unevenly distributed throughout the fins, and on the underside of the body. Breeding tubercles develop on the pelvic and anal fins. Females develop a large, spatulate genital papillae.

== Distribution and habitat ==
The species occurs in North America from the San Antonio Bay drainage in Texas east to Mississippi, Alabama and Indiana, and north to Minnesota. It was formerly present in the Lake Michigan drainage area. In Louisiana, the bluntnose darter is one of the most widely distributed darters and is found in all river drainages, but it is absent in the southernmost estuarine environments. The species is found in swamps, floodplain lakes, sloughs, and low-gradient creeks, often over substrates of mud, clay or detritus. It can be found in large rivers, where it most often occupies backwaters.

== Diet ==
In specimens found in Tennessee, the bluntnose darter's diet was made up of aquatic insects such as caddisfly larvae, dytiscid beetles, and midge larvae.

== Reproduction and life cycle ==
The lifespan of the bluntnose darter is likely about three years. Spawning occurs at different times of year throughout the range; in Texas, a spawning period from early January to late March has been observed, April in Kansas, and March and April in Louisiana. Males court females in displays that include of posing while quivering with upright fins. The spawning site is chosen by the female. She usually selects algae, dead leaves, or a small twig. Males mount the females for fertilization, only fertilizing 1–3 eggs per attempt. Larval development of the bluntnose darter has not yet been described.
