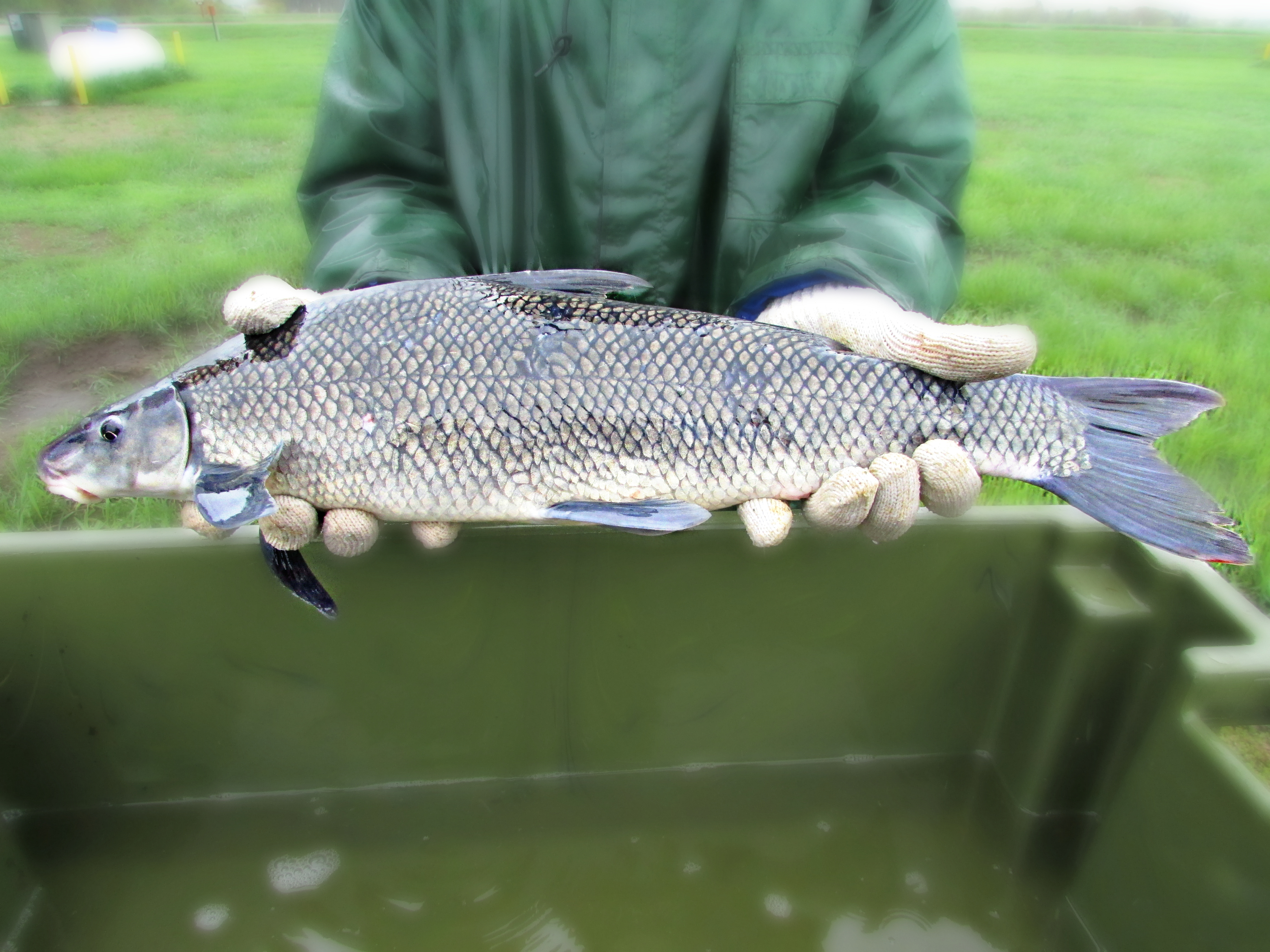

Conservation status
- Least Concern (IUCN 3.1)

- Vulnerable (NatureServe)

Scientific classification
- Kingdom: Animalia
- Phylum: Chordata
- Class: Actinopterygii
- Division: Teleostei
- Order: Cypriniformes
- Family: Catostomidae
- Genus: Cycleptus
- Species: C. elongatus

Binomial name
- Cycleptus elongatus Lesueur, 1817

Synonyms
- Catostomus elongatus Lesueur, 1817; Cycleptus nigrescens Rafinesque, 1819; Rhytidostomus elongatus (Lesueur, 1871

= Blue sucker =

Species of fish

The blue sucker (Cycleptus elongatus) is a long-lived freshwater species of fish in the sucker family that is of conservation concern. The species has an average weight of 2–3 kilograms (4.4–6.6 lb) and an average length of 76 centimetres (30 in). The record length has been recorded at 84 centimetres (33 in), and individuals have been documented beyond 130 years of age.

== Description ==
Color is variable, from light steel-gray to almost jet black in the spring. The fish is streamlined, with an inferior mouth and a small/slender head that tapers to a fleshy snout. The mouth location allows the fish to feed off the bottom of its habitat. The body of this fish is elongated and slightly compressed. It has a long falcate dorsal fin which is elevated anterior with 24–35 rays. It has a long caudal peduncle and a forked caudal fin. The anal fin contains 7–8 rays on average. The scales are large and contain 55–58 along the lateral line.

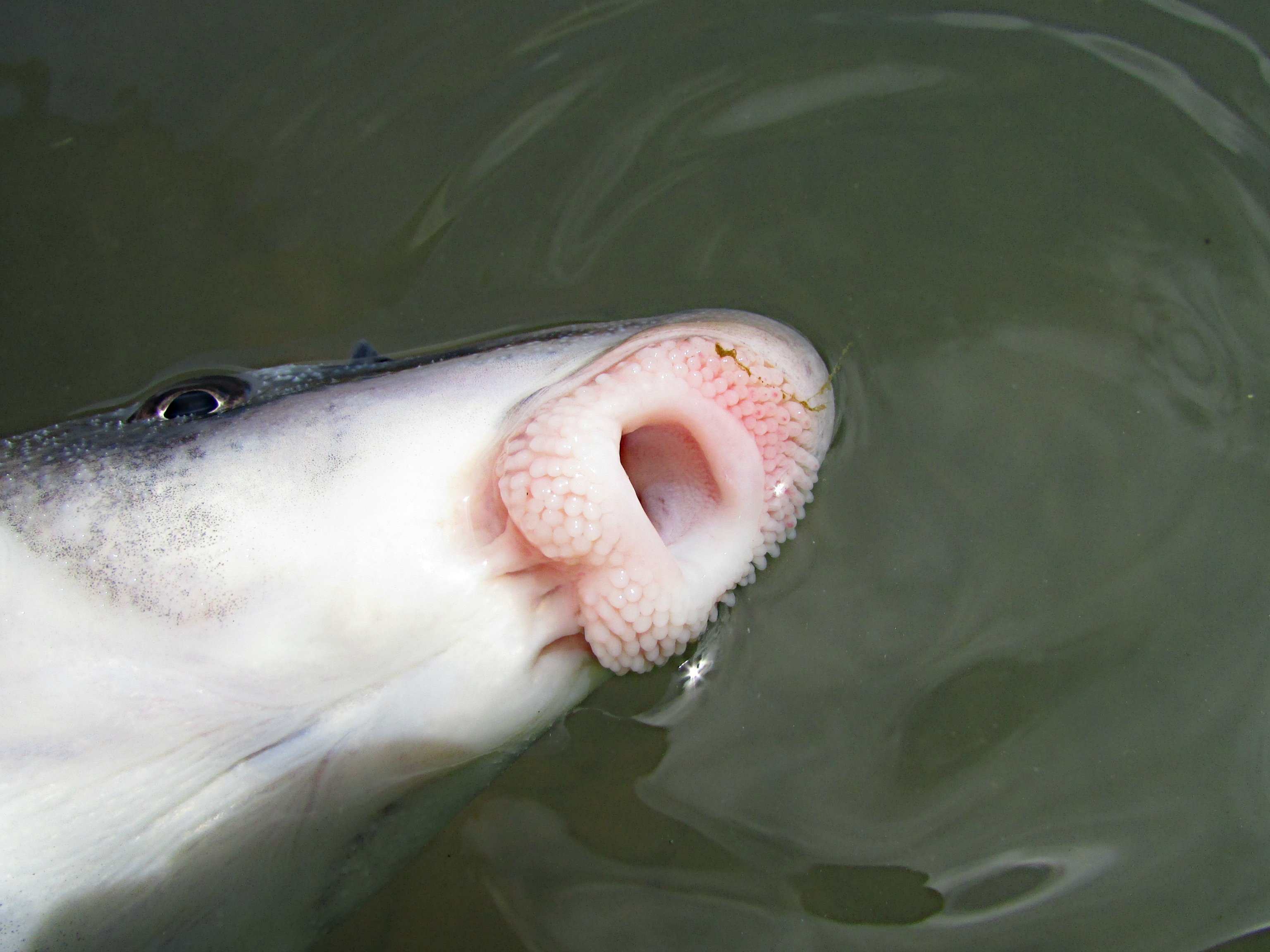
Inferiorly positioned sucker mouth

== Range and distribution ==
The blue sucker is native to the United States and Mexico. In the U.S., it lives in the Mississippi River basin north to Minnesota and Wisconsin. The Blue Sucker also lives in the Missouri River drainage to North Dakota and South Dakota and Montana. This species can also be found in the Gulf drainage from the Sabine River to the Rio Grande.

== Habitat ==
Huge migrations of these fast, powerful fish once migrated throughout the Mississippi River basin, and spring harvests of blue sucker were a staple food for early pioneers. Blue suckers are very rare today, thought to be due to the segmentation of habitat caused by the thousands of dams which have been built in the last century. Blues frequent the thalweg of large river systems, in heavy current.

== Diet ==
Blue suckers obtain their food off the bottom of rivers and other bodies of freshwater through a mouth in the inferior position. Some organisms that they eat are aquatic insect larvae, crustaceans, plant materials and algae.

== Reproduction ==
The blue sucker has a spawning time from around March until June. This varies on the location of the fish and also the water temperature. Fifty-three degrees (11.7°C) is the average water temperature in which males and females find their spawning area. This area is in fast moving water around two feet deep. Rocks in the area will also be larger than gravel, but they will be smaller than boulders. The peak water temperature is sixty-two degrees and the actual spawning time will usually last around two weeks. Male suckers will continue to come to the area until spawning is officially over. Females will go to the area, lay her eggs, and leave once she is finished and they have been fertilized. Recent evidence indicates their recruitment patterns are episodic, and their life history is longer-lived than previously realized.

== Conservation ==
The blue sucker is sensitive to water pollution, and is only able to live in water that is well irrigated and unpolluted. This is why it is common to see them in rivers. The species is imperiled in numerous US states, and its conservation status in other states is likely in need of revision.

== Trivia ==
The blue sucker also goes by the name blackhorse, the bluefish, the razor back, the sockerel, the gourd seed sucker, the Missouri Sucker, the slenderhead sucker, and the sweet sucker.

== Etymology ==
"Cycleptus" is a Greek word meaning circular or slender. "Elongatus" is a Latin word meaning elongated.
