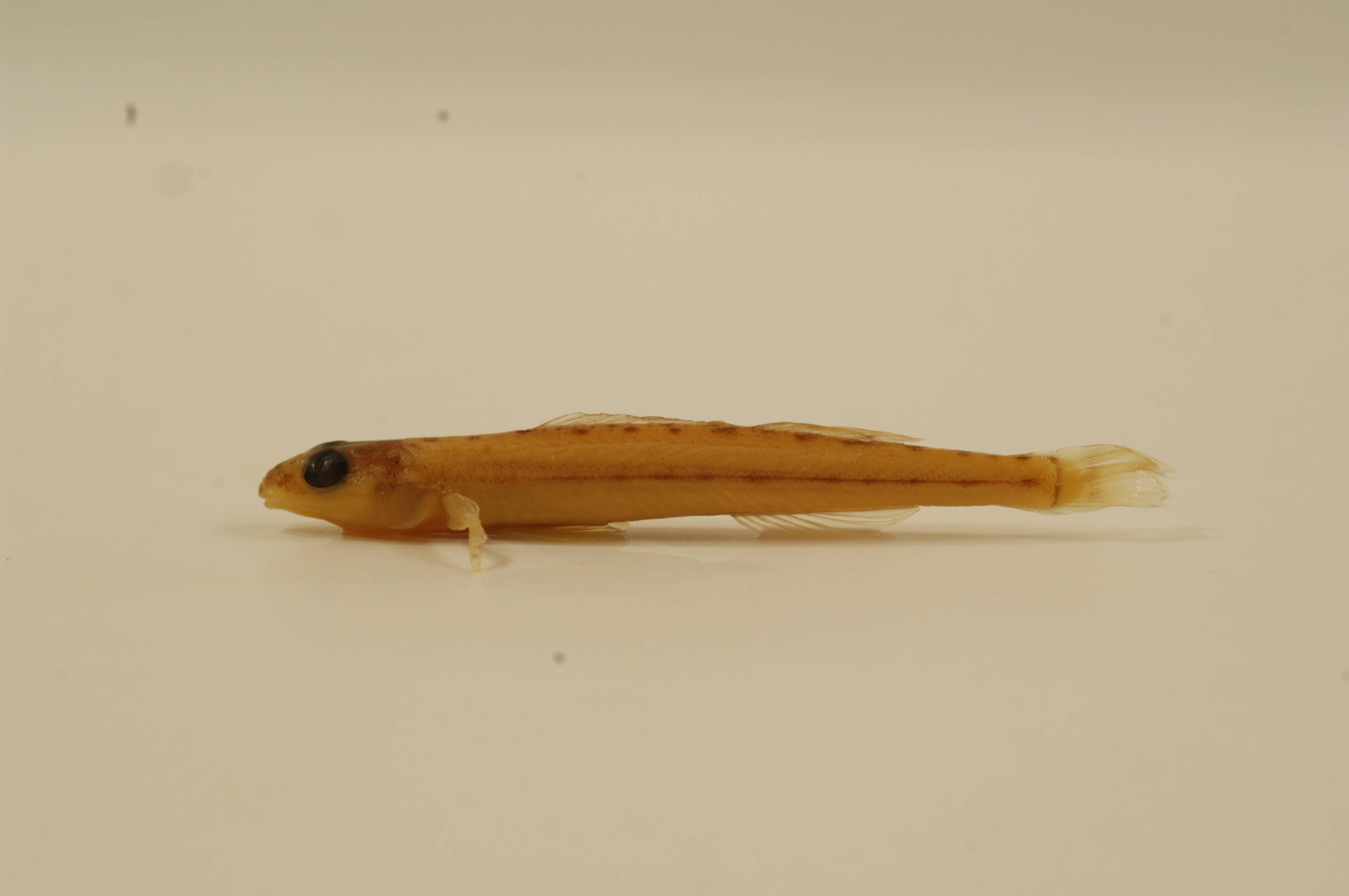

Conservation status
- Least Concern (IUCN 3.1)

Scientific classification
- Kingdom: Animalia
- Phylum: Chordata
- Class: Actinopterygii
- Order: Perciformes
- Family: Percidae
- Genus: Ammocrypta
- Species: A. pellucida

Binomial name
- Ammocrypta pellucida (Putnam, 1863)

Synonyms
- Pleurolepis pellucidus Putnam, 1863; Etheostoma pellucidum (Putnam, 1863)

= Eastern sand darter =

Species of fish

The eastern sand darter (Ammocrypta pellucida) is a species of freshwater ray-finned fish, a darter from the subfamily Etheostomatinae, part of the family Percidae, which also contains the perches, ruffes and pikeperches. The eastern sand darter is a relatively small fish, most plentiful in the Mississippi and Ohio Rivers, as well as Lake Champlain and the Great Lakes. It prefers sandy-bottomed streams and sandy shoals in the lakes. The eastern sand darter feeds on larvae of black flies and other small insects in the water. They also feed on zooplankton in small portions since their small mouth size limits their gape ability. Its average body size is around 1.5-2 in long, and it breeds in the spring and summer in sandy-bottomed waters.

== Description ==
The average lifespan for the eastern sand darter is about 2–3 years, but if the siltation and pollution continue to worsen, the lifespan will gradually decrease.

A. pellucida reproduces in the sandy shoals at the bottom of the lakes and rivers it inhabits during the spring and summer when the water is at its warmest temperature. It reaches sexual maturity around age one and the males are able to mate once during the breeding season, while females mate twice, producing about 350 eggs with an average clutch size of 71 eggs. If siltation continues to worsen, many of the eggs will be smothered, resulting in reduced reproduction, further hindering the eastern sand darters' population count.

== Distribution and habitat ==
The eastern sand darter can be found in many areas throughout the United States and into southern Canada. In addition to the Mississippi and Ohio Rivers, it can be found in great concentration in Lakes Champlain, Erie, Huron, Michigan and Ontario. They can also be found in the St. Lawrence River drainage in Canada along with the Lake Champlain drainage in Vermont south into New York, Pennsylvania, West Virginia, Kentucky, Illinois, and Indiana. Currently, the greatest concentration occurs in northern Alabama and eastern Tennessee.

Distribution has slowly decreased over the last few decades, and two key factors could be the cause. The eastern sand darter requires clean sand substrates; hence, siltation is a major factor in their decline. Siltation decreases the quality of habitat for both egg development and adult darters by decreasing the oxygen levels within the sand in which they bury themselves. Furthermore, silted habitats can cause adult darters to not fully burrow or decrease their time burrowed which then causes them to waste energy reserves. Channel or water flow alterations, nutrient enrichment, or any other habitat modification can completely change the amount and quality of the shifting sand bars which can then turn detrimental for the eastern sand darter. The increased construction of dams also has been a major factor contributing to the reduction of their habitats. Dams reduce river levels and flow, decrease oxygen levels in reservoir waters, and alter water temperatures, making it difficult for the eastern sand darter to reproduce at a comfortable temperature. Dam construction adds a whole new dimension to decreasing the reproduction and survival rate for A. pellucida.

== Feeding ==
This fish seeks its prey from the sand along the bottom of the stream or lake. Their prey items usually range in size up to 3/16 inches, but prey selection varies depending on the age of the darter. Juvenile eastern sand darters consume small crustaceans, while adults prefer midge larvae, blackfly larvae, mayflies, and caddisflies. It has several species of fish predators, including rainbow trout, largemouth and smallmouth bass, and rock bass. However, since it spends extensive time buried in the sand and it has a translucent body, the eastern sand darter usually tends to be protected from predators. Minnows are the eastern sand darters' biggest competitor for food, but little conflict arises between the two since the darter occupies the lowest depths of the rivers and lakes while the minnows occupy the upper water column.

== Taxonomy ==
The Eastern sand darter was first formally described as Pleurolepsis pellucidus in 1863 by the American ichthyologist Frederic Ward Putnam (1839–1915) with the type locality given as the Black River at Elyria, Ohio. This species forms a clade with the scaly sand darter (A. vivax) and the Southern sand darter (A. meridiana).
