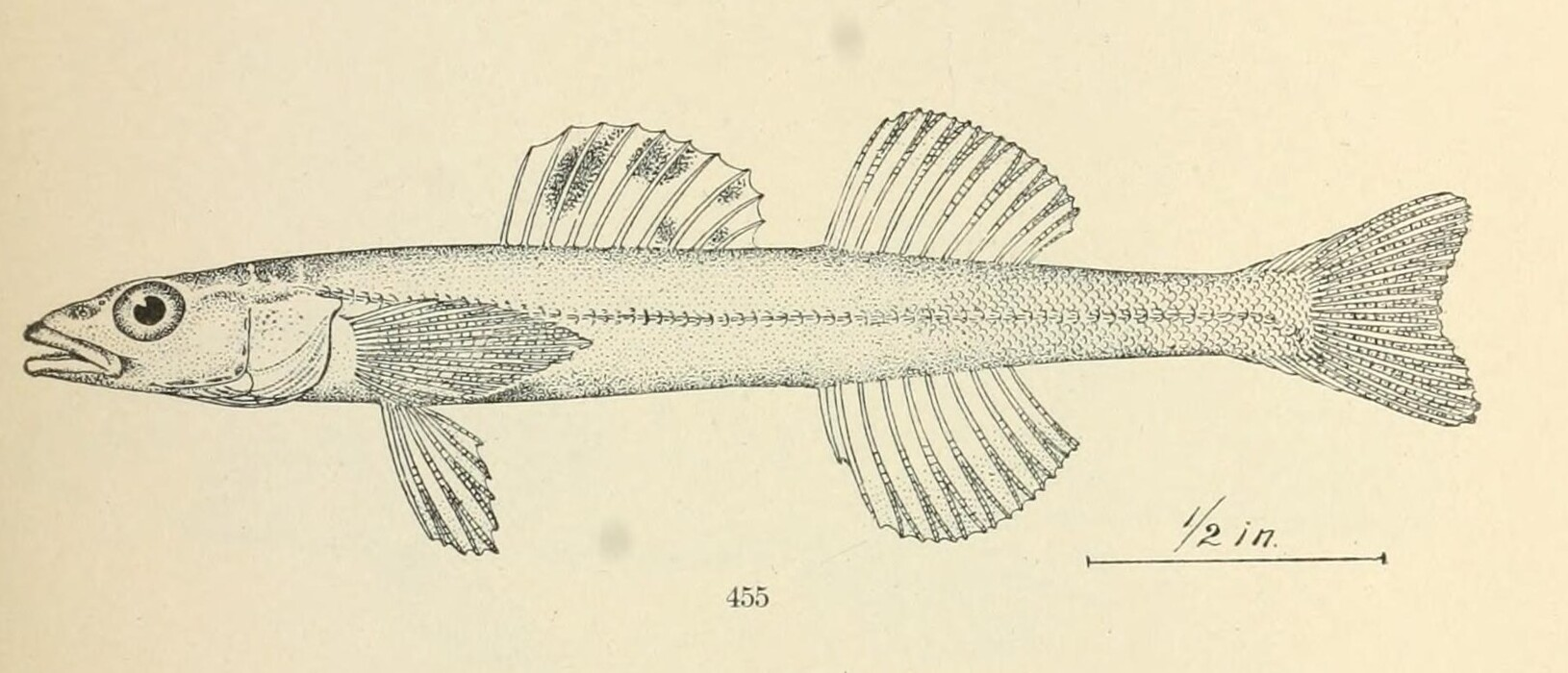

Conservation status
- Least Concern (IUCN 3.1)

Scientific classification
- Kingdom: Animalia
- Phylum: Chordata
- Class: Actinopterygii
- Order: Perciformes
- Family: Percidae
- Genus: Ammocrypta
- Species: A. beanii

Binomial name
- Ammocrypta beanii D. S. Jordan, 1877

= Naked sand darter =

Species of fish

The naked sand darter (Ammocrypta beanii) is a species of freshwater ray-finned fish, a darter from the subfamily Etheostomatinae, part of the family Percidae, which also contains the perches, ruffes and pikeperches. It is found in the south-eastern United States.

== Description ==
The naked sand darter is a small fish ranging in size from 40 to 50 mm (1.6 to 2.0 in) long, the maximum being around 64 mm (2.5 in) standard length. Being a long thin darter, it is devoid of scales with the exception of a few rows above and below the lateral line and sometimes the caudal peduncle. Slightly transparent in life with a yellow color and iridescent operculum, the naked sand darter blends in with its habitat. It has darker bands in the dorsal, anal, and caudal fins with a whitish base and tip. Males of breeding size have a dark spot at the front of the first dorsal fin. Unlike similar darters, it does not have an opercular spine.

== Diet ==
Larvae of small fish are the primary source of food for naked sand darters. They also feed on clam larvae or smaller crustaceans like copepods depending on their size. Naked sand darters feed continuously throughout the day, but stop at night. They also feed less in winter and summer months then pick back up before and after breeding season.

== Habitat ==
Naked sand darters prefer the sandy bottoms of clean, freshwater rivers and streams. They can be found about 1 m deep on the bottom, digging into the sand to wait for prey to swim by.

== Distribution ==
They can be found exclusively along the Gulf of Mexico in the rivers and drainages of eastern Louisiana to as far east as the Mobile Bay drainage in Alabama. Naked sand darters have been found as far north as West Tennessee.

== Reproduction and lifecycle ==
Breeding season is from March or April until September or October when water temperatures are between 17 and 29 °C (63 and 84 °F). Males develop tubercles on their anal and pelvic fins to aid in fighting for females. Females can produce from 12–122 eggs at a time and reach sexual maturity after a year. They only live 24 to 30 months.

== Taxonomy and etymology ==
The naked sand darter was first formally described in 1877 by the American ichthyologist David Starr Jordan (1851–1931) with the type locality given as the Natalbany River, near Tickfaw, Louisiana. It is the type species of the genus Ammocrypta, which Jordan also originally described. The genus name, Ammocrypta, comes from the Greek word ammos meaning sand and the Greek kryptos meaning hidden. The specific name, beanii, comes from the first collector of the species, Tarleton H. Bean (1846–1915).
