= Rough fish =

Fish considered less desirable to some anglers

Rough fish (or the slang trash fish or dirt fish) is a term used by some United States state agencies and anglers to describe fish that are less desirable to sport anglers within a defined region. The term usually refers to larger game fish species that are not commonly eaten, are too rare to be commonly encountered, or are not favorably sought by anglers for sporting purposes. Many of these species are actually very important in the commercial fishing industry, where they make up the bulk of commercial food fish catches in inland freshwater bodies.

== Etymology ==
The first reference to the term "rough" as applied to fish species is in the historical work A History of Fish and Fishing on the Upper Mississippi River by Carlander. In the mid- to late 19th century, commercial fishermen in the Central United States, particularly in the Mississippi River, often netted and processed large quantities of river fish in their boats, and would then travel many miles up or down river to deliver these fish to markets for sale. In hot summer weather, the slow, heavily loaded boats often had to be lightened quickly to ensure that the entire catch did not become spoiled before reaching the markets. The common practice of the time was to save the fully processed fish, since these commanded a higher price at market. Rough-dressed fish (or fish sold "in the rough" — which means they had the internal organs removed but were not yet filleted) were discarded by dumping the carcasses into the river to lighten the boat. Thus, originally a "rough fish" was a fish of any species that had been only partly processed and which could not be sold for full price. The term subsequently evolved into a derogatory term for any fish that was undesirable or unpopular.

== Usage variations ==
The term "coarse fish" is used in the United Kingdom to describe all fishes besides trout and salmon, but it is not a derogatory term.

The Minnesota Department of Natural Resources has made preliminary efforts to replace the term "rough fish" with "underused fish", like some other state agencies have actually done, but this has remained an incomplete effort in Minnesota.

== Subjectivity of definition ==
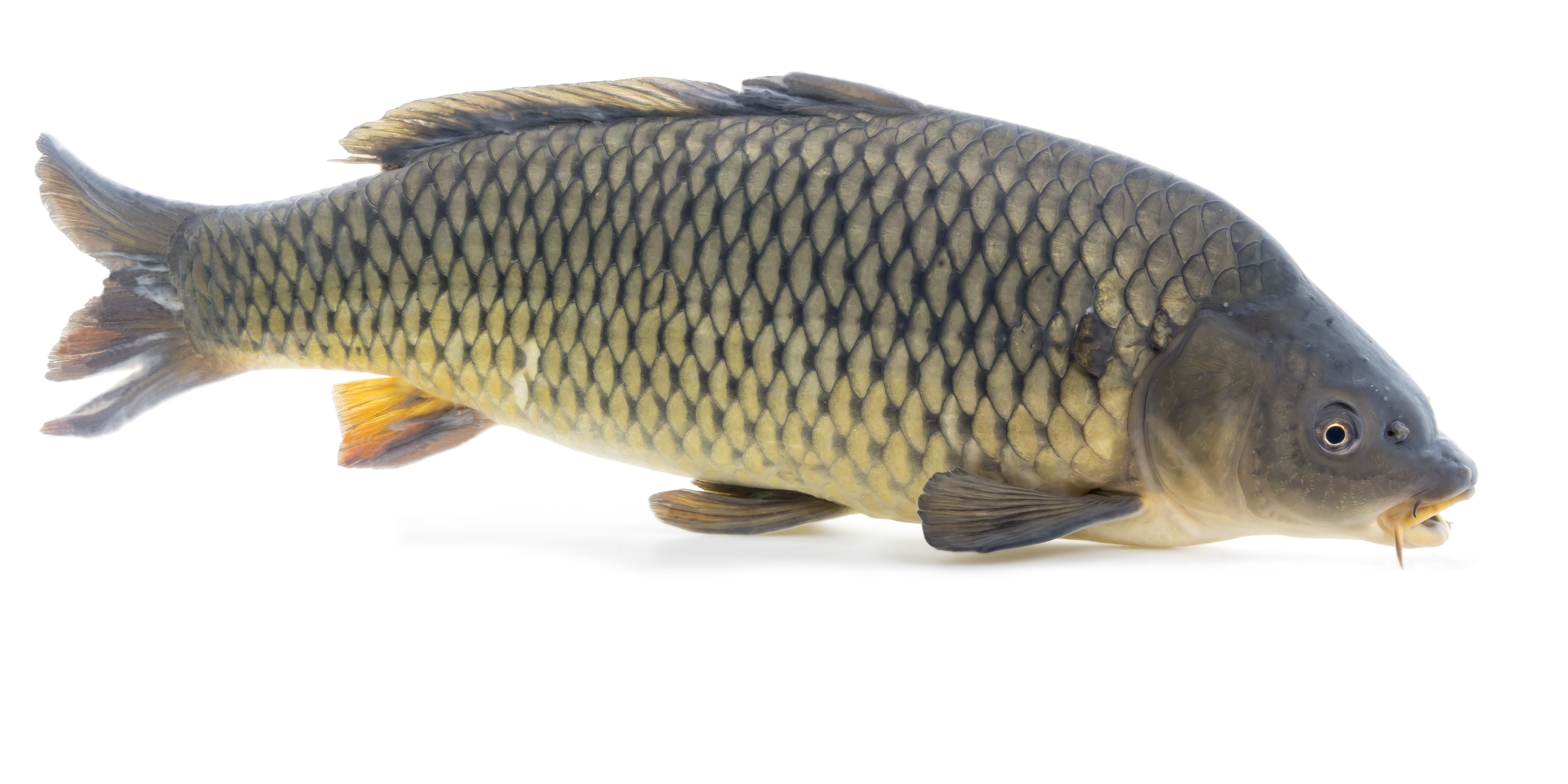
The common carp is often considered a rough fish

There is no standard list of rough fishes. A fish that is considered "rough" in one region may be considered a desirable game and food fish in another, often due to cultural differences or simply regional tradition. For example, the common carp is considered an undesirable rough fish in the United States and Australia, but is the premier game fish of continental Europe and the single most important food fish across most of Asia. Further, some rough fish become game fish (and vice versa) over time, as different angling methods, sporting opportunities (e.g. modernized bowfishing) and new ways to prepare, cook and consume the fish evolve. In the U.S., the longnose gar is considered a rough fish and undesirable nuisance in Ohio, but in Louisiana it is considered a desirable food fish. Due to the many small bones, it is rarely filleted; instead, the meat is usually minced and rolled with seasonings into "gar balls" to be fried as meatballs.

=== Native vis-à-vis exotic ===
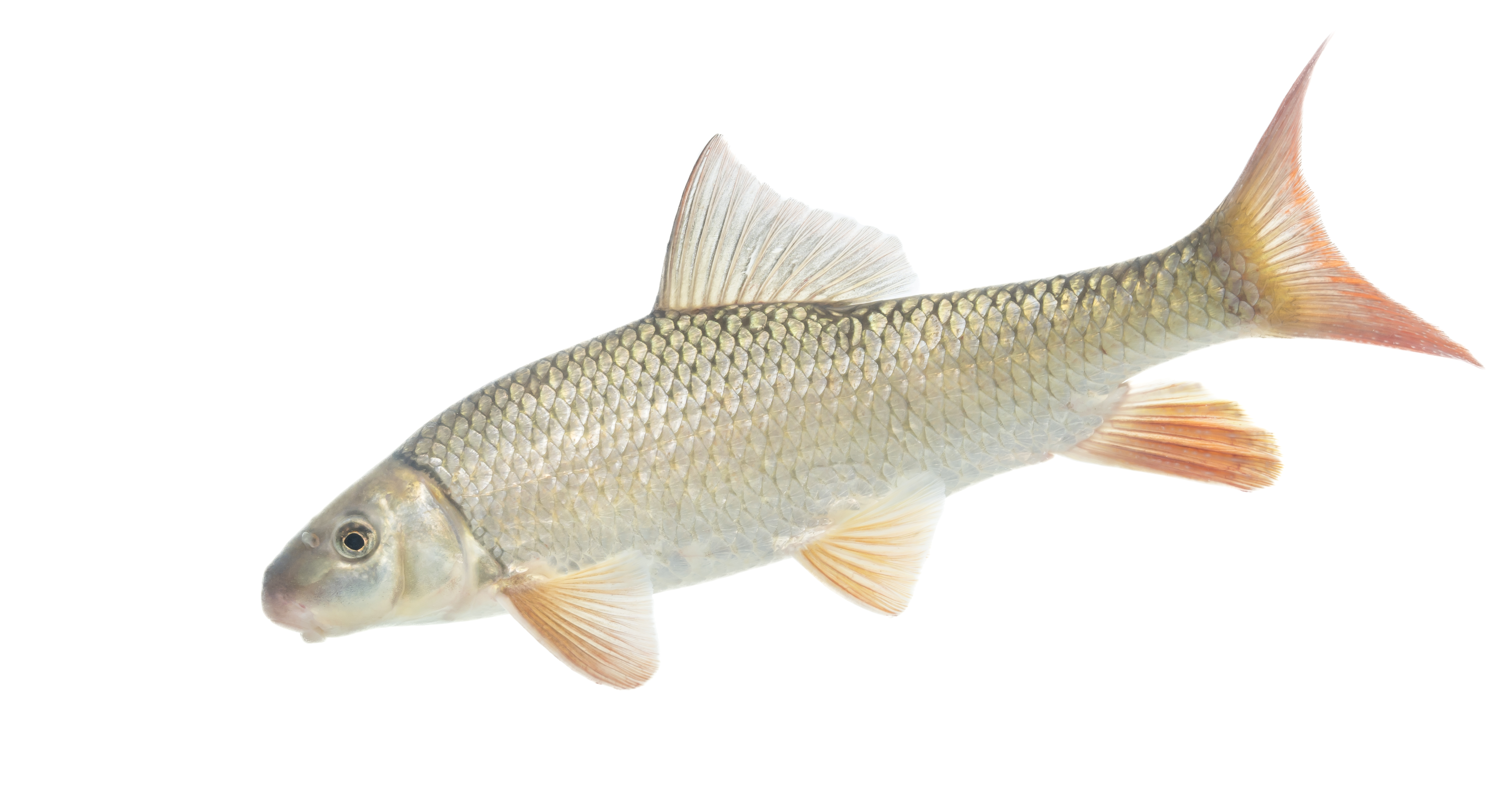
Suckers such as this shorthead redhorse are often considered rough fish even in their native range

Many US state agencies use "rough fish" as a catch-all term to combine both unappreciated native fish species with problematic invasive species. This creates confusion about the endemism of species native to North America. For example, some "rough fishes" are exotic species that have been introduced into North American waters from other continents either intentionally or unintentionally (e.g. the common carp, bighead carp, silver carp, grass carp, snakehead), that have established naturalized foothold in the new habitats. Other "rough fishes" are native species that can be confused with Asian carps because they look superficially similar (bigmouth buffalo, smallmouth buffalo and suckers). Because in many states all of these native fish are lumped together as "rough" along with invasive species, the public is quick to label and treat them all as invasive "carp". Still other rough fishes are native fishes completely unlike carp, but are categorized as such because they are underused or unpopular. In North America native "rough fish" such as suckers have historically been scapegoated for human environmental destruction and its impacts on popular fish species such as Pacific salmon and smallmouth bass. They have also been seen by some fisheries managers as inferior to introduced species such as brown trout for aesthetic reasons.

== Prospects ==
Many rough fish species are federally recognized as endangered, threatened, candidate or species of concern. Because these native American fishes have limited and declining populations and are at risk of extinction, they are listed under the Endangered Species Act. Some rough fishes listed by the United States Fish and Wildlife Service are:

- Blue sucker (Cycleptus elongatus)
- Razorback sucker (Xyrauchen texanus)
- Robust redhorse (Moxostoma robustum)
- Cui-ui (Chasmistes cujus)
- Gray redhorse (Moxostoma congestum)
- Sicklefin redhorse (Moxostoma spp.)
- Shortnose sucker (Chasmistes brevirostris)
- Flannelmouth sucker (Catostomus latipinnis)
- Greater redhorse (Moxostoma valenciennesi)
- Colorado pikeminnow (pikeminnows – Ptychocheilus spp.)
- Roundtail chub (Gila robusta)
- Humpback chub (Gila cypha)
- Bonytail chub (Gila elegans)

== See also ==
- Atlantic croaker
- Bycatch
- Carp
- Freshwater drum
- Gar
- Bowfin
- Achirus lineatus

== Sources ==
- Carlander HB (1954) A history of fish and fishing in the upper Mississippi River Upper Mississippi River Conservation Committee, University of California. Html version
- Rob Buffler and Tom Dickson (1990) Fishing for Buffalo: A Guide to the Pursuit, Lore & Cuisine of Buffalo, Carp, Mooneye, Gar, and other "Rough" Fish Culpepper Press, Minneapolis.
- Becker, George C. (1983) Fishes of Wisconsin Madison, Wisconsin: University of Wisconsin Press
- Minnesota Fishing Regulation Booklet, 2010
- US Fish and Wildlife Service Endangered Species Program
