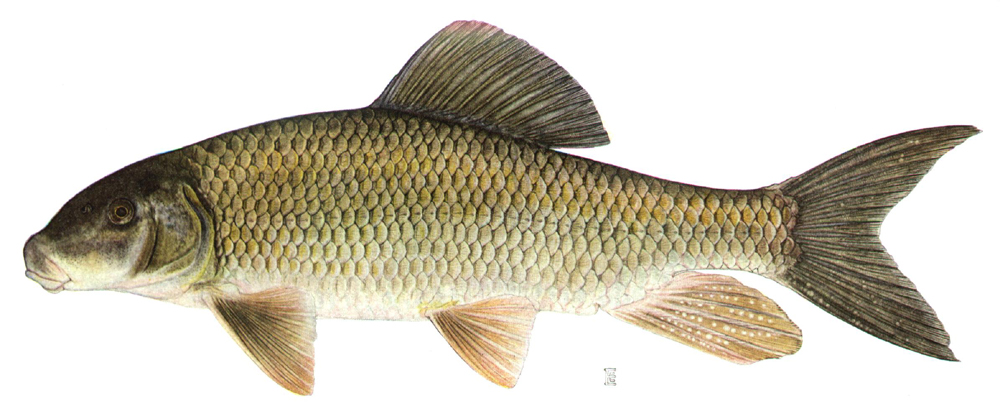
- Silver redhorse (Moxostoma anisurum)

Conservation status
- Least Concern (IUCN 3.1)

- Secure (NatureServe)

Scientific classification
- Kingdom: Animalia
- Phylum: Chordata
- Class: Actinopterygii
- Order: Cypriniformes
- Family: Catostomidae
- Genus: Moxostoma
- Species: M. anisurum

Binomial name
- Moxostoma anisurum (Rafinesque, 1820)

Synonyms
- Catostomus anisurus Rafinesque, 1820

= Silver redhorse =

Species of fish

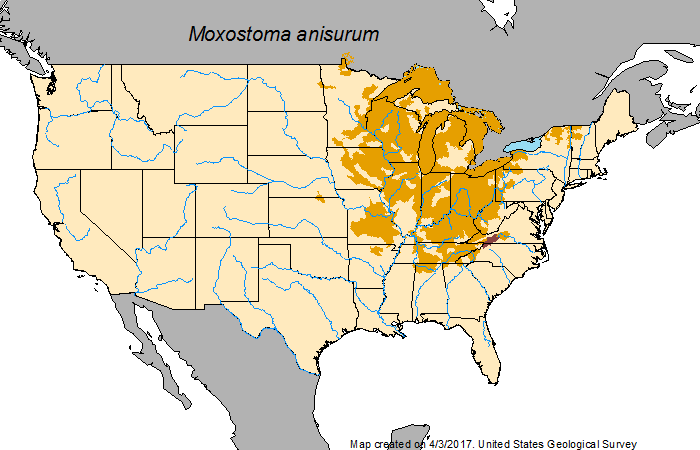
The United States distribution of the Silver Redhorse.

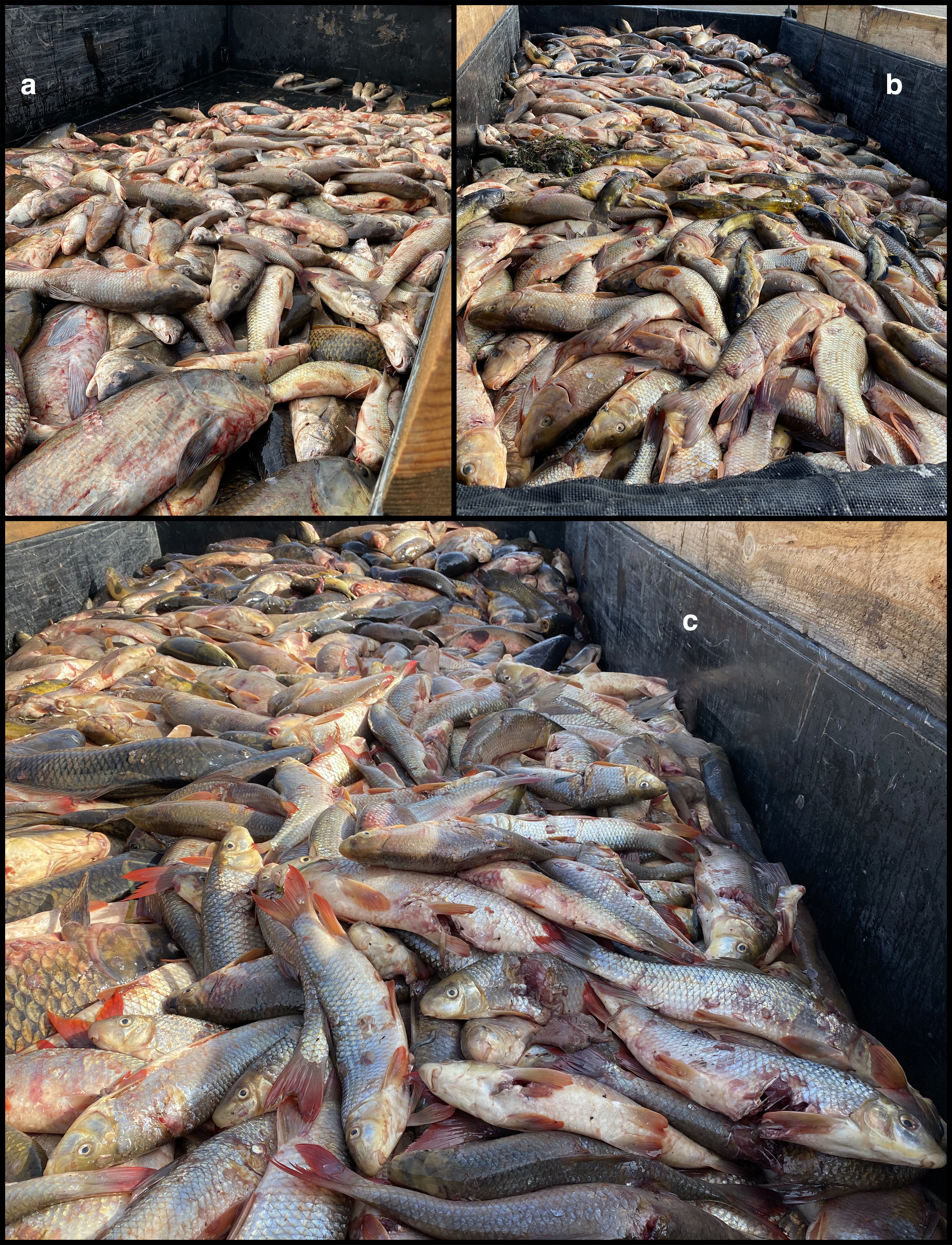
Seen here are more than a thousand redhorse that were dumped for disposal at a single-night bowfishing tournament in Minnesota, along with numerous other native fish species. Silver redhorse were a large part of this redhorse disposal, which occurs unregulated at bowfishing tournaments. Native species made up ~92% of the taxa dumped at this tournament. See 2023 study for more details.

The silver redhorse (Moxostoma anisurum: Moxostoma= mouth to suck; anisurum = unequal tail) is a species of freshwater fish endemic to Canada and the United States. It is the longest-lived redhorse known (a group of 25 extant species), with a maximum reported age of 41 years. Sometimes called redhorse or sucker for short, it is in the family Catostomidae with other suckers. The species is distributed from Quebec to Alberta and is also in the Mississippi River, St. Lawrence River, Ohio River, and the Great Lakes basins. The current world record is 6.75 kilograms (14 lb 14 oz), caught by Chris Stephenson on Pickwick Lake in Alabama, April 1995 and certified by National Freshwater Fishing Hall of Fame. This species is of growing interest to rod-and-line anglers. The long-lived and late-maturing silver redhorse is also a sportfish pursued by kill-and-dump bowfishing, a 21st century unregulated sport that produces tons of wanton waste, and thus management and conservation are in need of updating.

== Morphology ==
The silver redhorse is silver on both sides and has a dark gray-brown back and a slate gray tail. The caudal fin is large and moderately forked. Each lobe of the fin is pointed and equal in size. On the silver sides there are 41–42 cycloid lateral line scales. The single dorsal fin does not have any dorsal spines, but instead contains 14–17 soft rays. Their dorsal fin is slightly convex (rounded outward) and is located approximately in the middle of the back. There is no adipose fin (unstructured fin found behind the rayed dorsal fin) present on the back of the fish. The mouth of the silver redhorse is in the inferior position, as it is a bottom feeder. The rear edge of the silver redhorse lips forms a deep "V". Because of extreme similarities, the silver red horse is commonly confused with the Black redhorse and the Golden redhorse. However, both of these redhorses have slightly concave dorsal fins (curves in toward body) with only 12–14 fin rays. Additionally the Silver red horse is more deep-bodied than the golden or black redhorse. It typically weights 2–5 pounds (0.91–2.27 kg) and measures 18–24 inches (46–61 cm) long, but it can reach up to 10 pounds (4.5 kg) and 30 in (760 mm).

== Geographic distribution ==
The native range of the silver red horse is the Great Lakes and the St. Lawrence and Mississippi River basins. However, there have been instances in which the fish was found in Clayton lake and the New River Drainage in North Carolina. The silver redhorse is also widely distributed in eastern North America from Missouri to Quebec with most residing in the southeastern United States. It is typically found in lakes and in small to large rivers, where it often lives in undercut banks or protruding tree roots. They are also found in deep pools with little to no current and a sand substrate at the bottom of the pool useful for burying their eggs. They are a good indicator of water quality as they cannot tolerate murky water.

== Diet ==
Due to its inferior mouth position, this fish is a bottom feeder. It feeds on mollusks, algae, detritus, immature insects, and other small invertebrates. Monogenea parasites have been found in the gills of the silver redhorse.

== Life history ==
The silver redhorse generally spawns in the spring in or around April or May when the water temperatures reach around 53 °F (12 °C). They take advantage of the shallow landforms flowing channels, also known as riffles, and spawn at the top and the bottoms of the riffles at night. One study in Quebec, Canada found that the silver redhorse is abundant in what they call V-males, as they outnumber the females considerably. For every female on the spawning bed, there is a minimum of 2 males that are used to successfully reproduce. The common methodology includes two males pressing a female between them, causing a vibration to occur while the egg and the sperm are released. The females bury their eggs in the gravel and offer no further parental care. Reproduction maturity for the species happens late in its life usually around four to five years of age. The species thrives in deep bottomed lakes and river systems which promote optimal nest succession year in and year out. The lifespan for the species is several decades, with 41 years being the maximum age reported.

== Relationship with humans ==
The species is quite abundant in southeastern rivers including the Mississippi, Missouri, and Ohio river systems. The silver redhorse is increasingly recreationally fished for throughout most of the areas in which it inhabits. This includes bowfishing, a sport which disposes whole-bodied native fish by the ton, including silver redhorse. In Minnesota, 21st century tournament bowfishing of redhorse exceeds the commercial harvest level by more than 200 times. Currently, this long-lived, late-maturing, and variably-reproducing species is of conservation concern and urgently requires new management. The silver redhorse is listed as threatened in the Strawberry River basin in Arkansas. The IGFA all-tackle record is tied at 5.19 kg (11 lb 7 oz), with one being caught from Plum Creek in Wisconsin in 1985, and the other from the Chagrin River, Ohio on 19 March 2024.
