= River redhorse =

Conservation status
- Least Concern (IUCN 3.1)

Scientific classification
- Kingdom: Animalia
- Phylum: Chordata
- Class: Actinopterygii
- Order: Cypriniformes
- Family: Catostomidae
- Genus: Moxostoma
- Species: M. carinatum

Binomial name
- Moxostoma carinatum (Cope, 1870)

Synonyms
- Placopharynx carinatus Cope, 1870

Species of fish

The river redhorse (Moxostoma carinatum) is a species of freshwater fish endemic to the eastern half of the United States and southeastern Canada. They can range from 10 to 30 inches in length and can potentially reach a weight of more than 10 pounds after maturity. It is typically found in clear, large creeks and rivers, though it is sometimes also found in lakes. They are sometimes speared or caught with hook and line using crayfish or worms as bait.

A bottom-feeder, it feeds on mussels, snails, crustaceans and immature aquatic insects. Its common names include big-sawed sucker, river mullet, greater redhorse, redfin redhorse and redhorse sucker. It has the following characteristics:

== Distribution ==
The river redhorse occurs throughout the central and eastern Mississippi River System and the Gulf Slope from Florida to Louisiana. In Canada, its distribution is characterized by disjunct populations in southern Ontario and Quebec as well as Alberta. This species has declined considerably over much of its range in the last 200 years. Populations still occur in the Grand, Trent, Thames, Mississippi, Gatineau and Richelieu rivers, and recent data suggest a wider distribution in the Ottawa River than previously documented. However, this fish appears to no longer exist in the Châteauguay and Yamaska watersheds and has declined dramatically in the St. Lawrence River.

== Threats ==
Due to its narrow range of habitat preferences, spawning requirements and intolerance of high turbidity, siltation and pollution, the river redhorse is susceptible to a number of threats. Hydroelectric development and flood control dams cause habitat fragmentation and alter habitat conditions, resulting in restricted movements of individual fish and limited gene flow between populations. Also, changes in flow regime and siltation of spawning habitats may reduce recruitment. Agricultural and municipal activities that affect water quality (increased sediment load, excessive nutrients) also adversely impact this species. Because of its sensitivity, it is used as an indicator species to gauge stream health.

== Similar Species ==
The river redhorse resembles all redhorse species especially the shorthead redhorse (M. macrolepidotum) and the Greater Redhorse (M. valenciennesi). The river redhorse can be distinguished, although with difficulty, from most other members of the genus by its heavy pharyngeal arch with molariform teeth. The river redhorse's pharyngeal teeth are enlarged and appear molar-like, which helps distinguish them from the greater redhorse. Additional features that may distinguish it from other redhorse sucker species include its coloration, specifically in the wild. The coloration can appear greenish or faintly brown along their dorsal side. Whereas along the ventral side, they will be white, and the lateral sides will predominantly appear to be yellow. There are also dark spots, that appear crescent-shaped, on the scales along the dorsal and lateral sides. The pectoral, pelvic, and anal fins all have an orange or red tint. The dorsal and caudal fins, however, will appear red entirely. plicate lips and caudal peduncle scale count.
