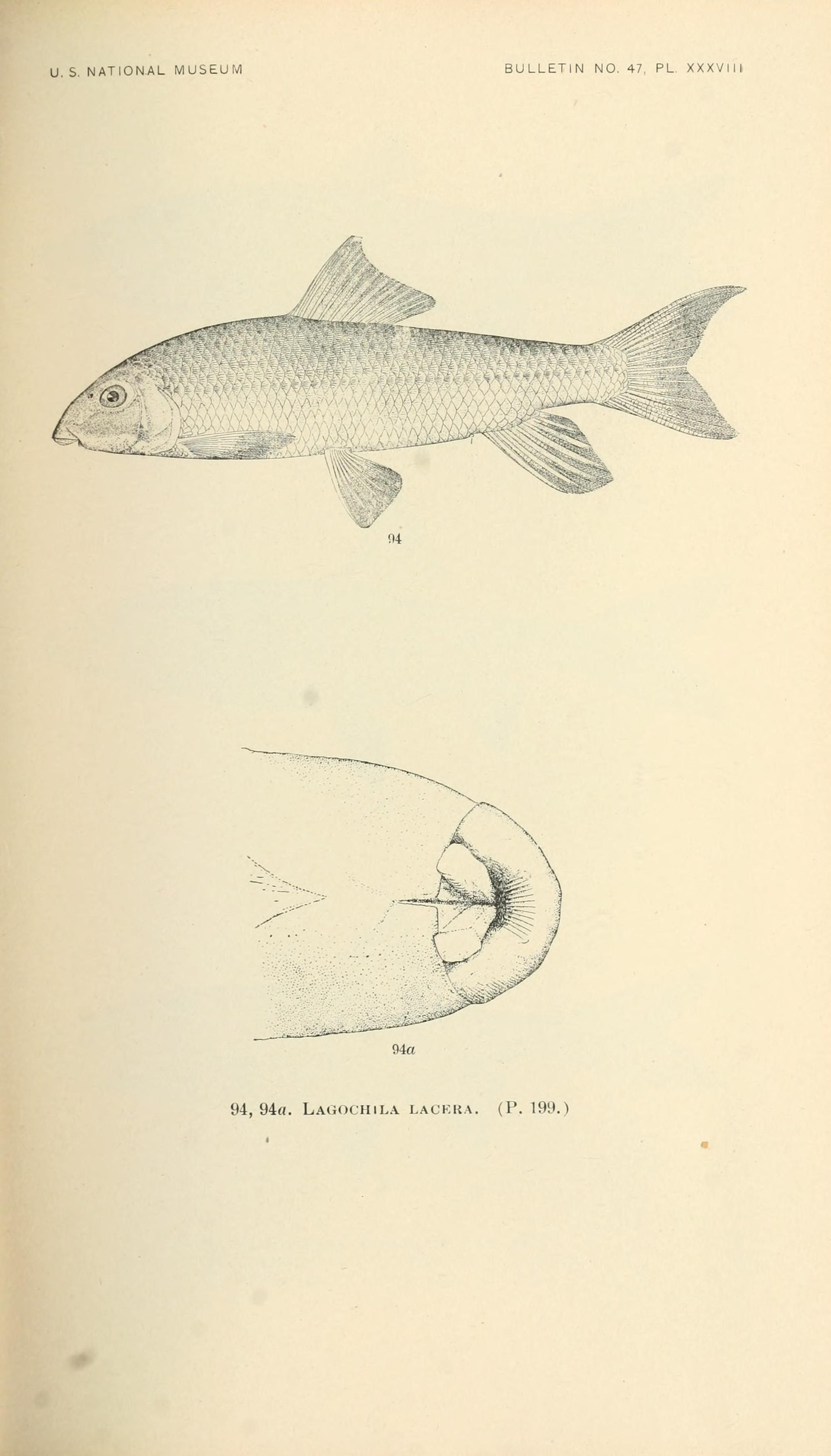

Conservation status
- Extinct (IUCN 3.1)

Scientific classification
- Kingdom: Animalia
- Phylum: Chordata
- Class: Actinopterygii
- Division: Teleostei
- Order: Cypriniformes
- Family: Catostomidae
- Genus: Moxostoma
- Species: †M. lacerum

Binomial name
- †Moxostoma lacerum (D. S. Jordan & Brayton, 1877)

Synonyms
- Lagochila lacera, D. S. Jordan & Brayton, 1877–78

= Harelip sucker =

Extinct species of fish

The harelip sucker (Moxostoma lacerum) was a species of ray-finned fish in the family Catostomidae. It was found only in the United States. It is considered extinct as it has not been seen alive since 1893.

== Description ==
Two mouth characteristics separate the harelip sucker from all other catostomids: a non-protractile upper lip and a lower lip that is divided into two distinct lobes. The head is short, accounting for only 20 to 22 percent of the standard length. The dorsal fin has 11 or 12 soft rays, and its free margin is slightly concave. The lateral line is complete and contains 42 to 46 scales. Body colors of freshly caught specimens are described by David Starr Jordan and Alembert Winthrop Brayton. The back is olive to brownish, and the venter and sides are silver or white. The lower fins are slightly orange, while the remaining fins are cream to dusky. The dorsal fin is dusky and edged in black. Although morphologically distinct from one another, this species and the blacktail redhorse in the Mobile basin have similar body colors.

== Distribution ==
The harelip sucker was first collected in 1859 and described in 1877. It spread from the south-east United States to the middle and lower Ohio basin, the White drainage of the Ozarks and the Maumee system of Lake Erie. This fish holds the dubious distinction of being the fish species lost from the largest number of American states—eight. The last specimen was collected in 1893. By 1970, the species was believed to be extinct. The only known collection in Alabama came from Cypress Creek, Lauderdale County, in 1889. On the slight chance of collecting this species the Alabama Department of Conservation and natural resources repeatedly sampled the lower reaches of Cypress Creek in 1992 and 1993. Although they examined a total of 30 species, including six suckers, their efforts were unsuccessful. The last researcher that has reported receiving a specimen claims he found retrieved it from the Elk River in 1882, probably from Tennessee. It is believed that these fish became extinct when their habitats were modified by siltation. From anatomical studies we see that these fish used sight to feed. They resided in very clear streams. It is believed that their demise began with the deforestation and land cultivation of the early nineteenth century.

== Ecology ==
Harelip sucker populations came from clear, gravel- or rock-bottomed streams with moderate to swift currents (Jenkins and Burkhead, 1993). The unusual modification of the lips of the harelip sucker suggests that it had a very specialized diet. From the stomachs of preserved specimens scientists have found snails, limpets, fingernail clams, and crustaceans.

== Life history ==
Because of the early extinction of the harelip sucker there are no detailed life history studies, but there is at least some biological information that was taken from the approximately 30 preserved specimens. Very little information exists on its precise habitat and life history, though Klippart (1878) relates that these fish were called May suckers because they spawned in May. The only other thing known about the life history of this fish is that adult harelip sucker reached 18 inches in length and weighed several pounds. Despite the wide range this fish once had it became the first recently extinct fish with the last specimen being retrieved in 1893.

== Extinction ==
The species' extinction is believed to have been caused by human encroachment. In the nineteenth and early twentieth centuries there were no regulations on deforestation or cultivation, and this caused the habitat of the harelip sucker to become very silty. This impeded their feeding because they fed by sight, but it also killed the mollusks and crustaceans which were the harelip sucker's primary prey, leading to starvation.
