= Longlip jumprock =

Conservation status
- Data Deficient (IUCN 3.1)

Scientific classification
- Kingdom: Animalia
- Phylum: Chordata
- Class: Actinopterygii
- Order: Cypriniformes
- Family: Catostomidae
- Genus: Moxostoma
- Species: M. albidum

Binomial name
- Moxostoma albidum (Girard, 1856)

Synonyms
- Ptychostomus albidus Girard, 1856

Species of fish

The longlip jumprock (Moxostoma albidum) is a Mexican species of freshwater fish in the family Catostomidae.
