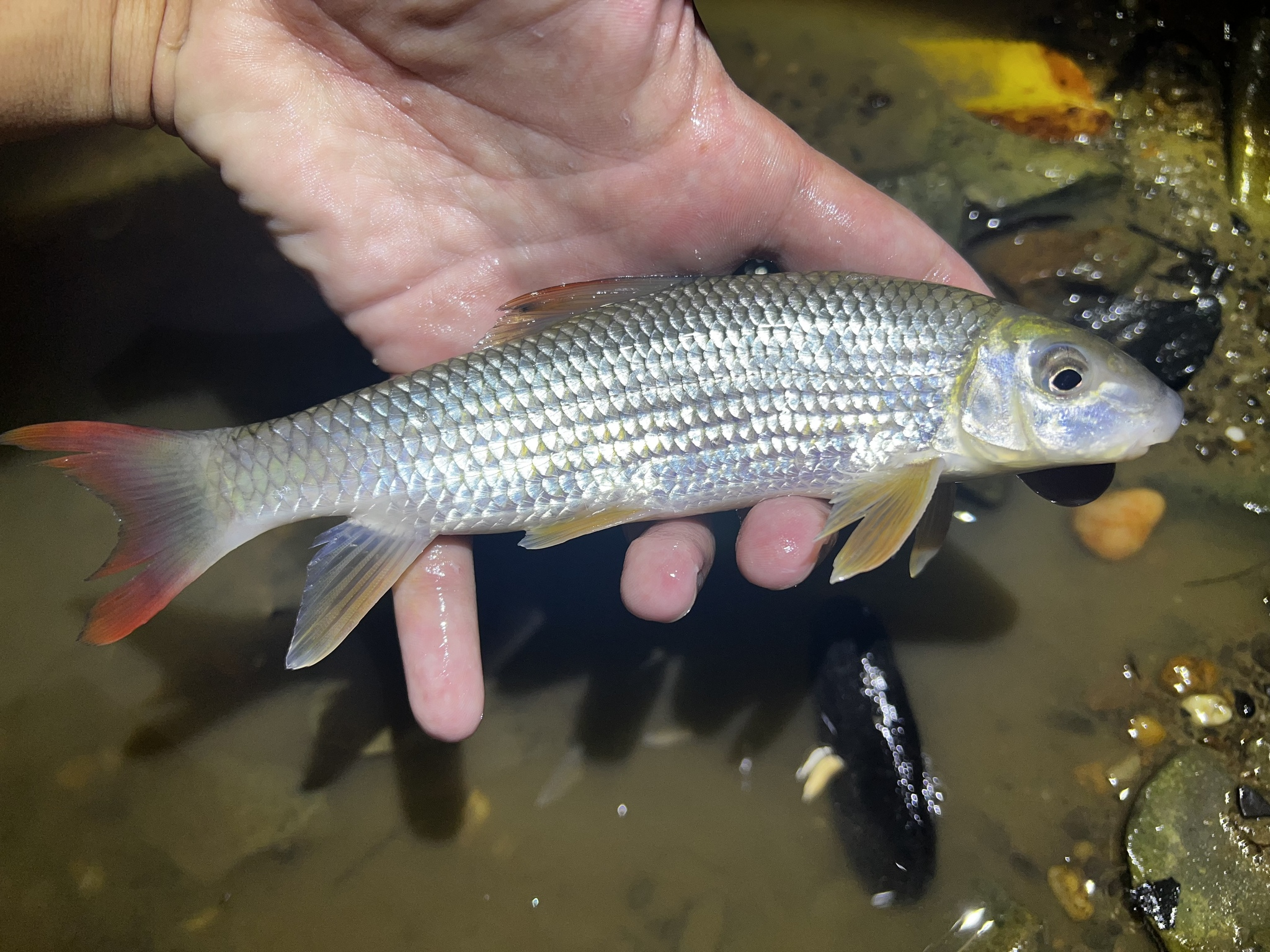

Conservation status
- Least Concern (IUCN 3.1)

Scientific classification
- Kingdom: Animalia
- Phylum: Chordata
- Class: Actinopterygii
- Order: Cypriniformes
- Family: Catostomidae
- Genus: Moxostoma
- Species: M. breviceps

Binomial name
- Moxostoma breviceps (Cope, 1870)

Synonyms
- Ptychostomus breviceps Cope, 1870

= Smallmouth redhorse =

Species of fish

Smallmouth redhorse (Moxostoma breviceps) is a species of ray-finned fish in the genus Moxostoma.
