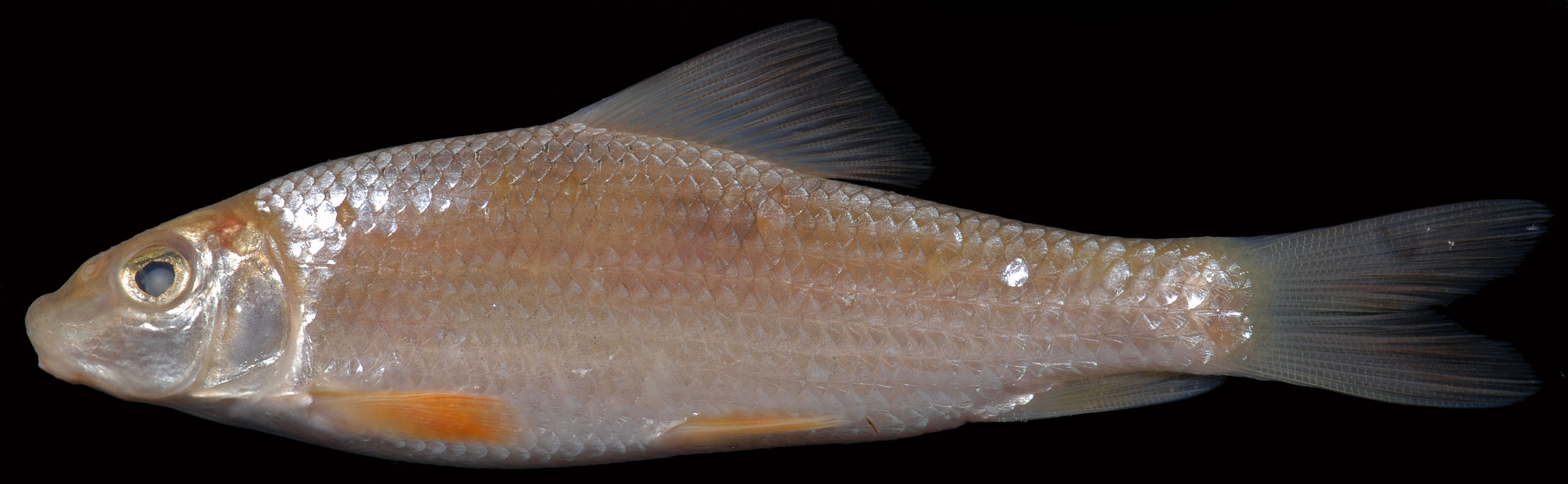

Conservation status
- Least Concern (IUCN 3.1)

Scientific classification
- Kingdom: Animalia
- Phylum: Chordata
- Class: Actinopterygii
- Order: Cypriniformes
- Family: Catostomidae
- Genus: Moxostoma
- Species: M. collapsum

Binomial name
- Moxostoma collapsum (Cope, 1870)

Synonyms
- Ptychostomus collapsus Cope, 1870

= Notchlip redhorse =

Species of fish

The notchlip redhorse (Moxostoma collapsum) is a species of ray-finned fish in the genus Moxostoma.

== Relationship with humans ==
The world record notchlip redhorse stands at 0.57 kg (1 lb 4 oz) taken from the Green River in North Carolina in 2018.
