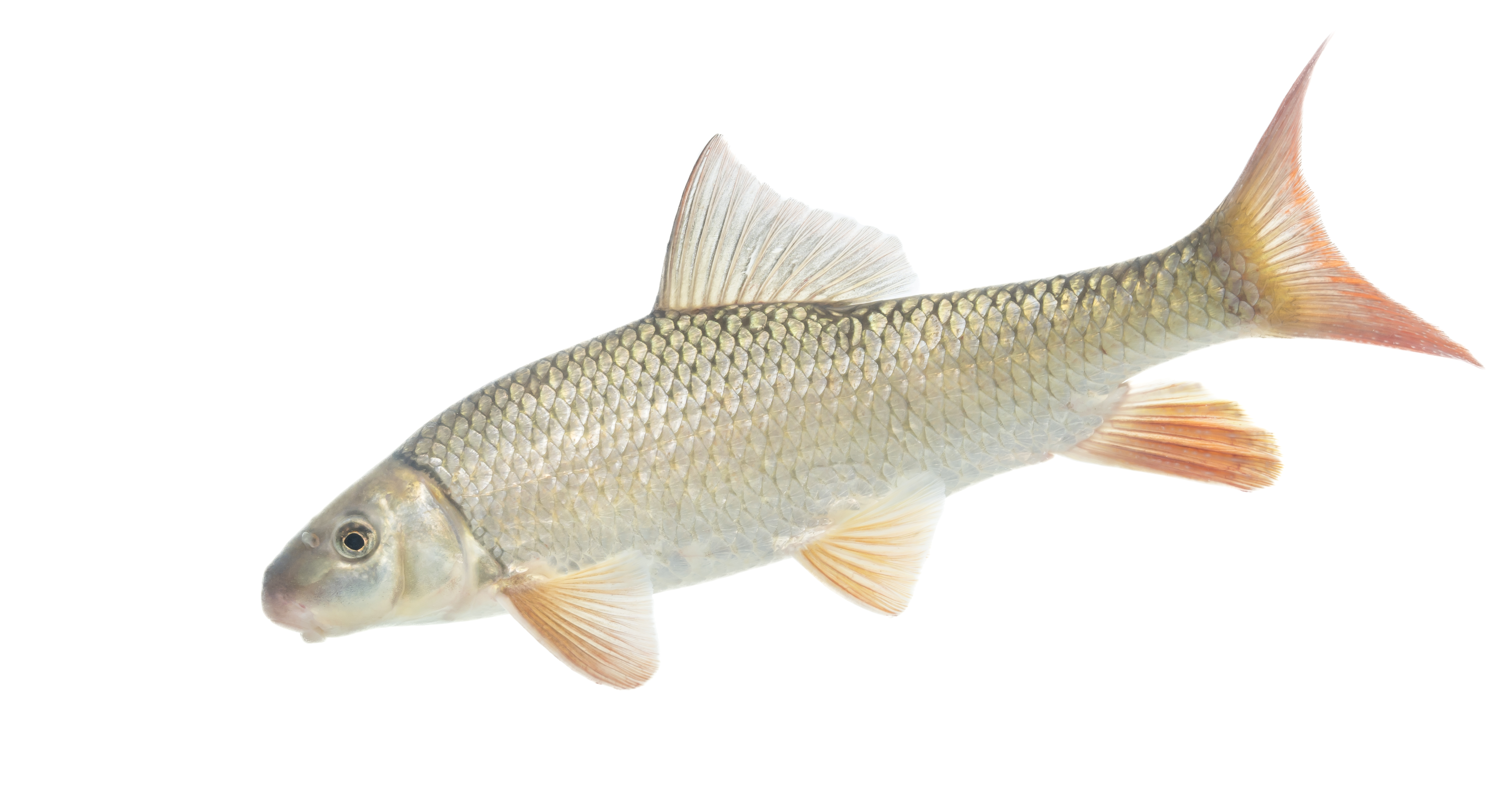

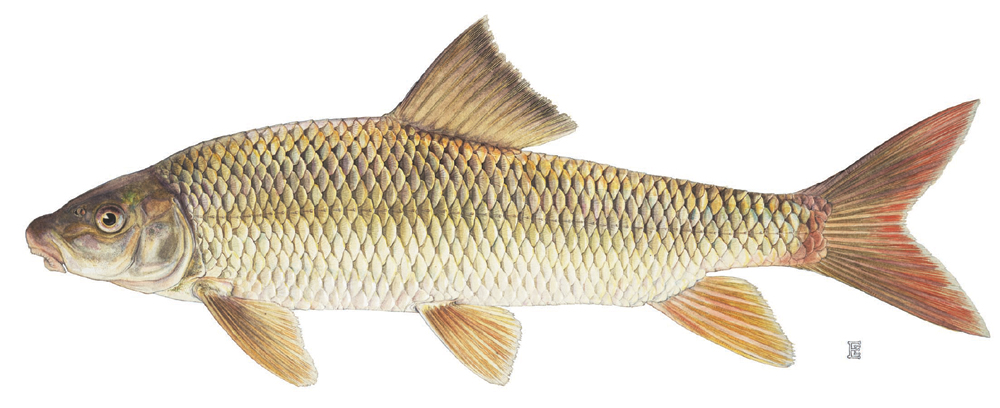
- Shorthead redhorse (Moxostoma macrolepidotum)

Conservation status
- Least Concern (IUCN 3.1)

Scientific classification
- Kingdom: Animalia
- Phylum: Chordata
- Class: Actinopterygii
- Division: Teleostei
- Order: Cypriniformes
- Family: Catostomidae
- Genus: Moxostoma
- Species: M. macrolepidotum

Binomial name
- Moxostoma macrolepidotum (Lesueur, 1817)

Synonyms
- Catostomus macrolepidotus Lesueur, 1817

= Shorthead redhorse =

Species of fish

The shorthead redhorse (Moxostoma macrolepidotum) is a wide-ranging species in North America. The shorthead redhorse is native to central and eastern North America. However, its range has expanded to include areas like the Hudson estuary and Grayson County, Texas. It inhabits small to large rivers and lakes, and lives in the benthic zone. Shorthead redhorse feed on benthic invertebrates and can consume plant material from the benthic environment that it inhabits. When it spawns, shorthead redhorse move into more shallow streams and spawn over gravel or rocky shoals. They will also spawn in springs with swift moving water. The shorthead redhorse is important to humans because it is a game fish. It is also important to anglers because of its role in the ecosystem; it is prey for larger game fish such as northern pike and muskellunge.

One source gives one of its English names as "common mullet". Others are redfin, redfin sucker, red sucker, redhorse mullet, shorthead mullet, mullet, bigscale sucker, common redhorse, northern redhorse, Des Moines Plunger.

== Geographic distribution ==
Historically, the shorthead redhorse is native to North America. Its native range includes the Great Lakes, Hudson Bay, Mississippi River, and Saint Lawrence River basins. They ranged across from Quebec to Alberta and as far south as northern Alabama and Oklahoma. Shorthead redhorse also originally occupied the Atlantic Slope drainages, ranging from the Hudson River in New York to the Santee River in South Carolina. When the Tennessee Valley Authority started building dams in the 1930s in an attempt to create power, the dams blocked different fish such as striped bass, from moving upstream to their spawning ranges. While some fish ranges have decreased since the construction of the dams, the shorthead redhorse's range has expanded. The shorthead redhorse is a "habitat generalist near the core of its range," so it can tolerate disturbance better than other related redhorse species such as the river redhorse, M. carinatum. Shorthead redhorse can now be found in the tidal zones of the Hudson River. They are believed to have invaded the Hudson by way of the Mohawk River and have established themselves in the Hudson estuary. Other areas they have been found in include the Embarras River system in Illinois and the Red River below Lake Texoma dam in Grayson County, Texas.

== Ecology ==
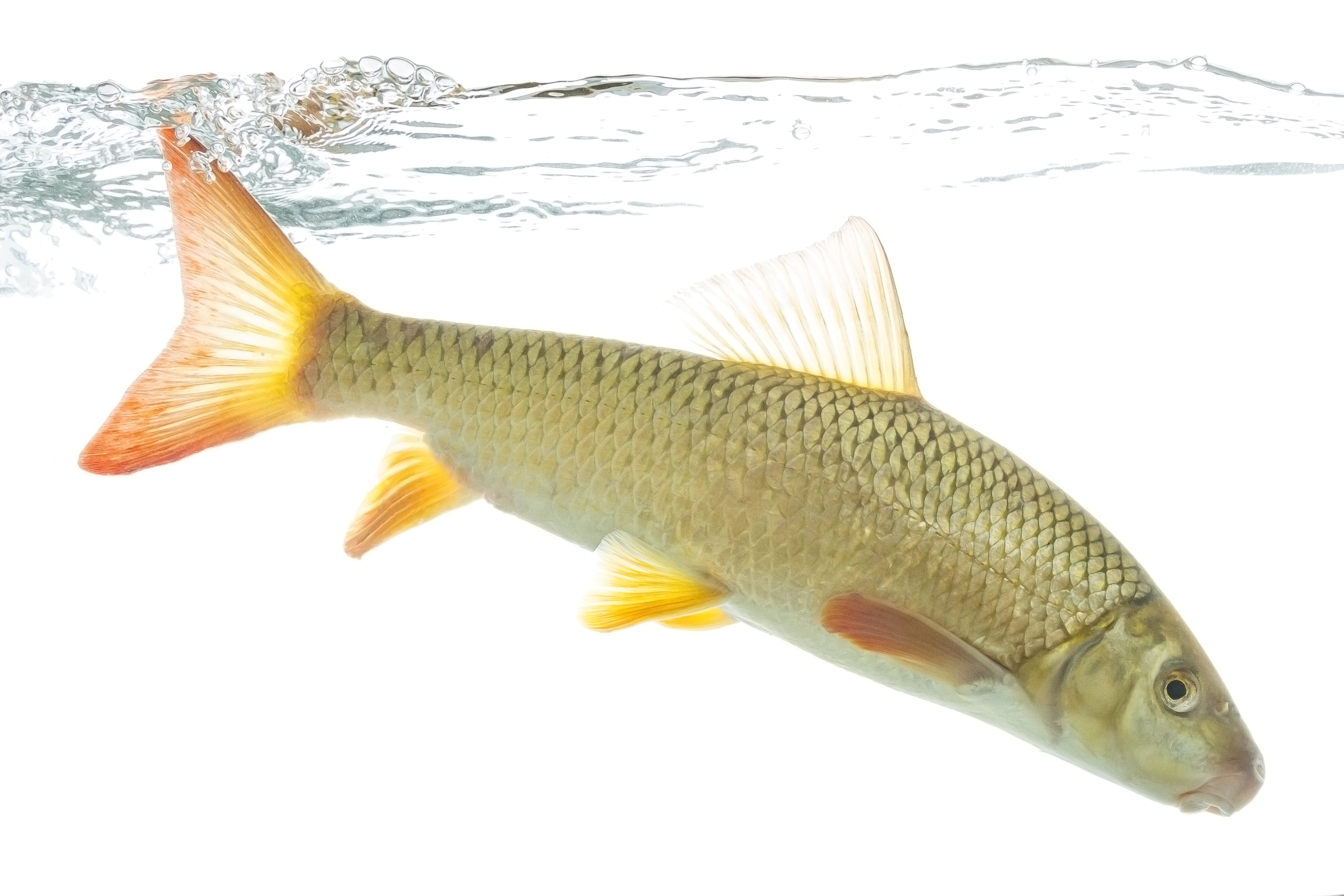
At Gavins Point National Fish Hatchery

Shorthead redhorse have a wide habitat range. They live in fresh water and are found in streams, lakes and rivers. Shorthead redhorse can tolerate clear to cloudy water and likes loose substrate like gravel and sand. These fish are benthic feeders that like to feed in riffles and rifle margins. During a study done in Illinois by Sule et al., they found that "shorthead redhorse consumed items from approximately 60 food categories, primarily invertebrate taxa". Twenty-four to sixty-eight percent of their diet was unidentified when stomach contents were analyzed. Also found, 21–50% of the unidentified matter, or 13% of their total diet, was organic matter. Shorthead redhorse eat the most insects out of all the fish in the sucker family. They can also eat microcrustacea and plant matter. Predators of shorthead redhorse vary depending on size. Juveniles can be eaten by northern pike, walleyes, and smallmouth bass. Adult or larger shorthead redhorse are eaten by northern pike and muskellunge. The shorthead redhorse does not actively compete for food. Because of their wide range of prey and eating the most vertebrates of all the suckers, they do not have a competitor. Humans impact shorthead redhorse habitat. The construction of dams blocked free flowing rivers like the Mississippi in which they live, disrupting their spawning migration routes. Shorthead redhorse are killed easily by pollutants in the water. "The upstream migratory range of shorthead redhorse in a Maryland river decreased due to an increase in chlorinated sewage outfalls". Factory pollutants are dumped into streams or rivers and will settle onto the bottom. Because such a large portion of the shorthead redhorse's diet is sediment, it ingests high concentrations of the chemicals and can die.

== Life history ==
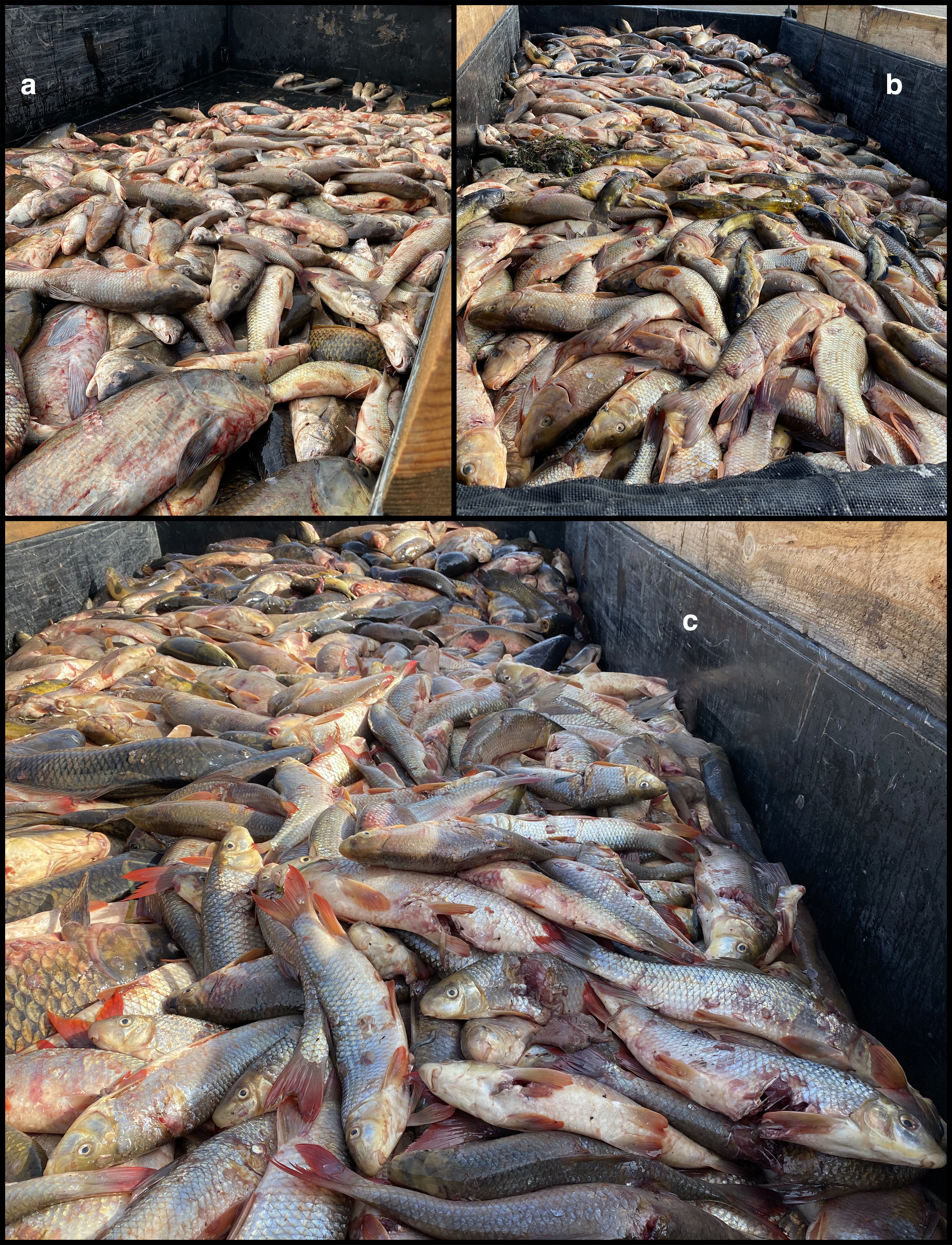
Wanton waste of native fish by the ton - in the 21st century. Four species of redhorse composed the majority (55%) of the take from a single-night bowfishing tournament in Minnesota, where native fish composed > 80% of the total number of fish shot and disposed. More than 1000 redhorse were dumped for disposal in this individual tournament, including piles of shorthead redhorse. For details see 2023 study.

The shorthead redhorse spawning season ranges from March to June, depending on location. In order to spawn, the water temperature has to be between 7 and 16 °C (45 and 61 °F). Shorthead redhorse spawn once a year and will travel either upstream or downstream to reach their spawning ground. Spawning areas are usually smaller rivers or steams. They are locally migrant so they do not travel long distances to get their spawning area. Shorthead redhorse spawn in shallows at the edges of sand bars or in riffles over gravel substrate. During spawning, females can produce anywhere from 18,000 to 44,000 eggs. It can take anywhere from 2–5, even 6 years for a shorthead redhorse to become sexually mature. In northern areas of cooler water, growth rates tend to be lower than more southern, warmer areas. The average life span of the shorthead redhorse varies depending on location. More northern locations with cooler water tend to have shorthead redhorse that can live to be approximately 20 years of age. Typical adult size is 12–18 inches (30–46 cm) in length, and 2–3 pounds (0.91–1.36 kg), although some individuals can reach up to 25 inches (64 cm) in length and 6 pounds (2.7 kg) in weight. However, in more southern, warmer water areas, such as the Kankakee River, the average max age is only six to seven. As mentioned previously, the construction of dams has not had a large effect on the population of shorthead redhorse, but it has had some effect. The dams affect the shorthead redhorse just as they do other fish by blocking migration pathways to spawning areas.

== Current management and wanton waste ==
The shorthead redhorse is abundant across its range and has one of the largest ranges of any sucker. This species is not currently endangered or threatened, but has become subject to unregulated bowfishing and wanton waste in the 21st century. In some states like Minnesota, shorthead redhorse disposal from 21st century tournament bowfishing exceeds that of commercial harvest by at least 200 times. As of 2002 there was no management plan for the shorthead redhorse.

== Relationship with humans ==
The shorthead redhorse is becoming a popular game fish for anglers, and a kill-and-dump sportfish via bowfishing. The shorthead redhorse is said to be one of the better tasting fish, however there are many little bones throughout the meat making it superficially unappealing to many American consumers. The meat also spoils rapidly in warm temperatures making it hard to transport. Shorthead redhorse play a key role in their ecosystems as prey for larger game fish. They are often used for bait if caught small enough. Humans impact the population the most through chemical contamination of their habitat. Bioaccumulation of chemicals is common in fish that feed near the benthic zone, like the shorthead redhorse. The current IGFA all tackle world record for the species stands at 5 pounds 6 ounces (2.4 kg), caught from the Prairie River in Minnesota, USA on May 4, 1988 by angler Greg Clusiau.
