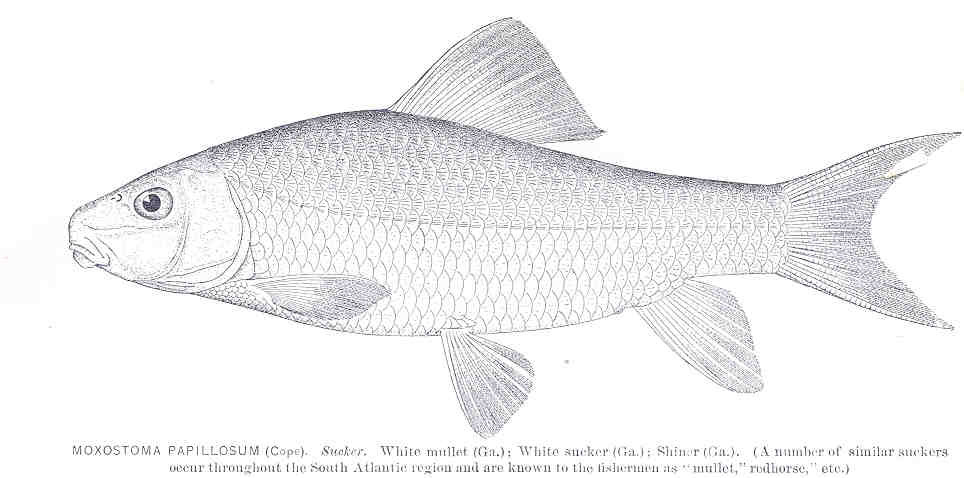

Conservation status
- Least Concern (IUCN 3.1)

Scientific classification
- Kingdom: Animalia
- Phylum: Chordata
- Class: Actinopterygii
- Order: Cypriniformes
- Family: Catostomidae
- Genus: Moxostoma
- Species: M. pappillosum

Binomial name
- Moxostoma pappillosum (Cope, 1870)

Synonyms
- Ptychostomus pappillosus Cope, 1870

= V-lip redhorse =

Species of fish

The V-lip redhorse (Moxostoma pappillosum) is a species of freshwater catostomid fish from Eastern North America. It inhabits drainages on the Atlantic Slope between Virginia and South Carolina.

== Relationship with human ==
The IGFA all tackle world record for the species stands at 0.45 kg (1 lb 0 oz) taken from the Green River in North Carolina in 2018.

== Footnotes ==
- Froese, Rainer; Pauly, Daniel (eds.). "Moxostoma pappillosum". FishBase.
