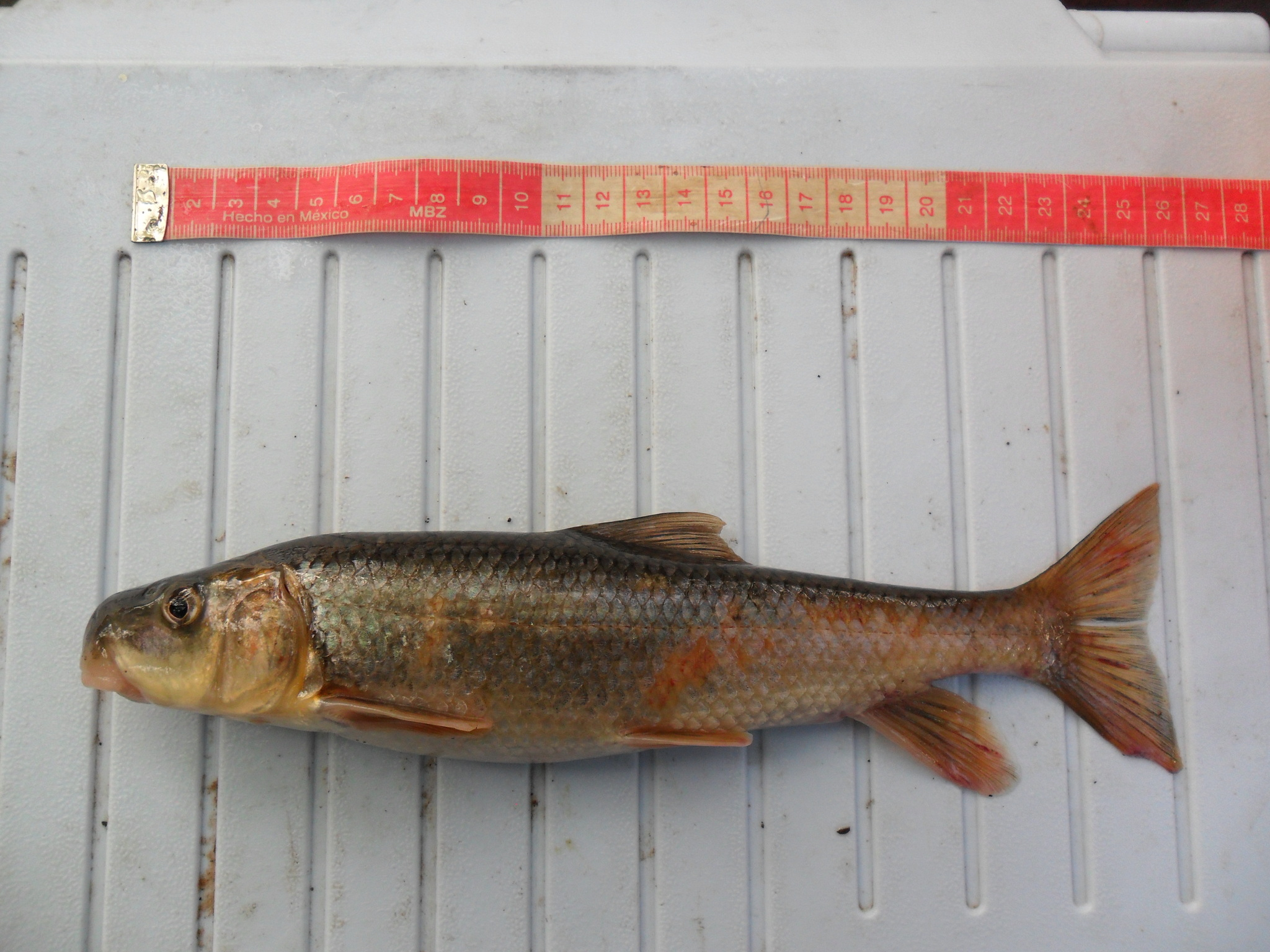
- A specimen captured in the Mascota River.

Conservation status
- Vulnerable (IUCN 3.1)

Scientific classification
- Kingdom: Animalia
- Phylum: Chordata
- Class: Actinopterygii
- Order: Cypriniformes
- Family: Catostomidae
- Genus: Moxostoma
- Species: M. mascotae

Binomial name
- Moxostoma mascotae Regan, 1907

= Mascota jumprock =

Species of fish

The Mascota jumprock (Moxostoma mascotae) is a species of ray-finned fish in the genus Moxostoma.
