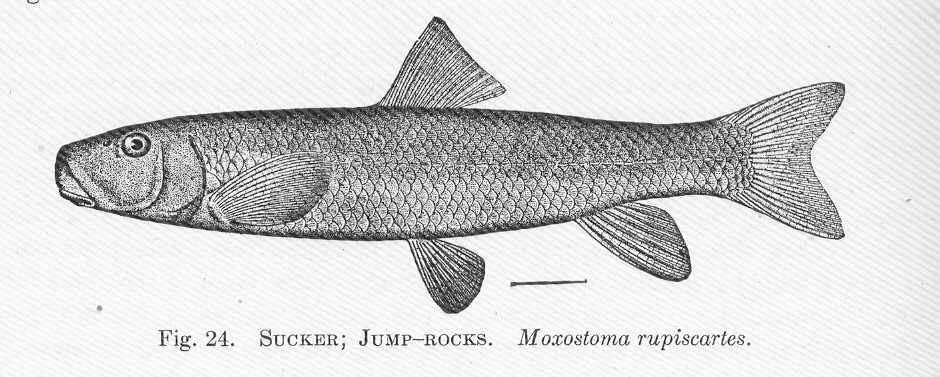

Conservation status
- Least Concern (IUCN 3.1)

Scientific classification
- Kingdom: Animalia
- Phylum: Chordata
- Class: Actinopterygii
- Order: Cypriniformes
- Family: Catostomidae
- Genus: Moxostoma
- Species: M. rupiscartes

Binomial name
- Moxostoma rupiscartes Jordan & Jenkins in Jordan, 1889
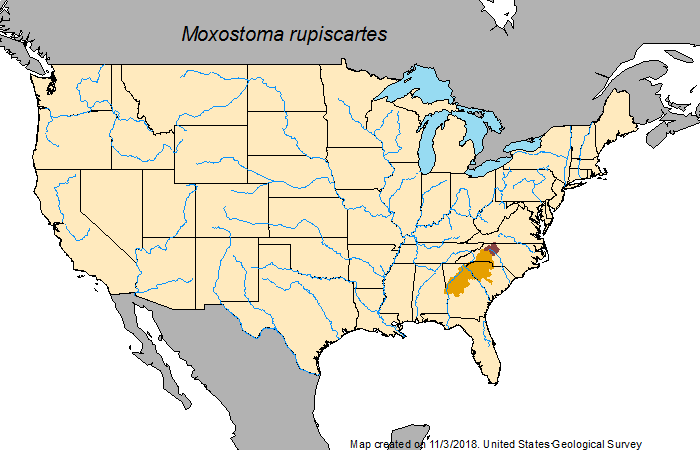
- Distribution of the striped jumprock

= Striped jumprock =

Species of fish

The striped jumprock (Moxostoma rupiscartes) is a North American freshwater fish in the genus Moxostoma.

== Description ==
The striped jumprock has a cylindrical body that is yellow-olive or brown above. There are prominent dark stripes on the back and side, which are normally slightly wider than the pale interspaces. The fins are a dusky olive to orange in color. The head is flat or slightly convex between the eyes. The dorsal fin is straight or nearly concave.

In some populations, the dorsal and caudal fins have a dusky edge. Breeding males have a faint yellowish brown stripe along the side. Young striped jumprocks have 4 or 5 blotches along the side and a yellow caudal fin.

== Distribution and habitat ==
The fish is most often found in Georgia, North Carolina, and South Carolina. Specifically, in the drainages of the Santee River, the drainages of the Altahama River, and the upper Chattahoochee River drainages. It also seems to have been introduced into the Pee Dee River drainages of North Carolina.

The fish inhabits sandy to rocky riffles and runs of small or medium sized rivers.
