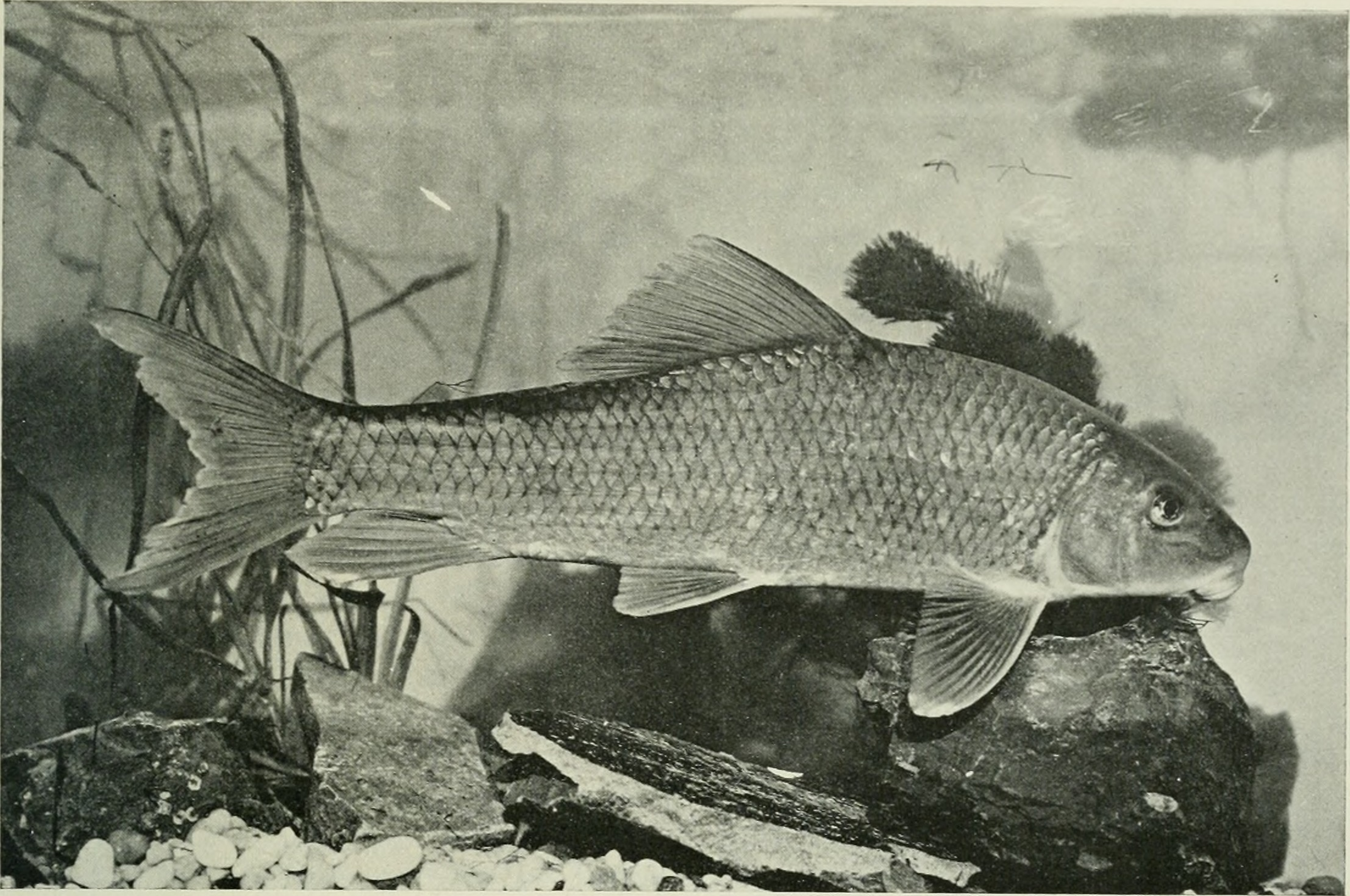

Conservation status
- Least Concern (IUCN 3.1)

Scientific classification
- Kingdom: Animalia
- Phylum: Chordata
- Class: Actinopterygii
- Order: Cypriniformes
- Family: Catostomidae
- Genus: Moxostoma
- Species: M. pisolabrum

Binomial name
- Moxostoma pisolabrum Trautman & R. G. Martin, 1951

= Pealip redhorse =

Species of fish

The pealip redhorse (Moxostoma pisolabrum) is a species of ray-finned fish in the genus Moxostoma.
