= Greater jumprock =

Conservation status
- Least Concern (IUCN 3.1)

Scientific classification
- Kingdom: Animalia
- Phylum: Chordata
- Class: Actinopterygii
- Order: Cypriniformes
- Family: Catostomidae
- Genus: Moxostoma
- Species: M. lachneri

Binomial name
- Moxostoma lachneri C. R. Robins & Raney, 1956

Synonyms
- Scartomyzon lachneri (Robins & Raney, 1956)

Species of fish

The greater jumprock (Moxostoma lachneri) is a riverine species of catostomid fish native to Georgia and Alabama in North America.

== Relationship with humans ==
The world record for greater jumprock stands at 0.57 kg (1 lb 4 oz) and is tied between two fish, both taken from the Flint River in Georgia, USA in 2012.
