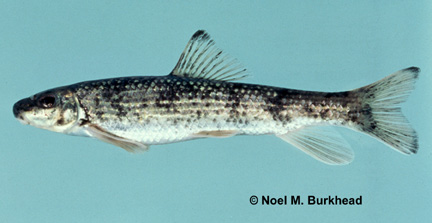

Conservation status
- Least Concern (IUCN 3.1)

Scientific classification
- Kingdom: Animalia
- Phylum: Chordata
- Class: Actinopterygii
- Order: Cypriniformes
- Family: Catostomidae
- Genus: Moxostoma
- Species: M. cervinum

Binomial name
- Moxostoma cervinum (Cope, 1868)
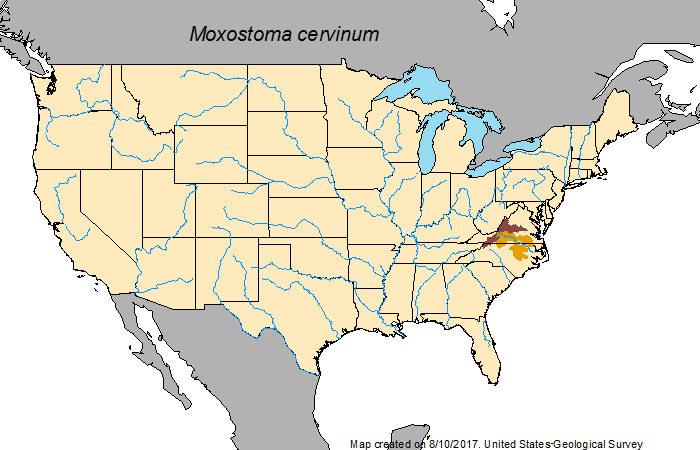
- Distribution of M. cervinum (USGS)

Synonyms
- Scartomyzon cervinus (Cope, 1868); Teretulus cervinus Cope, 1868

= Moxostoma cervinum =

Species of fish

Moxostoma cervinum (blacktip jumprock or black jumprock) is a species of ray-finned fish in the genus Moxostoma.

== Footnotes ==
- Froese, Rainer; Pauly, Daniel (eds.). "Moxostoma cervinum". FishBase.
