= Bigeye jumprock =

Conservation status
- Least Concern (IUCN 3.1)

Scientific classification
- Kingdom: Animalia
- Phylum: Chordata
- Class: Actinopterygii
- Order: Cypriniformes
- Family: Catostomidae
- Genus: Moxostoma
- Species: M. ariommum

Binomial name
- Moxostoma ariommum C. R. Robins & Raney, 1956

Synonyms
- Scartomyzon ariommus (C. R. Robins & Raney, 1956)

Species of fish

The bigeye jumprock (Moxostoma ariommum) is a species of ray-finned fish in the family Catostomidae. It is found only in the upper Roanoke River drainage in Virginia and North Carolina, United States. It inhabits deep rocky runs and pools with large boulders and rubble. It reaches a maximum length of around 22 cm.
