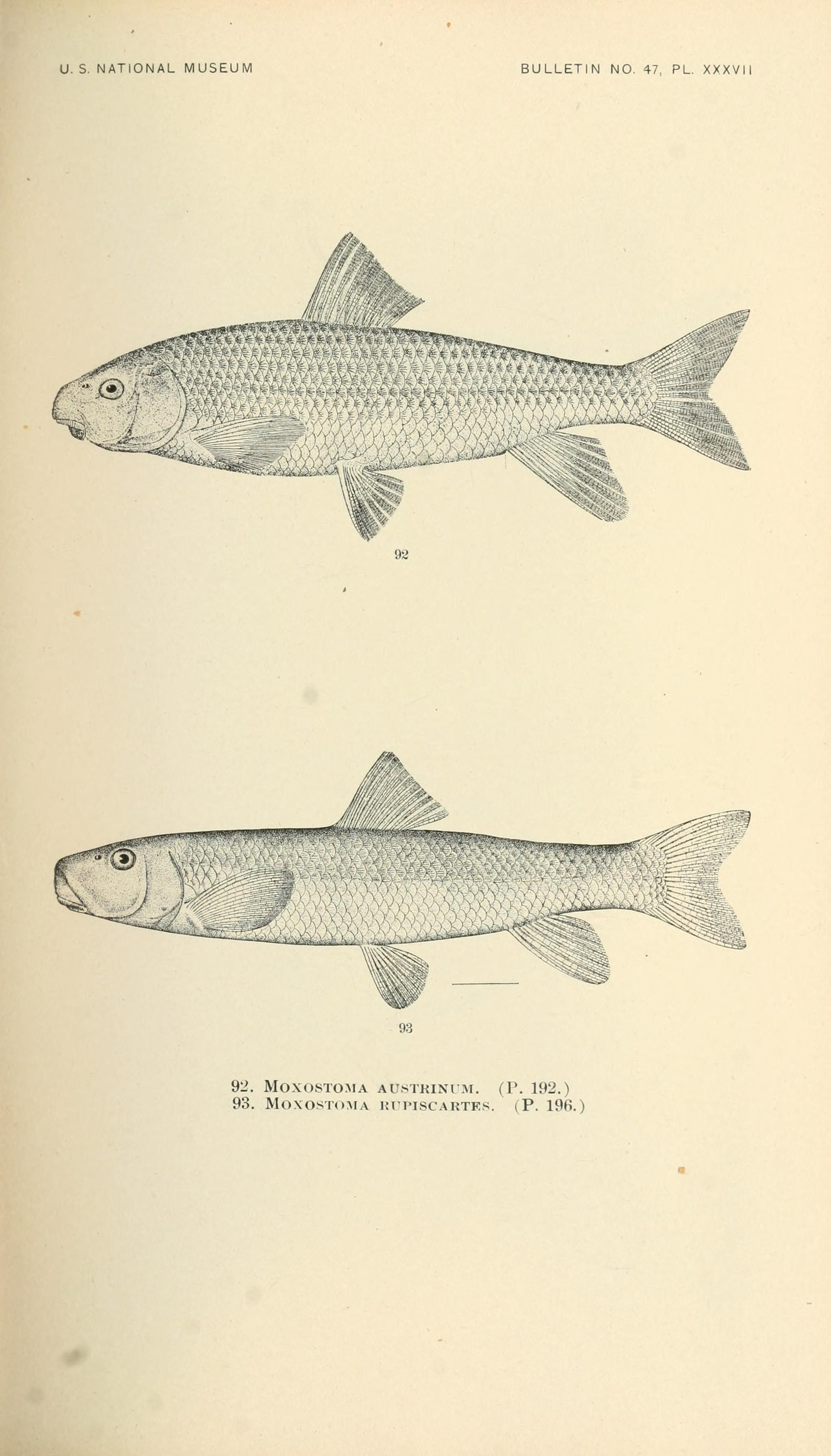
- top

Conservation status
- Data Deficient (IUCN 3.1)

Scientific classification
- Kingdom: Animalia
- Phylum: Chordata
- Class: Actinopterygii
- Order: Cypriniformes
- Family: Catostomidae
- Genus: Moxostoma
- Species: M. austrinum

Binomial name
- Moxostoma austrinum T. H. Bean, 1880

= Mexican redhorse =

Species of fish

The Mexican redhorse (Moxostoma austrinum) is a species of ray-finned fish in the genus Moxostoma. It can be found in the waters of the Sierra Madre Occidental mountains and the Rio Grande basin.

== Footnotes ==
- Froese, Rainer; Pauly, Daniel (eds.). "Moxostoma austrinum". FishBase.
