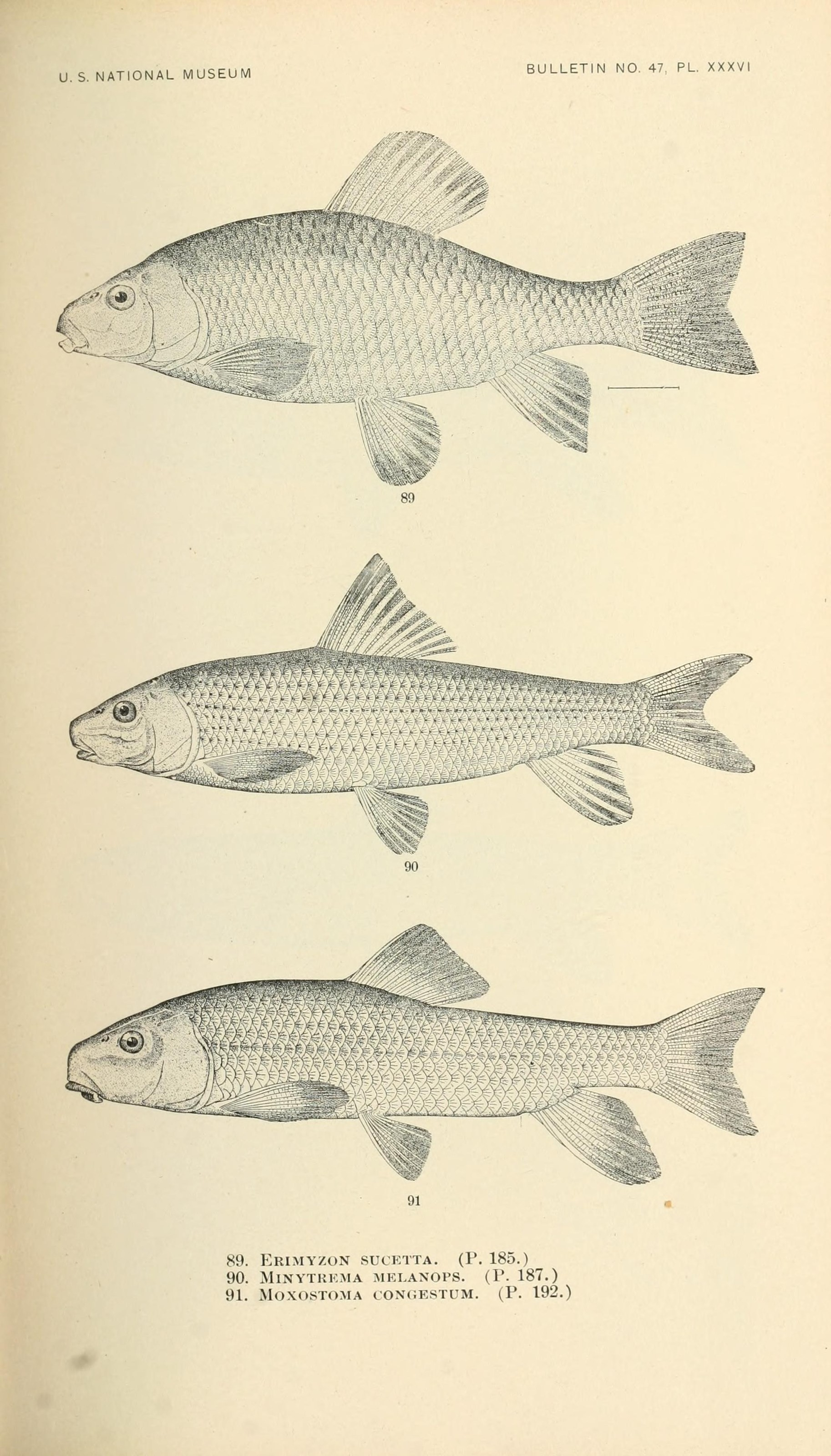
- Myxostoma congestum (bottom)

Conservation status
- Least Concern (IUCN 3.1)

Scientific classification
- Kingdom: Animalia
- Phylum: Chordata
- Class: Actinopterygii
- Order: Cypriniformes
- Family: Catostomidae
- Genus: Moxostoma
- Species: M. congestum

Binomial name
- Moxostoma congestum (S. F. Baird & Girard, 1854)

Synonyms
- Catostomus congestus Baird & Girard, 1854

= Gray redhorse =

Species of fish

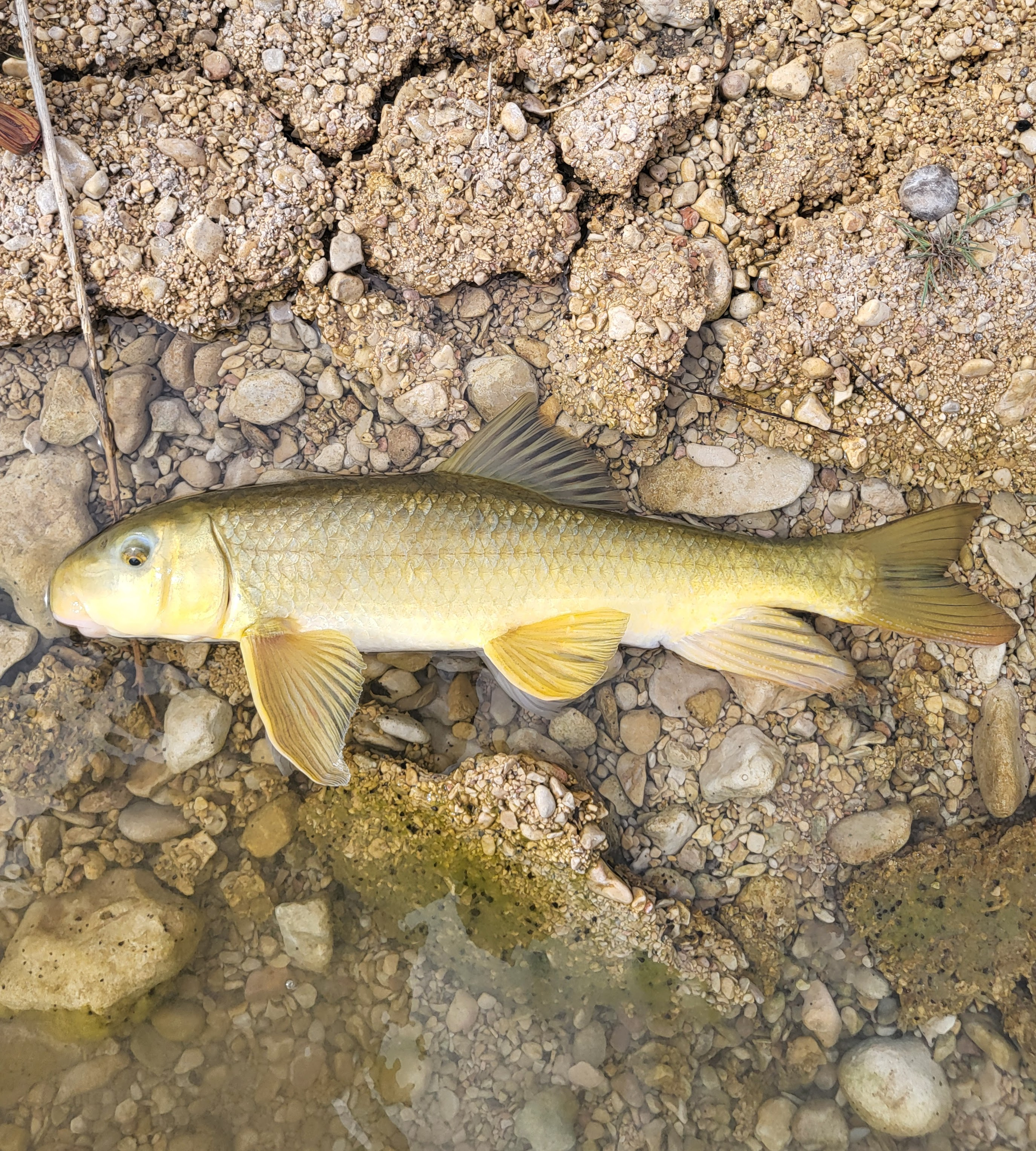
Gray Redhorse

The gray redhorse (Moxostoma congestum) is a species of freshwater fish in the family Catostomidae. It is found in Mexico and the United States.
