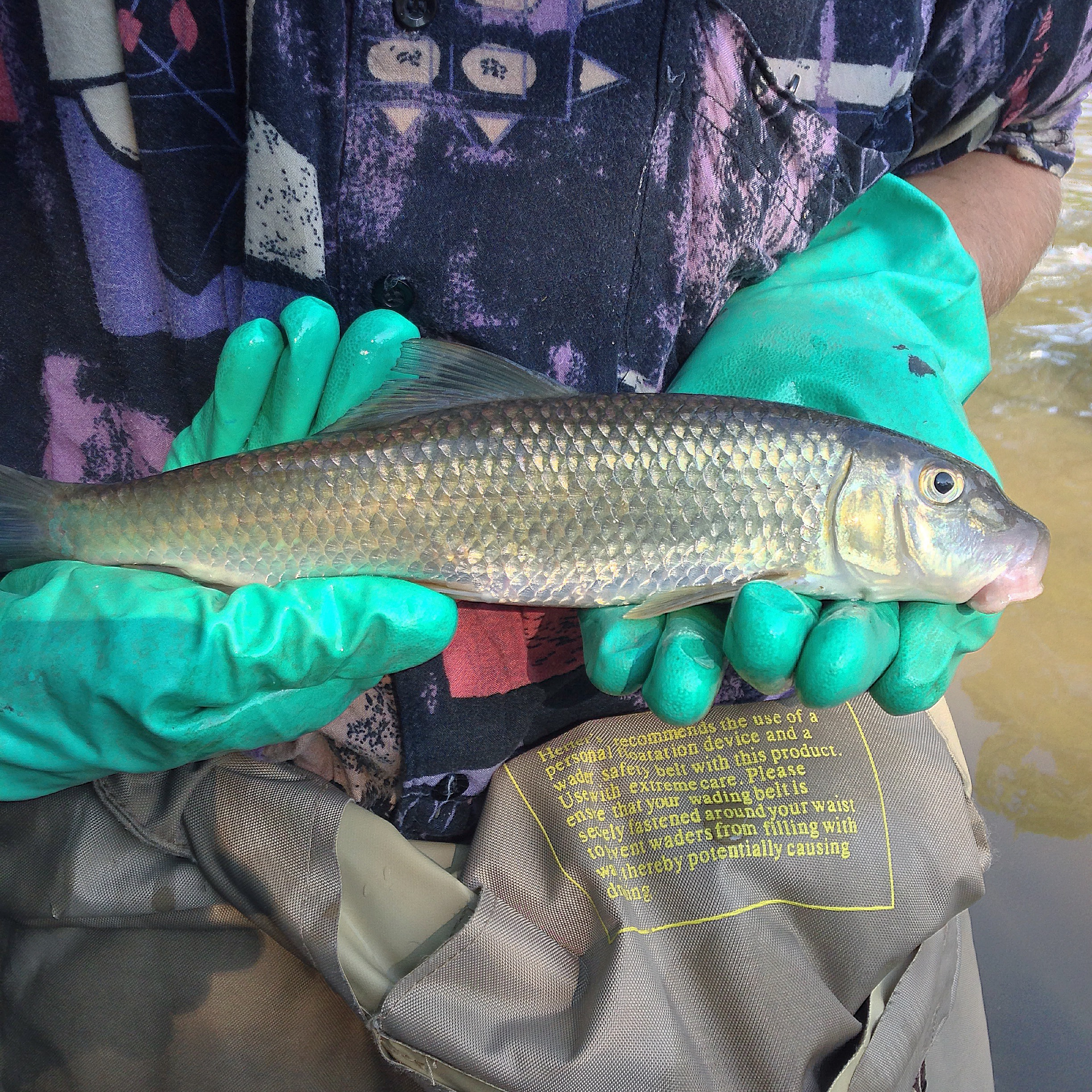
- Black redhorse in the Huron River, Ohio

Conservation status
- Least Concern (IUCN 3.1)

- Secure (NatureServe)

Scientific classification
- Kingdom: Animalia
- Phylum: Chordata
- Class: Actinopterygii
- Division: Teleostei
- Order: Cypriniformes
- Family: Catostomidae
- Genus: Moxostoma
- Species: M. duquesnei

Binomial name
- Moxostoma duquesnei (Lesueur, 1817)

Synonyms
- Catostomus duquesnii Lesueur, 1817; Placopharynx duquesnii (Lesueur, 1817)

= Black redhorse =

Species of fish

The black redhorse (Moxostoma duquesnei, also duquesnii, duquesni) is a species of freshwater fish endemic to Ontario and the eastern half of the United States, where it lives in streams and small to medium rivers.

A bottom-feeder, it feeds on microcrustaceans, aquatic insects, detritus, and algae. The black redhorse spawns in the spring.

This species has been identified as Threatened by the Committee on the Status of Endangered Wildlife in Canada (COSEWIC). It is currently being considered for listing under the federal Species at Risk Act (SARA).

== Description ==
The black redhorse is a species of the sucker family, Catostomidae. It is laterally compressed and has a shallow body shape with little arching to the back. Nearly half of the head is a long, rounded snout. The mouth is on the underside of the snout and has a thick lower lip. The body is silvery-blue with a gray or brownish dorsal surface and silver or white belly. Some of the scales have dark edges. During the breeding season males have dark stripes and orange or pink coloration along the flanks, and develop nuptial tubercles on the tail fins.

The black redhorse can be distinguished from similar species by the lack of red on the tail and the lack of grooving on the lips.

== Distribution ==
The black redhorse has a wide, but disjunct, distribution in eastern North America. It is found from Alabama and Mississippi in the south to Ontario and Michigan in the north, and from New York in the east to Oklahoma and Minnesota in the west. In Canada, it is limited to southwestern Ontario where it occurs in only six watersheds. In the Lake Huron drainage, it is found in the Bayfield River, Maitland River and Ausable River watersheds. In the Lake Erie drainage, it is known from the Catfish Creek (extirpated) and Grand River watersheds. It is also present in the Thames River watershed in the Lake St. Clair drainage.

== Habitat and life history ==
The black redhorse usually lives in moderately sized rivers and streams, 25 to 130 m (82 to 427 ft) wide, up to 1.8 m (5 ft 11 in) in depth, and with generally moderate to fast currents. It is rarely found associated with aquatic vegetation. Substrates include rubble, gravel, sand, boulders and silt. In summer, they generally prefer pools and overwinter in deeper pools. In the spring, black redhorse migrate to spawning habitats. Spring spawning has been observed in riffle habitats at water temperatures between 15 and 21 °C (59 and 70 °F), and over a variety of substrates from fine gravel to large cobble. Eggs are nonadhesive and range in size from 2.6 to 2.9 mm (3/32 to 1/8 in). The age at maturity is between two and six years. Lifespan increases with latitude and some individuals reach 16 years of age.

== Diet ==
Adult black redhorse are bottom feeders and eat crustaceans and insects. The younger fish (less than 65 mm (2.6 in)) are thought to prefer plankton.

== Relationship with humans ==
Habitat may be altered or impaired through urbanization and agricultural activities that increase siltation, turbidity, and change flow regimes. The availability of suitable habitat limits the distribution of the black redhorse in Canada, rendering its distribution highly fragmented. Its restricted spawning habitat preferences make recruitment vulnerable to changes in flow regime. Dams and impoundment of riverine habitats also restrict movements of fish. Incidental catches of black redhorse by sport fishers have been reported and may impact populations. The IGFA world record for the species stands at 1.02 kg (2 lb 4 oz) caught from Franklin Creek in Franklin, Pennsylvania in 1998.
