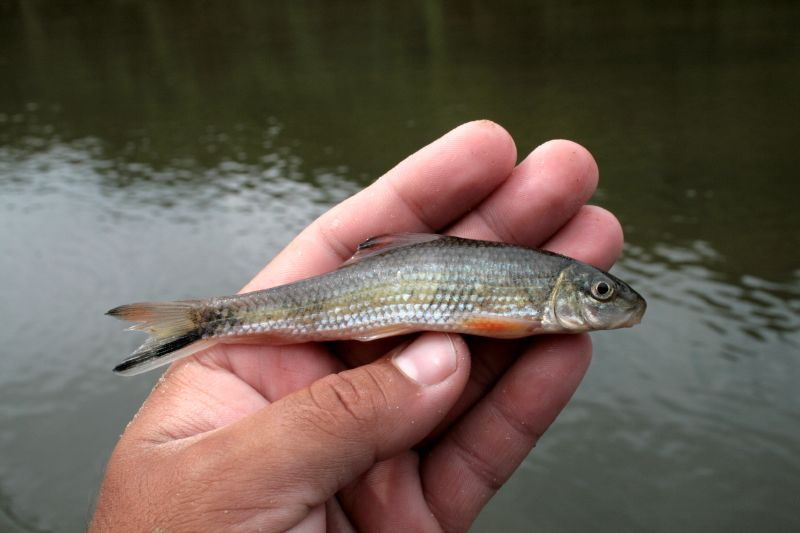

Conservation status
- Least Concern (IUCN 3.1)

Scientific classification
- Kingdom: Animalia
- Phylum: Chordata
- Class: Actinopterygii
- Order: Cypriniformes
- Family: Catostomidae
- Genus: Moxostoma
- Species: M. poecilurum

Binomial name
- Moxostoma poecilurum (D. S. Jordan, 1877)

= Blacktail redhorse =

Species of fish

The blacktail redhorse (Moxostoma poecilurum) is a species of ray-finned fish in the genus Moxostoma. The blacktail redhorse occupies North America, being located throughout Mississippi River tributaries on the former Mississippi Embayment, ranging from Southern Kentucky to Galveston Bay in Texas.

== Description ==
Like other Moxostoma, the blacktail redhorse has a long and cylindrical body. It is gold to bronze on the upper half with a silver-green iridescence, and is a silver yellow to white on the lower half. The caudal and lower fins are red, with a black stripe on the lower half of the forked caudal fin, which is normally larger than the upper half. The edge of the dorsal fin is usually concave, and the fin is a dusky grey on the lower half and more red on the upper half.

There are normally 41 to 44 lateral scales, and 12 to 13 dorsal rays.

The fish has a maximum total length of 51 cm (20 in), but is normally has a total length of 25 cm (10 in) to 41 cm (16 in).

== Distribution and habitat ==
Moxostoma poecilurum is found throughout Mississippi River tributaries on the former Mississippi Embayment running from Southern Kentucky to Southern Arkansas, south to Louisiana. It can also be found in gulf slope drainages from the Choctawhatchee River in Alabama and Florida to Galveston Bay in Texas. It is endemic to the Southeastern United States. The distribution has not been noticeably decreased for any reason, nor has the Blacktail Redhorse been extirpated from any particular location.

Moxostoma poecilurum is a demersal, temperate, freshwater fish, most commonly found in sandy and rocky pools, runs, and riffles of small to medium-sized streams and rivers. Due to their adaptive abilities and widespread distribution throughout the Southeast, they can sometimes also be found in reservoirs, swamps, and the Mobile Delta. They generally occur in swift to standing water over sand, silt, rock, or gravel substrates and around aquatic vegetation. It is a benthic feeder and has a relatively diverse diet ranging from detritus, diatoms, and a wide variety of small invertebrates including microcrustacea, rotifers and the larvae of many insects. A Louisiana State University study revealed a specific diet "primarily composed of chironomid (55%) and heptageniid larvae (17%)". Due to its relatively small size, the blacktail redhorse is a common prey species among many avian and mammalian predators.

== Life cycle ==
Blacktail redhorse spawn in rocky shoal areas of small streams from late April through early May, when water temperatures approach 20 degrees Celsius. They utilize an aggregation spawning technique in which 2–3 males swim around a female, spawning intermittently. The fertilized eggs are dimersal and nonadhesive and hatching occurs 6–8 days after fertilization. The larvae move off the bottom and into the water column roughly 6 days after hatching. Females reach maturity at roughly 3 years of age and have an average clutch size of 17,000 eggs. blacktail redhorse can reach lengths of up to 51 centimetres (20 in), and have a maximum lifespan of 10 years. During colder months of the year, mature individuals are known to display seasonal migration, moving downstream into deeper water.

== Relationship with humans ==
Currently, Moxostoma poecilurum is listed as threatened in Kentucky due to aquatic habitat degradation, siltation, and increased turbidity. While the most noticeable causes of the species, decline result from anthropogenic factors, some biological factors negatively impact the blacktail redhorse. While the fish commonly falls prey to avian and mammalian predators, it also deals with multiple parasites; Eocollis catostomi, Pellucidhaptor orthacis, and Pellucidhaptor pterigynus parasitize the blacktail redhorse throughout its native range. Overall, habit destruction is the leading cause for the decline of the species. Agriculture, road construction, urbanization, and quarrying increase siltation and turbidity, as well as create migration barriers, inhibiting reproduction and health of the species. That being said, places such as Big Thicket Biosphere Reserve (National Park) in Texas and Horseshoe Bend National Military Park in Alabama are protected areas, providing effective conservation habitat for the blacktail redhorse. The IGFA world record for blacktail redhorse stands at 0.68 kg (1 lb 8 oz) taken from the Tallapoosa River in Alabama in 2005.
