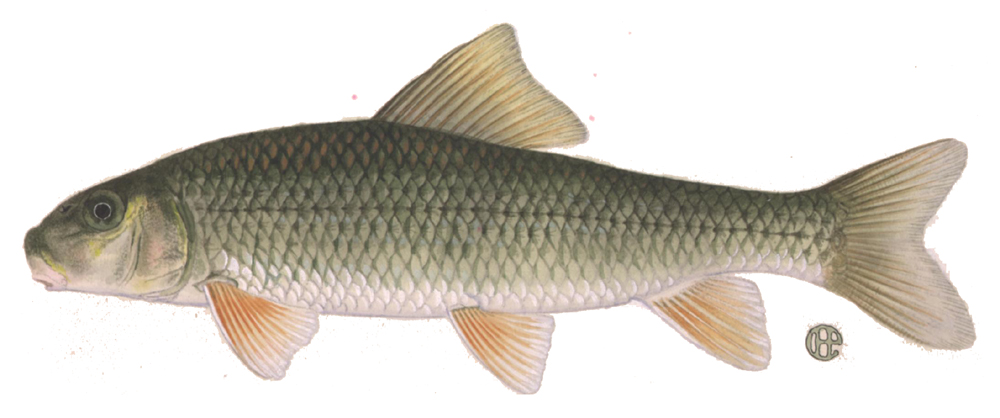
- Golden redhorse (Moxostoma erythrurum)

Conservation status
- Least Concern (IUCN 3.1)

Scientific classification
- Kingdom: Animalia
- Phylum: Chordata
- Class: Actinopterygii
- Division: Teleostei
- Order: Cypriniformes
- Family: Catostomidae
- Genus: Moxostoma
- Species: M. erythrurum

Binomial name
- Moxostoma erythrurum (Rafinesque, 1818)

Synonyms
- Catostomus erythrurus Rafinesque, 1818

= Golden redhorse =

Species of fish

The golden redhorse (Moxostoma erythrurum) is a species of freshwater fish endemic to Ontario and Manitoba in Canada and the Midwestern, southern, and eastern United States. It lives in calm, often silty or sandy waters in streams, small to large rivers, and lakes.

A bottom-feeder, it feeds on microcrustaceans, aquatic insects, detritus, algae, and small mollusks. The golden redhorse spawns in the spring.

== Geographic distribution ==
The golden redhorse can be found in freshwater habitats across 25 different states in the eastern half of North America. There are populations located in the drainage basins of the Mississippi River, Ohio River, and the lower Missouri River. The fish can also be found in the Great Lakes, excluding Lake Superior, and the Lakes' basin, as well as in the Lake of the Woods. The Mobile Bay drainage basin in the states of Alabama, Georgia, and southeastern Tennessee also contains the golden redhorse.

In Mississippi there is an isolated population in the southwestern part of the state. Some suspect that it is a relict population, meaning the range of the fish was once much larger than it is today. They were introduced into the Potomac River in Maryland, Virginia, and West Virginia, but the date of this introduction is unknown. A golden redhorse was seen in this river in 1953, but was never seen there again until 1971.

In Canada, the golden redhorse is endemic to Manitoba and Ontario. The fish can be found in the Red River of the North, a river which eventually empties into Hudson Bay. Coincidentally, the Red River in Texas also houses the golden redhorse.

== Physical characteristics ==
A Golden Redhorse caught and released in the Huron River of Southeast Michigan

Golden redhorses average around 12–18 inches (30–46 cm) long and weigh between 1–2 pounds (0.45–0.91 kg), although some can reach up to 26 inches (66 cm) and 4–5 pounds (1.8–2.3 kg). The golden scales decorating its sides gave the fish its name. They have olive colored backs, white bellies, and slate gray tail fins. Their body is fusiform in shape, allowing them to fight against currents in streams to capture their prey. The mouth of the fish is in the inferior position. The dorsal fin is slightly concave and the caudal fin is notched. It has a single anal fin and paired pelvic and pectoral fins. The pelvic fins are in the abdominal position, while the pectoral fins are located in more of a thoracic position. It has a lateral line system consisting of 39 to 42 scales which is used to detect movement and vibrations in the surrounding water.

== Habitat ==
Golden redhorses can be found in freshwater streams, creeks, and rivers with varied substrates. In pools they are generally found over sand and silt. Occasionally they have been seen living in lakes or larger reservoirs that are fed by a stream or river. Compared to other redhorse species the golden redhorse is not very sensitive to poor environmental conditions.

== Diet ==
The diet of the golden redhorse consists of a variety of small, aquatic creatures. They consume larval insects, small mollusks, microcrustaceans, and other aquatic invertebrates. Like most other members of the sucker family, Catostomidae, detritus and algae are also staples of the golden redhorse's diet. It is a bottom-feeding species that is able to use its protrusible mouth to suck up food objects from the stream bed.

== Reproduction and life cycle ==
The golden redhorse can live at least 17 years and becomes sexually mature at age 3–5. They spawn in the spring once water temperatures are between 17–22 °C. When this occurs depends on the geographic location, but spawning usually happens at night during April or May. Spawning most often occurs in a runs or riffles within the main stream, but some individuals may move into smaller, more well protected tributaries. The spawning streams are gravel bottomed, as their benthic, bottom-dwelling young prefer to hide beneath the stones after they hatch from their adhesive eggs.

Golden redhorses provide no parental care to their offspring. The young often form large schools and feed together along the stream bottom. Some schools may include a mixture of different redhorse species.

== Relationship with humans ==
The golden redhorse is a game fish, and is being increasingly pursued by rod-and-line anglers. The golden redhorse is also pursued by 21st century bowfishing that produces tons of wanton waste, where fish are targeted with bow and arrows at day or night in unregulated fashion. For example in Minnesota, 21st century bowfishing redhorse waste, exclusively from tournaments, exceeds that of statewide commercial harvest by more than 200 times. Modern regulation and management for species like golden redhorse are overdue. For indirect anglers on rod-and-line, the golden redhorse is often caught by accident when anglers fish on the bottom for catfish. Fishing for members of the sucker family usually occurs in the early spring when the water temperature reaches 42 °F (6 °C). Fishing several inches off the stream bottom with simple worms as bait is a good method to catch suckers. Gigging for suckers is another common practice. This is done using a multi-headed spear at night, often with a mounted light on the bow of the boat. The golden redhorse can be cooked, smoked or pickled. The IGFA record for the species stands at 4 pounds 1 ounce (1.8 kg) caught from French Creek in Franklin, Pennsylvania in 1997.
