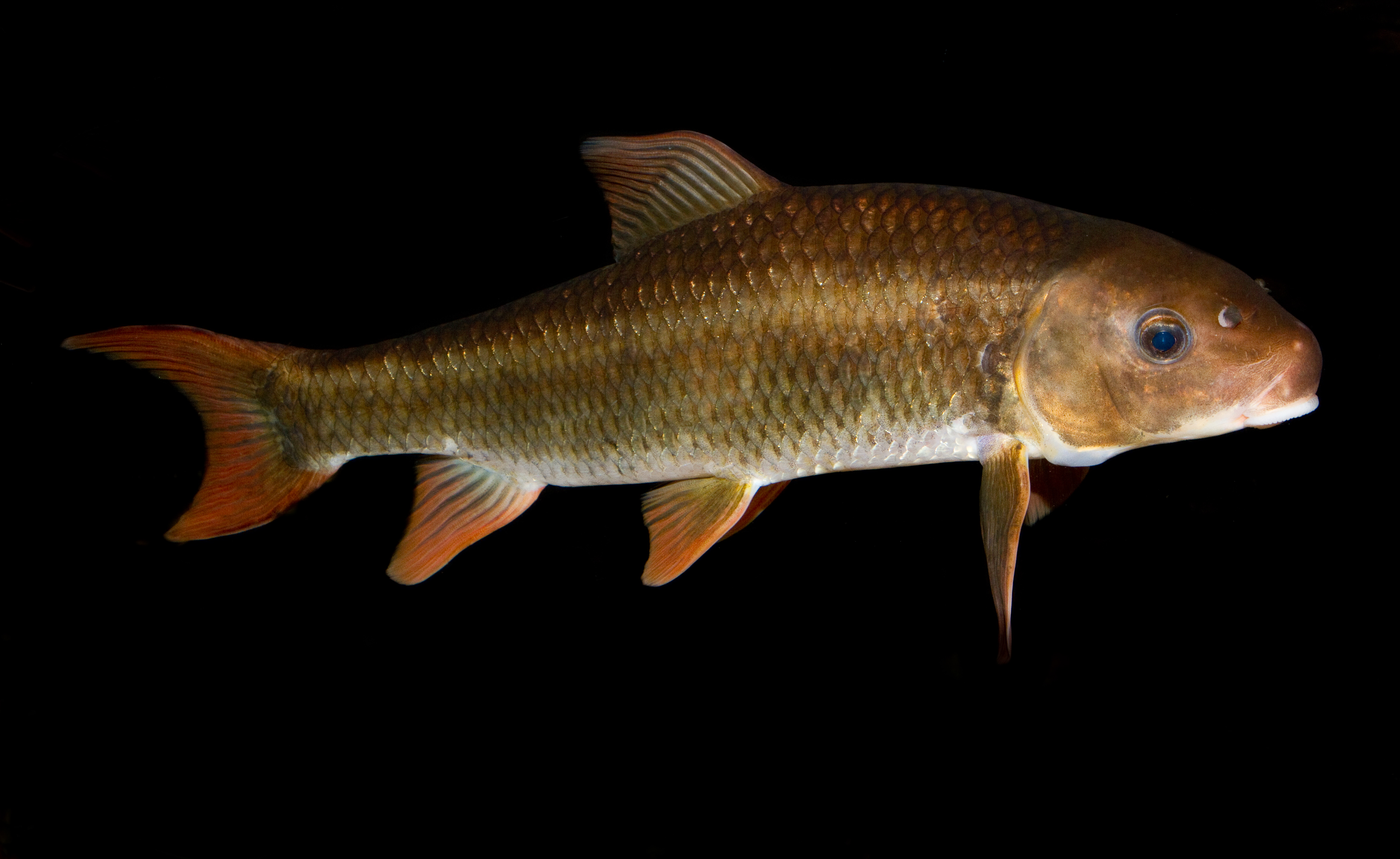

Conservation status
- Endangered (IUCN 3.1)

Scientific classification
- Kingdom: Animalia
- Phylum: Chordata
- Class: Actinopterygii
- Order: Cypriniformes
- Family: Catostomidae
- Genus: Moxostoma
- Species: M. robustum

Binomial name
- Moxostoma robustum (Cope, 1870)

Synonyms
- Ptychostomus robustus Cope, 1870; Scartomyzon robustus (Cope, 1870)

= Robust redhorse =

Species of fish

The robust redhorse (Moxostoma robustum) is a redhorse-type fish that lives in the freshwater streams of the eastern United States. It was previously called the smallfin redhorse.

== Taxonomy ==
Using a 6-pound (2.7 kg) specimen from the Yadkin River of North Carolina, naturalist Edward Drinker Cope first described the robust redhorse as Ptychostomus robustus in 1870. The original specimen was lost or destroyed, and by the late 19th century, all mention of the robust redhorse had ceased. It was thought to be extinct until several unidentified fish specimens were collected from the Savannah River and Pee Dee River in 1980 and 1985. In August 1991, biologists with the Georgia Department of Natural Resources officially rediscovered the species when five specimens of the fish were collected in the Oconee River, and identified as robust redhorse.

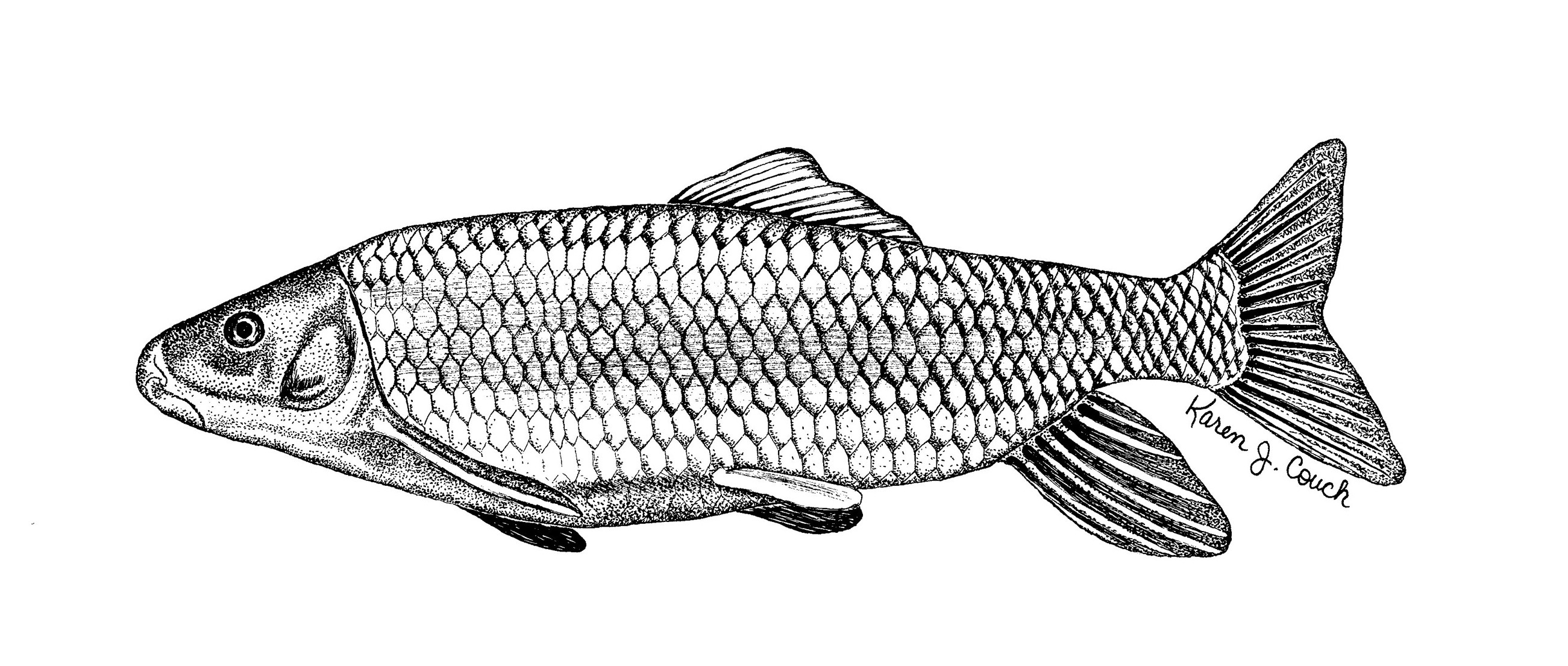
A drawing of a male robust redhorse.

== Description ==
M. robustum is a large, fairly long-living animal compared to other members of its family; the fish can weigh up to 17 pounds (7.7 kg) and live for up to 27 years, although it averages 25 inches (64 cm) in length and 9 pounds (4.1 kg) in weight. M. robustum's body is thick, or "robust", its fins are rose-colored, and it has a fleshy lower lip.

== Distribution and habitat ==
M. robustum is found in the eastern United States from the Cape Fear River drainage in North Carolina's Peedee River drainage, south to the Oconee River system, part of Georgia's Altamaha River drainage. They live in both rocky and silty pools or less turbulent areas of small and medium rivers, and are also found in reservoirs and other water impoundments.
