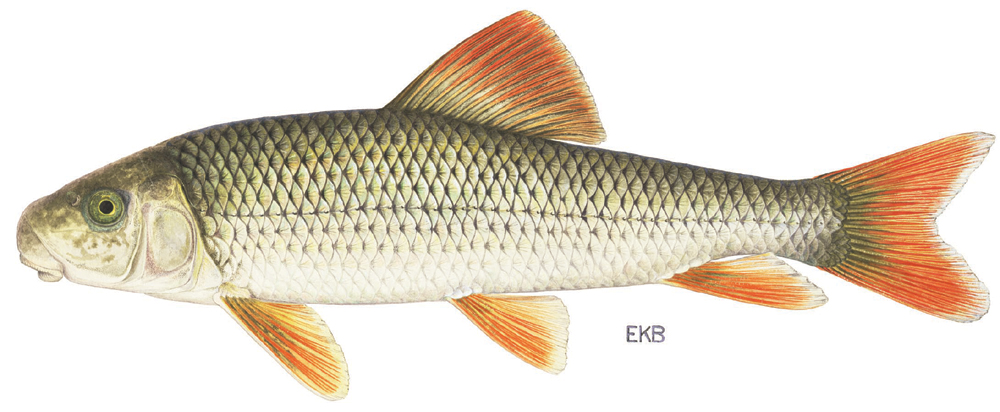
- Greater Redhorse (Moxostoma valenciennesi)

Conservation status
- Least Concern (IUCN 3.1)

Scientific classification
- Kingdom: Animalia
- Phylum: Chordata
- Class: Actinopterygii
- Order: Cypriniformes
- Family: Catostomidae
- Genus: Moxostoma
- Species: M. valenciennesi

Binomial name
- Moxostoma valenciennesi (D. S. Jordan, 1885)

Synonyms
- Moxostoma rubreques Hubbs, 1930

= Greater redhorse =

Species of freshwater fish found in northeastern North America

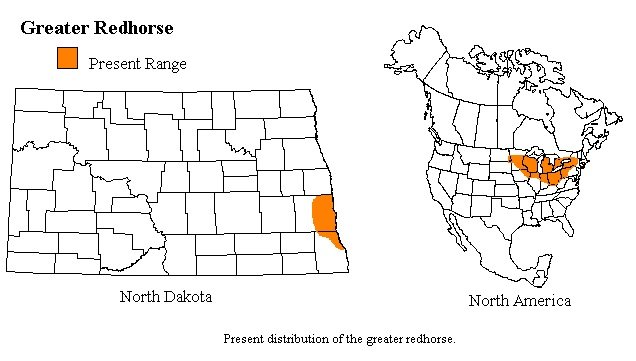
Distribution of Greater Redhorse.

The greater redhorse (Moxostoma valenciennesi) is a species of freshwater fish found in northeastern North America. It is the largest member of the genus Moxostoma, with a maximum length of 80 cm (31.5 in). The greater redhorse is long lived with a maximum reported age of 27 years.

== Distribution and habitat ==
The greater redhorse is endemic to states in the northcentral and northeastern United States as well as Ontario and Quebec in Canada. It is typically found in clear, relatively fast-moving rivers and in both shallow and deep waters in some lakes. They are unable to survive in even the slightest polluted waters. They, therefore have the ability to detect contaminated water sources.

== Description ==
The greater redhorse is the largest fish in its genus, averaging around 46 cm (18 in) and 2 kg (4.4 lb), and reaching a maximum size of 80 cm (31 in) and 5.9 kg (13 lb). This species of fish has small eye sockets in contrast to their large rounded skull. On either side of the greater redhorse's body are reddish gold pectoral fins and pelvic fins. The posterior part of the dorsal fin varies from slightly concave at youth to slightly convex in adulthood. Their tail fins are only slightly notched, a trait that usually evolved in slow swimming bottom-feeders. The greater redhorse is most easily identified by its bright rusty red colored tail fin and the rows of black spots along its sides and back.

== Diet habits ==
A bottom-feeder's mouth opens in the inferior position of the ventral surface of the fish. It feeds on various bottom dwelling organisms including, microcrustaceans, aquatic and larval insects, detritus, snails, and algae.

== Reproduction and life cycle ==
Spawning for the greater redhorse begins in May or June. Before they are able to build their gravel and sand nests, they locate an area in moderately fast waters. Once male territories are established, the females will visit two males at a time and begin their spawning process. The two males will surround the female and perform a shaking motion releasing both the sperm and eggs from said gendered fish. Upon burial of the eggs, the parents leave with no further parental care provided. Following fertilization, the greater redhorse eggs will hatch six to eight days at a mean temperature of 19 °C (66 °F). Growth rates of this species are controversial among various areas they inhabit. The greater redhorse takes several years to reach sexual maturity and frequently attain ages more than 20 years, making them one of the longer-lived redhorse species.

== Relationship with humans ==
Overall, the greater redhorse is being threatened across its range. Although once not a popular sporting fish, this long-lived and late-maturing species is now subject to unregulated bowfishing, where tons of fish are shot for sport with no use of the fish afterwards and hauls exceed that of the commercial harvest by 200 times. Thus, the greater redhorse is in dire need of conservation and management, especially with respect to wanton waste of bowfishing. The greater redhorse's status as a prey species is integral to the ecosystems to which they are native. Because this species is impacted greatly by pollutants, their endangered status may come from a decreased conscientiousness of where wastes are disposed of. The IGFA world record for the species stands at 5.75 kg (12 lb 11 oz) caught from the Sauk River near Melrose, Minnesota in 2005. The greater redhorse is also being increasingly pursued by rod-and-line anglers of the 21st century.
