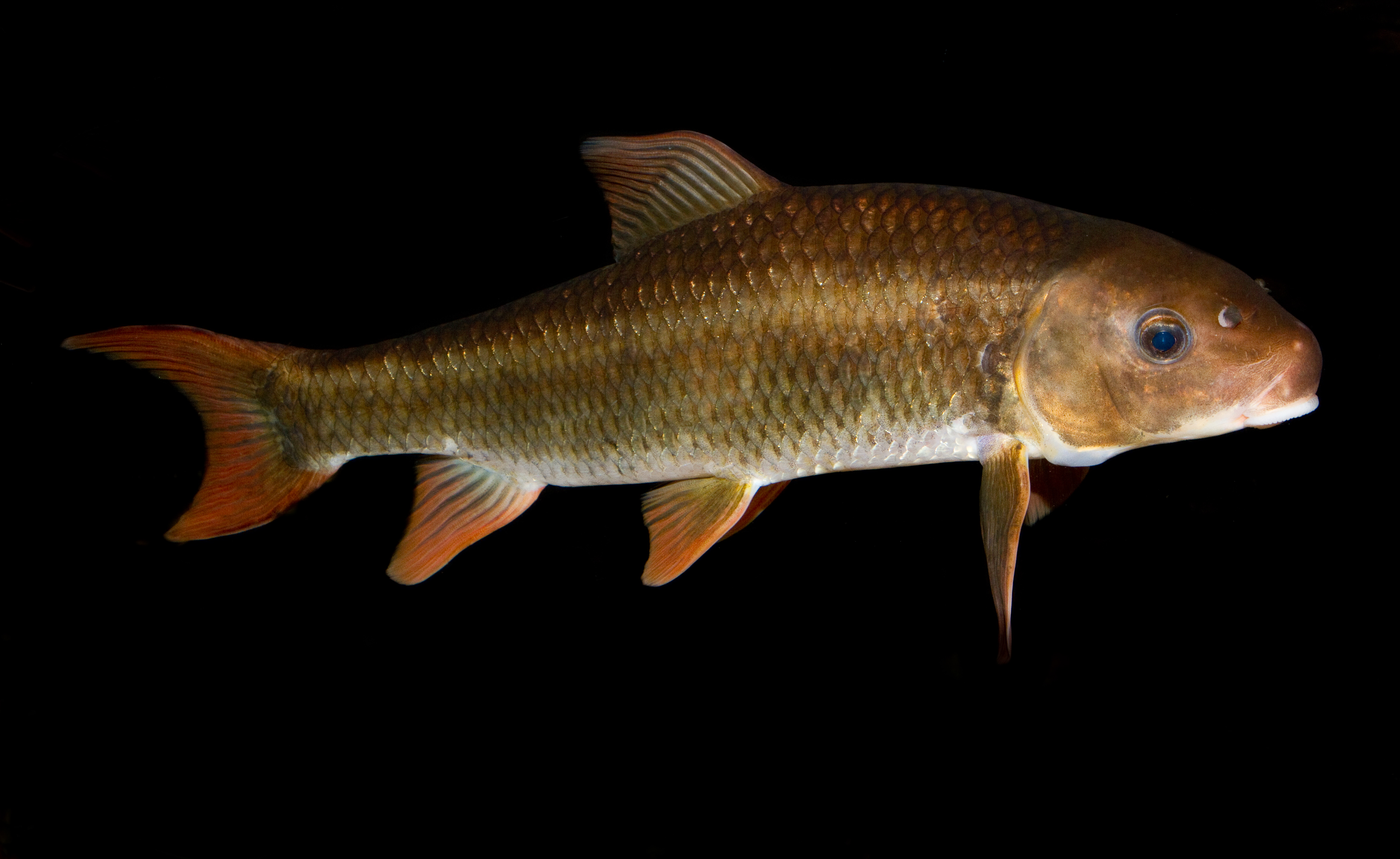
- Robust redhorse (M. robustum)

Scientific classification
- Kingdom: Animalia
- Phylum: Chordata
- Class: Actinopterygii
- Order: Cypriniformes
- Suborder: Catostomoidei
- Family: Catostomidae
- Subfamily: Catostominae
- Genus: Moxostoma; Rafinesque, 1820

Type species
- Catostomus anisurus Rafinesque 1820

Species
- 26, see text.

Synonyms
- Lagochila D. S. Jordan & Brayton, 1877; Megapharynx Legendre, 1942; Placopharynx Cope, 1870; Ptychostomus Agassiz, 1855; Quassilabia D. S. Jordan & Brayton, 1878; Scartomyzon Fowler, 1913; Teretulus Rafinesque, 1820

= Moxostoma =

Genus of fishes

Moxostoma, the redhorses or jumprocks, is a genus of North American ray-finned fish in the family Catostomidae. Redhorses are variable in size, geographic location, and other ecological traits such as spawning substrate. Several redhorses are long-lived (lifespans greater than 20 years), much like many other catostomid species. The silver redhorse is the longest-lived redhorse known by nearly a decade, with ages exceeding 40 years. Redhorses are broadly of conservation concern, as these long-lived species are highly intolerant to environmental pollution, habitat fragmentation, and are currently subject to unregulated 21st century sport bowfishing which is removing and wantonly wasting several of these species by the ton.

== Species ==
The following 26 species are recognized in this genus:

- Moxostoma albidum (Girard, 1856) (Longlip jumprock)
- Moxostoma anisurum (Rafinesque, 1820) (Silver redhorse)
- Moxostoma antelunare Akin, Jenkins & Armbruster, 2025
- Moxostoma ariommum C. R. Robins & Raney, 1956 (Bigeye jumprock)
- Moxostoma austrinum T. H. Bean, 1880 (Mexican redhorse)
- Moxostoma breviceps (Cope, 1870) (Smallmouth redhorse)
- Moxostoma carinatum (Cope, 1870) (River redhorse)
- Moxostoma carolina Hogue, Tracy, Hughes & Jenkins, 2026 (Carolina redhorse)
- Moxostoma cervinum ([Cope, 1868) (Blacktip jumprock)
- Moxostoma collapsum (Cope, 1870) (Notchlip redhorse)
- Moxostoma congestum (S. F. Baird & Girard, 1854) (Gray redhorse)
- Moxostoma duquesni (Lesueur, 1817) (Black redhorse)
- Moxostoma erythrurum (Rafinesque, 1818) (Golden redhorse)
- Moxostoma hubbsi V. Legendre, 1952 (Copper redhorse)
- †Moxostoma lacerum (D. S. Jordan & Brayton, 1877) (Harelip sucker)
- Moxostoma lachneri C. R. Robins & Raney, 1956 (Greater jumprock)
- Moxostoma macrolepidotum (Lesueur, 1817) (Shorthead redhorse)
- Moxostoma mascotae Regan, 1907 (Mascota jumprock)
- Moxostoma milleri C. R. Robins & Raney, 1957
- Moxostoma pappillosum (Cope, 1870) (V-lip redhorse)
- Moxostoma pisolabrum Trautman & R. G. Martin, 1951 (Pealip redhorse)
- Moxostoma poecilurum (D. S. Jordan, 1877) (Blacktail redhorse)
- Moxostoma robustum (Cope, 1870) (Robust redhorse)
- Moxostoma rupiscartes D. S. Jordan & O. P. Jenkins, 1889 (Striped jumprock)
- Moxostoma ugidatli Jenkins, Favrot, Freeman, Albanese & Ambruster, 2025 (Sicklefin redhorse)
- Moxostoma valenciennesi D. S. Jordan, 1885 (Greater redhorse)

Additionally, one undescribed species is thought to belong to this genus:

- Moxostoma sp. "Brassy" Undescribed, (Brassy Jumprock)
