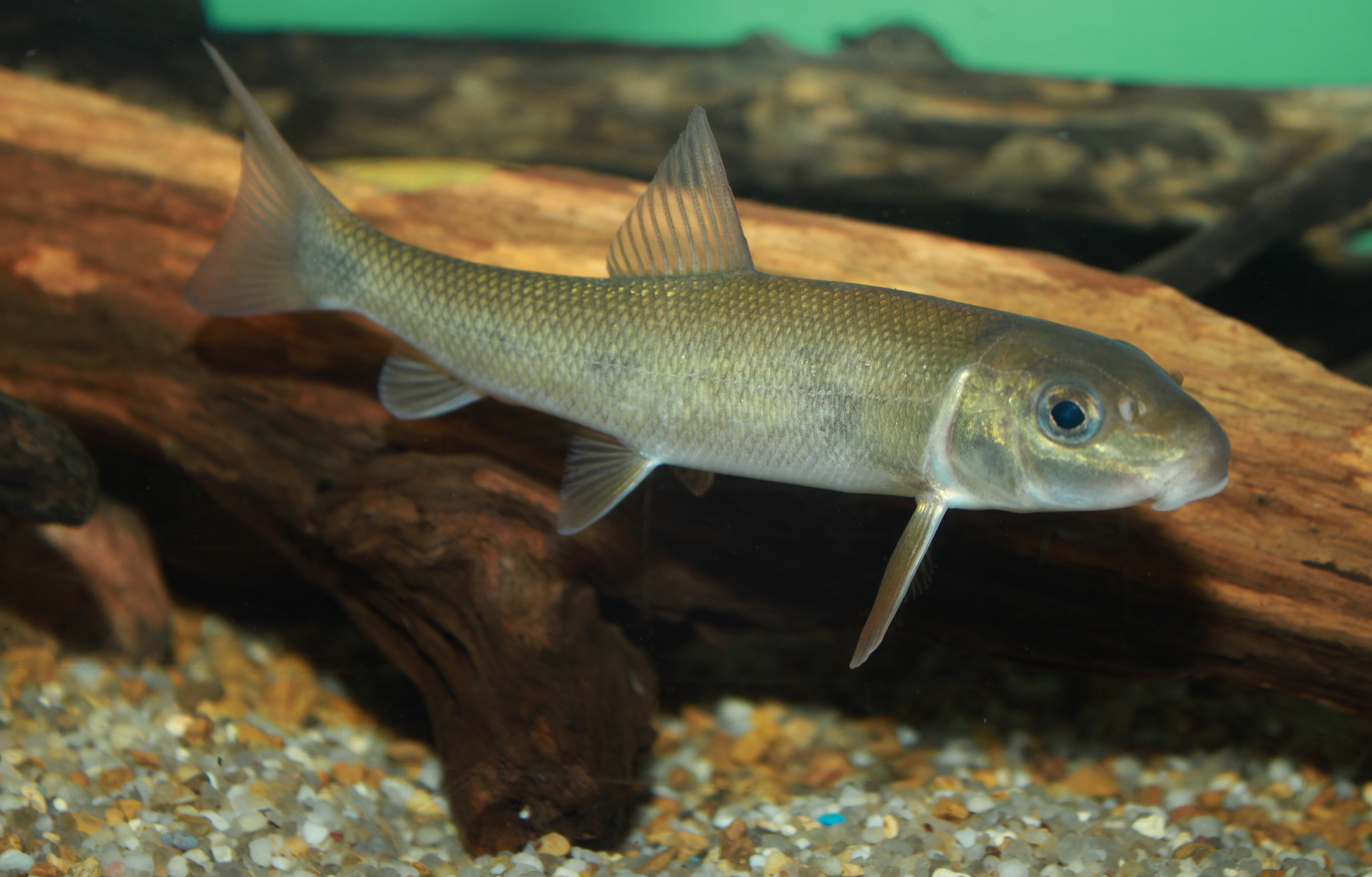
- White sucker, Catostomus commersonii

Scientific classification
- Kingdom: Animalia
- Phylum: Chordata
- Class: Actinopterygii
- Division: Teleostei
- Order: Cypriniformes
- Suborder: Catostomoidei; Betancur-R, et al., 2017
- Family: Catostomidae; Agassiz, 1850

Genera
- See text

= Catostomidae =

Catostomidae Temporal range: Middle Eocene–recent

Family of fishes

The Catostomidae are the suckers of the order Cypriniformes, with about 78 species in this family of freshwater fishes. The Catostomidae are almost exclusively native to North America. The only exceptions are Catostomus catostomus, found in both North America and Russia, and Myxocyprinus asiaticus found only in China. In the Ozarks they are a common food fish and a festival is held each year to celebrate them. The bigmouth buffalo, Ictiobus cyprinellus, can reach an age up to 127 years, making it the oldest known freshwater teleost by more than 50 years.

== Description and biology ==
The mouths of these fish are most commonly located on the underside of their head (subterminal), with thick, fleshy lips. Most species are less than 60 cm (2.0 ft) in length, but the largest species (Ictiobus and Myxocyprinus) can surpass 100 cm (3.3 ft). They are distinguished from related fish by having a long pharyngeal bone in the throat, containing a single row of teeth.

Catostomids are most often found in rivers, but can be found in any freshwater environment. Their food ranges from detritus and bottom-dwelling organisms (such as crustaceans and worms), to surface insects, crayfish, small terrestrial vertebrates, and other fish.

== Fossil record ==
Basal Catostomidae fossils have been uncovered and dated to the Middle Eocene in Colorado and Utah. The earliest catostomine sucker fossils are of Pantosteus from the Middle Miocene of Oregon.

== As food ==
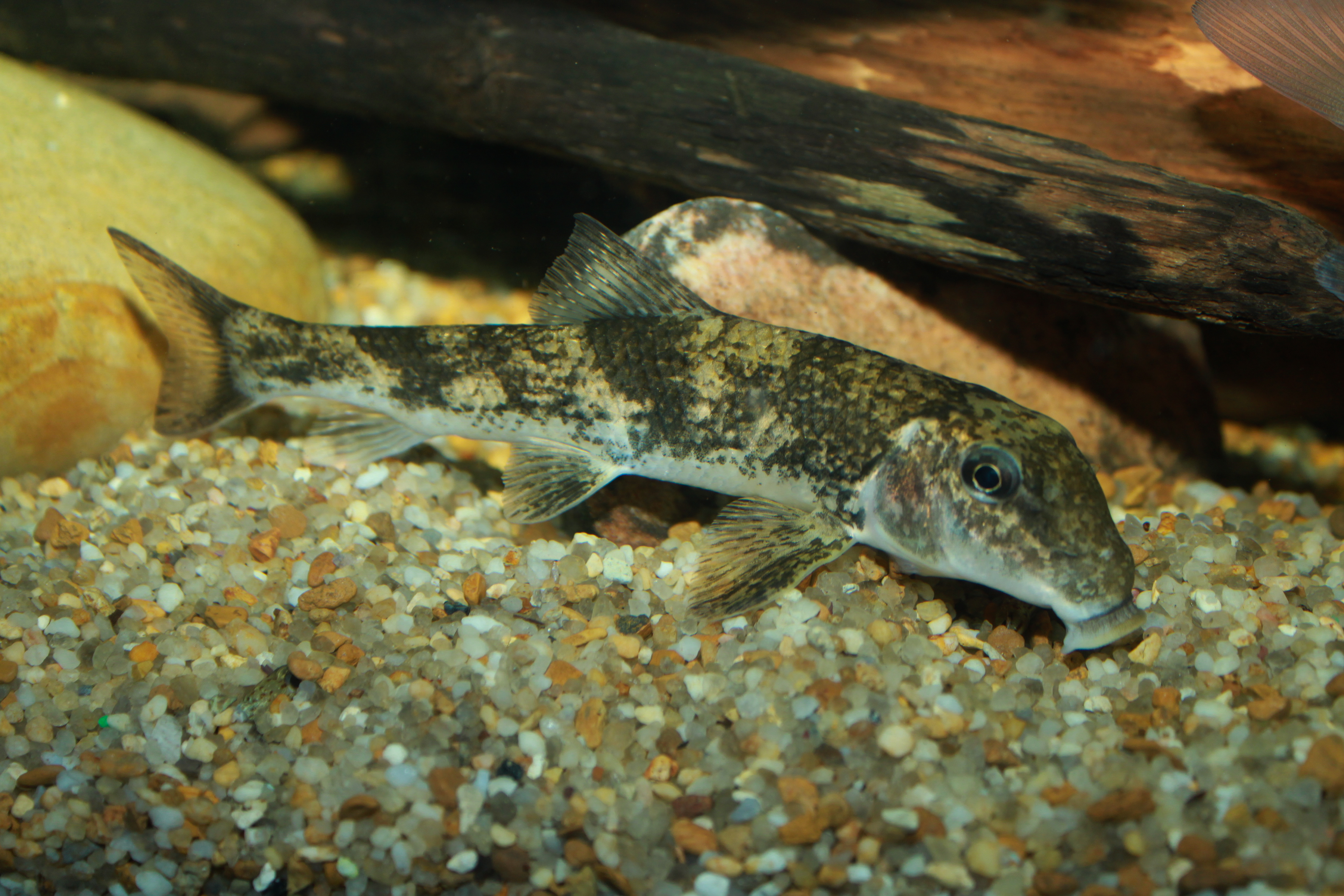
Northern hogsucker, Hypentelium nigricans

They can be taken by many fishing methods, including angling and gigging. Often, species such as Catostomus commersonii and Hypentelium nigricans are preferred for eating. They can be canned, smoked, or fried, but small incisions often must be made in the flesh (termed "scoring") before frying to allow small internal bones to be palatable. Suckers were an important source of food for Indigenous Americans across the continent. Many fishing methods were employed with the most elaborate being stone fish traps constructed on spawning rivers, remnants of these traps can be seen today in Ahjumawi Lava Springs State Park where the Achomawi people trapped Sacramento suckers. In the west these relationships became even more important after the decline in salmon runs due to damming and habitat destruction, some groups of native people relied on seasonal sucker runs for a significant amount of their food until the 1950s.

In China there is a significant aquaculture industry dedicated to raising Myxocyprinus asiaticus for food. Historically they were an important component of wild fisheries on the Yangtze, but the wild populations are under pressure from pollution, habitat destruction and hydroelectric dam projects.

== Recreational fishing ==
Some Catostomidae, especially those of Ictiobus and Moxostoma, are the subject of major recreational fisheries while most are the subject of at least limited recreational fisheries. Throughout much of their range species are considered to be rough fish. Suckers have historically been scapegoated for human environmental destruction and their impacts on popular fish species such as Pacific salmon and smallmouth bass. This has led to their widespread and unnecessary destruction at the hands of ignorant anglers.

== Subfamilies and genera ==
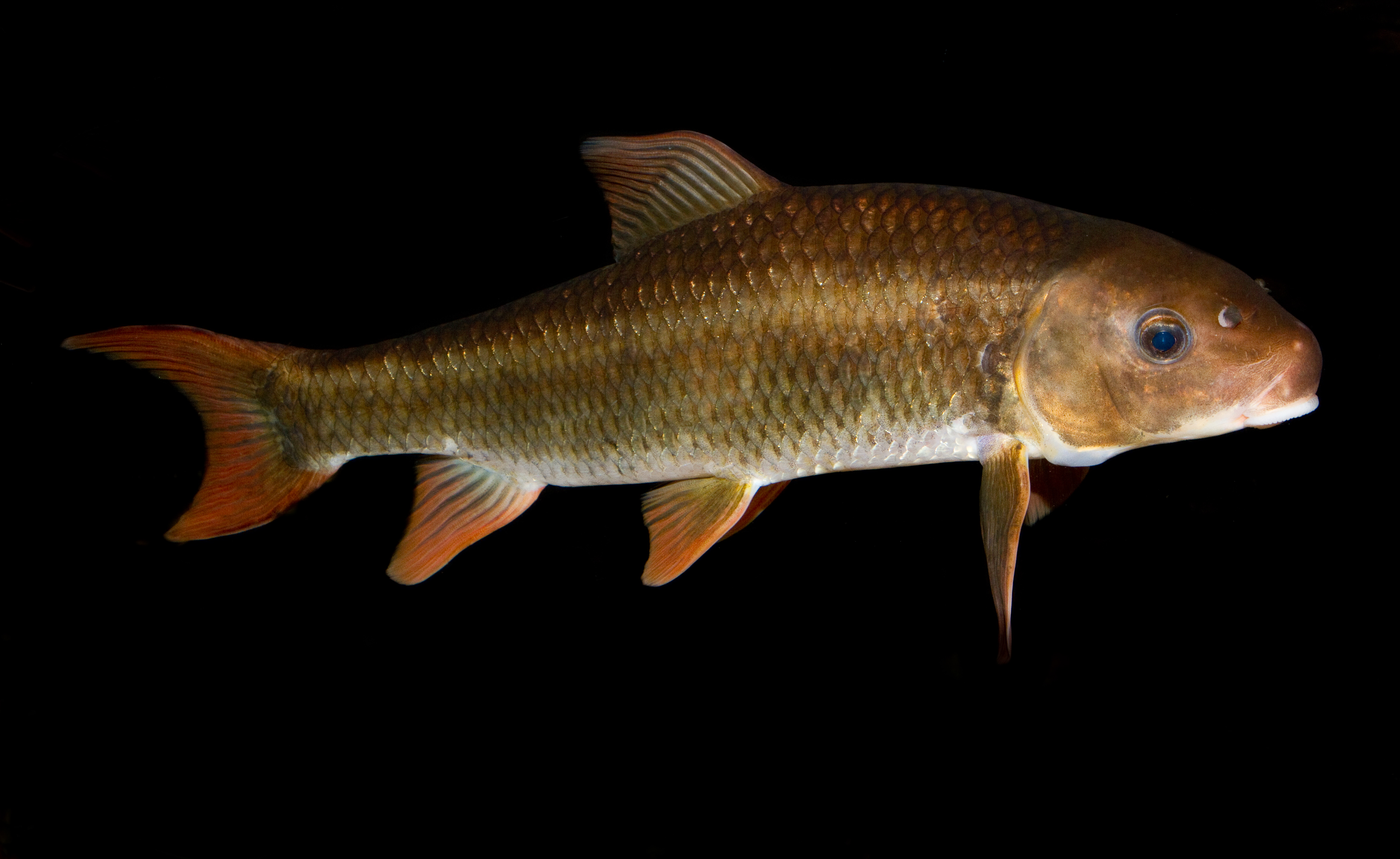
Smallfin redhorse, Moxostoma robustum

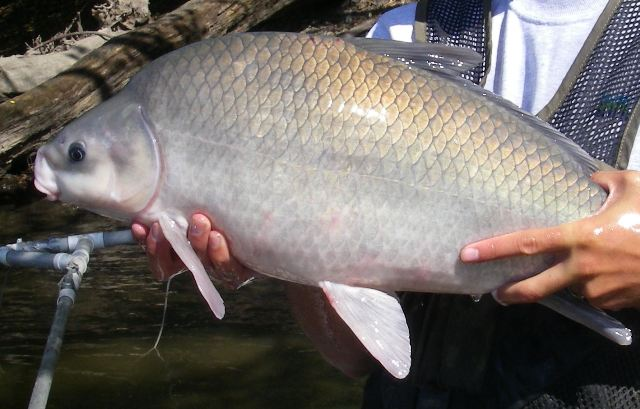
Smallmouth buffalo, Ictiobus bubalus

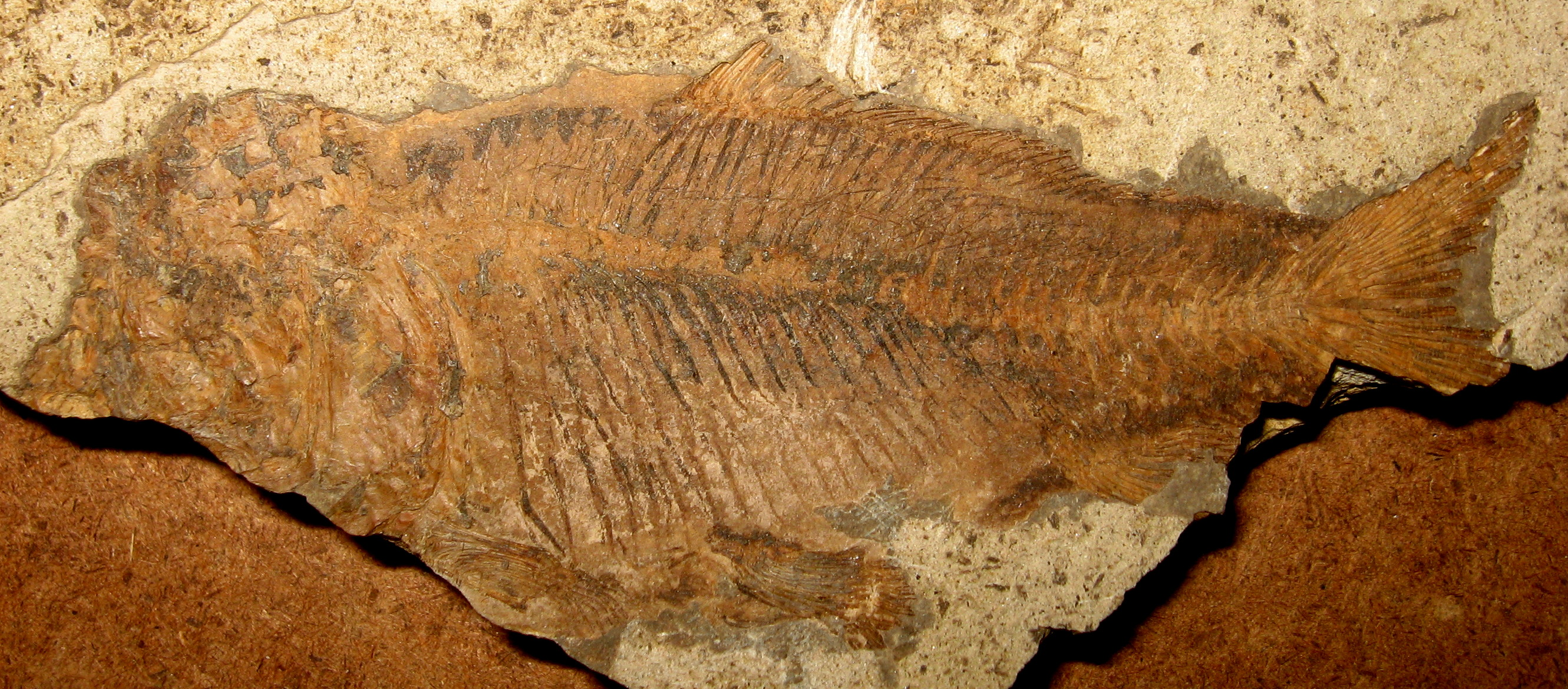
Amyzon aggregatum fossil specimen

Catostomidae is classified into the following subfamilies and genera:

- Subfamily Catostominae Agassiz, 1850
  - Genus Catostomus Lesueur, 1817
  - Genus Chasmistes D. S. Jordan, 1878
  - Genus Deltistes Seale, 1896
  - Genus Erimyzon D. S. Jordan, 1876
  - Genus Hypentelium Rafinesque, 1818
  - Genus Minytrema D. S. Jordan, 1878
  - Genus Moxostoma Rafinesque, 1820
  - Genus Pantosteus Cope, 1875
  - Genus Thoburnia D. S. Jordan & Snyder, 1917
  - Genus Vexillichthys Armbruster, 2024
  - Genus Xyrauchen C. H. Eigenmann & Kirsch, 1889
- Subfamily Cycleptinae Gill, 1861
  - Genus Cycleptus Rafinesque, 1819
- Subfamily Ictiobinae Bleeker, 1863
  - Genus Carpiodes Rafinesque, 1820
  - Genus Ictiobus Rafinesque, 1820
- Subfamily Myxocyprininae Fowler, 1958
  - Genus Myxocyprinus Gill, 1877
- other extinct genera
  - Genus †Amyzon Cope, 1872
  - Genus †Plesiomyxocyprinus Liu & Chang, 2009
  - Genus †Vasnetzovia Sytchevskaya, 1986
  - Genus †Wilsonium Liu, 2021

The fossil genus Jianghanichthys was previously placed in the Catastomidae, but is now placed in its own family, Jianghanichthyidae.
