= Bowfishing =

Fishing with archery equipment

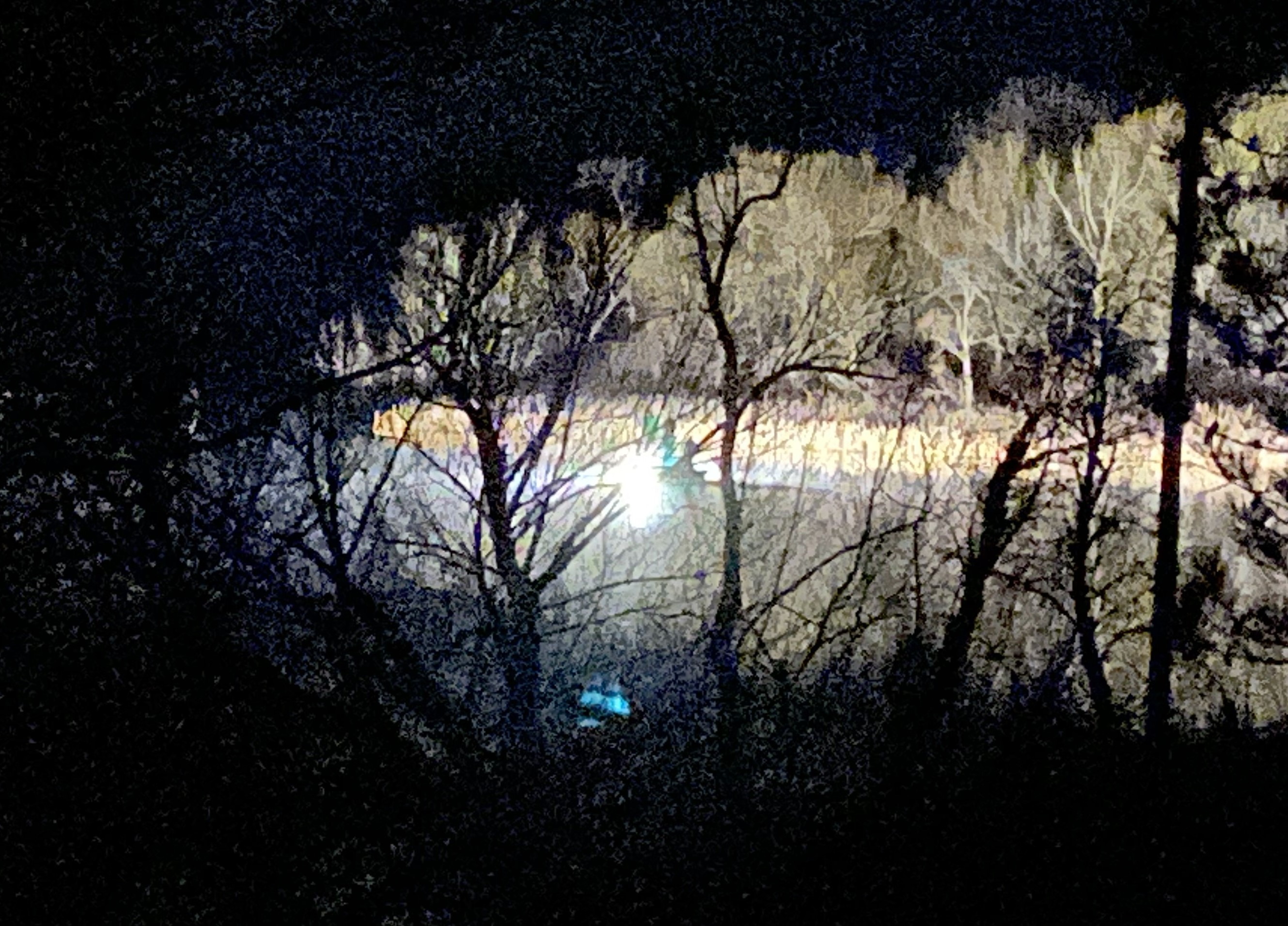
Modern sport bowfishing often occurs at night, shown here on a specialized boat: raised bow platform with powerful floodlights to expose and attract fish during the placid condition of night, often with several bowfishers covering different sectors.

Bowfishing is a fishing technique that uses specialized archery equipment to impale and retrieve fish. A bowfisher will use a bow or crossbow to shoot fish through the water surface with a barbed arrow tethered to a line, and then manually retrieve the line and arrow back, in modern times usually with a reel mounted on the bow. Unlike other popular forms of fishing where baiting and exploiting the fish's instinctual behaviors are important (e.g. angling, netting, trapping, and hand fishing such as noodling), bowfishing is similar to spearfishing and relies purely on the fisherman's own visual perception and marksmanship, and usually do not involve using other tools such as hand net.

Historically, bowfishing was practiced for subsistence, but in the 21st century it has increasingly become an outdoor sport, practiced across the United States, that is prone to unregulated waste and disposal of native species. Sport bowfishing is unregulated and unmanaged as of 2026, but the practice has increasingly gained attention and study across disciplines over the past decade. Due to the lethality of the bow or crossbow, catch and release is not possible with bowfishing.

== Equipment ==
=== Bows, arrows, line, reels ===
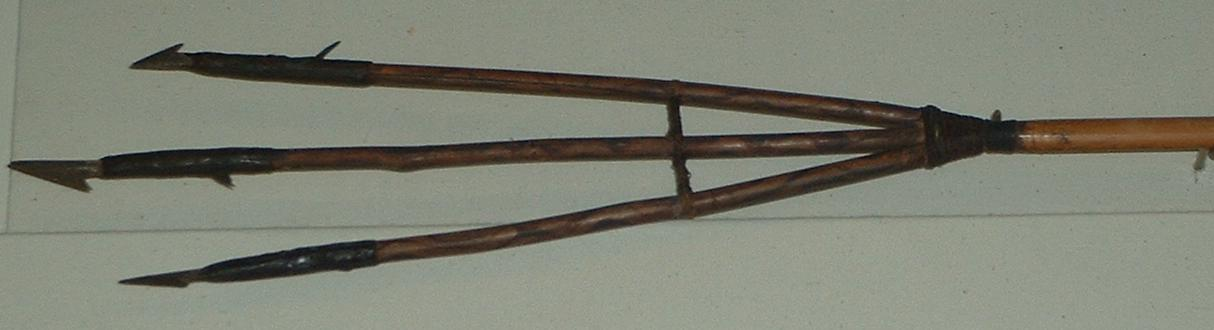
Historical arrow with three prongs carrying three barbed points. For catching fish in rivers for subsistence. From Guyana. Photographed at the Royal Albert Memorial Museum, Exeter, Devon.

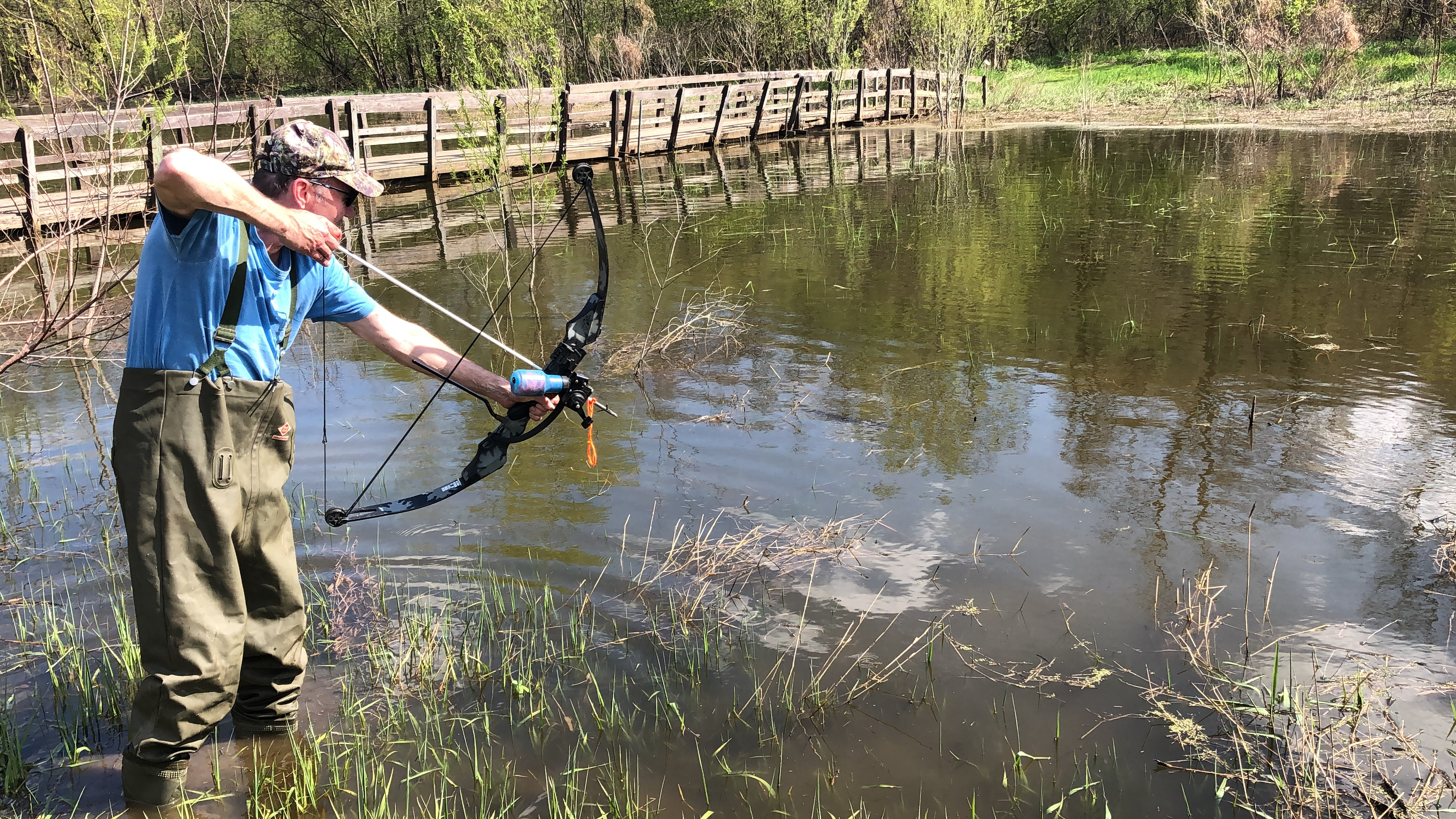
A modern bowfisher takes aim at spawning carp in an Iowa pond.

Traditionally, bows were usually very simple. Most did not have sights, and aiming was executed by line-of-sight judgment down the arrow. Modern sport bowfishing mostly uses sophisticated compound or lever-action bows, some of which are fitted with laser sights. There are a couple of types of rests including the hook-and-roller rest, and the full-containment rest (with Whisker Biscuit being the best-known brand of the latter). Most bowfishing bows have little to no let-off and are typically designed for 40–50 pounds (18–23 kg) of draw weight. Some other bows can have as much as 120-pound (54 kg) draw weight. The crossbow is also sometimes used in this manner and has its own advantages, including the use of a reel. See Recreational fishing.

Bowfishing arrows are considerably heavier and stronger than arrows used in other types of archery and are most commonly constructed of five-sixteenths-inch (0.79 cm) fiberglass, but solid aluminum, carbon fiber, and carbon fiber reinforced fiberglass are also used. Bowfishing arrows generally lack fletching, as it can cause the arrow to flare to one side or another underwater and they are not required at the relatively short ranges associated with bowfishing. Lighted nocks, and other custom features for arrows associated with night bowfishing are commonly available. Line is attached to the arrow by tying to a hole in the arrow shaft or through the use of a slide system.

Bowfishing line is often made from braided nylon, Dacron, or Spectra. Commonly used line weights range from 80 to 400 pound test, with 600 being used when bowhunting for alligators. Line color is normally either lime green, white, or neon orange.

Three types of reels are commonly used in bowfishing: hand-wrap and retriever. Hand-wrap reels are the simplest reels; they consist of a circular spool that line is wrapped onto by hand and then secured in a line holding slot. When the arrow is shot the line comes free from the line holder and feeds off the spool. Fish are caught by pulling the line in hand over hand. Retriever reels have a "bottle" which holds the line in place. When shot the line comes out either until the shot goes too far and the line runs out or the hunter pushes down a stopping device which can be used to keep a fish from traveling out too far. Some retriever reels have slots cut in them and are known as slotted retriever reels. They are more commonly used for alligator, alligator gar, shark and other big game that will take more time to chase down than smaller game fish.

=== Boats ===
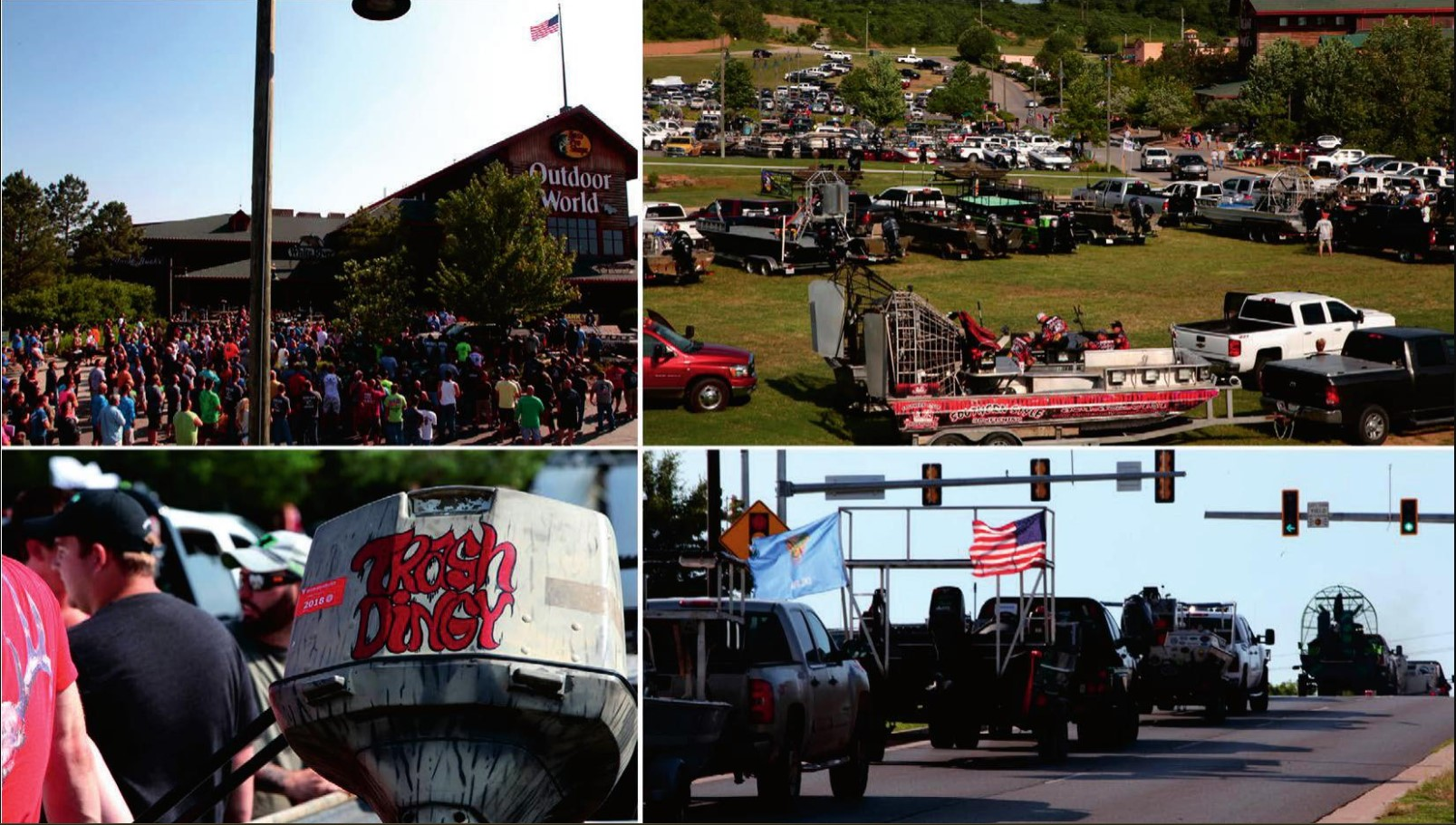
Bowfishing boats at the 2018 US Open Championship Tournament in Oklahoma. See Scarnecchia and Schooley (2020) for more details. Modern bowfishing exploits rapidly accelerating technologies to amass the most fish possible for sport killing, with the purpose of fish being discarded afterwards.

Although bowfishing can be done from the shore, bowfishers most often shoot from boats. Flat bottom "john boats" and canoes are used in areas of low water, as they have less draw, but are unsuitable for open water. Larger boats can accommodate multiple hunters. Many of these boats are highly customized specifically for bowfishing, with raised shooting platforms, and generators to provide electrical power to multiple lights for bowfishing at night. In dense marshlands that are unfriendly to boat propellers, airboats, which incorporate top-mounted fan propulsion for operating in very shallow waters, are usually used.

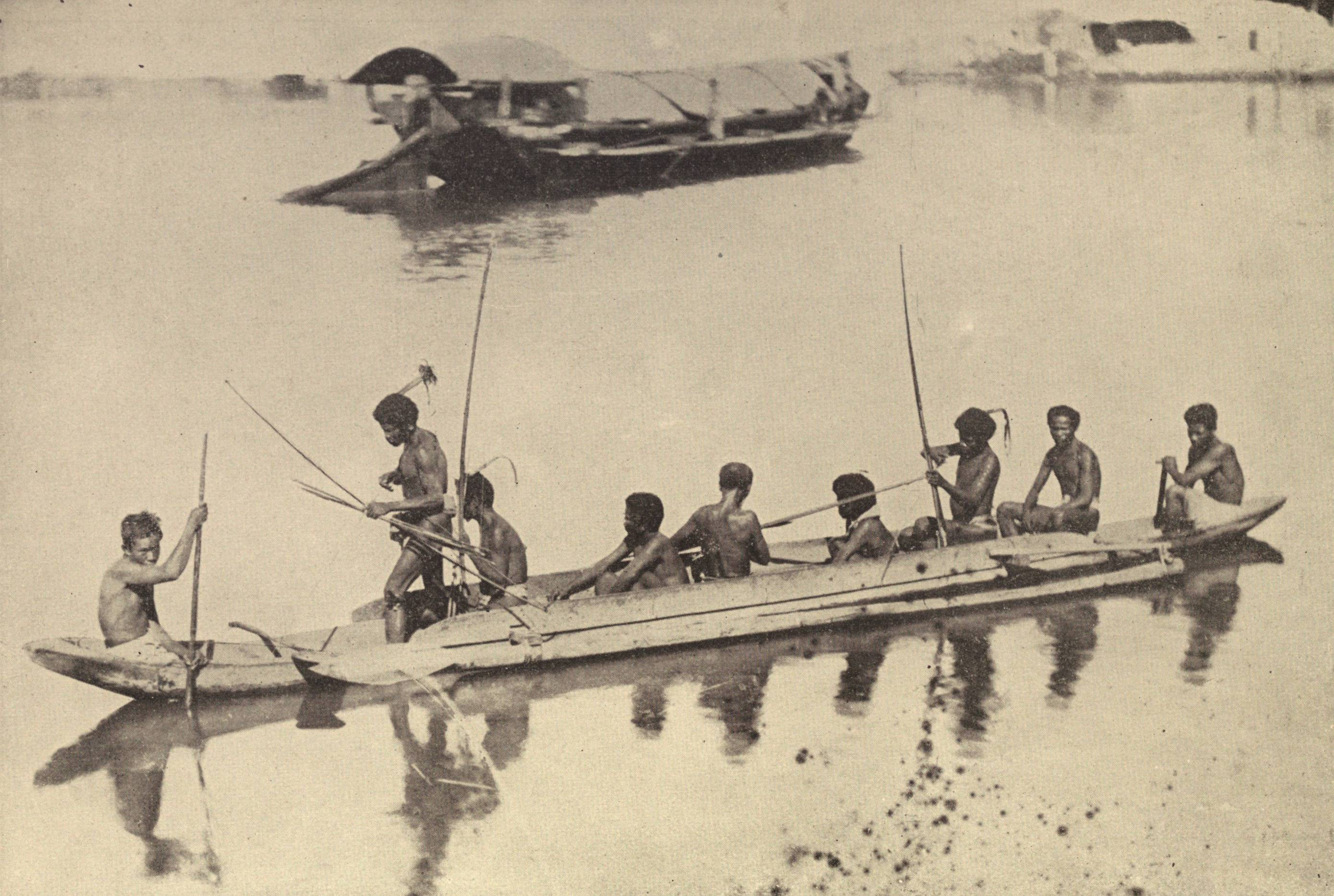
The Filipino Negritos traditionally used bows and arrows to shoot fish in clear water for subsistence.

Along with fishing from boats and off the shore, wading and shooting is also effective as long as the hunter does not mind getting soaked. Wading in rivers allows the shooter to get up close to the fish if the hunter is skillful. When keeping fish while wading, the hunter may use a stringer tied to a belt loop. Standing on large rocks in shallower parts of a river is another technique. This provides a better view higher out of the water. Going from rock to rock in a river with two hunters gets the fish moving if they are inactive. It is similar to herding the fish to the other hunter; while one hunter is wading the other is stationary on a rock. All of these river techniques typically work best for carp or catfish, depending on the location.

Due to the light refraction at the water surface and the optical distortion of the apparent position of underwater objects (which would appear to be shallower), aiming straight at the target silhouette usually results in a miss. Aiming well below the target compensates for this optical illusion. Depth and distance (as well as angle) of the target also impact how far below the fish to aim.

=== U.S. Open Bowfishing Championship ===
Each spring, Bass Pro Shops hosts the annual U.S. Open Bowfishing Championships. The 2025 event was held in Memphis, Tennessee. The 2026 championship details have yet to be announced.

== Controversy, management status and wanton waste ==
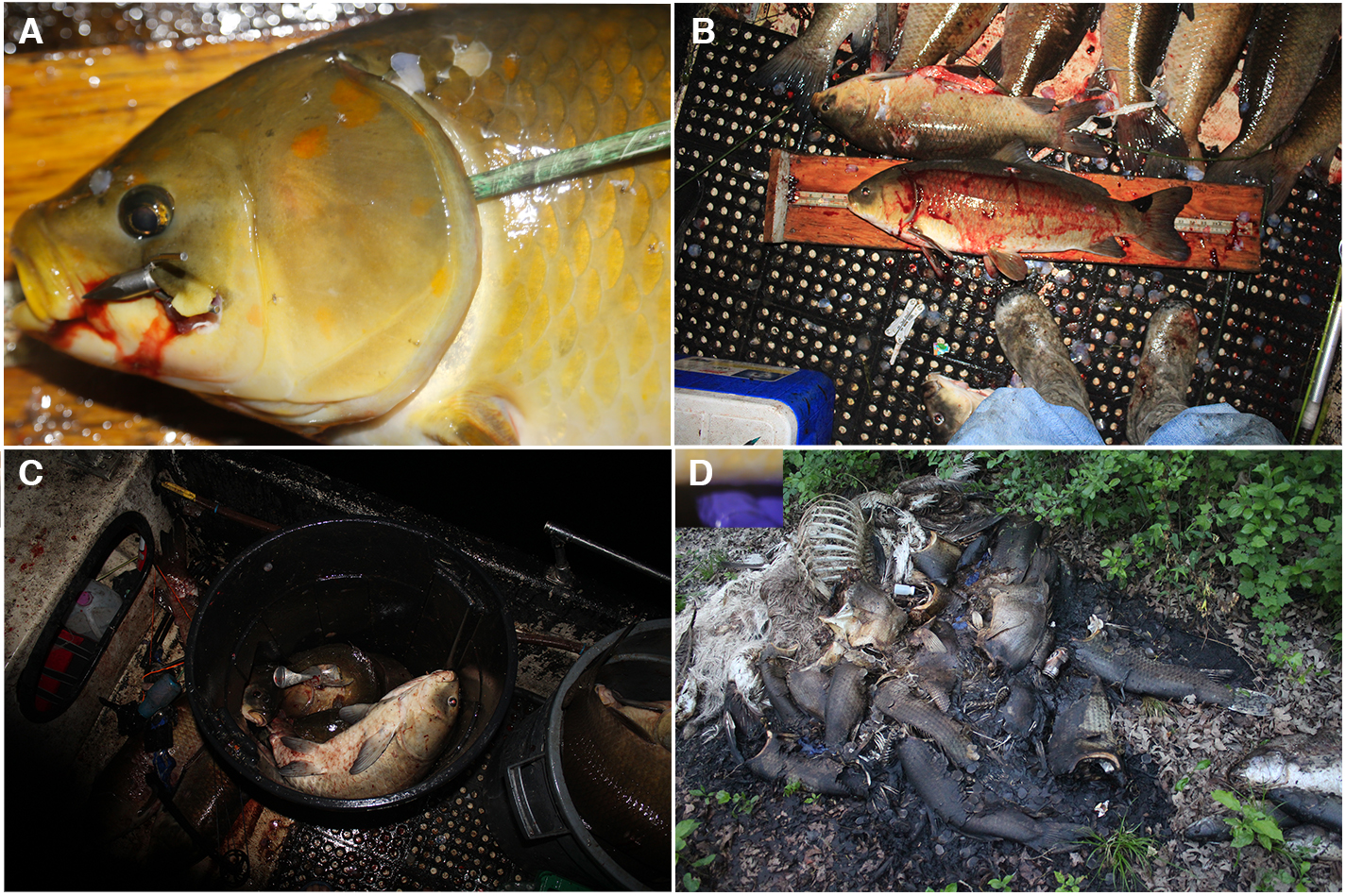
Sport bowfishing is prone to excessive waste of native species. For example, 100-year-old bigmouth buffalo in Minnesota and the cycle of modern bowfishing. See Scarnecchia et al. 2021.

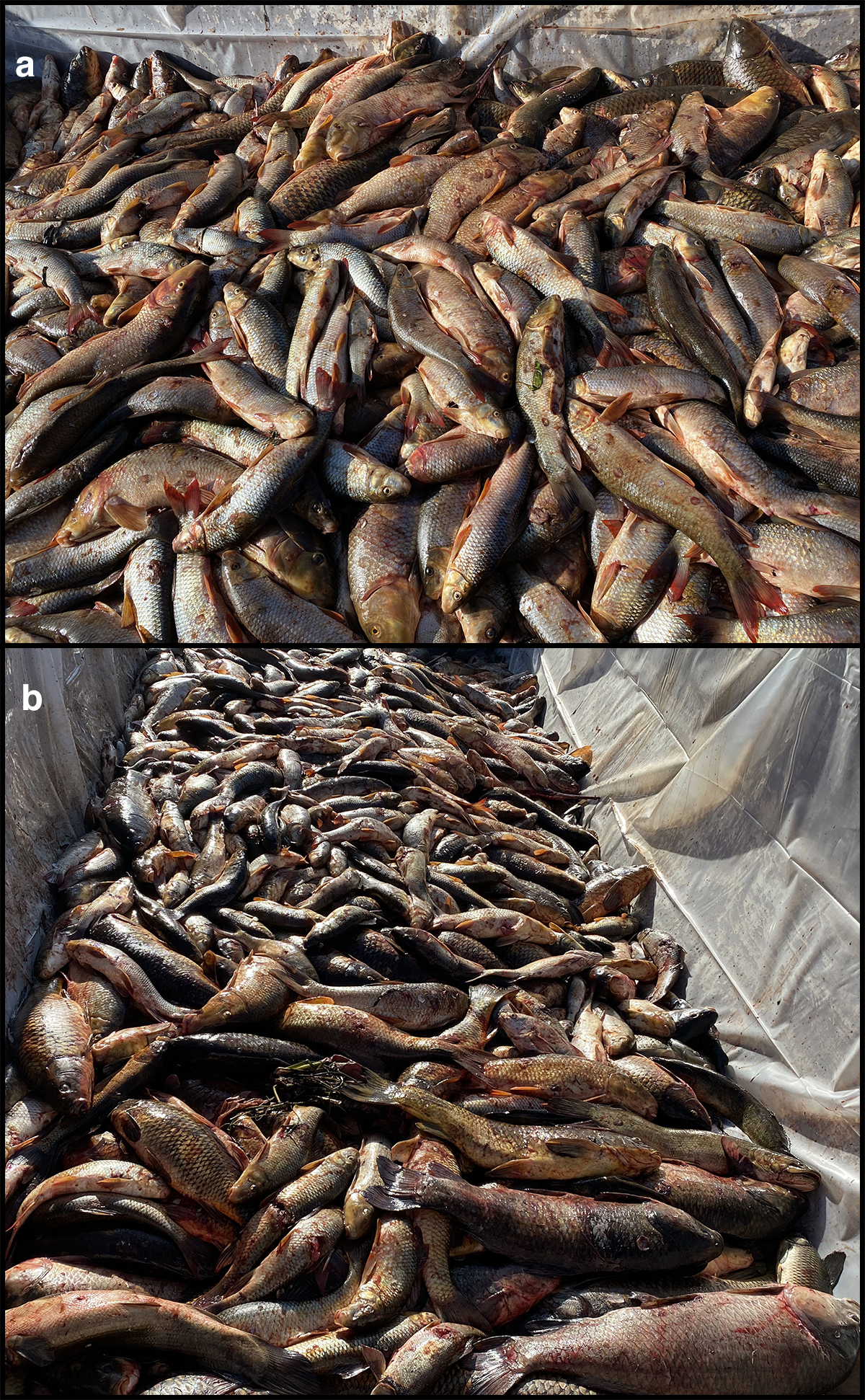
In this single-night bowfishing tournament in Minnesota, tons of native freshwater fish were shot and disposed. More than 65% of the total take was composed of four species of native redhorse, even though 11 other native fish species were shot and dumped into the disposal bin. Overall, ~85% of all individual fish shot were native fish, and only 1 of 16 species killed in this tournament was non-native. For more details see 2023 study.

During the late 20th century and into the 21st century bowfishing has increasingly become an ethically problematic sport prone to wanton waste of historically-underappreciated native species in the United States. Bowfishing's ecological damage has become amplified since the rise of night bowfishing during the 21st century. No bowfisheries management, complex native fish life histories, lack of funding for historically (and derogatorily) deemed "rough fish", and the heightened vulnerability of freshwater fishes and their habitats worldwide further exacerbates the ecological waste of modern bowfishing.

Modern sport bowfishing (occurring in the United States), which is often an effort to amass hundreds of native fish in single outings (sport killing) and to discard them as full-bodied carcasses afterwards, runs exactly counter to central principles of the North American Model of Wildlife Conservation. A modern biological understanding of several of these targeted native species (e.g., bigmouth buffalo, black buffalo, smallmouth buffalo, bowfins, quillback, river carpsucker, highfin carpsucker, redhorses) has shown that they exhibit complex life cycles that are prone to overfishing. Although some invasive species are sport bowfished in the United States including some carp species (e.g. common carp), the vast majority of sport bowfished species are ecologically-valuable native species including gars, bowfin, buffalofishes, carpsuckers, redhorse, several other catostomids species, freshwater drum, hiodontids, paddlefish, bullheads, and catfish.

Approaching and killing fish aided by powerful spot lights at night is creates a disproportionate advantage to the bowfisher because fish are less skittish, wind conditions are calmer, many fishes move shallower, there is no glare from sun and clouds, there is less boat traffic and less law enforcement. Shining and hunting terrestrial animals at night is generally outlawed. The current management paradigm for bowfishing freshwater animals is blatantly inconsistent with established conservation. Further, violations often occur at bowfishing tournaments because they are unregulated and no law enforcement or agency presence occurs at weigh-ins. In the 21st century, night bowfishing has grown in popularity and legality, and is practiced by a growing contingent of bowfishers. More than 1,000 native fish can be removed in a single bowfishing outings. In saltwater, rays and sharks are regularly pursued.

== Targeted species ==
=== Freshwater ===
- Common carp
- Bighead carp
- Silver carp
- Grass carp
- River carpsucker
- Longnose gar
- Shortnose gar
- Spotted gar
- Alligator gar
- Paddlefish
- Threadfin shad
- Frog
- Bigmouth buffalo
- Smallmouth buffalo
- Freshwater drum
- Catfish
- American alligator
- Tilapia
- Bowfin
- Asian snakehead

=== Saltwater ===
- Southern stingray
- Cownose ray
- Bull shark
- Barracuda
- Flounder
- Sheepshead

== See also ==
- Harpooning
- Spearfishing
