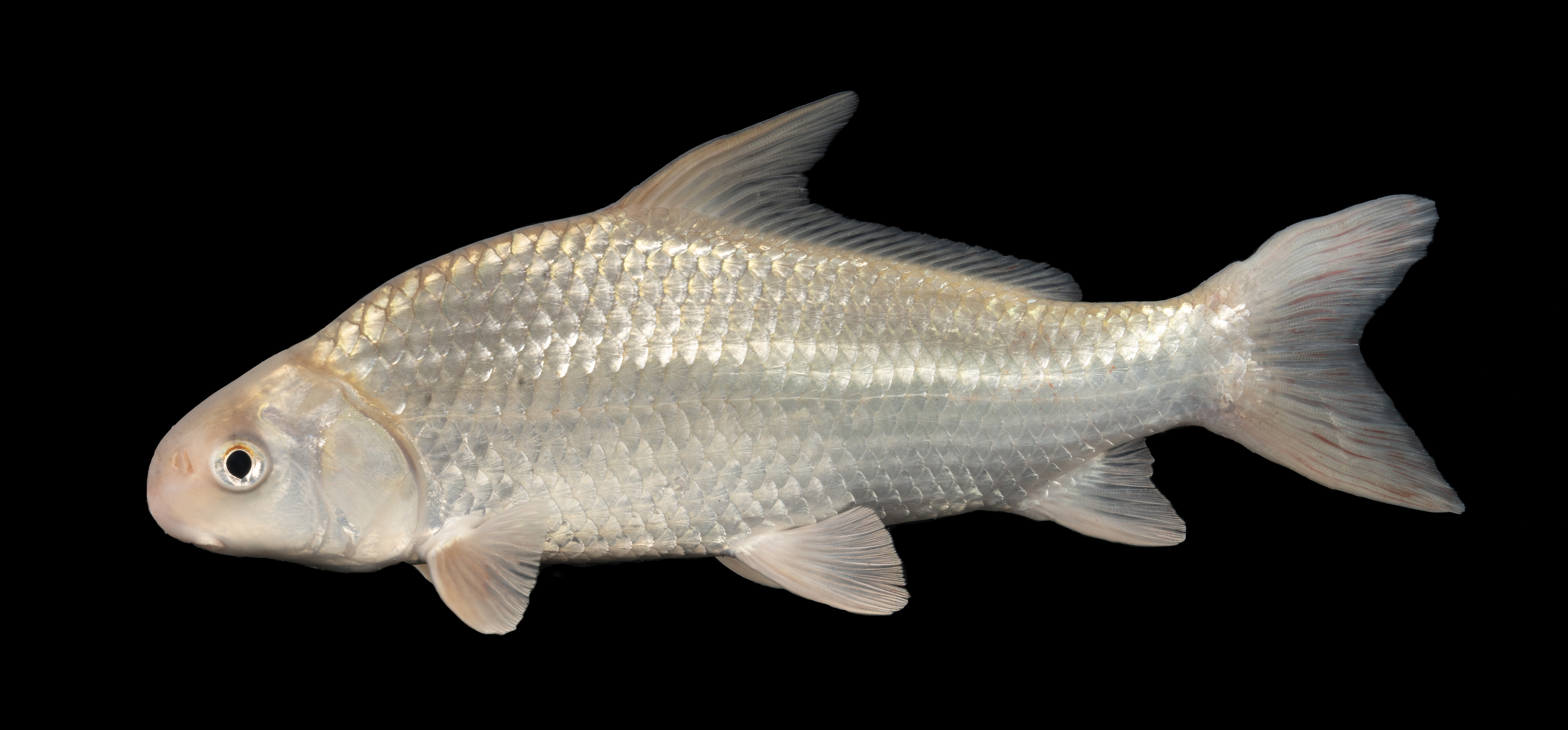

Conservation status
- Least Concern (IUCN 3.1)

Scientific classification
- Kingdom: Animalia
- Phylum: Chordata
- Class: Actinopterygii
- Division: Teleostei
- Order: Cypriniformes
- Family: Catostomidae
- Genus: Carpiodes
- Species: C. carpio

Binomial name
- Carpiodes carpio (Rafinesque, 1820)

Synonyms
- Catostomus carpio Rafinesque, 1820

= River carpsucker =

Species of fish

The river carpsucker (Carpiodes carpio) is a long-lived freshwater fish belonging to the Catostomidae that is native to the inland United States and northern Mexico. This species has a slightly arched back and is somewhat stout and compressed. While the fins are usually opaque, in older fish they may be dark yellow. It is distributed along the Mississippi River basin from Pennsylvania to Montana. The river carpsucker, like most suckers, is benthivorous and obtains its nutrients from algae, microcrustaceans, and other various tiny planktonic plants and animals found in silty substrates. Like its congeners, the quillback and highfin carpsucker, the river carpsucker is long-lived, with a known maximum lifespan of 40 years in Colorado, 47 years in Minnesota, and 56 years in Wisconsin. It begins to reproduce typically in late spring, and the female usually releases more than 100,000 eggs. There is no parental care provided.

== Distribution ==
The river carpsucker has historically occupied the Mississippi River basin from Pennsylvania to Montana. It also currently occupies the Gulf Slope Drainage from the Calcasieu River to the Rio Grande in Texas, Louisiana, and New Mexico. It was introduced to Lake Erie and the lower Maumee River, Ohio. It was supposedly deliberately introduced with a shipment of buffalofish as a game species, and they are currently used in sport fishing. The effects of its introduction have not been studied, so are not well known. However, failure to find more river carpsuckers in the lower Maumee River suggests this species never took hold in this area. In the spring, they migrate upstream as the water temperatures begin to rise, and then move back downstream after spawning. They have been known to travel distances of up to 10 kilometers (6.2 mi).

== Description ==
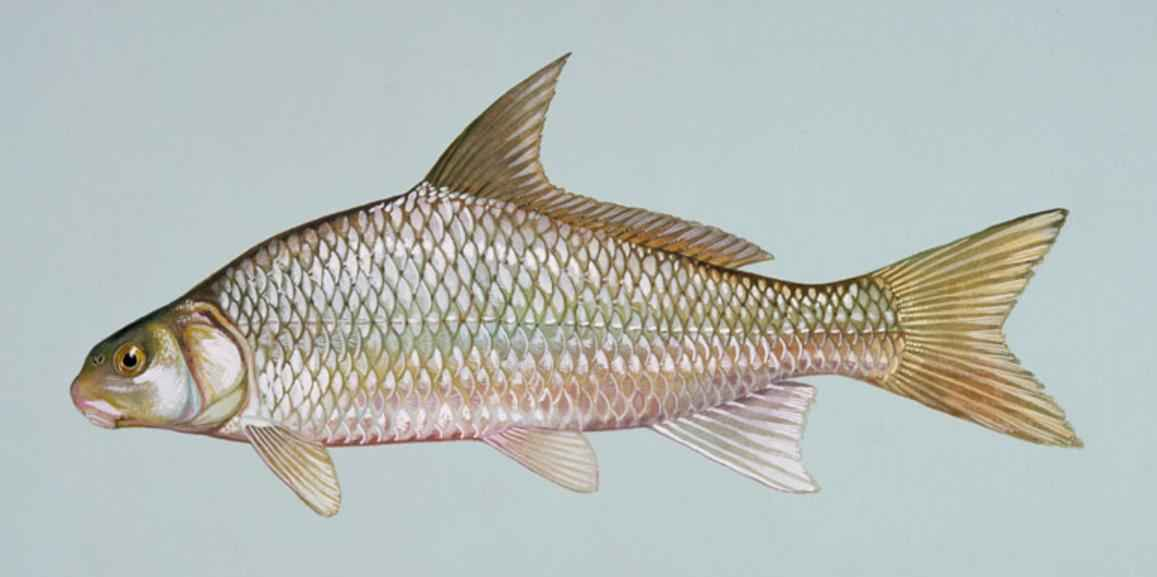
Illustration

The physical appearance of the river carpsucker is fairly distinctive. It is stout, with a somewhat compressed and arched back. The area around its dorsal fin is olive-brown before it fades to silver, with a white belly. In the young, the fins are usually opaque, while in the old, their fins are a dark yellow. The lower lip is projected in a similar fashion to a nipple at the midpoint, and big scales cover its whole body. It also has a distinctive 18 caudal fin rays. The species is frequently confused with non-native species, such as the various Asian carp species.

== Ecology ==
The river carpsucker is classified as a suction, or filter feeder, which means it typically eats algae and small planktonic animals and plants. They get their nutrients from filtering silt and detritus. It is typically preyed on by larger carnivorous fish such as northern pike, muskellunge, walleye, and largemouth bass, but mostly in its juvenile stage. Their largest predators are humans, although some larger birds, such as great blue herons, have been known to eat them. They can be found in large rivers and reservoirs, with sand or silt bottoms in slower-moving currents. The young typically are found in small streams, or tributaries. They are more abundant in areas with slower water velocity and moderate temperatures.

== Lifecycle ==
During breeding season, small tubercles can be observed on the body of the male. Reproduction typically occurs during late spring, in large spawning groups. A female can release more than 100,000 eggs. The eggs are typically adhesive and demersal with a diameter of about 1.7 to 2.1 millimeters (0.067 to 0.083 in), and they typically hatch within eight to 15 days. To spawn, the temperature of the water is typically around 18.3 to 19.1 °C (64.9 to 66.4 °F), and spawning ends around the beginning of summer when water temperatures begin to rise. They exhibit no parental care; instead, they broadcast their eggs onto the sand and then leave them. The lifespan of river carpsucker can span decades, much like other long-lived catostomids. River carpsucker lifespans approaching or exceeding 50 years are evident. They are schooling fish and will often be found in large groups.

== Relationship with people ==
The river carpsucker currently has no established management plans but they are declining in Colorado, are sometimes caught by commercial fishers for food, and are increasingly being targeted by modern bowfishing for sport killing. Despite these trends they are not yet officially considered a game species. However, they are in large abundance in a few areas in their range. They are plentiful in Elephant Butte Reservoir and Caballo Lake in New Mexico. They also can be affected by humans; their population begins reducing rapidly with the introduction of toxins into their habitat. The world record for the species stands at 13.4 lb (6.1 kg) caught by bowfishing in North Dakota in 2021.
