= Lassis Inn =

Restaurant in Little Rock, Arkansas

Coordinates: 34.7228°N 92.2684°W

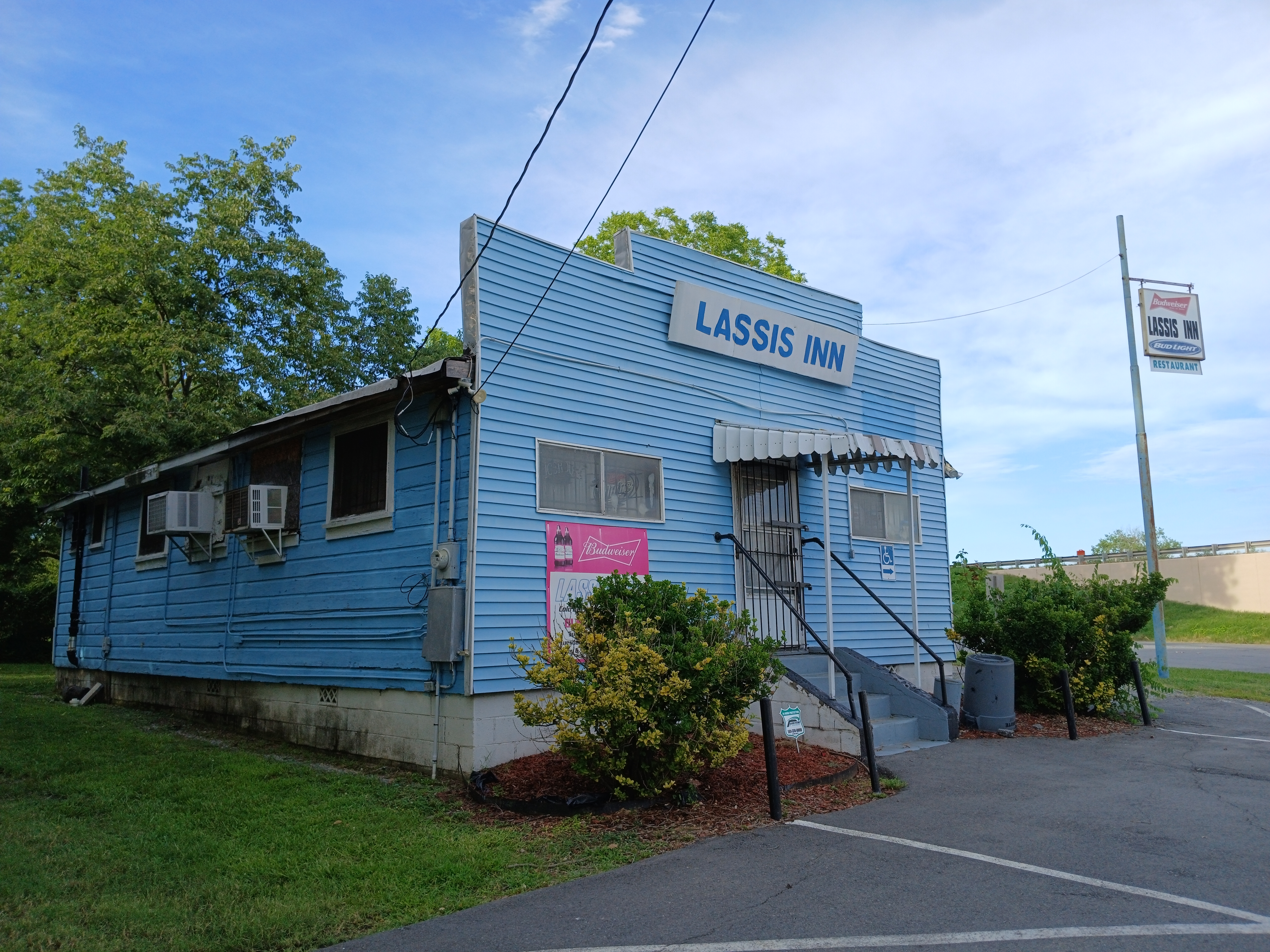
- The Lassis Inn in July, 2024
- Interactive map of Lassis Inn

Restaurant information
- Established: 1905
- Owners: Elihue Jr. and Maria Washington
- Previous owners: Joe and Molassis Watson
- Food type: Catfish
- Location: 518 E 27th St, Little Rock, Arkansas, United States

Lassis Inn is a restaurant in Little Rock, Arkansas, United States, founded in 1905. It was a meeting place for local civil rights leaders in the 1950s and 60s. In 2017 it was one of three inaugural inductees into the Arkansas Food Hall of Fame and in 2020 was named an America's Classic by the James Beard Foundation.

== History ==
The restaurant was founded by Joe and Molassis Watson around 1905 and is one of the oldest restaurants in Arkansas

The couple started the business by selling sandwiches from their home. As the business grew, they added fried catfish and built a separate structure for the carryout business. In 1931 the Watsons moved the building and business to East 27th Street and in the 1960s moved again slightly due to freeway construction. The restaurant is just below the Interstate 30 abutment south of the downtown area.

The restaurant was a meeting place for civil rights leaders in the 1950s and 60s, including Daisy Bates, while they were planning efforts such as the desegregation of Little Rock Central High School. It was considered a "safe haven" for these activists.

Due to health problems faced by the owner, the restaurant was closed in December 2022 but planned to reopen. In July 2024, Elihue Washington Jr. filed a lawsuit to get of his contract to sell the restaurant to Kristian Nelson "claiming, among other things, Nelson paid him with a hot check." In August 2024, the suit was settled in his favor.

== Menu ==
The restaurant specializes in catfish, including fried catfish and catfish steaks, "fish ribs" (made from local specialty buffalo fish) and hushpuppies.

Southern Living calls out the fish ribs, saying "it's actually a type of bony, white-fleshed, freshwater fish. The buffalo fish's larger bones are butchered with enough flesh on each side of the bone to resemble spareribs. The result is a crunchy, hot, and meaty rib". The buffalo fish is not a preferred fish due to its many small bones; the only part of the fish that is free of these is the rib.

== Recognition ==
In 2017 it was among the three inaugural inductees into the Arkansas Food Hall of Fame, along with Rhoda's Famous Hot Tamales and Jones Bar-B-Q Diner. In 2020, it was named an America's Classic by the James Beard Foundation. Arkansas Online called the restaurant's catfish and buffalo "some of the state's best fried fish". Kelley Bass in Heaping Spoonful called it "a truly legendary restaurant". Southern Living named the restaurant in 2022 to their compilation of the South's Best Soul Food.

== Ownership ==
The restaurant was purchased by Elihue Washington Jr. and Maria Washington in 1989.
