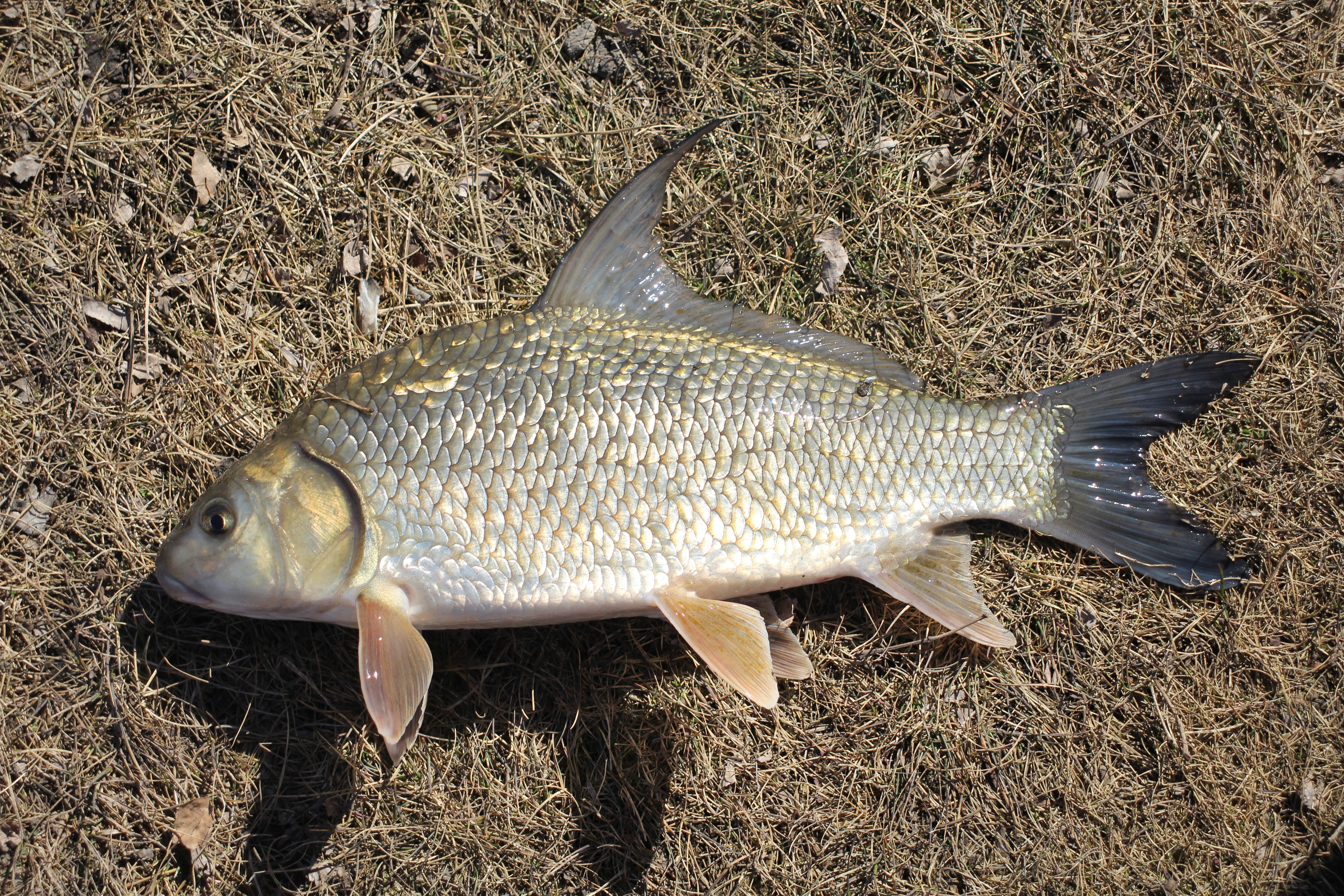

Conservation status
- Least Concern (IUCN 3.1)

Scientific classification
- Kingdom: Animalia
- Phylum: Chordata
- Class: Actinopterygii
- Division: Teleostei
- Order: Cypriniformes
- Family: Catostomidae
- Genus: Carpiodes
- Species: C. cyprinus

Binomial name
- Carpiodes cyprinus (Lesueur, 1817)

Synonyms
- Catostomus cyprinus (Lesueur, 1817)

= Quillback =

Species of fish

The quillback (Carpiodes cyprinus), also known as the quillback sucker or quillback carpsucker, is a type of freshwater fish of the sucker family widely distributed throughout North America. It is deeper-bodied than most suckers, leading to a fuller-bodied appearance. However, the quillback is not a carp. Quillback are catostomids, and like all catostomids, they do not have barbels around the mouth. The quillback is long-lived, with age up to 30 years found in Florida, and lifespans of 44 - 52 years in Canada, Minnesota, Colorado, and Wisconsin.

== Physical description ==
The quillback is a medium-sized, deep-bodied fish found throughout North America. It has a small head, humped back and deeply forked caudal fin. The compressed body of the quillback makes it look flattened when viewed from the side. The quillback has a subterminal mouth with no barbels, and no nipple-like protrusions on the bottom lip. It has large, reflective, silver cycloid scales that are responsible for giving the quillback its characteristic silver color. They have a white belly with yellow or orange lower fins. The tail and dorsal fin are usually gray or silver. The quillback gets its name from the long quill that is formed via the first several fin rays of the dorsal fin. Quillback are typically 15–20 inches on average, weighing between 1 and 4 pounds. However, they can grow up to 26 inches and weigh 10 pounds. The quillback has a nearly straight, hyper-sensitive lateral line, composed of at least 37 lateral line scales. This helps the fish locate predators and prey.

== Distribution, habitat and diet ==
The quillback is found throughout much of North America, from Saskatchewan to Florida, and from South Dakota to Alabama. The quillback occupies temperate, freshwater habitats. This includes many streams, lakes, channels and rivers. They prefer water that is clear, slow moving, highly productive and moderately deep. The quillback can commonly be found in the Hudson Bay, the Mississippi River basin, the Great Lakes, and drainages from the Delaware, Apalachicola, and Pearl rivers. They often comprise a large portion of the biomass of warmwater rivers, but they are very difficult to catch with traditional American angling methods. The quillback is closely related to the highfin carpsucker and the river carpsucker. All three species are rarely caught by anglers due to their feeding habits, but they have been caught occasionally on worms, minnows, and artificial lures.

Quillbacks usually feed in schools. They are omnivores and bottom feeders that prefer lakes, rivers and streams in which the water is clear at the bottom. The school of quillbacks moves slowly over a sand or gravel bottom when they eat. Their typical diet consists of aquatic insect larvae and other small organisms although they have also been known to eat molluscs and aquatic vegetation.

== Life history ==
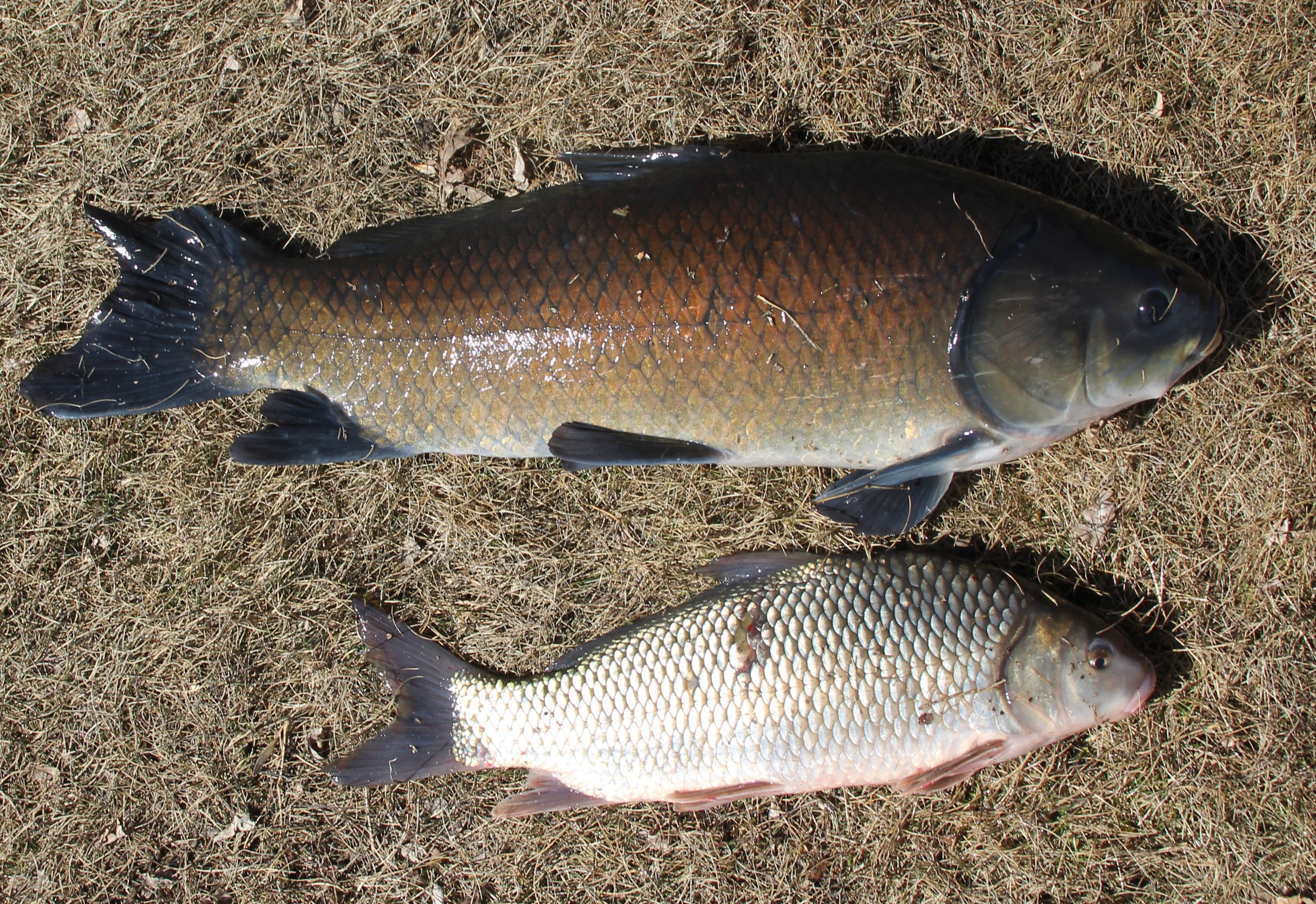
A bigmouth buffalo (top) compared to a quillback (bottom). Both of these species are long-lived catostomids

The quillback is a slow-paced and long-lived freshwater fish species that belongs to a subfamily (Ictiobinae) for which long-lived freshwater fishes are becoming known. In Minnesota they can reach sexual maturity by age 8–9 years, live several decades at adult size, recruit sporadically, and can live more than 40 years. Quillback also may accrue age-spot pigmentation after 30 years, similar to their larger-bodied cousins, the bigmouth buffalo. A study from Colorado revealed sexual maturity by an age of 3 years, highly variable recruitment, population declines, and longevity approaching 50 years. Recruitment is also highly variable in Wisconsin, with asymptotic growth, lifespans more than 50 years, and black spot pigmentation accrual evident.

== Reproduction ==
The quillback reproduces once yearly, typically in late spring or early summer. The timing of reproduction depends on the water temperature. Ideal temperatures for reproduction are between 7–18 degrees Celsius. Spawning occurs upstream of the typical quillback habitat, and they migrate in schools to the spawning site. The female quillback produces between 15,000 and 60,000 eggs, and scatters them in shallow water over a sandy or mud bottom. Fertilization then happens externally, and the eggs are left in quiet water. Since the quillback is oviparous, the eggs are hatched outside of the fish's body. The quillback possesses a polygynandrous mating system, meaning that two or more males have an exclusive sexual relationship with two or more females. Sex ratios may vary significantly by population.

== Relationship with humans ==
The quillback is currently at risk for extinction in various states throughout the continental United States including Vermont, New York and Michigan. A recent threat to the species is modern bowfishing, which is unregulated across the USA and prone to harvest discard. Other places prove vulnerability and population declines to the species including Alberta, Saskatchewan, Quebec, South Dakota, Colorado, Kansas, Oklahoma, Arkansas, Louisiana and North Carolina. Quillbacks benefit the North American ecosystems they reside in because they are vital native members of the community. The quillback has an economic benefit to Mexico. The IGFA world record for the species stands at 8lb 1oz taken from Lake Manitoba in Canada in 2016.
