= Buffalo ribs =

American dish made from fish ribs

- Type: Fried fish
- Course: Main course
- Region or state: Arkansas
- Associated cuisine: Soul food
- Serving temperature: Hot
- Main ingredients: Buffalo fish

Buffalo ribs is an American dish from the state of Arkansas. It is made from the fried ribs of the bigmouth buffalo fish.

== History ==
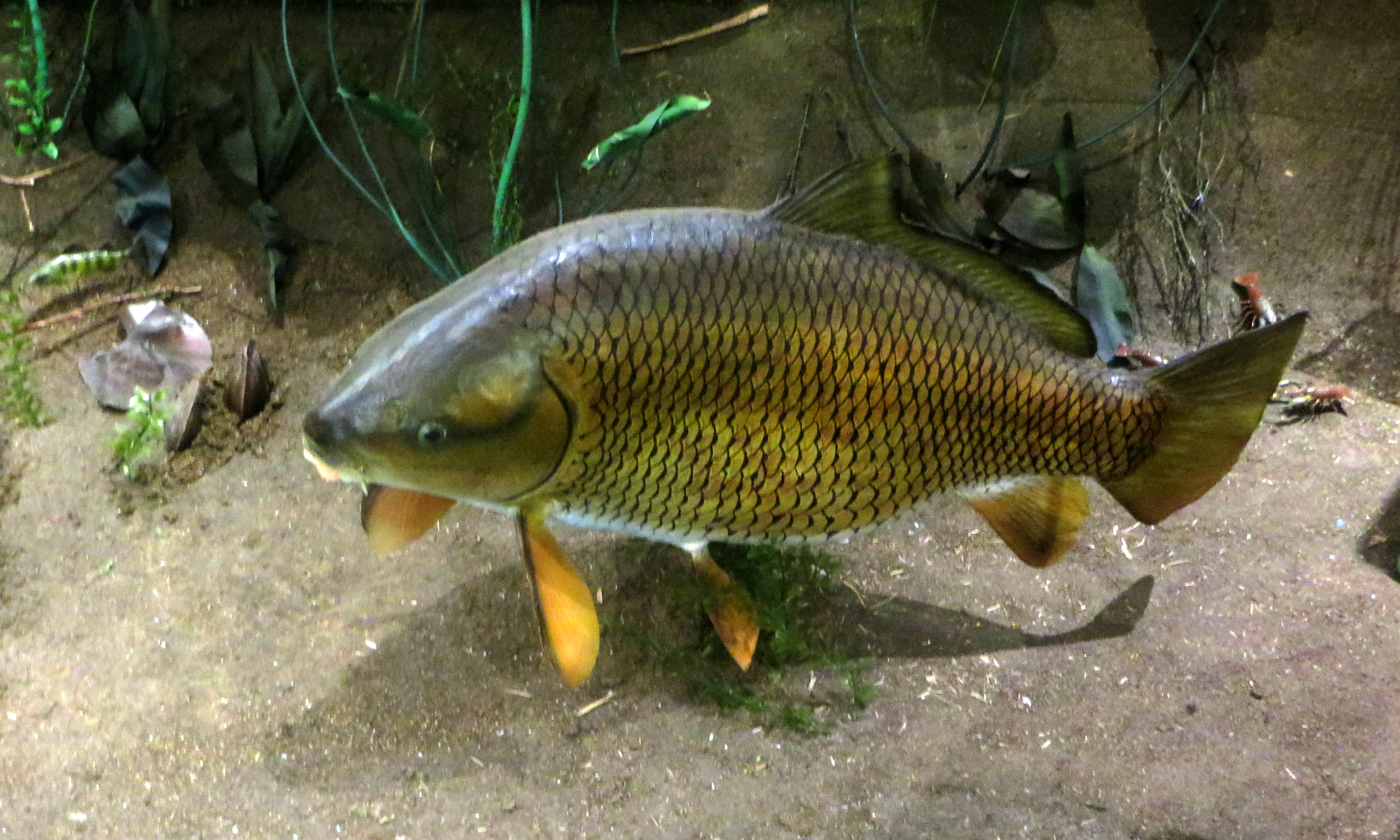
Buffalo fish

The dish has historically been served at the Lassis Inn in Little Rock, Arkansas, which opened at an unknown date in the early 20th century. It is served at restaurants and food trucks throughout Arkansas. The dish is also served in parts of Mississippi and Louisiana. They are considered to be a delicacy of southern cuisine. Buffalo fish are sometimes looked down upon because of their boniness and their reputation as bottom feeders. They have historically been more widely eaten by minority groups such as African-Americans, and are considered soul food. Southern Living included Lassis' buffalo ribs on its list of "The South's Best Soul Food". In the 21st century, the popularity of buffalo ribs has declined to modernizing diet patterns.

== Description ==
Bigmouth buffalo fish have gamey white meat with a flaky texture that is streaked with fat. With the exception of the meat around its ribs near the head, the fish's flesh contains small, free-floating bones. The ribs, along with the boneless meat surrounding them, are typically removed as fillets or "slabs". The ribs are prepared by breading them in an egg and cornmeal mixture, before deep-frying them in a manner similar to catfish. They are traditionally served with a side of french fries or hushpuppies.
