= Black Buffalo =

Black Buffalo may refer to:

- Black Buffalo (chief), grandfather of Crazy Horse
- Black Buffalo (wrestler) (born 1974), Japanese professional wrestler

== See also ==
- Black buffalo, a species of fish
