= Haff disease =

- Other names: Haffkrankheit
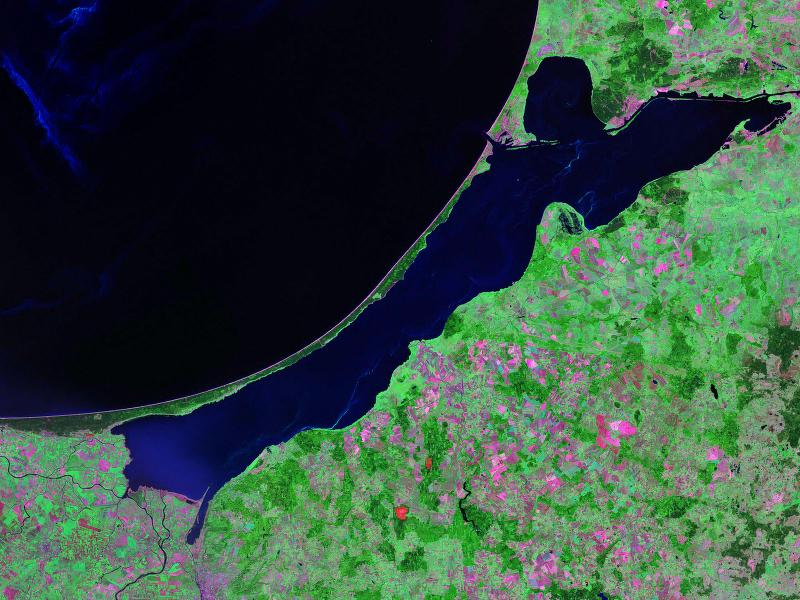
- Satellite photo of the Vistula Lagoon (German: Frisches Haff). Haff disease was first described in the location of Königsberg.
- Specialty: Toxicology

Haff disease is the development of rhabdomyolysis (swelling and breakdown of skeletal muscle, with a risk of acute kidney failure) within 24 hours of ingesting fish.

== History ==
The disease was first described in 1924 in the vicinity of Königsberg, Germany (now Kaliningrad, Russia) on the Baltic coast, in people staying around the northern part of the Vistula Lagoon (German: Frisches Haff).

Over the subsequent fifteen years, about 1000 cases were reported in people, birds and cats, usually in the summer and fall, and a link was made with the consumption of fish (burbot, eel and pike). Since that time, only occasional reports have appeared of the condition, mostly from the Soviet Union and Germany.

In 1997, six cases of Haff disease were reported in California and Missouri, all after the consumption of buffalo fish (Ictiobus cyprinellus).

In July and August 2010, dozens of people contracted rhabdomyolysis after eating Procambarus clarkii in Nanjing, China. A month later, the Chinese authorities claimed they had Haff disease.

An outbreak was reported in Brooklyn, New York on 18 November 2011, when two household members were stricken by the syndrome after eating buffalo fish. On February 4, 2014, two cases of Haff disease were reported in Cook County, Illinois following the consumption of buffalo fish.

A group from Brazil identified a Haff disease outbreak in the State of Bahia that lasted from December 2016 to April 2017, with 67 cases identified. In August 2018, a couple from São Paulo, southeastern Brazil, fell ill and needed semi-intensive hospital care after eating fish of the species known in Portuguese as "arabaiana" or "olho-de-boi" (ox-eye), possibly the southern yellowtail amberjack, Seriola lalandi, which they had bought in the city of Fortaleza, State of Ceará, northeastern Brazil, and, according to them, looked "perfect". The day following their admission to hospital the patients already presented an alteration of their urine, which, according to the woman who fell ill, "was very dark, indeed looked like Coca-Cola".

On March 2, 2021, a 31-year-old woman from Recife, Brazil, died from Haff disease after ingesting yellowtail amberjack.

=== Poison ===
The exact nature of the poison is still unclear. In the U.S. outbreak, the source of the fish was traced by the Centers for Disease Control and Prevention, and studies of other fish from the same sources showed a hexane-soluble (and hence non-polar lipid) substance that induced similar symptoms in mice; other food-borne poisons commonly found in fish could not be detected. It cannot be inactivated by cooking, as all six CDC cases had consumed cooked or fried fish. Palytoxin has been proposed as a disease model. It has also been suggested that the toxin may have thiaminase activity (i.e. it degrades thiamine, also known as vitamin B1).

== Symptoms ==
Some of the reported symptoms include:

- Muscle pain
- Light to dark brown-colored urine
- Nausea
- Chest pain
- Vomiting
- Shortness of breath
- Profuse sweating
- Pain to light touch

Dry mouth, numbness of thighs or whole body, back pain, and stomach cramps are also reported, but seen less frequently.

== Secondary sources ==
- Jürgen W. Schmidt: Die "Haffkrankheit" in Ostpreussen im Herbst 1932, in: Preussenland - Mitteilungen der Historischen Kommission für Ost- und Westpreussische Landesforschung und aus dem Geheimen Staatsarchiv Preussischer Kulturbesitz Heft 2/2009 (47. Jg.) pp. 57–60
