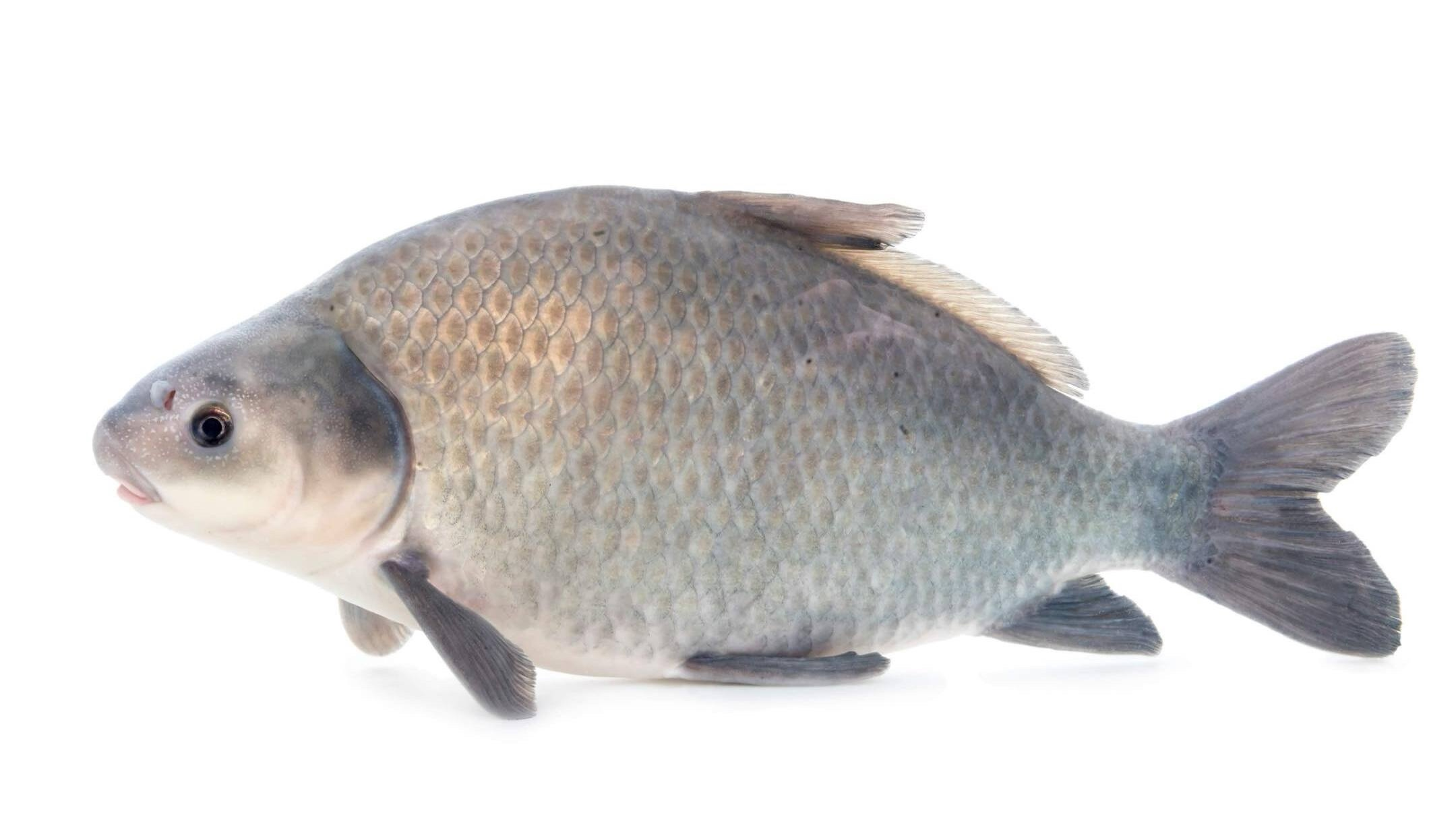

Conservation status
- Least Concern (IUCN 3.1)

Scientific classification
- Kingdom: Animalia
- Phylum: Chordata
- Class: Actinopterygii
- Division: Teleostei
- Order: Cypriniformes
- Family: Catostomidae
- Genus: Ictiobus
- Species: I. bubalus

Binomial name
- Ictiobus bubalus (Rafinesque, 1818)
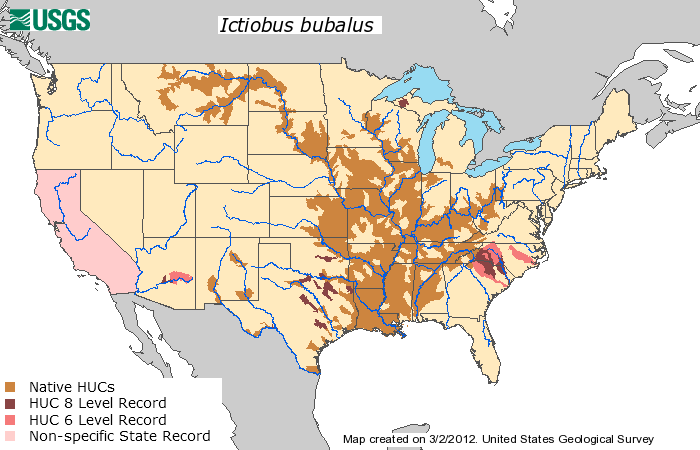
- The distribution of I. bubalus in the United States

Synonyms
- Catostomus bubalus Rafinesque, 1818; Bubalichthys altus Nelson, 1877; Bubalichthys bubalinus Jordan, 1877; Carpiodes taurus Agassiz, 1854; Carpiodes tumidus Baird & Girard, 1854; Carpiodes urus Agassiz, 1854; Ichthyobus cyanellus Nelson, 1876; Icthyobus ischyrus Nelson, 1877

= Smallmouth buffalo =

Species of fish

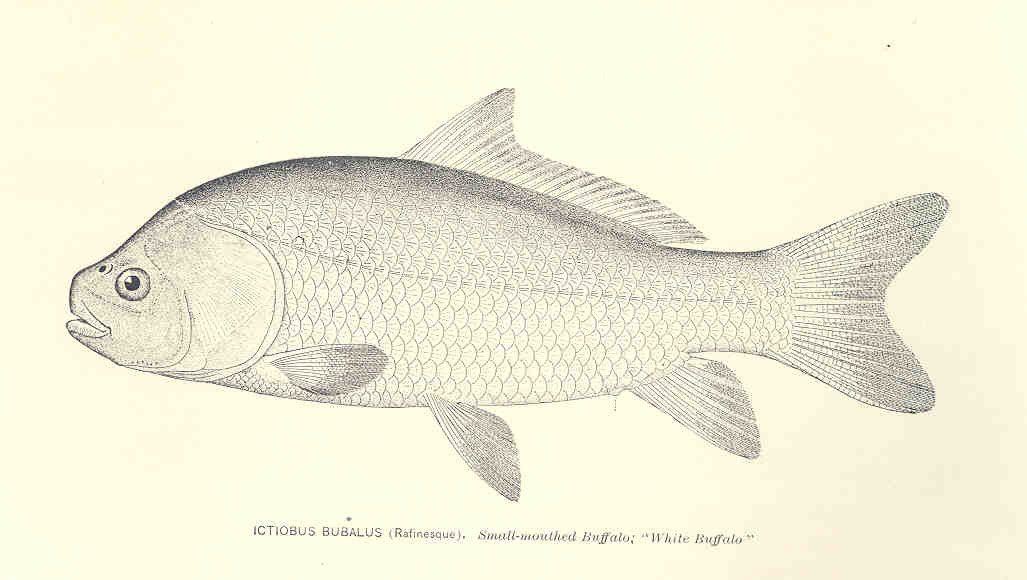
FMIB 33324 Ictiobus bubalus (Rafinesque)

The smallmouth buffalo (Ictiobus bubalus, from the Greek for "bull-fish" and "buffalo") is a catostomid fish species native to the major tributaries and surrounding waters of the Mississippi River in the United States, as well as some other water systems where it has been introduced. It is a long-lived, stocky fish like its relatives the bigmouth buffalo (I. cyprinellus) and the black buffalo (I. niger). The smallmouth buffalo's mouth is located ventrally like other Catostomidae species, whereas the bigmouth buffalo's mouth is terminal and opens forward. It is thought that smallmouth buffalo eyes are significantly larger than those of the black buffalo. Despite being members of different scientific suborders, these three species are sometimes conflated with common carp (Cyprinus carpio), but an easy and notable difference is that all catostomids lack the characteristic barbels of carp, and carp are not native to North America whereas buffalofish are. The smallmouth buffalo is recently realized as one of the longest-lived fishes, capable of living more than a century. The smallmouth buffalo is in decline across large portions of its range, and is subject to unregulated exploitation. Like the other buffalofish species, the smallmouth buffalo is targeted by modern bowfishing.

== Description ==
The coloration of smallmouth buffalo ranges from shades of gray to brown and coppery green dorsally and pale yellow to white ventrally. Fins color match the portion of the body where they attach and are generally darker towards the tips. They are characteristically stocky, having a hump that rises up from the operculum. Pectoral fins protrude ventrally like the anal fins, the caudal fin has even lobes, and the dorsal fin protrudes from the top of the hump to a blunt point, then shortens and runs the remaining length of the body to the base of the tail. Typical adults reach a length around 40–60 cm (16–24 in), with some specimens reaching as much as 30.1 kg (66.4 pounds) and 101.5 cm (40.0 in).

== Habitat ==
The smallmouth buffalo is a hardy fish that frequents clear, moderate to fast-moving streams, but has been occasionally known in some lakes and ponds. If prefers waters with dense aquatic vegetation and a silty bottom. It has a high tolerance for hard water and can survive in waters with pH ranges of 6.5–8.5.

== Diet ==
The smallmouth buffalo's diet is primarily that of a detritivore, using its ventral sucker mouth to pick up vegetation and other organic matter from the bottom of its habitat, often scraping algae off of rocks. It is also quite the invertivore, consuming zooplankton, insect larvae, mollusk larvae, and small crustaceans.

== Life history ==
Spawning usually takes place in spring and summer, with more specific times depending on the location of the population. Migration is negligible. Spawning often occurs in shallower sections of streams where the egg can adhere to vegetation and gravel to keep from flowing away. Each female can lay tens of thousands to hundreds of thousands of eggs at a time depending on her size, and no parental care is applied and the eggs hatch in one to two weeks. The young hide in aquatic vegetation to avoid predators. The lifespan of a smallmouth buffalo was historically not well known because of limited study on their otoliths and a reliance instead on other structures (e.g. scales, fin rays, gill plates) that are inadequate for age analysis. However, a 2019 study took an initial look at their otoliths (earstones) from a commercially harvested population in the middle Mississippi River drainage and found that even with harvest, about half of the sample was 20 years or older, with the oldest being 39 years of age. A 2020 study on a single female specimen from Oklahoma found it was 62 years old. In 2023, smallmouth buffalo otoliths were age validated, with longevity more than 60 years in Oklahoma. In Arizona, smallmouth buffalo as old as 90–100 years of age were discovered. The onset of sexual maturity for smallmouth buffalo can vary by population but is typically 6–10 years for males and around 8–11 years for females.

== Relationship with humans ==
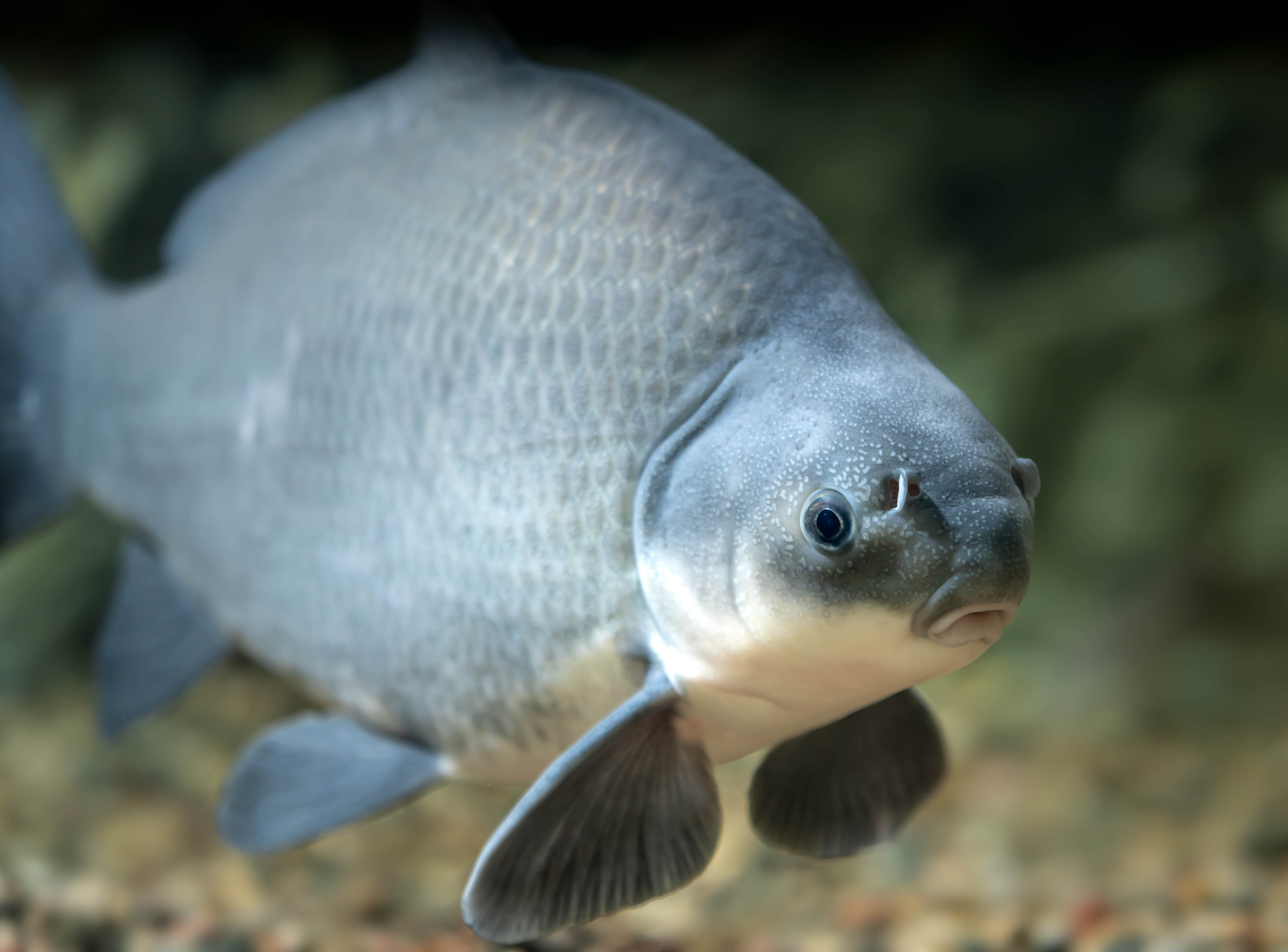
At Gavins Point National Fish Hatchery

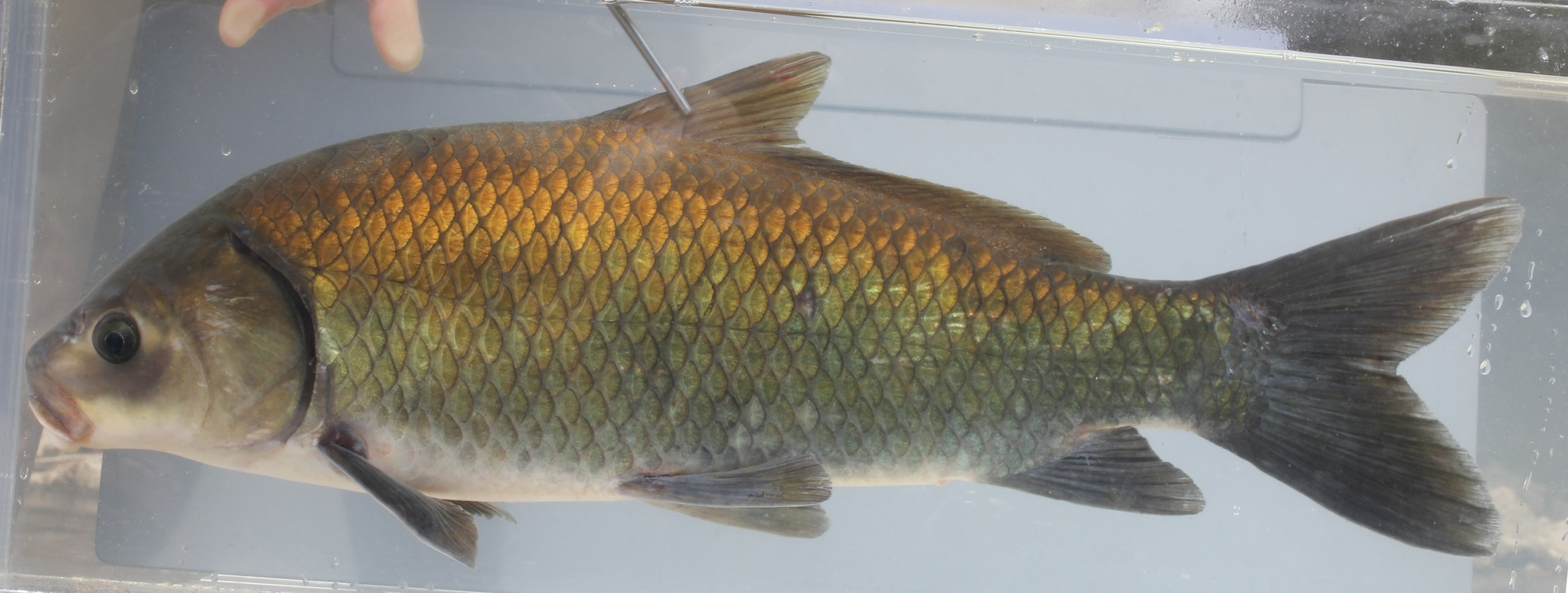
In Illinois

Although historically and derogatorily considered by many to be a rough fish, smallmouth buffalo are native to North American ecosystems, are the most common commercially sold freshwater fish in the United States, are sought after by traditional anglers on rod-and-line, and they have rapidly become sportfish as modernized night bowfishing has become increasingly popular since 2010 - a sport that targets this species among others. Management of this species is in urgent need of reassessment as essentially no agency is tracking the ecological impact of modernized bowfishing, and there are virtually no limits on harvest. The species is highly valued by some as a human food source and the fish meal is common in animal feed. They are relatively quick and easy to raise in commercial farm ponds. Anglers seeking to hook a smallmouth buffalo have found success with doughballs and corn on hooks.

An 82 lb 3 oz (37.3 kg) fish taken from Athens Lake, Texas on May 6, 1993, by angler Randy Collins stands as the International Game Fish Association (IGFA) all-tackle world record for the species, while a 63 cm (2.07 ft) specimen caught on May 16, 2022, in Livingston Lake, Texas by James Schmid is the current IGFA all-tackle length record. The North Carolina state record for smallmouth buffalo is an 88 lb (40 kg) fish caught in Lake Wylie on November 14, 1993, by Tony Crawford, who had previously set the state record with a 61.02 lb (27.68 kg) fish caught at the same lake on December 1, 1991, both through use of packbait. Smallmouth buffalo are not native to eastern North Carolina, but it is not known when they were introduced there.
