= Rice Lake National Wildlife Refuge =

National wildlife refuge in Minnesota, United States

- IUCN category IV (habitat/species management area)
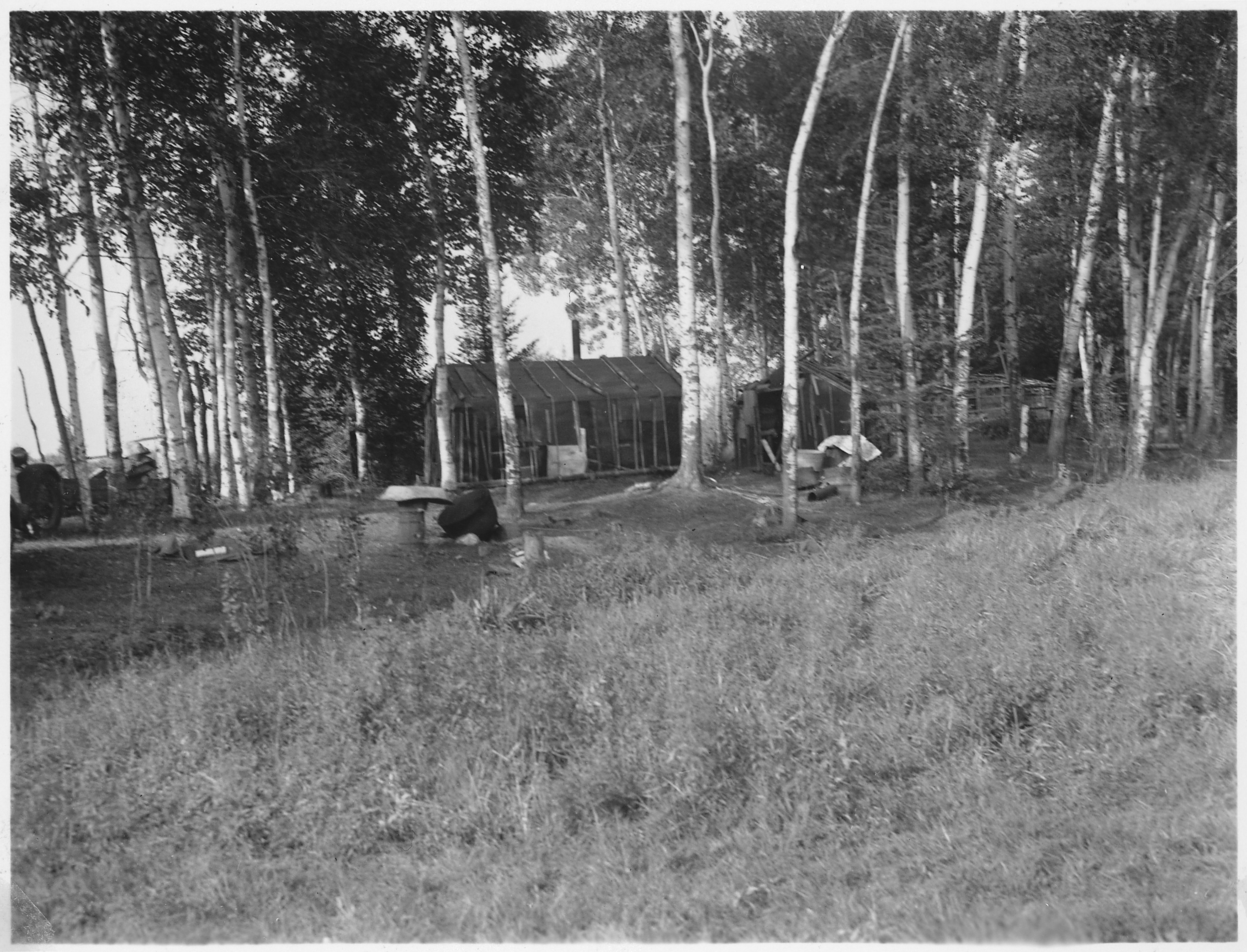
- Rice shacks on Big Rice Lake in 1937

- Location within the United States
- Location: Aitkin County, Minnesota, United States
- Nearest city: McGregor, Minnesota
- Coordinates: 46°31′51″N 93°20′15″W
- Area: 18,208 acres (73.69 km^{2})
- Established: 1935
- Governing body: U.S. Fish and Wildlife Service
- Website: Rice Lake National Wildlife Refuge

Rice Lake National Wildlife Refuge is located in Aitkin County in east central Minnesota, five miles south of the community of McGregor. It was established in 1935 for waterfowl habitat preservation. The refuge includes Rice Lake itself, a shallow, 3,600-acre wild rice-producing lake. The refuge has been designated as a Globally Important Bird Area by the American Bird Conservancy due to the importance of the lake and its wild rice as a food source for migrating waterfowl, especially ring-necked ducks.

Rice Lake National Wildlife Refuge has also recently become known for its population of native bigmouth buffalo that migrate to Rice Lake each spring during their annual spawning migration. With an average age of about 80 years for the bigmouth buffalo in this population and approximately 100% of individuals older than 53 years as of 2024, it is one of the oldest known populations of animals in the world.

It is managed by the U.S. Fish and Wildlife Service for the conservation and, where appropriate, restoration of fish, wildlife and plant resources and their habitats for the benefit of present and future generations of Americans.

The refuge contains 14 miles of scenic roads and more than 7 miles of walking trails.
