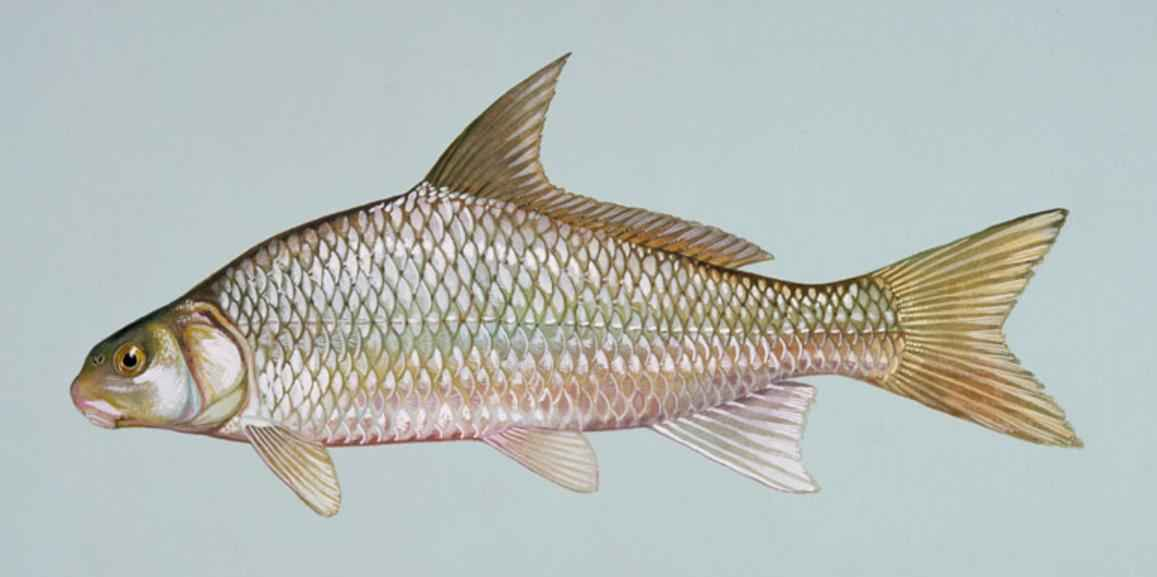
- Carpiodes carpio

Scientific classification
- Kingdom: Animalia
- Phylum: Chordata
- Class: Actinopterygii
- Order: Cypriniformes
- Family: Catostomidae
- Subfamily: Ictiobinae
- Genus: Carpiodes; Rafinesque, 1820

Type species
- Catostomus cyprinus Lesueur, 1817

= Carpiodes =

Genus of fishes

Carpiodes is a genus of suckers found in freshwater in North America, containing species with exceptionally long lifespans for their body size. Long neglected as 'rough fish' in traditional fisheries, in 2025 it was discovered that the three species of carpsucker can live more than 50 years.

== Characteristics ==
The fish in this genus have a long and hook-shaped dorsal fin. They have a silver body and a white to orange pelvic fin. They have a complete lateral line, and have a two-chambered gas chamber. The three species of carpsucker are long-lived freshwater animals, with known maximum lifespans of 52 years (Quillback), and 56 years (Highfin carpsucker and River carpsucker).

== Species ==
There are currently three recognized species in the genus:

- Carpiodes carpio (Rafinesque, 1820) (River carpsucker)
- Carpiodes cyprinus (Lesueur, 1817) (Quillback)
- Carpiodes velifer (Rafinesque, 1820) (Highfin carpsucker)
