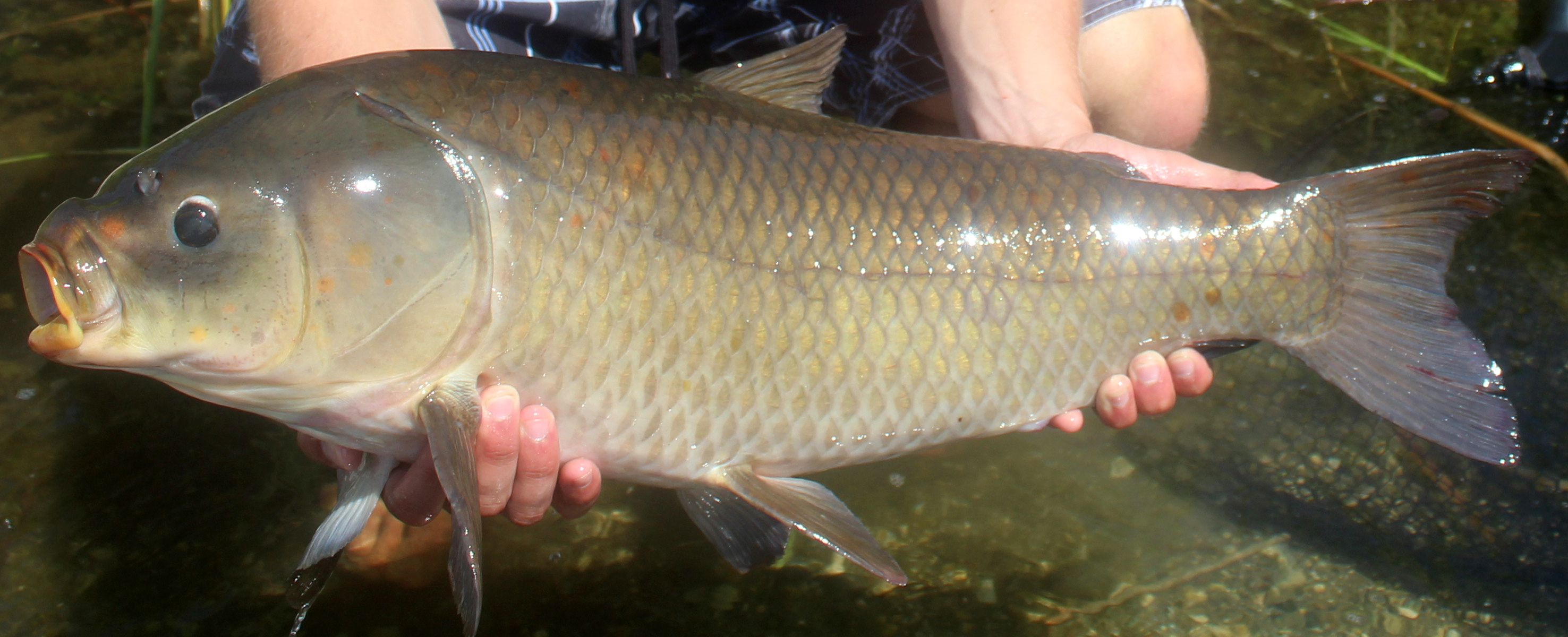
- Bigmouth buffalo male

Conservation status
- Least Concern (IUCN 3.1)

Scientific classification
- Kingdom: Animalia
- Phylum: Chordata
- Class: Actinopterygii
- Division: Teleostei
- Order: Cypriniformes
- Family: Catostomidae
- Genus: Ictiobus
- Species: I. cyprinellus

Binomial name
- Ictiobus cyprinellus (Valenciennes, 1844)

Synonyms
- Sclerognathus cyprinella Valenciennes, 1844

= Bigmouth buffalo =

Species of fish

The bigmouth buffalo (Ictiobus cyprinellus) is a fish native to North America that is in decline. It is the largest North American species in the Catostomidae or "sucker" family, and is one of the longest-lived and latest-maturing freshwater fishes, capable of living 148 years and reproducing infrequently. Even at a century old they show no age-related declines, but instead improvements relative to younger individuals, making this species a biological marvel. It is commonly called the marblehead, redmouth buffalo, buffalofish, bernard buffalo, or roundhead. The bigmouth buffalo is not a carp, nor is any other fish in the sucker family. Although they share the same order, each belong to different suborders and are native to separate continents.

The bigmouth buffalo is typically a brownish olive color with dusky fins, but can vary greatly in color across individuals including melanistic, golden, and even xanthic color morphs. Bigmouth buffalo may also accrue unique black or orange pigmentation markings with age, and in some rare individuals, white-edged fins. Like other catostomids it has a long dorsal fin, but unlike all other extant species it has a terminal (forward-facing) mouth reflecting its unique, pelagic feeding ecology. It is the largest of the buffalofishes and can reach a length of more than 4 ft (1.2 m) and 80 lb (36 kg) in weight. Generally it lives in lakes, or in sluggish areas of large rivers. Bigmouth buffalo populations have been in decline in the northern extent of their range since the 1970s, including Minnesota, North Dakota, and Canada.

A 2019 study documented and validated their late maturity, centenarian longevity, and that several populations in northwestern Minnesota are composed mainly (85–90%) of individuals more than 80 years old, indicating recruitment failure since the 1930s. This newfound life history information published in 2019 defied pre-conceived notions of the species. A 2021 study from North Dakota also revealed a slow pace of life including late maturity, decadal episodic recruitment, declining population, and a relatively large group of old-growth individuals. A 2022 study from Saskatchewan, Canada revealed remarkable tendencies of the bigmouth buffalo including a supercentenarian lifespan, skip-spawning related to water levels, proximate mechanisms underlying failed recruitment, extreme episodic recruitment, and late maturity—all characteristics that make this species extremely vulnerable to overfishing, habitat degradation, and invasive species. Bigmouth buffalo are declining in Canada, and have been in steep decline in contiguous areas of the US, temporally associated with the rise of modern wasteful bowfishing in the 21st century.

Bigmouth buffalo life history attributes, including the ability to survive several decades with no successful recruitment (i.e. episodic recruitment), are more pronounced than other long-lived freshwater fishes, including sturgeon and paddlefish. Such long-lived fish species are periodic strategists and require time to successfully sustain themselves by surviving to periods in which favorable environmental and biotic conditions arise for booms in reproduction and subsequent recruitment through the predation gauntlet. Unregulated, unmanaged and wasteful lethal fisheries are not compatible with their biology, yet such fisheries have come to exist in the 21st century in the United States and the species is declining. Canada on the other hand, has long-enforced protections for bigmouth buffalo. Exemplifying the lack of management in the United States, as of 2025 anglers with a standard fishing license in Minnesota can take bigmouth buffalo in unlimited numbers statewide, including from within a National Wildlife Refuge system of the United States Fish and Wildlife Service. A 2024 study set in eastern Minnesota analyzed the population of bigmouth buffalo and their spawning migration at Rice Lake National Wildlife Refuge across years. Although the population of bigmouth buffalo migrates and spawns annually, a major pulse of successful reproduction has not occurred since the late 1950s. With a median age of 79 years as of 2024, and greater than 99.7% of individuals hatched before 1972, these bigmouth buffalo at Rice Lake National Wildlife Refuge make up one of the oldest known populations of animal on earth.

== Geographic distribution ==
The bigmouth buffalo's native distribution is confined to the countries of Canada and the United States of America. It is native to the Red River of the North and Mississippi River drainage basins, from Manitoba, Canada, and North Dakota, United States, to the Ohio River and south in the Mississippi River system to Texas and Alabama. In Canada, they inhabit the Milk River which flows through Alberta, and the Qu'Appelle River which flows through Saskatchewan and Manitoba into Lake Winnipeg. Beginning in the northern United States, they are native to Montana, North Dakota, Minnesota, Wisconsin, to southern states including eastern Texas, Oklahoma and Louisiana. The major systems where they are found include the Hudson Bay and Mississippi River drainages. The introduction of bigmouth buffalo has largely been done for commercial purposes. Regions of reintroductions include some reservoirs along the Missouri River drainage of North Dakota and Montana. Regions of introduction include some reservoirs in Arizona, and within California, they have also been introduced to the aqueduct system of Los Angeles.

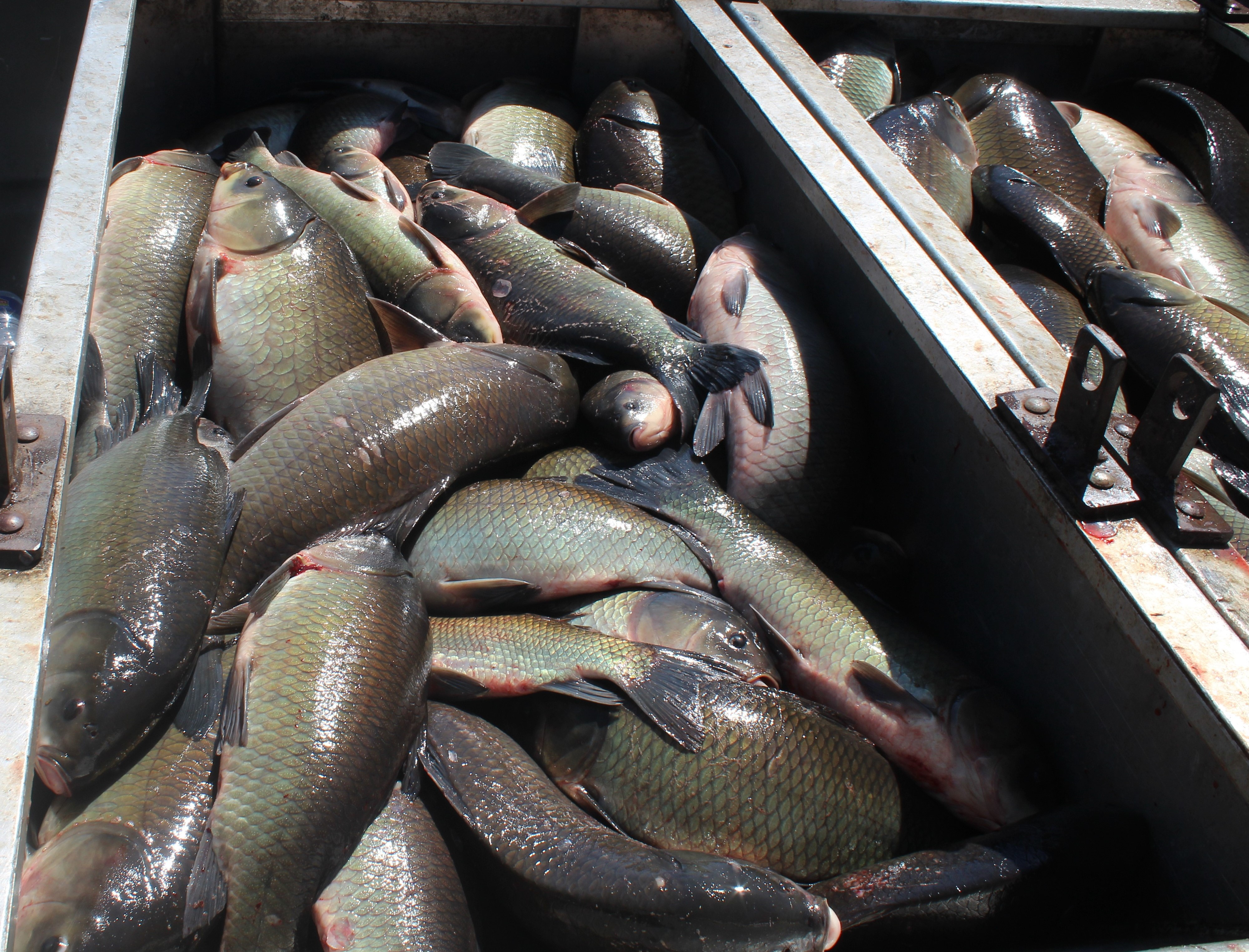
Commercial harvest of bigmouth buffalo for food is a declining niche market. Fish are netted and then kept living in well-oxygenated tanks and trucked to markets in the US where they are sold alive.

Bigmouth buffalo - oldest confirmed freshwater fish

== Ecological, cultural, and economic importance ==
Native to North America, bigmouth buffalo are integral to ecosystems therein. Bigmouth buffalo young are prey for several predatory fish, including walleye, northern pike, catfish, alligator gar, etc. Bigmouth buffalo filter-feed on invasive zebra mussels during the mollusk's larval (veliger) planktonic stage. They form the native counterpart to the invasive bighead and silver carp, and they compete with the invasive common carp. However, these invasive species are outcompeting native bigmouth buffalo. Native Americans utilized bigmouth buffalo, Lewis and Clark harvested them on their journey in 1804, and the inland commercial fishing industry has valued them as a prized catch since the 1800s. The bigmouth buffalo is a popular foodfish throughout parts of the United States, and has been introduced into a few southwestern states. Commercial harvesters have to obtain annual permits to net from designated waterbodies, which are rotated among on a year-by-year basis, and they must report harvest from each haul to their respective state agency. Bigmouth buffalo are then trucked in oxygenated water tanks to markets where they are sold alive. They are commonly consumed in Arkansas as buffalo ribs. Though it has small bones suspended in its muscle tissue like northern pike, its good flavor makes it one of the most valuable of the traditional, non-game freshwater fish. In addition to being a foodfish, the bigmouth buffalo has recently become a sportfish as catch-and-release anglers have learned to pursue them on rod-and-line, and as lethal bowfishing has also increased in the 21st century. Although commercial harvest is regulated, sport-kill bowfishing is not.

== Ecology ==
Bigmouth buffalo young feeding on plankton. Juvenile bigmouth buffalo are preyed on by predatory fish, such as walleye, northern pike and catfish.

The bigmouth buffalo is part of a unique ecology in shallow-water systems. The larval bigmouths are pelagic and sometimes benthic feeders, mostly of copepods and cladocerans, but also phytoplankton and chironomids. Bigmouth buffalo, unlike its close relatives the black and smallmouth buffalos, is a filter-feeder, using its very fine gill rakers to strain plankton from the water. It sometimes feeds near the bottom, using short up-and down movements to filter from the water the plankton that hover near the bottom or rest lightly on it. The juveniles and adults are mostly limnetic plankton feeders that also eat cladocerans, copepods, algae, chironomids, ostracods, and other insect larvae and invertebrates depending on availability. The optimum habitat for spawning bigmouth buffalo is freshly-flooded vegetated waters. They are a very resilient fish that can tolerate high turbidity and low oxygen levels. They can be found in waters with turbidity levels over 100 ppm. During spring and summer, 50–75% pools should be present, with backwaters, and marsh areas and 25–75% littoral area and protected embayments during summer for the habitat to be suitable. Bigmouth can be found in waters from 22.5 to 38.0 °C (72.5 to 100.4 °F). The optimal temperatures for incubation and hatching of eggs are from 15–18 °C (59–64 °F), but they can develop in temperatures reaching up to 26.7 °C (80.1 °F). The bigmouth buffalo prefers slow-moving water that does not reach a velocity over 30 cm/s.

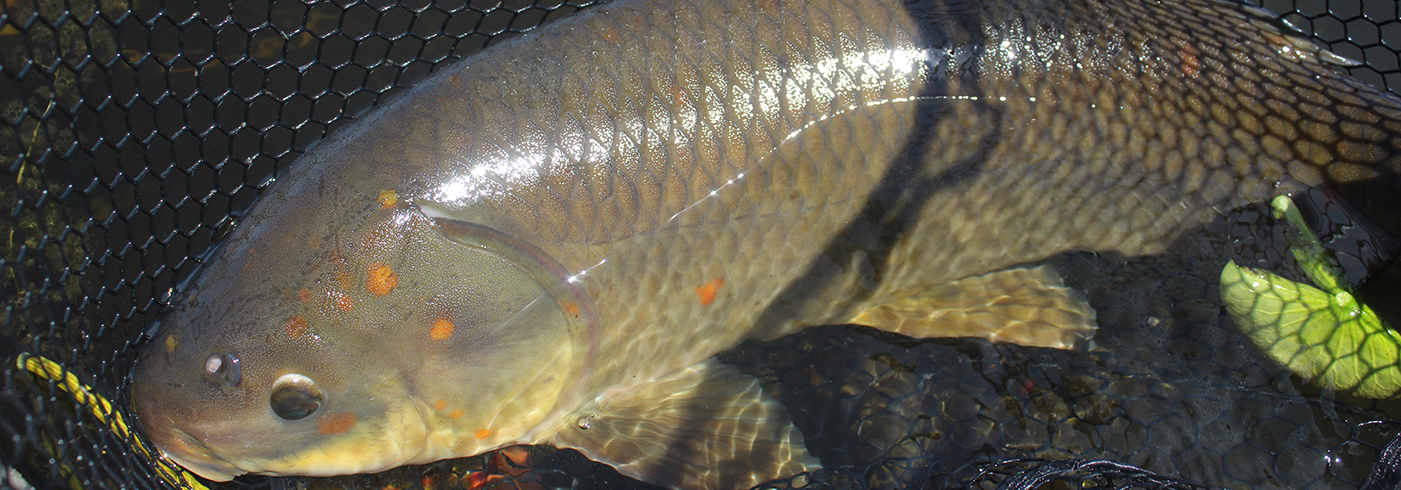
A 90-year-old male bigmouth buffalo with orange spots

The bigmouth buffalo are group spawners which produce 250,000 eggs/kg of adult weight; their eggs are very small at about 1.5 mm in diameter. The bigmouth buffalo is a spring spawner generally spawning between April and June when the water temperature is between 13 and 26 °C (55 and 79 °F), but may skip spawning if water-level fluctuations are not adequate. The bigmouth buffalo is a broadcaster that has adhesive eggs, which it lays in vegetated waters. Females seek submergent and emergent vegetation, the ideal habitat for the hatching of their eggs. Water levels substantially rise before spawning, and the spawning timing and duration can vary significantly across years, even in successive years. For example, at Rice Lake National Wildlife Refuge, Aitkin County, Minnesota, the spawning duration was 7 times longer in 2022 compared to 2021 or 2023, and the spawning timing also varied by more than 16 days comparing 2022 to 2021. Bigmouth buffalo are extremely vulnerable to exploitation during their spawning period, and will likely require protections much like is afforded to lake sturgeon or paddlefish.

Salinity can be a problem for reproduction. Spawning can occur from 1.4 to 2.0 ppt of salinity which eggs and yearlings not being able to survive a salinity of over 9 ppt. The minimum dissolved oxygen during the spring and summer is 5 mg/L.

Recruitment success is related to water-level and drought conditions, the water-level recession rate after the spring peak, and predation. While numerous invertebrates, blue gill, yellow perch, and other species prey on the bigmouth buffalo eggs and larvae, northern pike and other piscivorous fish likely further top-down restrict the survival bigmouth buffalo fry and fingerling fish in many systems. More than one male will assist in spawning by moving the female to the top of the water to help mix eggs and milt.

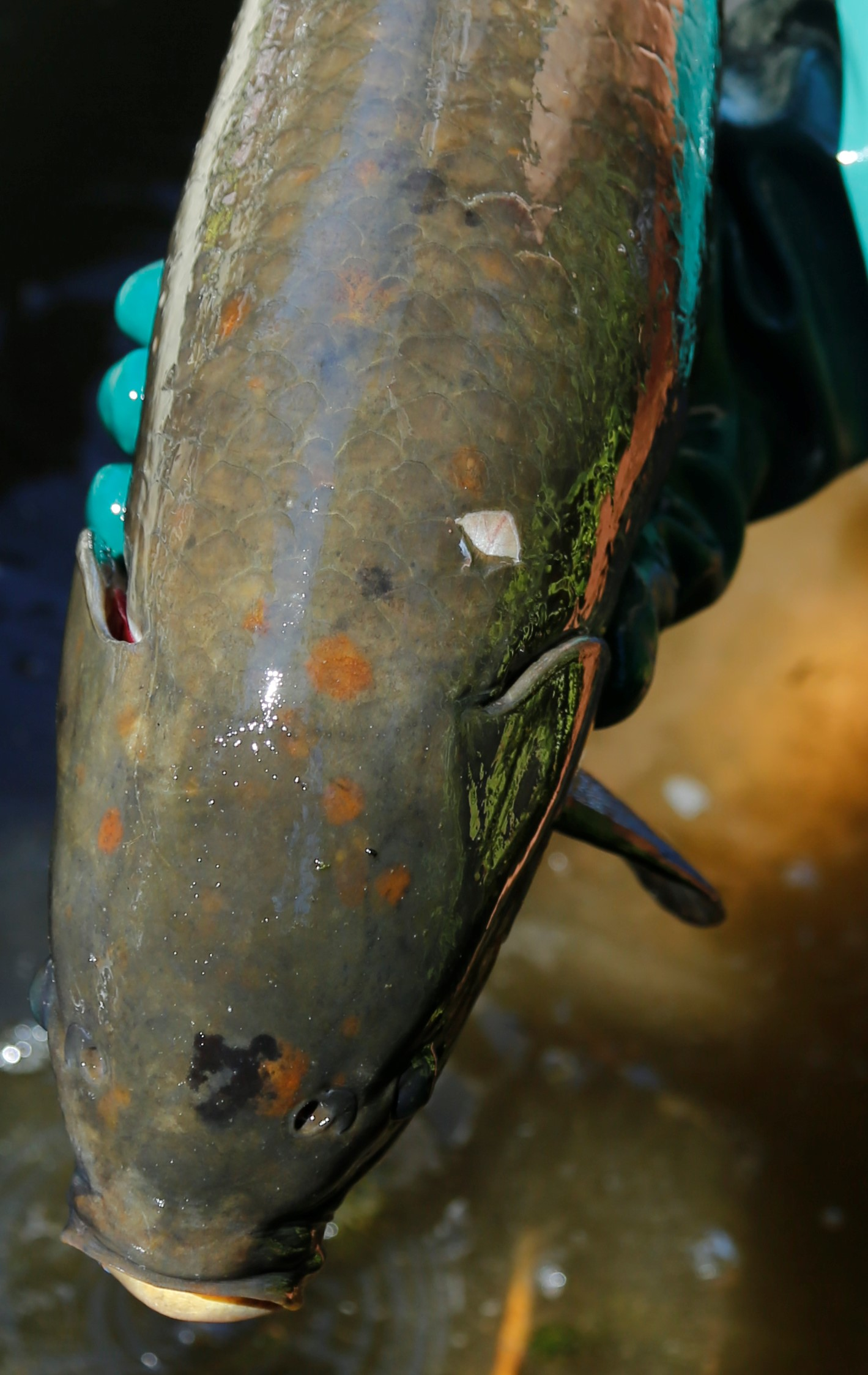
Another extremely old bigmouth buffalo with both black and orange spots. Both types of spotting accrue and intensify with age, but may vary by habitat.

== Life history ==
Reaching a recorded maximum of 148 years of age, the bigmouth buffalo is the longest living freshwater teleost (a group of more than 12,000 species) by more than 50 years, shattering all previous records for this group. With a previous maximum longevity estimate (prior to 2019) for this species at 26 years, evidence of its extended longevity came as a surprise and was initially met with skepticism. Thorough bomb radiocarbon dating was conducted on their otolith microstructure and confirmed the age estimates generated from thin-sectioned otoliths, making bigmouth buffalo the oldest age-validated freshwater fish in the world.

The onset of sexual maturity of bigmouth buffalo varies with latitude. In central North Dakota and southern Minnesota, females reach the onset of sexual maturation around 10 years old, while males begin maturation around 6 years of age. In Canada, bigmouth buffalo females had not yet reached the onset of sexual maturity by an age of 11 years. Their delayed maturity, great longevity, high fecundity yet little investment per egg, no parental care, and resulting episodic recruitment, are phenomena representative of the periodic strategist - their slow, marathon-like, life history pace. Bigmouth buffalo also have a tendency to accumulate unique pigmentation (orange and black spots) as they age, which may vary by habitat variables such as water quality and available food.

== Conservation status ==
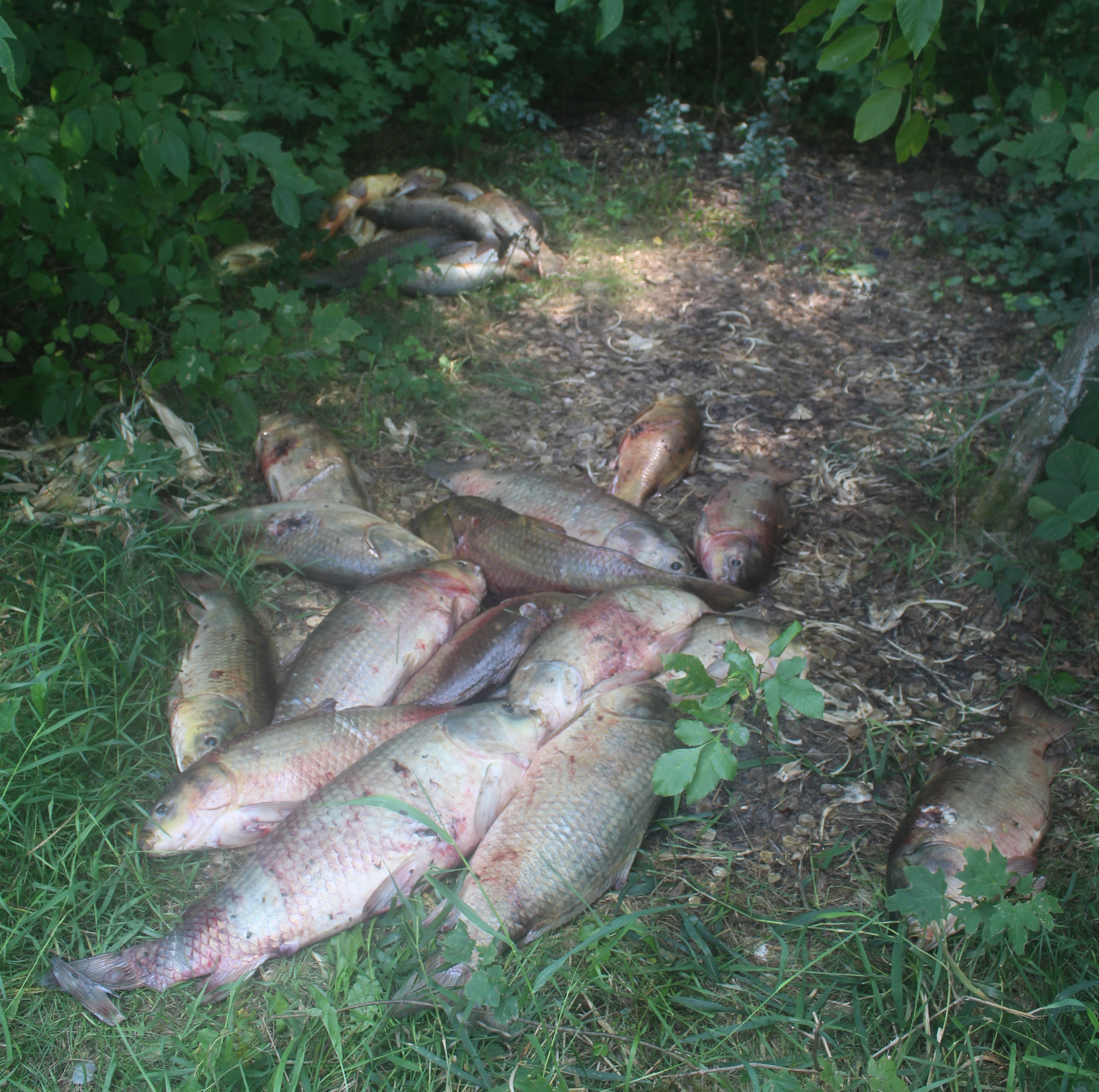
A discarded waste pile of bigmouth buffalo shot by bow and arrow, indicative of unregulated, wasteful bowfishing

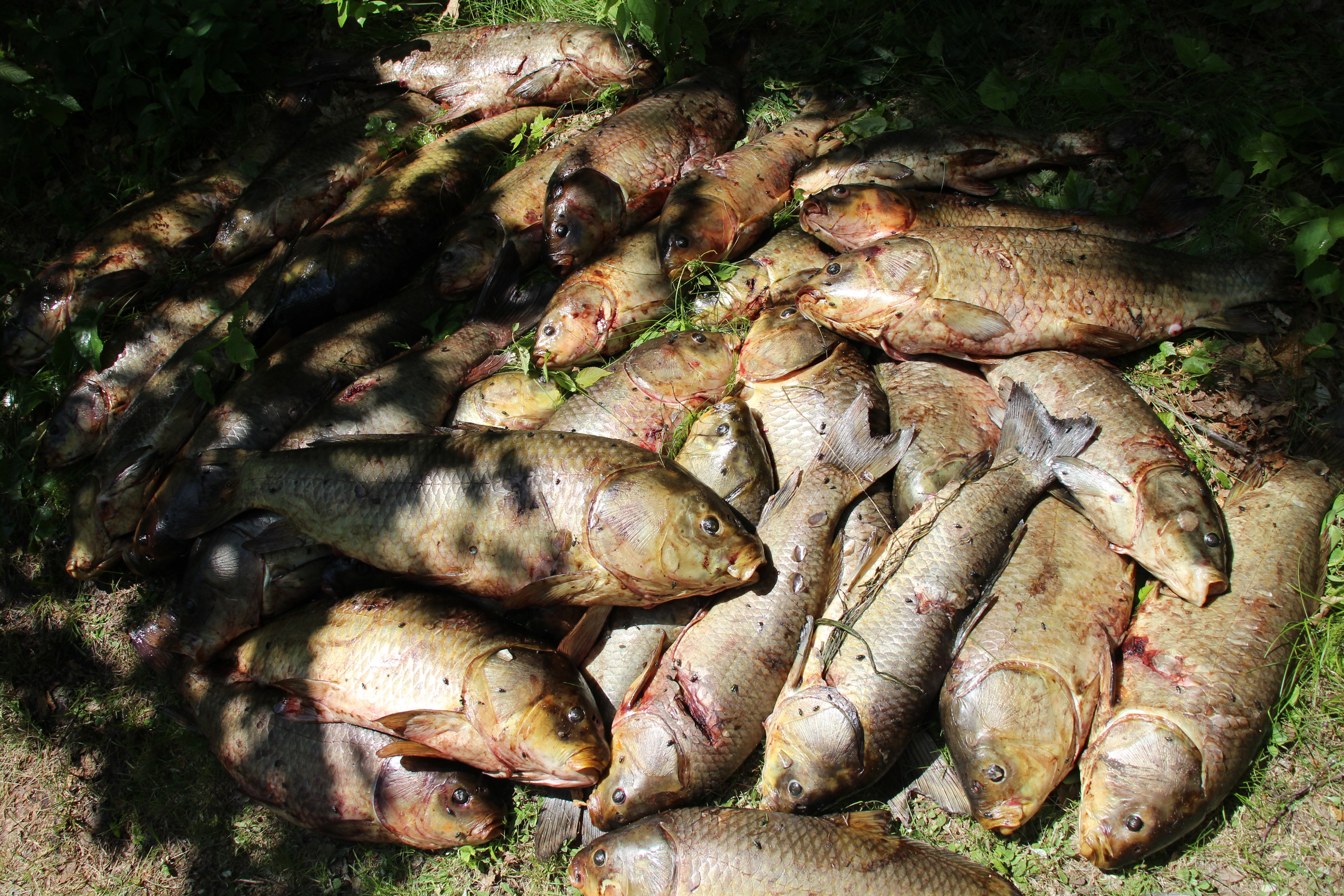
From Scarnecchia et al. 2021: A pile of 32 bigmouth buffalo shot by bow and arrow in Minnesota in 2020 and left as waste. This one night of bowfishing resulted in more than 2,500 life-years taken. The median age of these buffalofish was 89 years old.

According to the Committee on the Status of Endangered Wildlife in Canada, the conservation status in the Canadian range of the bigmouth buffalo is difficult to assess due to lack of study of this animal, and the species is of special concern under the Species at Risk Act. Known threats include loss of backwater spawning areas due to channelization and loss of spawn viability due to high turbidity related to variation in flow rate. The bigmouth buffalo is also negatively affected by dams that restrict their movement and ability to find suitable spawning habitat, they are prone to winterkill, and they are highly vulnerable to overfishing. The bigmouth buffalo is an endangered fish species in Pennsylvania. Besides this state, the bigmouth buffalo is not currently listed as threatened or endangered in any other region of its native distribution, although the Saskatchewan - Nelson River populations designatable unit has been listed under Schedule 1 of the Species at Risk Act as being of special concern since 2011 due to contiguous declines that have also been evident in the northern extent of their US range since the 1970s. Several longstanding MN populations of bigmouth buffalo are composed almost totally (85–90%) of individuals hatched before 1940, and in other systems more than 99% of individuals are from hatch-years that pre-date 1970. A reflection of outdated fisheries management, harvest limits on bigmouth buffalo do not exist in these same areas - this despite the rapidly growing new sport of modernized night bowfishing that exploits this species. The rise of bowfishing was found to be coincident with steep declines in bigmouth buffalo.

The fingerlings of bigmouth buffalo are susceptible to a parasite, Lernea cyprinacae, but most are unaffected by the time they reach a length of 30 mm. They are anchor parasites that attach themselves between scale margins and fin insertions. The real problem is a secondary infection that may arise due to these parasites, especially in poor water conditions. The protozoan Epistylis and bacteria Flavobacterium columnare are both related to serious parasite infestations. The bigmouth has been seen to hybridize in the wild with smallmouth buffalo, and it is possible that some fish identified as black buffalo are indeed these hybrids. The hybridization does not seem to be negatively affecting their populations but makes it difficult to determine how many hybrids and how many black buffalo are actually in certain reservoirs. The fish is vulnerable in shallow water and is often captured by bow and arrow via bowfishing. It is commercially caught on trotlines, setlines, hoop and trammel nets, and seines. There are currently no specific management plans in place for the bigmouth buffalo in the United States. In some places like the southern US, progeny have been reared in hatcheries.

Management of bigmouth buffalo is in need of attention, especially in the northern part of their US range where populations are old-growth and declining. Overall, the International Union for Conservation of Nature did not consider bigmouth buffalo to be at risk of extinction in its 2013 assessment, which came before recent developments in the understanding of the life history of Ictobius cyprinellus.

== Fishing ==
On June 21, 2013, Noah LaBarge (12 years old) caught the Wisconsin state record bigmouth buffalo fish. It measured 49.5 inches (126 cm) and weighed 76.5 pounds (34.7 kg). It was caught on 8-lb-test line on the Wisconsin River at Devil's Elbow, which is on the north end of the Petenwell Flowage. It was officially recognized to be the new world record by the National Fresh Water Fishing Hall of Fame as both 8-lb-line class and all tackle.

At Mt. Juliet, Tennessee, Jeff Wilkins caught a record 62-pound (28 kg) bigmouth buffalo while fishing on Percy Priest Lake. The fish, caught in the Seven Points area of the lake on March 31, 2010, was 45 inches (110 cm) in length. According to the Tennessee Wildlife Resources Agency, it took 35 minutes for Wilkins to reel in the fish. The catch beat the previous record of 52 pounds 2 ounces (23.6 kg), caught by Greg Megibben in 2001, also at Percy Priest. After the record was certified, Wilkins released the fish back into the lake.

In Omaha, Nebraska, Joe Slavic caught a 64-pound (29 kg) bigmouth buffalo using mulberry bait on June 8, 2000 in a Dodge County sand pit.

The International Game Fish Association all-tackle record stands at 31.89 kilograms (70.3 lb), caught on April 21, 1980 by Delbert Sisk in Bastrop, Louisiana.

== See also ==
- Haff disease
