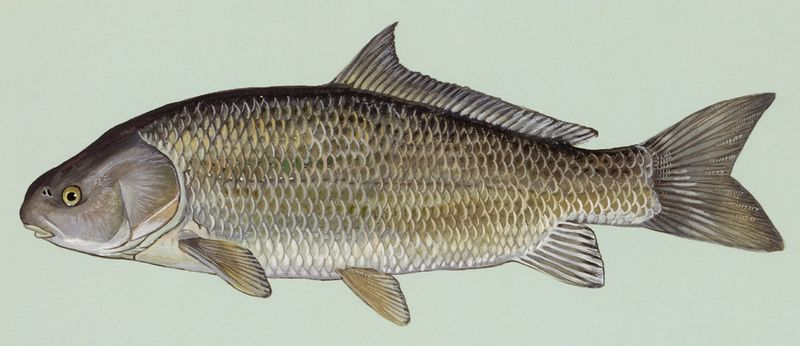

Conservation status
- Least Concern (IUCN 3.1)

Scientific classification
- Kingdom: Animalia
- Phylum: Chordata
- Class: Actinopterygii
- Division: Teleostei
- Order: Cypriniformes
- Family: Catostomidae
- Genus: Ictiobus
- Species: I. niger

Binomial name
- Ictiobus niger (Rafinesque, 1819)

Synonyms
- Amblodon niger Rafinesque, 1819

= Black buffalo =

Species of fish

The black buffalo (Ictiobus niger) is a North American species of freshwater fish in the Catostomidae or sucker family. With a lifespan of up to 108 years, it is among the longest-lived of freshwater fish species. Found in the Mississippi Basin and southern Great Lakes. It was first discovered in Canada in the western end of Lake Erie and has been reported from Boston Creek. The Tennessee distribution ranges from rivers and streams in the Cumberland Mountains, a few rivers in middle Tennessee, and in west Tennessee along the Mississippi River. The ecology of the species is quite similar to that of I. bubalus. I. niger has a ventrally positioned mouth, making the species’ diet benthic-oriented. It has a distinct body shape and a mouth position that is intermediate between those of I. bubalus and I. cyprinellus. It is distinguished with some difficulty from the former species by its smaller relative eye size and more streamlined body shape.

== Geographic distribution ==
I. niger is found in large and small rivers in eastern North America from the Mississippi Basin to Canada. In Canada, the species was first described in Lake Erie. In the United States, the species is found in both small and large rivers in the basins of the Mississippi, Missouri, and Ohio as well as in southern Lake Michigan and Lake Erie. Among others, it is native to Iowa, South Dakota and Minnesota; more southern states include eastern Texas and Oklahoma.

== Ecology ==
The ecology of I. niger is most closely related to I. cyprinellus. Due to the ventrally positioned mouth, the diet is benthic-oriented, with the Asiatic clam being the principal food. Detritus and sand are also ingested and contribute about 40% of the dietary volume. It is most commonly found in quiet, shallow waters. The U.S. angling record is 55.5 lb (25.2 kg) and was caught in Tennessee in 1984. The typical length is about 20–30 in (51–76 cm) with a maximum length of 48.5 in (123 cm). The typical weight is estimated to be about 10–30 lb (4.5–13.6 kg). A specimen caught in Shelby County, Tennessee, on April 1, 1980, was accepted as valid and weighed 80 lb (36 kg). I. niger relies on benthic organisms more heavily than I. bubalus. I. niger feeds mostly from the bottom.

== Life history ==
Members of Ictiobus are large, robust-bodied suckers adapted to large rivers. Currently recognized species are readily diagnosed by morphological characters, and the group is known from fossils dating back to the Miocene. I. niger is a spring spawner. They spawn in flooded areas and backwaters of sloughs and small to large rivers. Fertilized eggs are demersal and adhesive. They hatch in 24–36 hours at 19–24 °C (66–75 °F). I. niger grows fairly rapidly, averaging 13.4 cm (5.3 in) after the first year. Black buffalo are reported to reach sexual maturity by the second year in the southern United States. The spawning period could take days, as its duration is not well established. One report of spawning buffalofish, believed to be I. niger, was made in Leflore County, Mississippi in the flood plain of the Yazoo River on April 21, 1930, when hundreds of buffalofish staged in flooded scrub along the margins of a cypress–tupelo swamp. According to observer Lee E. Yeager, the fish were insensitive to disturbance, swam into extremely shallow water not deep enough to cover their bodies and occasionally made small jumps. At three days "pale green to yellowish green" weakly aggregated egg masses were still visible, but many had been completely exposed by receding waters and turned blackish as they dried. The black buffalo can live for more than a century, and thus like other buffalofish species, the black buffalo is extremely long-lived.

== Relationship with people ==
No specific plan exists for protection for this species in Canada other than the Fisheries Act. However, I. niger is listed as of special concern in Kentucky, Mississippi, South Dakota, and West Virginia. It has also been listed as protected in Wisconsin. From 1957 to 1959, only seven specimens were recorded in the Ohio River. In 1968–69, only four specimens were captured. Threats and issues include loss, bowfishing, modification or fragmentation of large river habitat caused by dams in the Mississippi and Wisconsin Rivers. Mistaken identity leads to the taking of this species in commercial fisheries. The exotic bighead carp shares the habitat with I. niger and consumes large amounts of zooplankton, outcompeting I. niger for needed food. The IGFA all tackle world record for the species stands at 63lbs 6oz caught from the Mississippi River in Iowa in 1999.

== Management recommendations ==
To ensure the long life and thriving reproduction of I. niger, protection and restoration of larger river habitat is needed. Education of anglers, biologists, and the general public in taxonomy, systematics, and habitat use is needed. The species presents special difficulties, due to natural hybridization, for both research and enforcement. Dams need to be equipped with fish passages to connect fragmented habitats, invasive species that compete or degrade the habitat of native fishes need to be controlled, and bowfishing and commercial fishing need to be managed.
