= Highfin carpsucker =

Conservation status
- Least Concern (IUCN 3.1)

- Apparently Secure (NatureServe)

Scientific classification
- Kingdom: Animalia
- Phylum: Chordata
- Class: Actinopterygii
- Order: Cypriniformes
- Family: Catostomidae
- Genus: Carpiodes
- Species: C. velifer

Binomial name
- Carpiodes velifer (Rafinesque, 1820)

Synonyms
- Catostomus velifer Rafinesque, 1820

Species of fish

The highfin carpsucker (Carpiodes velifer) is a long-lived freshwater fish found in the southeastern and midwestern United States. The smallest of the carpsuckers, its usual habitat is medium to large-size rivers where it is mostly found 1 to 3 metres (3 to 10 ft) beneath the surface. It is a silvery fish with a prominent dorsal fin, which grows to an average adult length of 36 centimetres (14 in), and a known maximum age of 56 years. It is considered to reach the onset of sexual maturity at the age of three and females have 41,644 to 62,355 ova each. This fish forages on sandy or gravelly bottoms for such small invertebrates as crustaceans, protozoa and mollusks as well as filamentous algae. Young fish are preyed on by northern pike, muskellunge, walleye and largemouth bass and larger fish are caught by recreational fishermen. The highfin carpsucker competes with catfish and does not thrive in rivers with high levels of siltation.

== Description ==
Adult highfin carpsucker are generally around 36 centimetres (14 in) long, with a maximum recorded length of 50 centimetres (20 in). A silvery fish, it receives its specific name "velifer" from its exceptionally long dorsal fin. In 2025 it was discovered that the highfin carpsucker can live for more than 50 years.

== Distribution ==
Highfin carpsuckers can be found throughout most of the eastern part of the United States and partially west of the Mississippi River. They have a traditional temperate-water distribution and are most commonly found between 46 and 31°N. They can inhabit waters from South Dakota, Minnesota, Wisconsin, and south along the Mississippi River drainage to Louisiana, but are not found in the northeast portion of the United States. They can also be found in the Lake Michigan drainages. The highfin carpsucker has been introduced in the Santee River and along Cape Fear in North Carolina. Highfin carpsuckers are generally found in large- to moderate-sized rivers. This species is found in medium-depth water (4 to 10 ft (1.2 to 3.0 m)) usually in areas with rocky gravel substrates. They tend to stay in more shallow water than most carpsuckers and do not go in smaller streams like the quillback.

== Ecology ==
Their diet includes an assortment of small crustaceans, protozoa, filamentous algae, and other aquatic invertebrates such as crayfish and snails. This species prefers to feed in large to moderately sized rivers, but usually stays closer to the bank than the open river channel. However, it is not common for the highfin carpsucker to be found in very shallow water. Northern pike, muskellunge, walleye, and largemouth bass have been known to prey on the highfin carpsucker. However, humans are still the most significant predator this species encounters.

The highfin carpsucker does not tolerate very much change in the water velocity and prefers to stay in moderate to swift currents. This species feeds and thrives in areas with a consistent sandy or rocky gravel substrate. Siltation can cause a variety of problems for this species, and some of the other species with which the highfin directly competes. Catfish and other carps are their toughest competitors. Some of these species possibly survive in the same areas, but the highfin carpsucker does best without much competition. The highfin carpsucker is a native member to the central drainages of the United States, and are thus an integral component to the ecosystems they reside in. Fisheries depend on them to keep the environment in check so it can support more marketable game species.

== Lifecycle ==
It is unknown at what age the highfin carpsucker becomes sexually mature, and it likely varies with latitude, but it is possibly around 3-6 years of age based on recent assessment of their growth. The first analysis of otoliths from the species, structures used by scientists to estimate accurate age in fish, found that they can live more than six times longer than previously reported. With a known maximum age of 56 years, the highfin carpsucker can live about two times longer than any other freshwater fish of similar body size. The highfin carpsucker is the smallest species of carpsucker. Across their long lives, the highfin carpsucker exhibit variable recruitment, low natural mortality, and asymptotic growth with males smaller than females. Highfin carpsuckers breed when temperatures are around 55–77 °F (13–25 °C). Males develop nuptial tubercles. Highfins have a lengthy spawning period and in Ohio were found spawning from late June–September. They only breed once a year, not again in the fall like some species.

Highfin carpsuckers migrate locally, but are not considered a migratory species.
