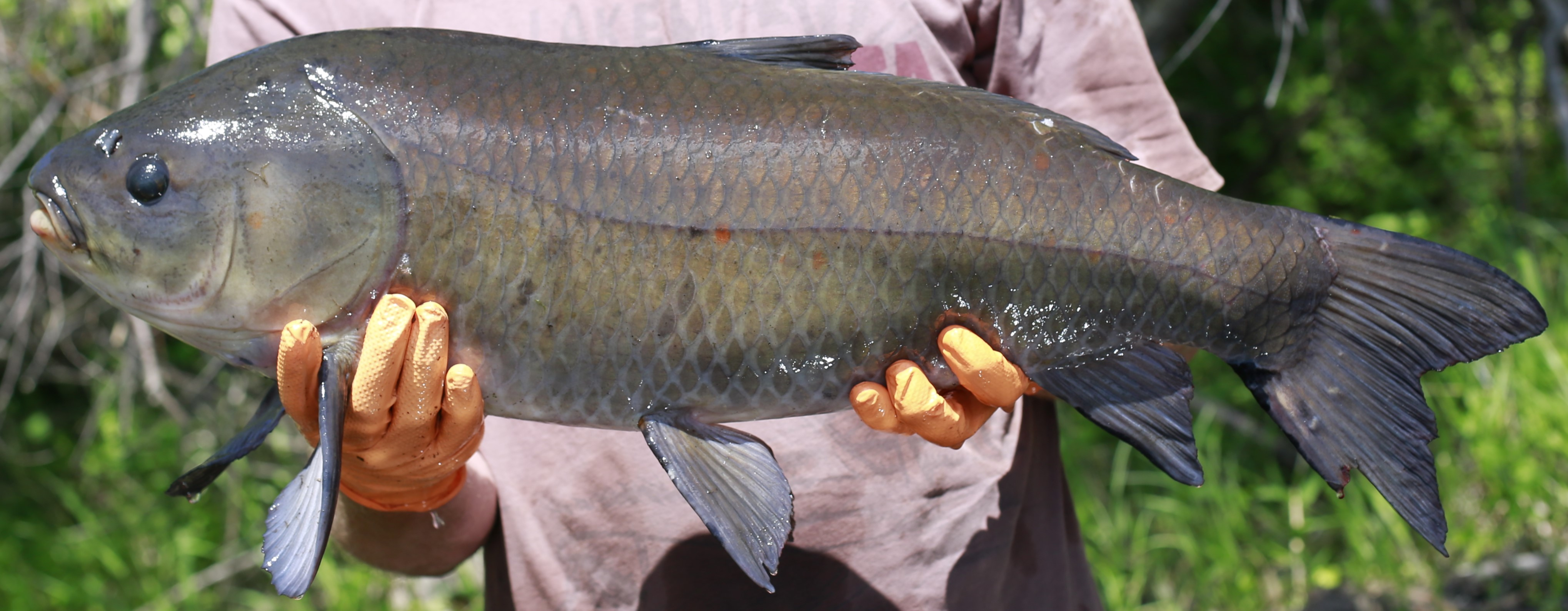
- A centenarian Bigmouth buffalo, Ictiobus cyprinellus

Scientific classification
- Kingdom: Animalia
- Phylum: Chordata
- Class: Actinopterygii
- Order: Cypriniformes
- Family: Catostomidae
- Subfamily: Ictiobinae
- Genus: Ictiobus; Rafinesque, 1820

Type species
- Catostomus bubalus Rafinesque, 1818

Species
- See text

Synonyms
- Amblodon Rafinesqu, 1819; Bubalichthys Agassiz, 1855; Megastomatobus Fowler, 1913

= Ictiobus =

Genus of fishes

Ictiobus, also known as buffalofishes, buffalofish or simply buffalo, is a genus of freshwater fish native to North America, specifically the United States, Canada, Mexico, and Guatemala. They are the largest and longest-lived of the North American suckers, reaching up to 1.23 m (4.0 ft) in length and more than 100 years of age for three of the five species. At up to 127 years for bigmouth buffalo, they are the longest-lived freshwater teleost, which is a group of more than 12,000 species. Bigmouth buffalo, black buffalo and smallmouth buffalo are found in the United States or Canada. Little is known about the two other buffalofish species: the fleshylip buffalo found in Mexico, or the usumacinta buffalo found in Mexico and Guatemala. Buffalofish are not carp, nor is any other catostomid; they belong to different scientific families having evolved on separate continents. Buffalofish live in most types of freshwater bodies where panfish are found, such as ponds, creeks, rivers, and lakes. Ictiobus were caught by the Lewis and Clark Expedition.

From an angler's point of view, buffalofish were historically not popular game fish because they were considered difficult to catch by hook and line (even though they put up a great fight), but recently developed rod-and-line fishing techniques catch buffalofish with consistency. In the 21st Century unregulated sport killing by bow and arrow has emerged and has quickly made them easy targets of night bowfishing. They are now de facto game fish across much of their range, are in decline, and protective measures are needed.

== Species ==
Five species are placed in the genus:

- Ictiobus bubalus (Rafinesque, 1818) (smallmouth buffalo)
- Ictiobus cyprinellus (Valenciennes, 1844) (bigmouth buffalo)
- Ictiobus labiosus (Meek, 1904) (fleshylip buffalo)
- Ictiobus meridionalis (Günther, 1868) (Usumacinta buffalo)
- Ictiobus niger (Rafinesque, 1819) (black buffalo)

== See also ==
- Haff disease
