= List of fishes of Vermont =

The location of the State of Vermont in the United States of America.

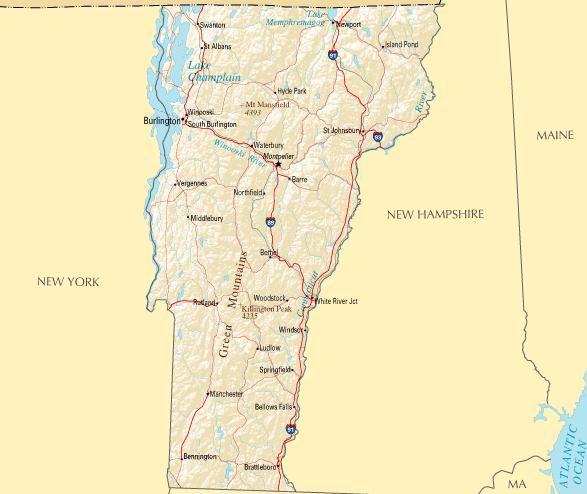
Topographic map of Vermont

There are approximately 92 species of fish that have been recorded in the U.S. State of Vermont. 11 of which are introduced. The main source for this list is Fishes of Vermont, a list created by the Vermont Fish & Wildlife. The following tags note species in each of those categories:

- (I) - Introduced
- (Ex) - Extirpated

== Background ==
Vermont is the smallest landlocked state in the U.S. and is located in the New England region, bordering Quebec to the north, New York and New Hampshire to the west and east, and Massachusetts to the south. Lake Champlain is shared with New York and Quebec and is the 8th largest natural freshwater lake in the contiguous United States and the largest lake in Vermont. Vermont's eastern border is the Connecticut River, the longest river in New England. Vermont's hydrology is largely composed of cold mountain streams and deep alpine lakes and is made out of four drainage basins; the Hudson, Connecticut, Champlain, and Saint-François drainage basins, all of which flow into the Atlantic Ocean either via the Gulf of Saint Lawrence, Long Island Sound, or New York Bay.

== Order Petromyzontiformes (Lampreys) ==
Family Petromyzontidae (Northern lampreys)

- Northern brook lamprey (Ichthyomyzon fossor)
- Silver lamprey (Ichthyomyzon unicuspis)
- American brook lamprey (Lethenteron appendix)
- Sea lamprey (Petromyzon marinus)

== Order Acipenseriformes (Sturgeons & paddlefish) ==
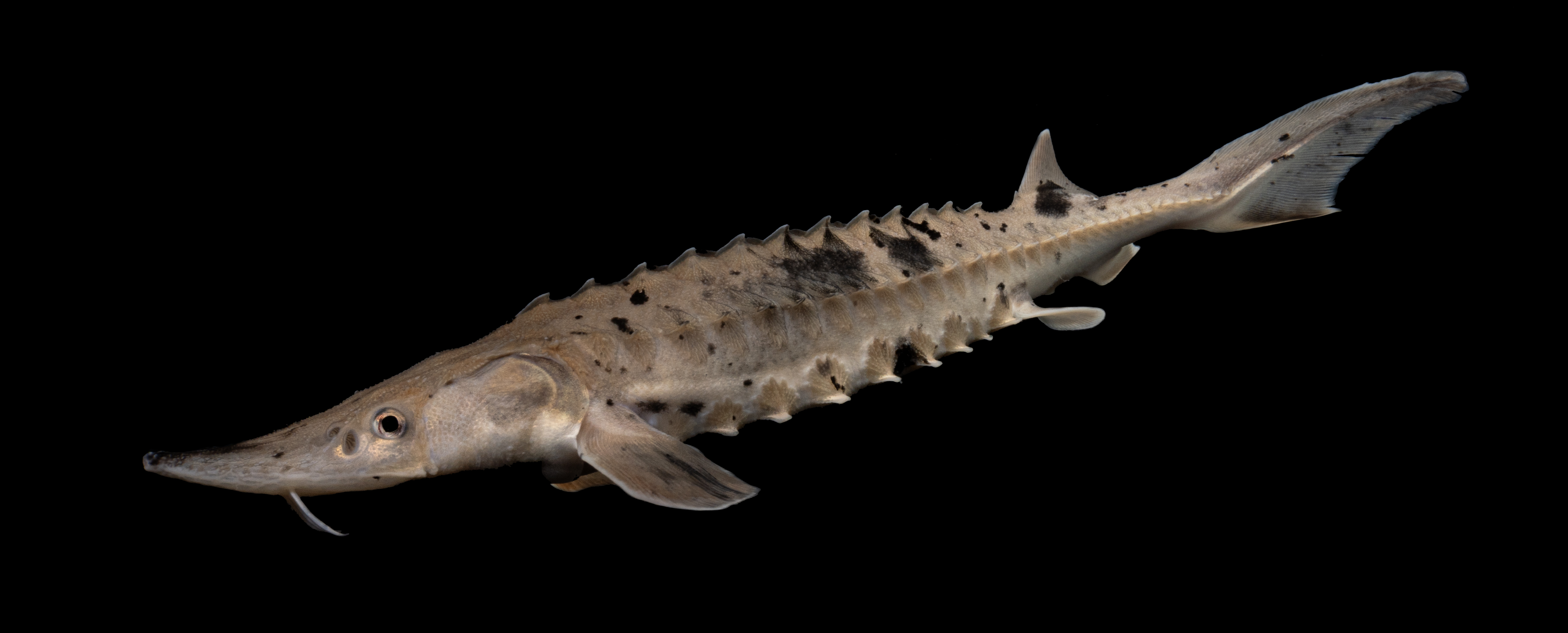
Lake sturgeon

Family Acipenseridae (Sturgeons)

- Lake sturgeon (Acipenser fulvescens)

== Order Lepisosteiformes (Gars) ==
Family Lepisosteidae (Gars)

- Longnose gar (Lepisosteus osseus)

== Order Amiiformes (Bowfins) ==
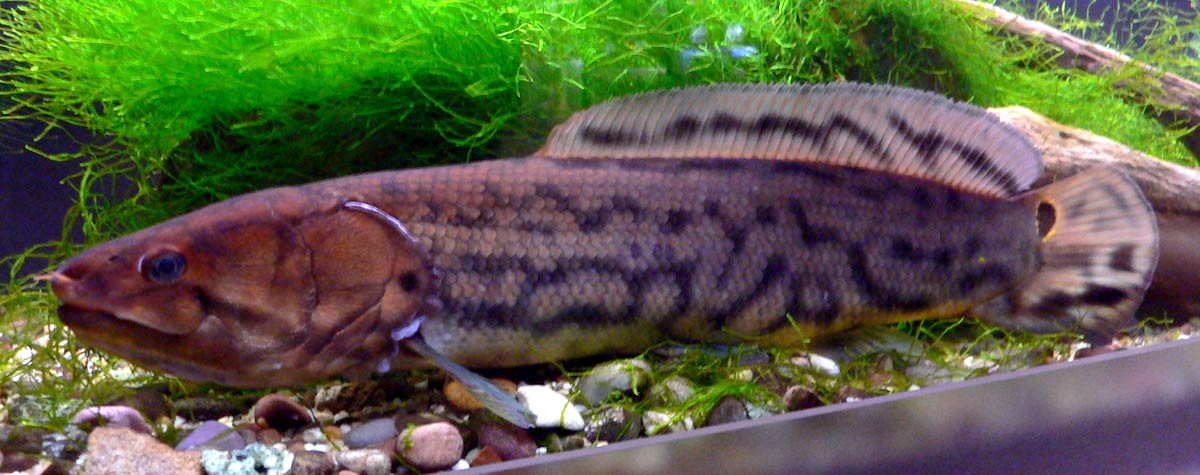
Bowfin

Family Amiidae (Bowfins)

- Bowfin (Amia calva)

== Order Hiodontiformes (Mooneyes) ==
Family Hiodontidae (Mooneyes)

- Mooneye (Hiodon tergisus)

== Order Anguilliformes (Eels) ==
Family Anguillidae (Freshwater eels)

- American eel (Anguilla rostrata)

== Order Clupeiformes (Herrings & relatives) ==
Family Alosidae (Shads & sardines)

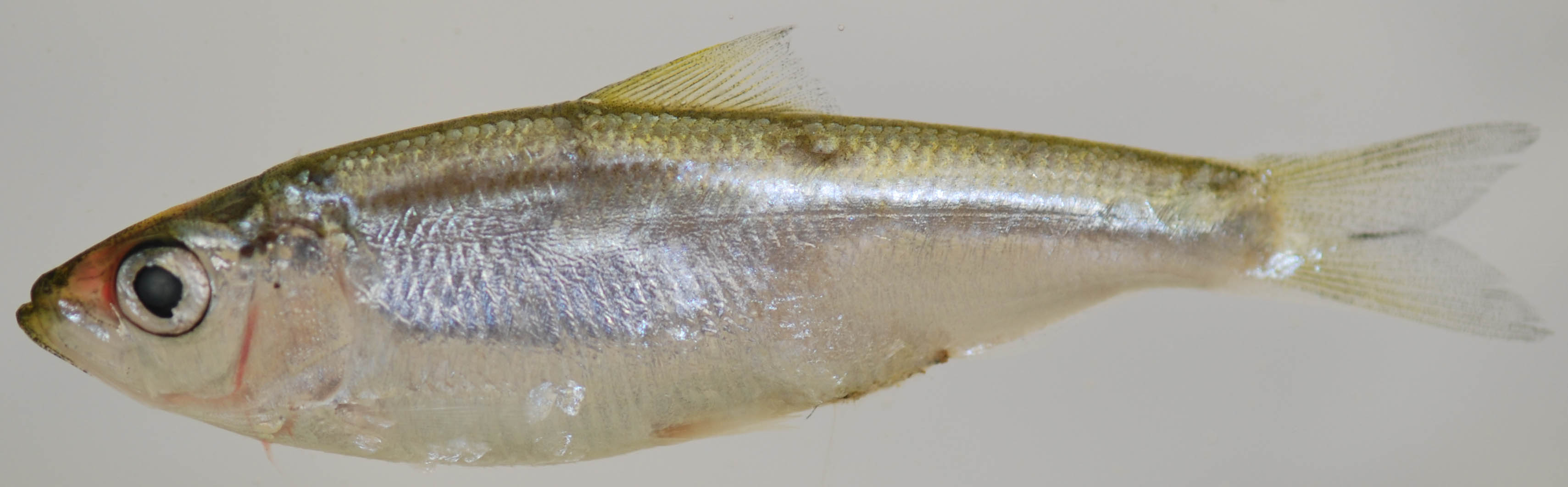
Blueback shad

- Blueback shad (Alosa aestivalis)
- Alewife (Alosa pseudoharengus) (I)
- American shad (Alosa sapidissima)
- American gizzard shad (Dorosoma cepedianum) (I)

== Order Cypriniformes (Carps, minnows, and relatives) ==
Family Cyprinidae (cyprinids)

- Goldfish (Carassius auratus) (I)
- European carp (Cyprinus carpio) (I)

Family Leuciscidae (True minnows)

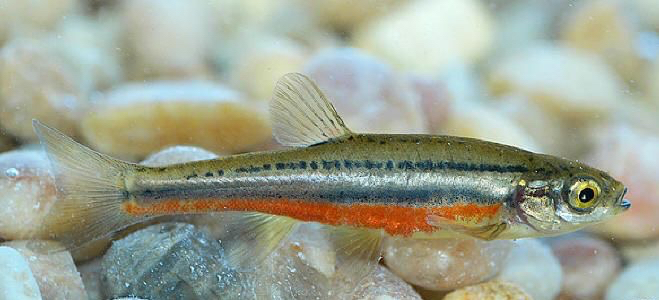
Northern redbelly dace

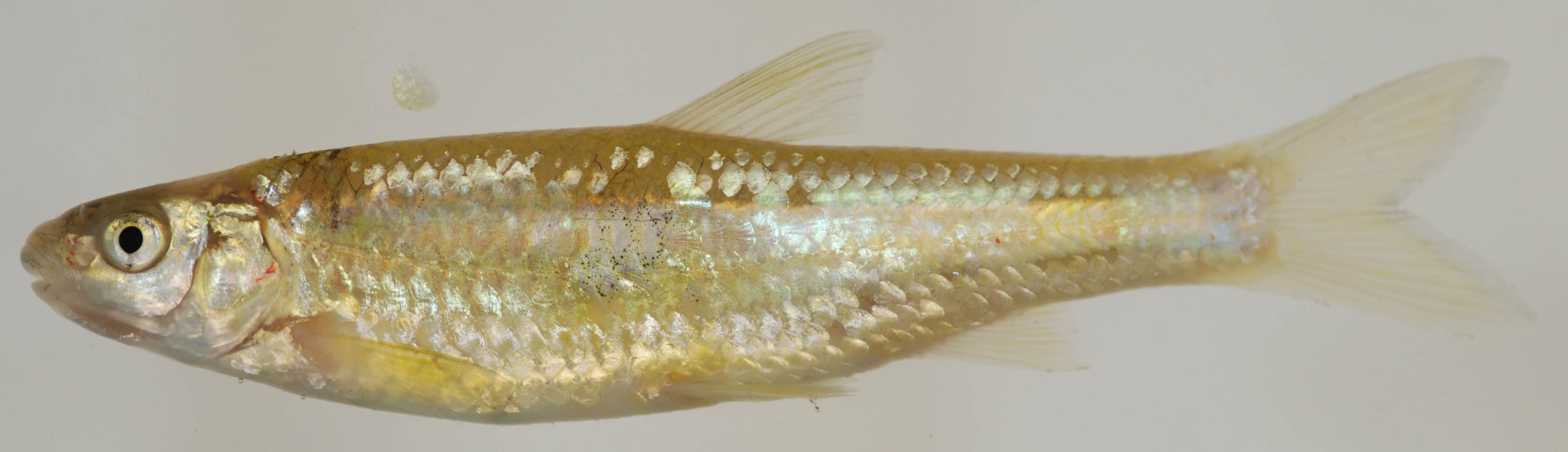
Eastern Silvery Minnow

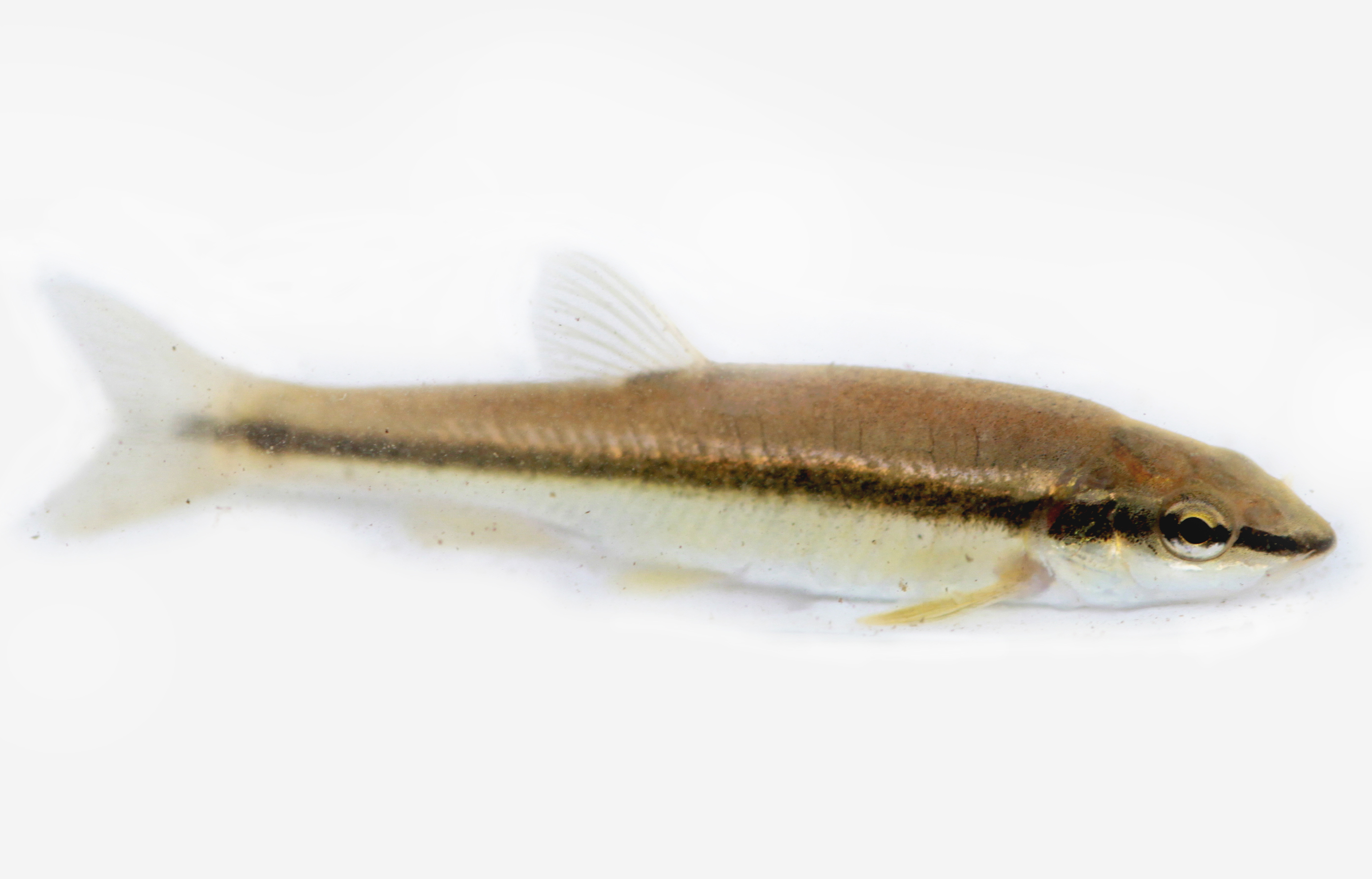
Eastern blacknose dace

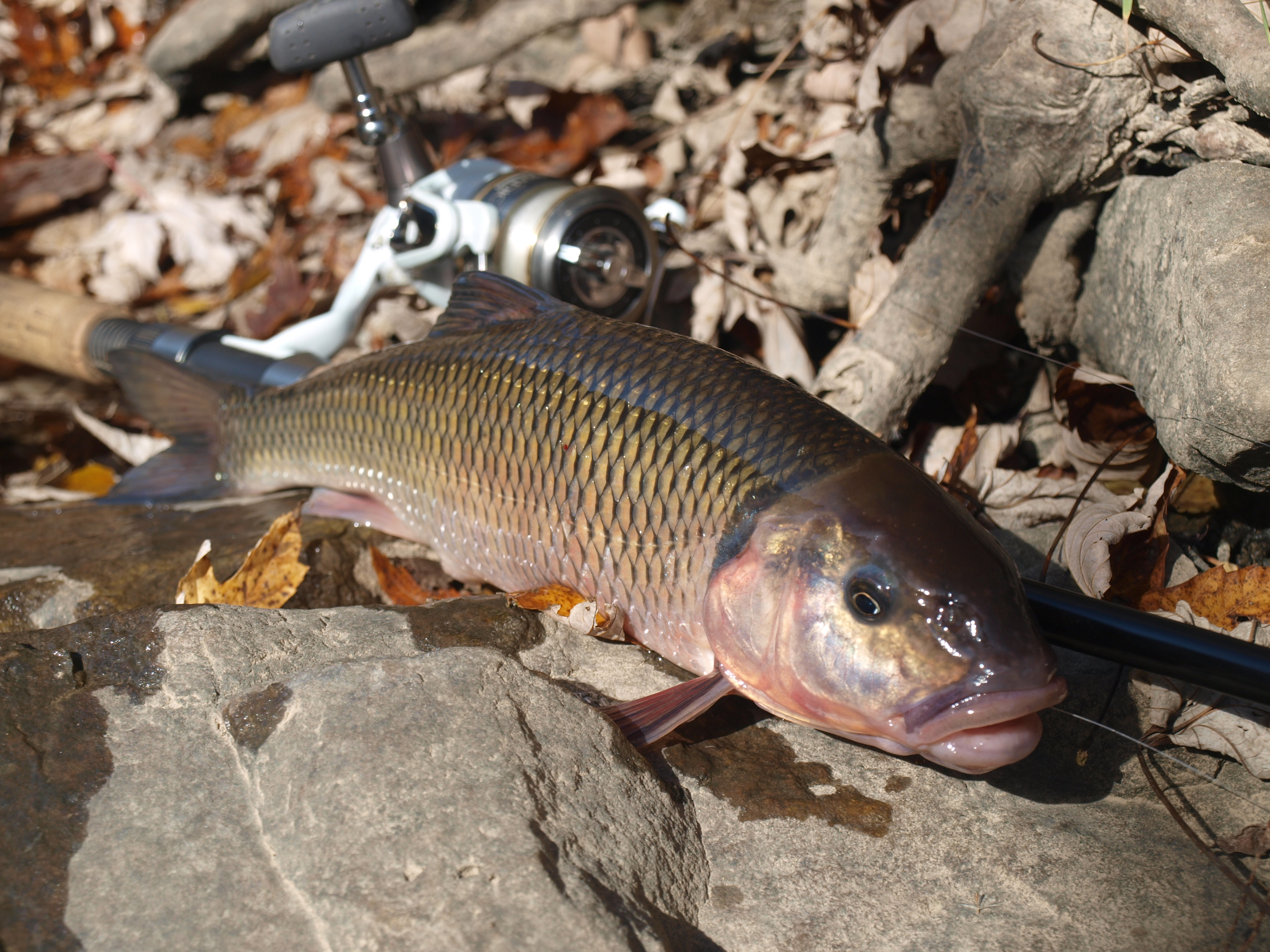
Fallfish

- Northern redbelly dace (Chrosomus eos)
- Finescale dace (Chrosomus neogaeus)
- Lake chub (Couesius plumbeus)
- Spotfin shiner (Cyprinella spiloptera)
- Cutlip minnow (Exoglossum maxillingua)
- Brassy minnow (Hybognathus hankinsoni)
- Eastern silvery minnow (Hybognathus regius)
- Common shiner (Luxilus cornutus)
- Allegheny pearl dace (Margariscus margarita)
- Northern pearl dace (Margariscus nachtriebi)
- Golden shiner (Notemigonus crysoleucas)
- Emerald shiner (Notropis atherinoides)
- Bridle shiner (Notropis bifrenatus)
- Blackchin shiner (Notropis heterodon)
- Blacknose shiner (Notropis heterolepis)
- Spottail shiner (Notropis hudsonius)
- Rosyface shiner (Notropis rubellus)
- Sand shiner (Notropis stramineus)
- Mimic shiner (Notropis volucellus)
- Bluntnose minnow (Pimephales notatus)
- Fathead minnow (Pimephales promelas)
- Eastern blacknose dace (Rhinichthys atratulus)
- Longnose dace (Rhinichthys cataractae)
- Rudd (Scardinius erythrophthalmus) (I)
- Creek chub (Semotilus atromaculatus)
- Fallfish (Semotilus corporalis)

Family Tincidae (Tenches)

- Tench (Tinca tinca) (I)

Family Catostomidae (Suckers)

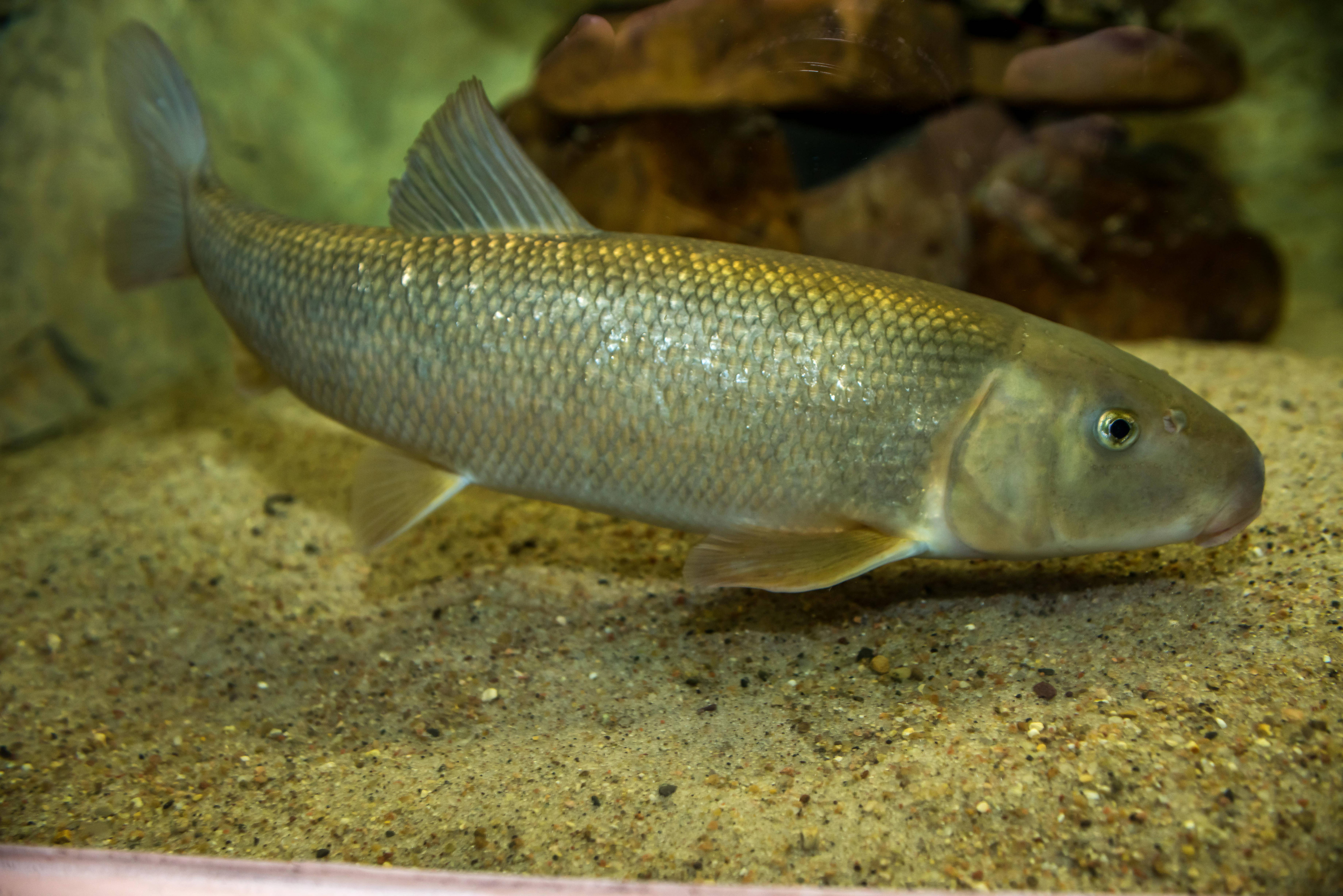
White sucker

- Quillback (Carpiodes cyprinus)
- Longnose sucker (Catostomus catostomus)
- White sucker (Catostomus commersonii)
- Silver redhorse (Moxostoma anisurum)
- Shorthead redhorse (Moxostoma macrolepidotum)
- Greater redhorse (Moxostoma valenciennesi)

== Order Siluriformes (Catfishes) ==
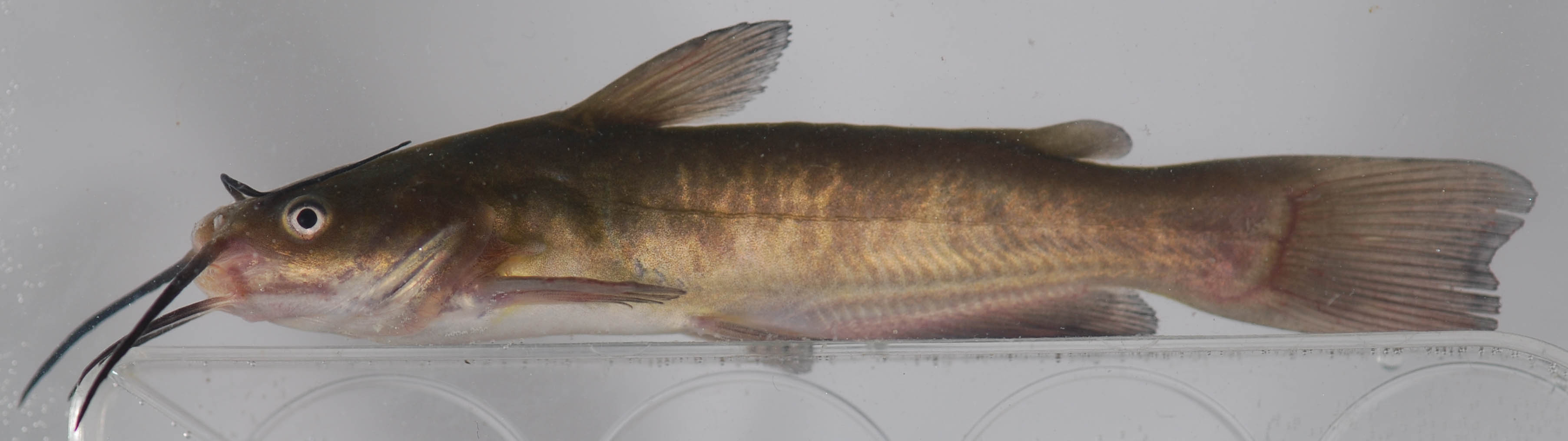
Brown bullhead

Family Ictaluridae (North American freshwater catfishes)

- Yellow bullhead (Ameiurus natalis)
- Brown bullhead (Ameiurus nebulosus)
- Channel catfish (Ictalurus punctatus)
- Stonecat (Noturus flavus)

== Order Osmeriformes (Smelts & allies) ==
Family Osmeridae (Smelts)

- Rainbow smelt (Osmerus mordax)

== Order Esociformes (Pikes & allies) ==
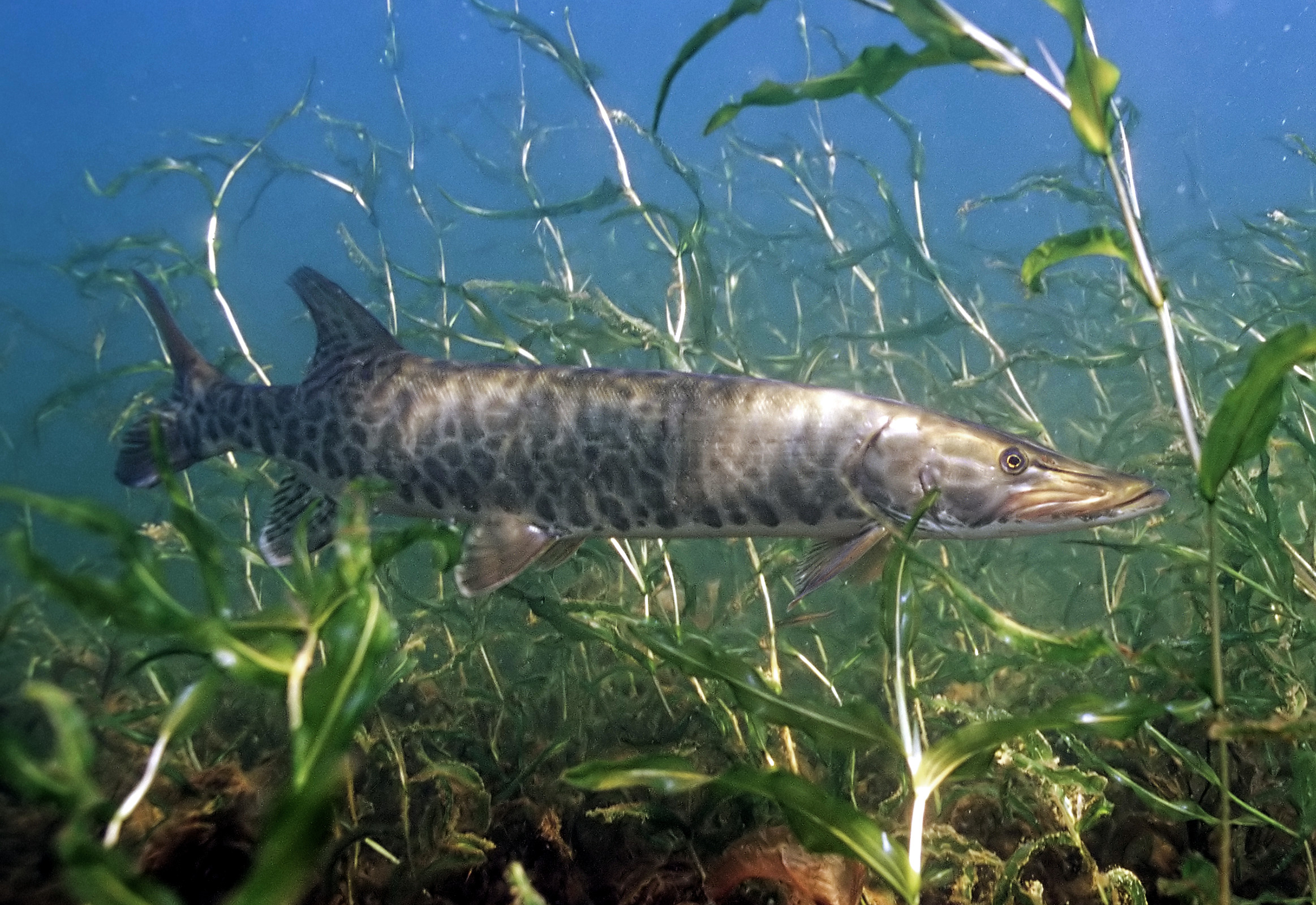
Muskellunge

Family Esocidae (Pikes)

- American pickerel (Esox americanus)
- Northern pike (Esox lucius)
- Muskellunge (Esox masquinongy)
- Chain pickerel (Esox niger)

Family Umbridae (Mudminnows)

- Central mudminnow (Umbra limi)

== Order Salmoniformes (Salmonids) ==
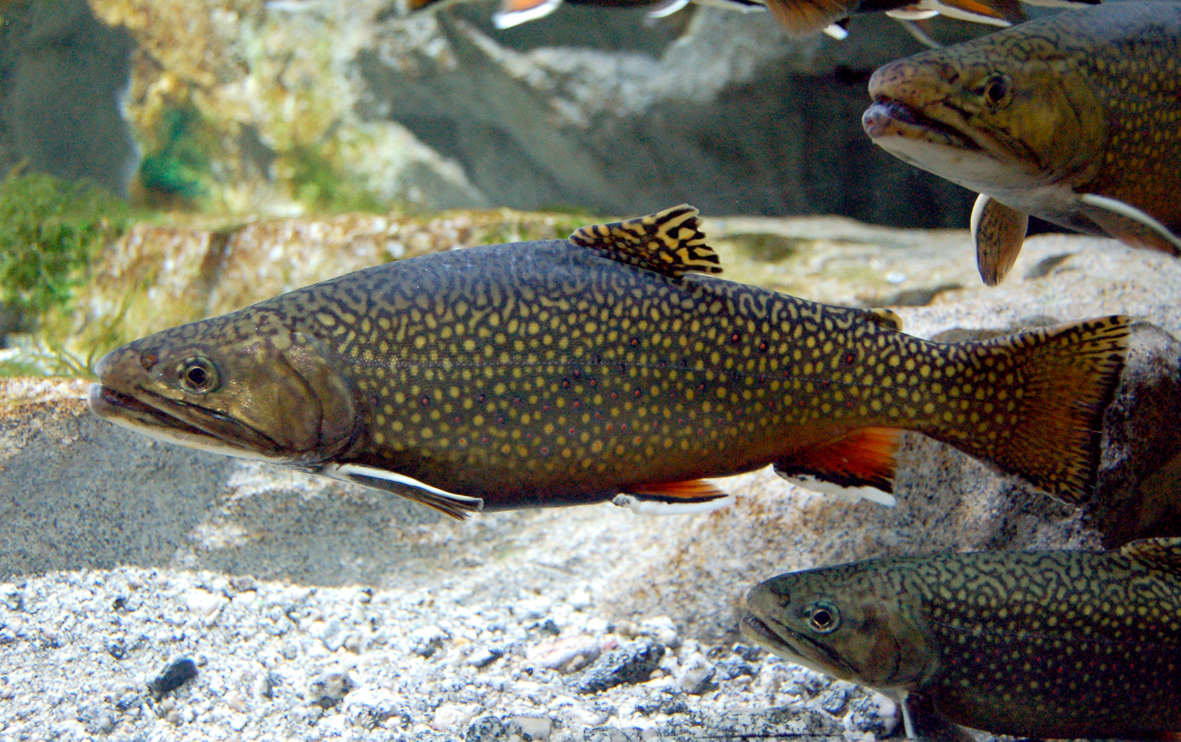
Brook trout

Family Salmonidae (Salmonids)

- Cisco (Coregonus artedi)
- Lake whitefish (Coregonus clupeaformis)
- Rainbow trout (Oncorhynchus mykiss) (I)
- Round whitefish (Prosopium cylindraceum)
- Atlantic salmon (Salmo salar)
- Brown trout (Salmo trutta) (I)
- Arctic char (Salvelinus alpinus) (Ex)
- Brook trout (Salvelinus fontinalis)
- Lake trout (Salvelinus namaycush)

== Order Percopsiformes (Trout-perch & allies) ==
Family Percopsidae (Trout-perch)

- Trout-perch (Percopsis omiscomaycus)

== Order Gadiformes (Cods) ==
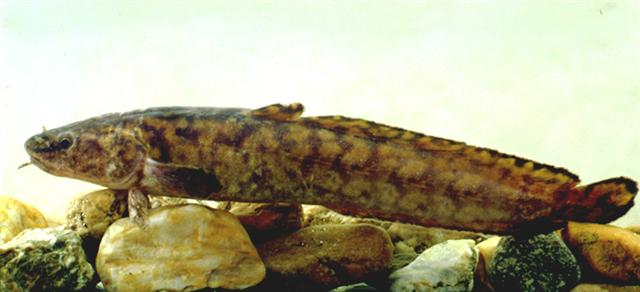
Burbot

Family Lotidae (Lingcods)

- Burbot (Lota lota)

== Order Cyprinodontiformes (Toothcarps) ==
Family Fundulidae (Topminnows & Killifish)

- Banded killifish (Fundulus diaphanus)

Family Atherinidae (Silversides)

- Brook silverside (Labidesthes sicculus)

== Order Scorpaeniformes (Sculpins & allies) ==
Family Gasterosteidae (Sticklebacks)

- Brook stickleback (Culaea inconstans)

Family Cottidae (Sculpins)

- Mottled sculpin (Cottus bairdii)
- Slimy sculpin (Cottus cognatus)

== Order Perciformes (Perch-liked fish) ==
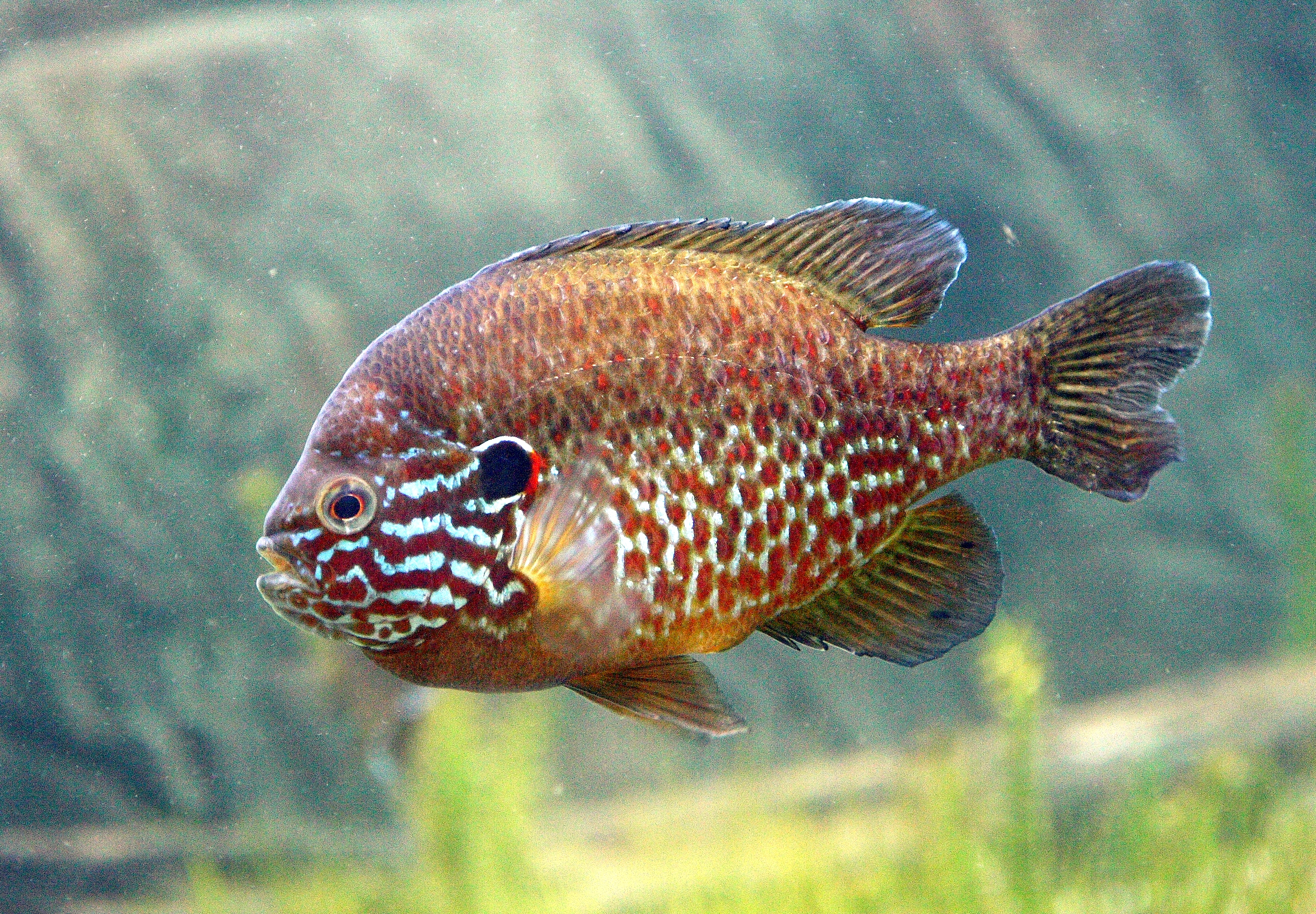
Pumpkinseed

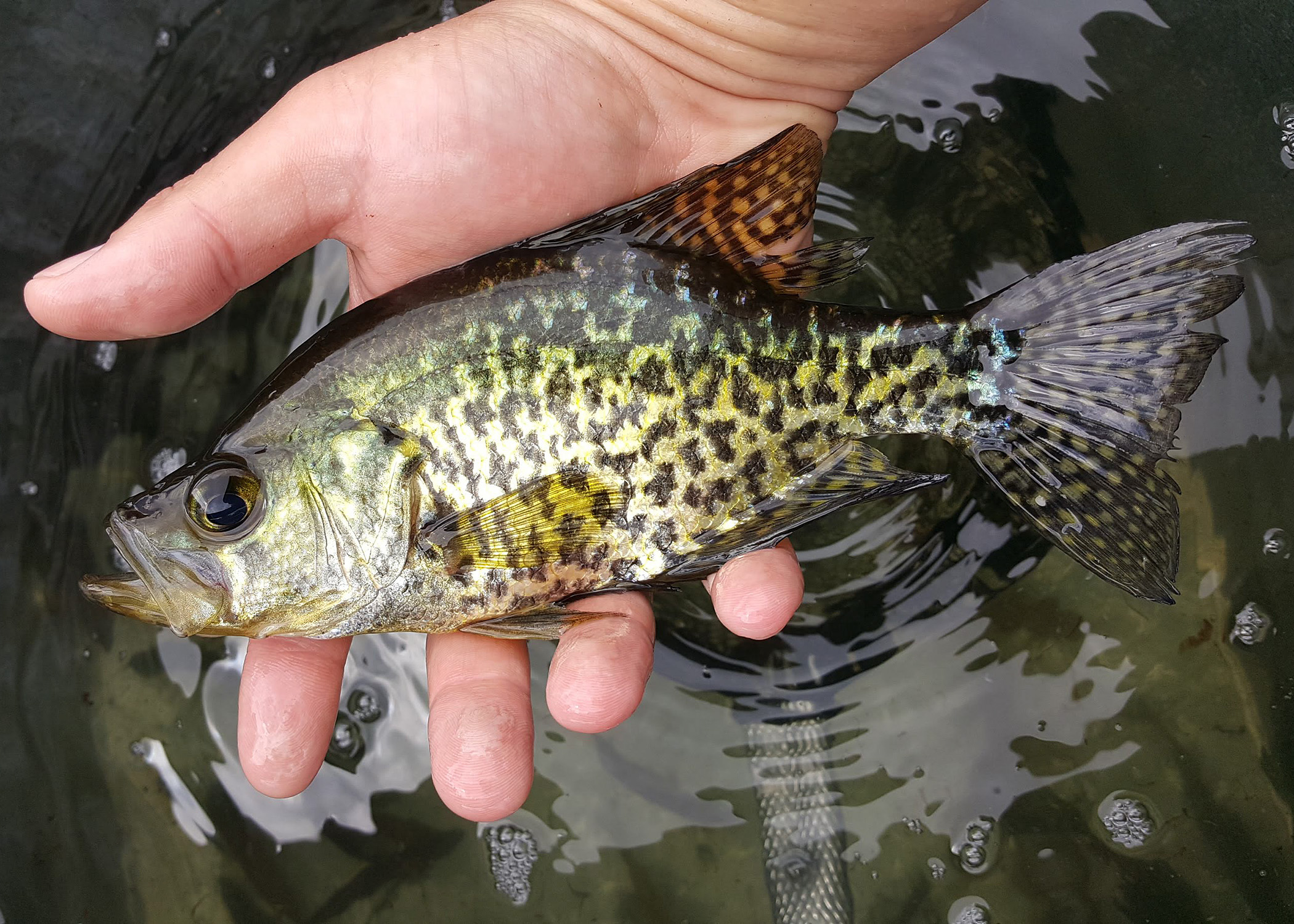
Black crappie

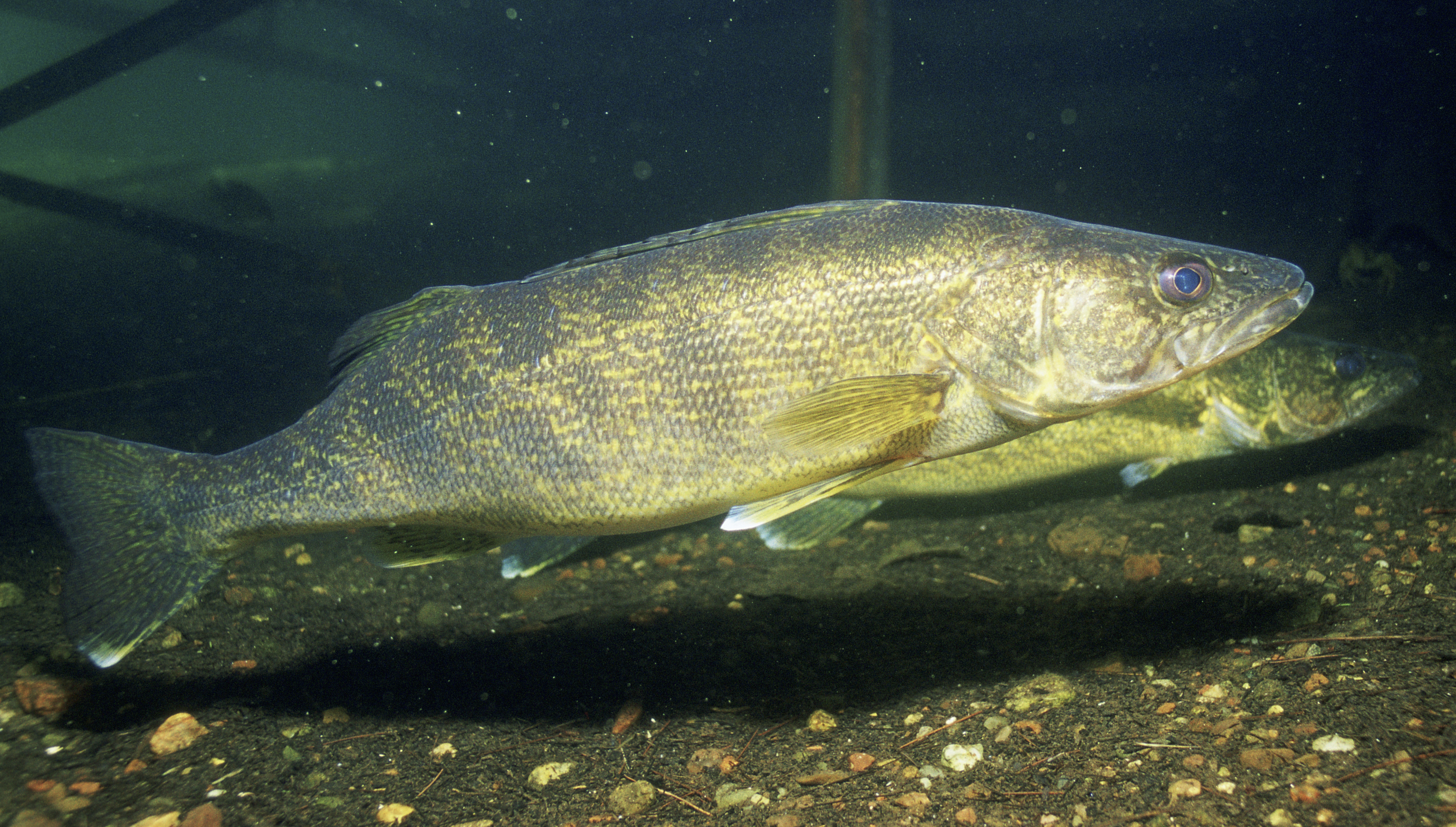
Walleye

Family Moronidae (Temperate basses)

- White perch (Morone americana) (I)

Family Centrarchidae (Sunfishes)

- Rock bass (Ambloplites rupestris)
- Redbreast sunfish (Lepomis auritus)
- Pumpkinseed (Lepomis gibbosus)
- Bluegill (Lepomis macrochirus)
- Redear sunfish (Lepomis microlophus) (I)
- Smallmouth bass (Micropterus dolomieu)
- Largemouth bass (Micropterus salmoides) (I)
- White crappie (Pomoxis annularis) (I)
- Black crappie (Pomoxis nigromaculatus)

Family Percidae (Perches)

- Eastern sand darter (Ammocrypta pellucida)
- Fantail darter (Etheostoma flabellare)
- Tessellated darter (Etheostoma olmstedi)
- Yellow perch (Perca flavescens)
- Common logperch (Percina caprodes)
- Channel darter (Percina copelandi)
- Sauger (Sander canadensis)
- Walleye (Sander vitreus)

Family Sciaenidae (Drums)

- Freshwater drum (Aplodinotus grunniens)
