= Tennessee dace =

Conservation status
- Vulnerable (IUCN 3.1)

- Vulnerable (NatureServe)

Scientific classification
- Kingdom: Animalia
- Phylum: Chordata
- Class: Actinopterygii
- Order: Cypriniformes
- Family: Leuciscidae
- Genus: Chrosomus
- Species: C. tennesseensis

Binomial name
- Chrosomus tennesseensis (W. C. Starnes & R. E. Jenkins, 1988)

Synonyms
- Phoxinus tennesseensis Starnes & Jenkins, 1988

Species of fish

The Tennessee dace (Chrosomus tennesseensis) is a species of freshwater ray-finned fish belonging to the family Leuciscidae, which includes the daces, chubs and related fishes. It is found only in the United States; particularly in northeast Tennessee and southwest Virginia, and parts of extreme northwest Georgia. Until recently, they were considered a subspecies of mountain redbelly dace. They are commonly found in East Tennessee in spring fed first-order streams, often in silt and fine gravel pools, or undercut banks. These streams usually do not exceed two meters in width.

Like all Tennessee species in the genus Chrosomus, Tennessee dace have tiny scales and scaled breasts. They usually have scarlet bellies, and are considered one of the most beautiful native fish in Tennessee.

Tennessee dace are considered nest associate spawners, using central stoneroller (Campostoma anomalum) and common creek chub (Semotilus atromaculatus) nests as spawning grounds. There is evidence to suggest that the Tennessee dace can interbreed with the common creek chub. Spawning for Tennessee dace starts in April and extends into July. Both males and females gain even more coloration during the breeding season.

Their diet is similar to that of other dace species, consisting mainly of attached algal growth. Historically, Tennessee dace have only been found in 62 locations. Due to limited distribution and other factors, they are considered "in need of management" in Tennessee. Future threats include human development and climate change.

== Systematics and etymology ==
Chrosomus tennesseensis is a member of the same monophyletic group that contains Chrosomus cumberlandensis (mountain blackside dace), Chrosomus oreas (mountain redbelly dace) and Chrosomus saylori (laurel dace). Until recently, the Tennessee dace was thought to be a variant of the mountain redbelly dace. However, morphological characteristics distinguish the two similar species. The Tennessee dace has a break in the dark lateral stripe that runs down the side of the body. Also, the Tennessee dace's eye pupil diameter is larger than the diameter of the dark spots above the lateral stripe, while the spots of oreas are larger than the pupil. The oreas is a more robust minnow with fewer scales in the lateral series. The species name "tennesseensis" means "of Tennessee," which is a reference to the Tennessee River drainage encompassing much of its native range.

== Description ==
The Tennessee dace has a complete lateral line. Their dorsal coloration ranges from nearly plain olivaceous to profusely speckled with black. Nuptial males have red lower sides and bellies, with red scattered around the operculum, in the preorbital area, and at the base of the dorsal fin. The pectoral, pelvic, and anal fins are yellow, while the breast and lower head are black. Bright silver areas occur at the anterior base of the dorsal, pectoral and pelvic fins. Tennessee dace exhibit sexual dimorphism. Males have more rounded pectoral fins while females have narrower and more pointed fins.

== Geographical distribution ==
The Tennessee dace has an extremely limited distribution, as it is only found in eastern Tennessee, extreme southwestern Virginia, and northwest Georgia. As of 2008, there are only 62 known populations. Specifically, it occurs sporadically in small tributaries in the ridge and valley margins of the Blue Ridge and Cumberland Plateau provinces of the upper Tennessee drainage from Virginia southwestward. Watersheds include the Emory and lower Clinch river systems, and south to the Hiwassee River system. They were likely extirpated from Whiteside, which is just west of Chattanooga.

== Ecology ==
The Tennessee dace inhabits spring-fed, first order streams that are usually less than two meters in width and shaded by woody vegetation. Woody vegetation often includes hemlock and rhododendron species. They prefer the ridge and valley limestone region. In stream habitat includes silt and fine gravel pools and undercut banks with woody debris and other material to serve as cover. Studies conducted found that root masses and other woody vegetation is critical for the survival of the Tennessee dace. Adults use root masses as cover, and young-of-the-year are often found inside of root masses. Debris that falls into streams provides additional cover.

Similar to other dace species, Tennessee dace feed on algal growth which is grazed from rocks and other debris on the stream bottom, and possibly beneath banks. While they are grazing algae, they coincidentally ingest tiny sand particles. These sand grains rupture diatoms and other algal cells during digestion. This is an important aid to digestion, as the cell walls of plants are difficult for the fish enzymes to break down. Additional nutrition may be obtained from both root hairs and bacteria associated with algal growth, and immature insects, which are consumed in the winter when algae supply is limited. Dipteran and caddis fly larvae make up most of their insect diet.

Little research has been done on the Tennessee dace's natural predators, but both mammals and birds have been known to feed on them in shallow pools.

== Behavior and life history ==
Tennessee dace spawn from April to July, and they have been found to spawn when water temperature is around 21 °C (70 °F). They have the ability to spawn twice during this time period, but most only spawn once in their lifetime. As with other Chrosomus species, spawning occurs in the afternoon on clear days. The Tennessee dace has a law fecundity rate compared to similar species. Ova produced by females ranges from 398 to 721. This is considerably less than mountain blackside dace, which can produce close to 3,000 ova.

Multiple male Tennessee dace have been observed following a single female through pool and run areas. In fact, as many as 20 have been observed following a single female. Males would form a straight line with the snout of one male just behind the caudal fin of the preceding male. They have also been observed leaping out of the water one hour before and after spawning.

Tennessee dace are nest associate spawners, meaning they use nests already made by other species to spawn. They have been found to use the nests of common creek chub and central stoneroller. If nests are not available, some Chrosomus species are thought to use shallow riffle areas in streams. Being a nest associate spawner has benefits, such as physical protection provided by the nest, and protection provided by the host of the nest. However, nest association may contribute to species rarity. Several minnow species that are nest associate spawners are protected on federal or state levels. Tennessee dace initiate spawning as soon as the nest is vacated by the host, allowing them to spawn. It has been hypothesized that a chemical cue from a nest building minnow may trigger Chrosomus species to spawn.

Natural hybridization is relatively common among North American cyprinids, and this is the case of the Tennessee dace and the common creek chub. This hybridization likely occurs due to their similar breeding behaviors, such as communal use of gravel nests. Degradation of streams is thought to increase the chance of hybridization, as this leaves a lack of clean gravel substrates needed for spawning.

== Conservation ==
The Tennessee dace is listed as G3 (globally vulnerable to extirpation) and S3 (state vulnerable to extirpation and extinction). It is listed as "in need of management" in Tennessee and "endangered" in Virginia.
