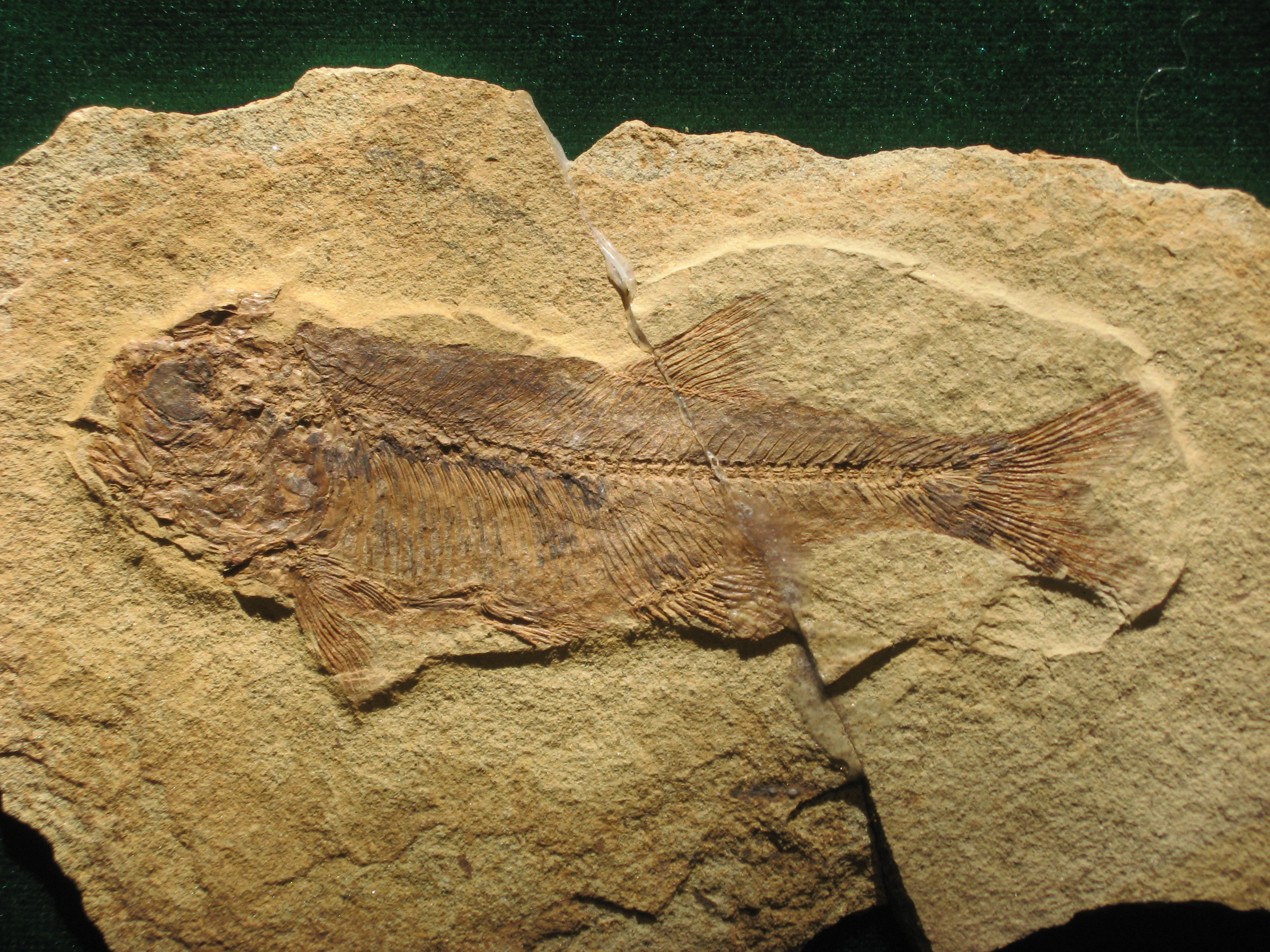
- Hiodon woodruffi fossil SRIC collection

Scientific classification
- Kingdom: Animalia
- Phylum: Chordata
- Class: Actinopterygii
- Order: Hiodontiformes
- Family: Hiodontidae
- Genus: Hiodon
- Species: †H. woodruffi

Binomial name
- †Hiodon woodruffi (Wilson, 1978)

Synonyms
- Eohiodon woodruffi Wilson, 1978

= Hiodon woodruffi =

Hiodon woodruffi Temporal range: 49.5–46.2 Ma Ypresian

Extinct species of fish

Hiodon woodruffi is an extinct species of bony fish in the mooneye family, Hiodontidae. The species is known from fossils found in the early Eocene deposits of northern Washington state in the United States and late Eocene deposits in northwestern Montana. The species was first described as Eohiodon woodruffi. H. woodruffi is one of two Eocene Okanagan Highlands mooneye species, and one of five fish identified in the Klondike Mountain Formation.

== Distribution and paleoenvironment ==
Hiodon woodruffi fossils have been recovered from two locations in the Okanagan highlands, the Horsefly shale near Horsefly, British Columbia and the several exposures of the Klondike Mountain Formation in northern Ferry County, Washington. Both sites represent upland lake systems that were surrounded by a warm temperate ecosystem with nearby volcanism. The highlands likely had a mesic upper microthermal to lower mesothermal climate, in which winter temperatures rarely dropped low enough for snow, and which were seasonably equitable.

The Okanagan highlands paleoforest surrounding the lakes have been described as precursors to the modern temperate broadleaf and mixed forests of Eastern North America and Eastern Asia. Based on the fossil biotas the lakes were higher and cooler then the coeval coastal forests preserved in the Puget Group and Chuckanut Formation of Western Washington, which are described as lowland tropical forest ecosystems. Estimates of the paleoelevation range between 0.7–1.2 km (0.43–0.75 mi) higher than the coastal forests. This is consistent with the paleoelevation estimates for the lake systems, which range between 1.1–2.9 km (1,100–2,900 m), which is similar to the modern elevation 0.8 km (0.50 mi), but higher.

Estimates of the mean annual temperature have been derived from climate leaf analysis multivariate program (CLAMP) analysis of the Republic paleoflora, and leaf margin analysis (LMA) of both the Horsefly and Republic paleofloras. The CLAMP results after multiple linear regressions for Republic gave a mean annual temperature of approximately 8.0 °C (46.4 °F), while the LMA gave 9.2 ± 2.0 °C (48.6 ± 3.6 °F). LMA of the Horsefly flora returned a mean annual temperature of 10.4 ± 2.2 °C (50.7 ± 4.0 °F). This is lower than the mean annual temperature estimates given for the coastal Puget Group, which is estimated to have been between 15–18.6 °C (59.0–65.5 °F). The bioclimatic analysis for Republic and Horsefly suggest mean annual precipitation amounts of 115 ± 39 cm (45 ± 15 in) and 105 ± 47 cm (41 ± 19 in) respectively.

== Age ==
When the first fossils were collected the Klondike Mountain formation was thought to be late Oligocene in age. Potassium-argon radiometric dating of samples taken near the Tom Thumb mine in 1966 resulted in a tentative 55 million years old age. Further refinement of sample dating has yielded an approximately Early Eocene, Ypresian age, being radiometrically dated as 49.4 million years old.

The Kishenehn Formation conservat lagerstätte in Northwestern Montana has been dated to approximately 46.02 million years old based on potassium-argon of the Coal Creek member.

== History and classification ==
The earliest find, which were later identified as H. woodruffi, were specimens collected by Canada's first vertebrate paleontologist Lawrence Lambe in 1906 from Horsefly.

Fossils of Hiodon woodruffi were first collected in the Klondike Mountain Formation of Washington in the 1960s. One set of fish was collected from the Toroda Creek Graben northwest of Republic by R. C. Pearson, and tentatively identified by paleoichthyologist David Dunkle as members of several genera including the Aphredoderid Tricophanes. Pearson sent almost all of the specimens collected to the Smithsonian, but the fossils were never accessioned into the collections and are now considered lost. Pearson did retain one "Tricophanes" fossil from the initial collection which was later donated to the USGS collections. During the same decade, a collection of fish from near the Tom Thumb Mine in Republic was compiled by the young resident R. Woodward. This collection was subsequently donated to the University of Alberta paleontology department by Woodward's family in 1977. During the summers of 1976 and 1977 the University of Alberta also conducted field collecting in both the Toroda Creek and Republic areas, yielding a number of fossil fish material, including a single hiodontid.

The Okanagan highland hiodontid fossils were studied in detail by paleoichthyologist Mark Wilson, of the University of Alberta, with a monograph overview of the British Columbian Eocene fish fauna and redescription of H. rosei being published in 1977, followed by a smaller paper in 1978 containing the H. woodruffi description. The type description of H.woodruffi was published in the May 1978 issue of the Canadian Journal of Earth Sciences. The etymology of the species name woodruffi was chosen in recognition of the Woodruff family for the collection and donation of the specimens studied. Wilson designated University of Alberta specimen UA 13227A & 13227B, collected during the 1976 field work at the Tom Thumb mine as the holotype and also designated a series of topotype specimens in the type series. Specimens UA 13241, 13244, 13250, 13262 and 1326 were all collected by R. Woodruff, while specimen UA 13225 was collected during the 1976 field season. Additionally Wilson referred a group of other specimens to the species which were not included in the type series including four specimens from Horsefly and USGS El-2185, the Tricophanes fossil collected by Pearson in the 1960s. H. woodruffi coexisted with four other fish species in the Klondike Mountain Formation lake system.

A reassessment and redescription of Hiodontidae was completed by Hilton and Grande in 2008. They noted that the known osteological morphology range of the species assigned to Eohiodon were within the osteology spectrum seen in modern Hiodon individuals. This merging of Eohiodon into Hiodon resulted in the species being moved to Hiodon woodruffi as the accepted binomial. Hilton and Grande examined specimens from the Okanagan Highlands as well as specimens referred to the species which had been found in the Kishenehn Formation, and noted that the proposed merging of Hiodon falcatus from the Green River Formation was not accepted, based on differences in osteology.

== Description ==
Based on the consistent preservation of specimens in lateral views, Wilson determined that both young and adult H. woodruffi specimens had laterally compressed bodies. At the time of description the one complete adult male had a body length of 108 mm (4.3 in), with the species having a hypothetical upper length of 110 mm (4.3 in). The holotype fish was suggested to be either an adult female or immature large male, based on the lack of expanded anal rays. There are between 47 and 49 total vertebrae, of which 24 to 25 are caudal and 22 to 24 are precaudal vertebrae. Scales are sparse, with a rounded outline and have parallel furrows along the front edges.

Adults of Hiodon woodruffi have between 12 and 13 rays in the pectoral fins, based on the six observed specimens. The pelvic fins have about 7 total rays, and extend to down the body 2/3 of the way to the anus, starting just to the front of where the anal fin starts, and extending towards the tail ending above the rear third of the anal fin. With a triangular outline, the dorsal fin is composed of 13 to 15 branching rays each attached to a vertebra, and the rear most ray is double branched. The anal fin has 17-18 branched rays, one unbranched ray, and several rudimentary rays giving a slightly concave outline on the holotype, but on mature males, thickening of the frontal 10 rays gives a rounded fin outline. The caudal fin has eight branching rays above the fishes midline, and another eight rays below. The fin is emarginate, with the upper and lower rays extending outwards and dipping back in to meet closer to the body in the central section of fin. The fin tips and center fork are all gently rounded.

Hiodon woodruffi are noted to be larger at maturity then the coeval H. rosei, with more anal rays, and a longer length at maturity. Mature male H. rosei specimens average 50 mm (2.0 in), H. woodruffi males are am average of 108 mm (4.3 in), while the living Hiodon alosoides and Hiodon tergisus males average 250 mm (9.8 in).
