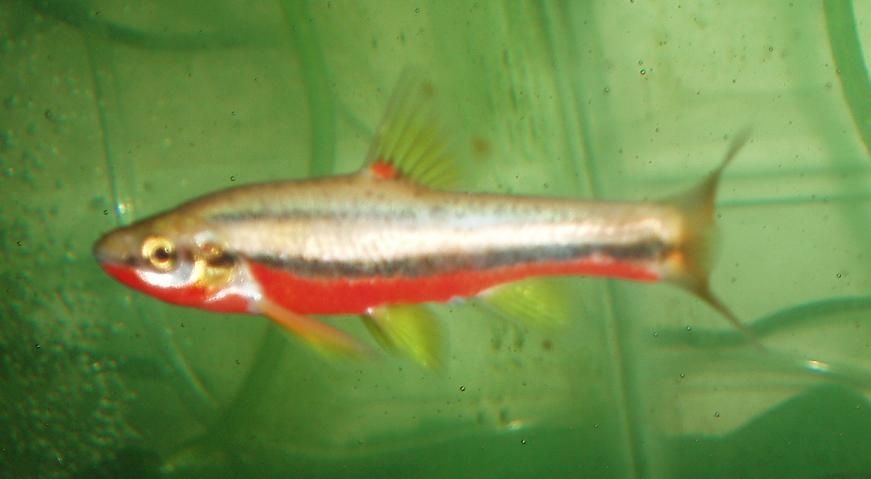
- Adult breeding coloration
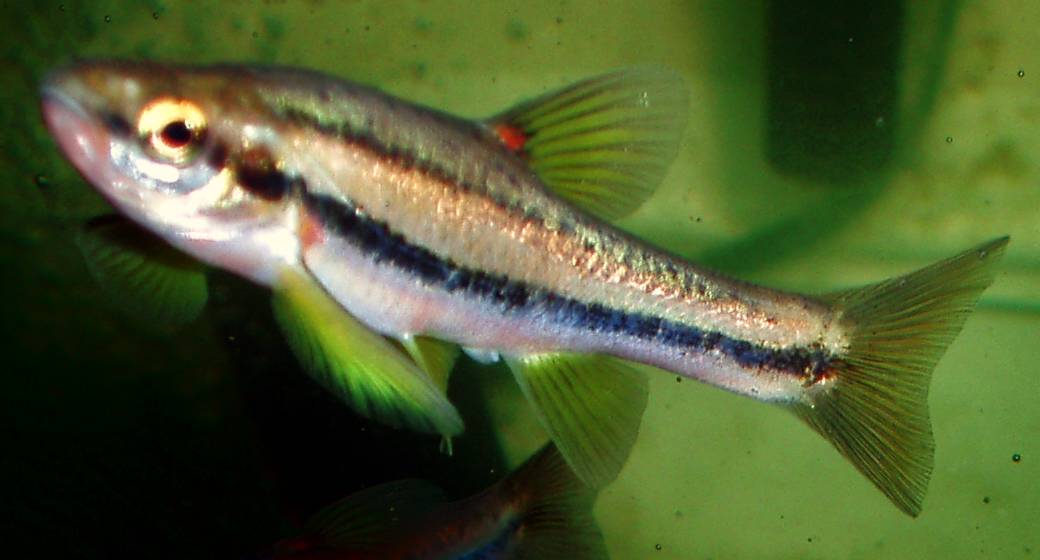
- Adult non-breeding coloration

Conservation status
- Least Concern (IUCN 3.1)

- Secure (NatureServe)

Scientific classification
- Kingdom: Animalia
- Phylum: Chordata
- Class: Actinopterygii
- Order: Cypriniformes
- Family: Leuciscidae
- Genus: Chrosomus
- Species: C. erythrogaster

Binomial name
- Chrosomus erythrogaster Rafinesque, 1820

Synonyms
- Luxilus erythrogaster Rafinesque, 1820; Phoxinus erythrogaster (Rafinesque, 1820); Semotilus diplemia Rafinesque, 1820; Chrosomus pyrrhogaster Jordan, 1876

= Southern redbelly dace =

Species of fish

The southern redbelly dace (Chrosomus erythrogaster) is a species of freshwater ray-finned fish belonging to the family Leuciscidae, which includes the daces, chubs and related fishes. The natural geographic range extends from Western New York to Minnesota, and south to Oklahoma, Arkansas, and Alabama. This fish prefers flowing pools of creeks and streams.

The extremely similar northern redbelly dace can be distinguished by a rounder, blunter head and a more upturned mouth, as well as by differences in spawning behavior. Also, male southern redbelly dace show a characteristic red belly in spring while their northern counterparts keep a white belly.

== Description ==
Maximum length is reported as 9.1 cm TL, but average length is typically 5.8 cm TL. The fish live a few years, the maximum reported at 3. These dace have horizontal black stripes and a silvery area above the black stripe. Males have red or yellow stripes below the main black stripe that are especially evident during breeding season. The southern redbelly dace has two sets of paired fins located distal to the operculum, the pectoral and ventral fins. These are followed distally by the anal fin and caudal fin. All fins are yellow, with the dorsal and caudal fins having a red base at their proximal connection. The caudal fin has a notched shape with two points. The rays in the fins are soft and are called "soft rays." Their fusiform body shape is efficient for swimming through moving waters.

== Distribution and habitat ==
The southern redbelly dace can be found as far west as Colorado and as far east as Pennsylvania.There are populations throughout the midwest from southern Minnesota to Alabama and Mississippi. However, the southern redbelly dace is most populous around the Ohio, Mississippi, and Missouri River drainages. It is found in temperate waters from 44°N - 34°N. The southern redbelly dace lives in clear, flowing bodies of water, typically streams and rivers.

== Feeding ==
Southern redbelly daces have a varied diet, including algae, diatoms, and invertebrates. They feed on almost any type of particle in the water for nutrition. More generally, their diet is described as one of "vegetation and invertebrates."

== Conservation status ==
This organism is found in healthy numbers throughout the US, however, isolated populations in Colorado, New Mexico, South Dakota, Michigan, and Pennsylvania have become critically imperiled due to isolation.

== Environmental significance ==
The southern redbelly dace is an important environmental indicator of river and stream health. This is because the minnow prefers clear unpolluted waters. They use their vision to find food, so a habitat of clear water is necessary.
