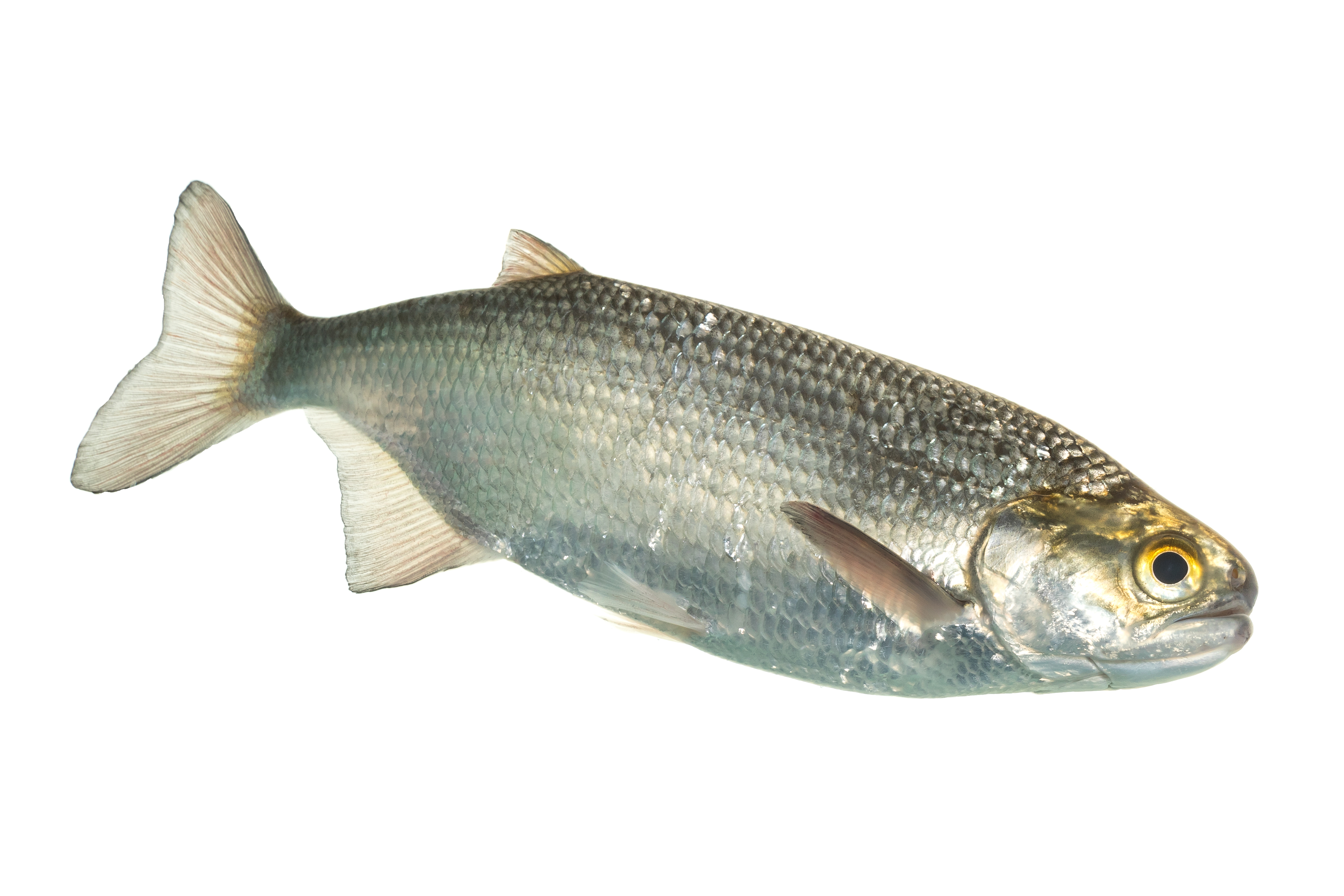

Conservation status
- Least Concern (IUCN 3.1)

Scientific classification
- Kingdom: Animalia
- Phylum: Chordata
- Class: Actinopterygii
- Division: Teleostei
- Order: Hiodontiformes
- Family: Hiodontidae
- Genus: Hiodon
- Species: H. alosoides

Binomial name
- Hiodon alosoides (Rafinesque, 1819) Nash 1908

Synonyms
- List: ?Amphiodon alveoides Rafinesque 1819; Clupea alosoides Rafinesque 1819; Amphiodon alosoides (Rafinesque 1819) Hubbs 1926; Hyodon alosoides Jordan and Gilbert 1883; Hiodon clodalis Lesueur 1818; Clodalus clodalus (Lesueur 1818); Hiodon chrysopsis Richardson 1836; Hyodon chrysopsis (Richardson 1836) Jordan and Evermann 1896–1900; Elattonistius chrysopsis (Richardson 1836) Jordan and Thomson 1910; Hiodon amphiodon Rafinesque 1820

= Goldeye =

Species of fish

The goldeye (Hiodon alosoides) is a freshwater fish found in Canada and the Upland South plus central United States. It is one of only two extant species in the family Hiodontidae, the other species being Hiodon tergisus. The species name alosoides means shad-like. It is also called Winnipeg goldeye, western goldeye, yellow herring, toothed herring, shad mooneye, la Queche, weepicheesis, or laquaiche aux yeux d'or in French.

== Morphology ==
Goldeyes are recognizable by their silver compressed body form and their large gold-coloured eyes. Their body appears to be a blue-green silver from above and a more white silver from below. They have two abdominal and pelvic fins as well as a dorsal on their back and an anal fin on their underside. The dorsal fin is positioned opposite or behind the origin of the anal fin. Goldeyes also have a fleshy keel that extends from the pectoral fins to the base of the anal fin. Their mouth is large and in the terminal position with a blunt round snout. There are teeth present on the tongue, the roof of the mouth on the parasphenoid bone and the palatopterygoid arch and along the jaws. The goldeye fish has cycloid scales that lack spines. They also have a sensory system known as the lateral line system. Adults are usually about 15–17 inches (380–430 mm) but can reach 20 inches (510 mm). Goldeyes typically weigh only 1–2 pounds (0.45–0.91 kg).

== Reproduction ==
The age of first reproduction for goldeyes is 7–10 years for females and 6–9 years for males. They spawn in late May or early June. The eggs that they lay are about 4 millimetres (0.16 in) in size and they are semi-buoyant. This is a rare trait in fresh water fish, but is more common in marine fish. The eggs are suspended in the water and they drift downstream or to quiet waters. The majority of growth that occurs between June and September.

== Range ==
Goldeyes occur from as far down the Mackenzie River as Aklavik in the north to Mississippi in the south, and from Alberta in the west to Ohio south of the Great Lakes, with an isolated population south of James Bay. It prefers turbid slower-moving waters of lakes and rivers.

== Diet ==
Goldeyes feed on insects, crustaceans, fish and frogs. The fish averages less than 1 lb (450 g) or 12 in (30 cm) in length, but can be found up to 2 lb (910 g) or 16 in (41 cm) in some lakes. It has been reported up to 52 cm (20 in) in length.

== Fishing ==
The goldeye is considered a good fly-fishing fish, but not popular with most anglers because of its small size. It is one of 122 new species of animals, birds, and fish documented by the Lewis & Clark Corps of Discovery. Commercial fishing of this species was reported as early as 1876. Its fresh flesh is considered soft and unappealing, so it was only taken randomly in gillnets and (in the past) sold for dogfood. They are now consumed as a smoked fish commonly smoked in oak or apple wood and marinated in a brine of salt, sugar, and spices.

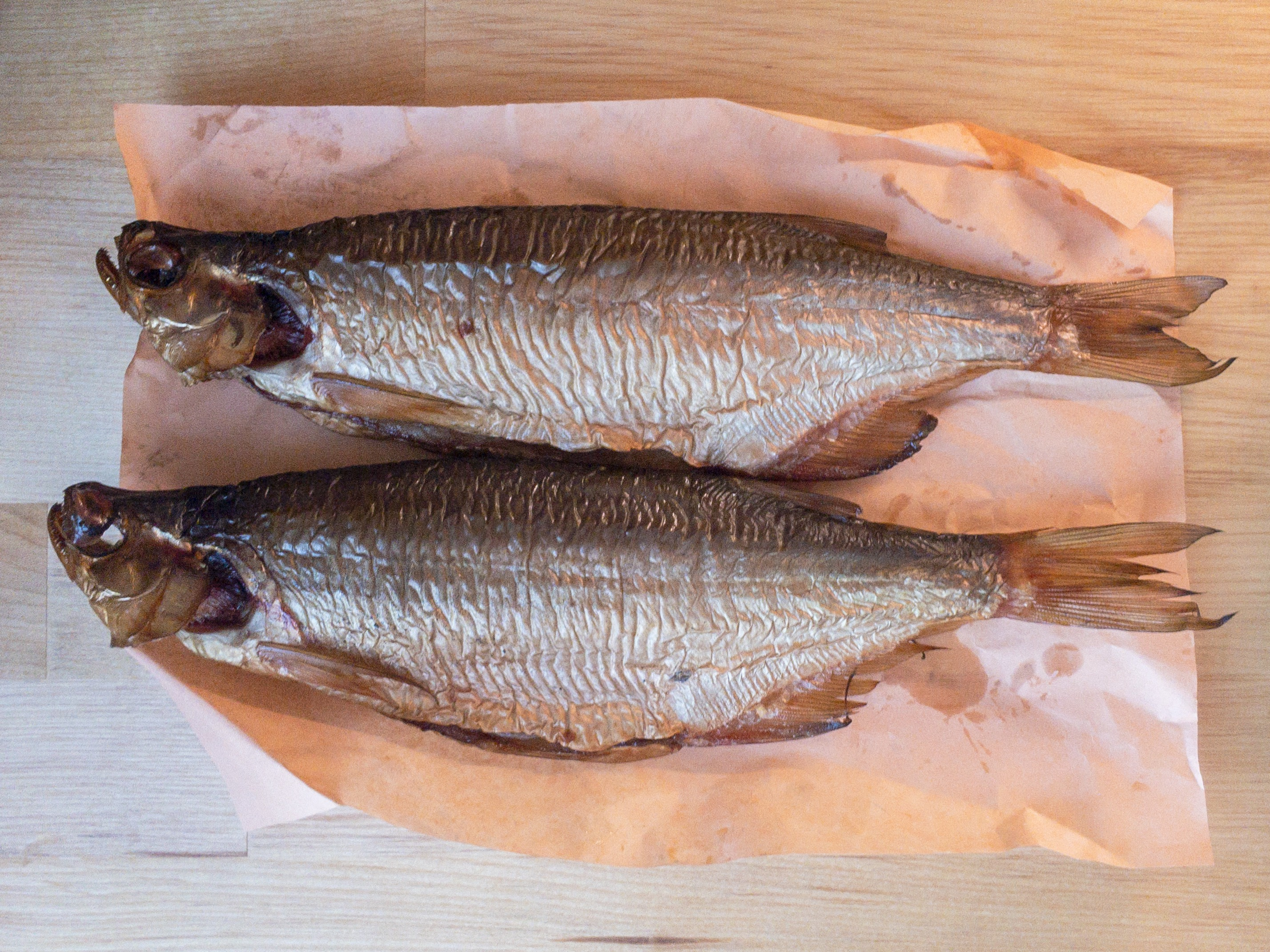
Two smoked Lake Winnipeg goldeyes purchased from a fisherman-owned business near Winnipeg Beach, Manitoba.

Its commercial viability was realized by Robert Firth, who immigrated to Winnipeg, Manitoba from Hull, England in 1886. Firth was carrying on a mediocre trade in cold-smoked goldeye, when he miscalculated the heat of his smoker and accidentally developed the now-standard method of hot-smoking it whole. The bright red or orange colour of the smoked fish resulted from using only willow smoke, but today is achieved through aniline dye. It became a fashionable gourmet dish after 1911, with Woodrow Wilson and the Prince of Wales counted amongst its fans. In 1926–29 the annual catch exceeded a million pounds, but stocks declined from 1931 and little was fished from Lake Winnipeg after 1938. A small amount of the commercial harvest is shipped to the United States, but most is consumed in Canada. Although Lake Winnipeg was once the main commercial source, it now comes from elsewhere, especially in Saskatchewan and Alberta, and the culinary name Winnipeg goldeye has come to be associated with the city where it is processed.

The fish is the namesake of Winnipeg's minor league baseball team, the Winnipeg Goldeyes.

== See also ==
- List of smoked foods
