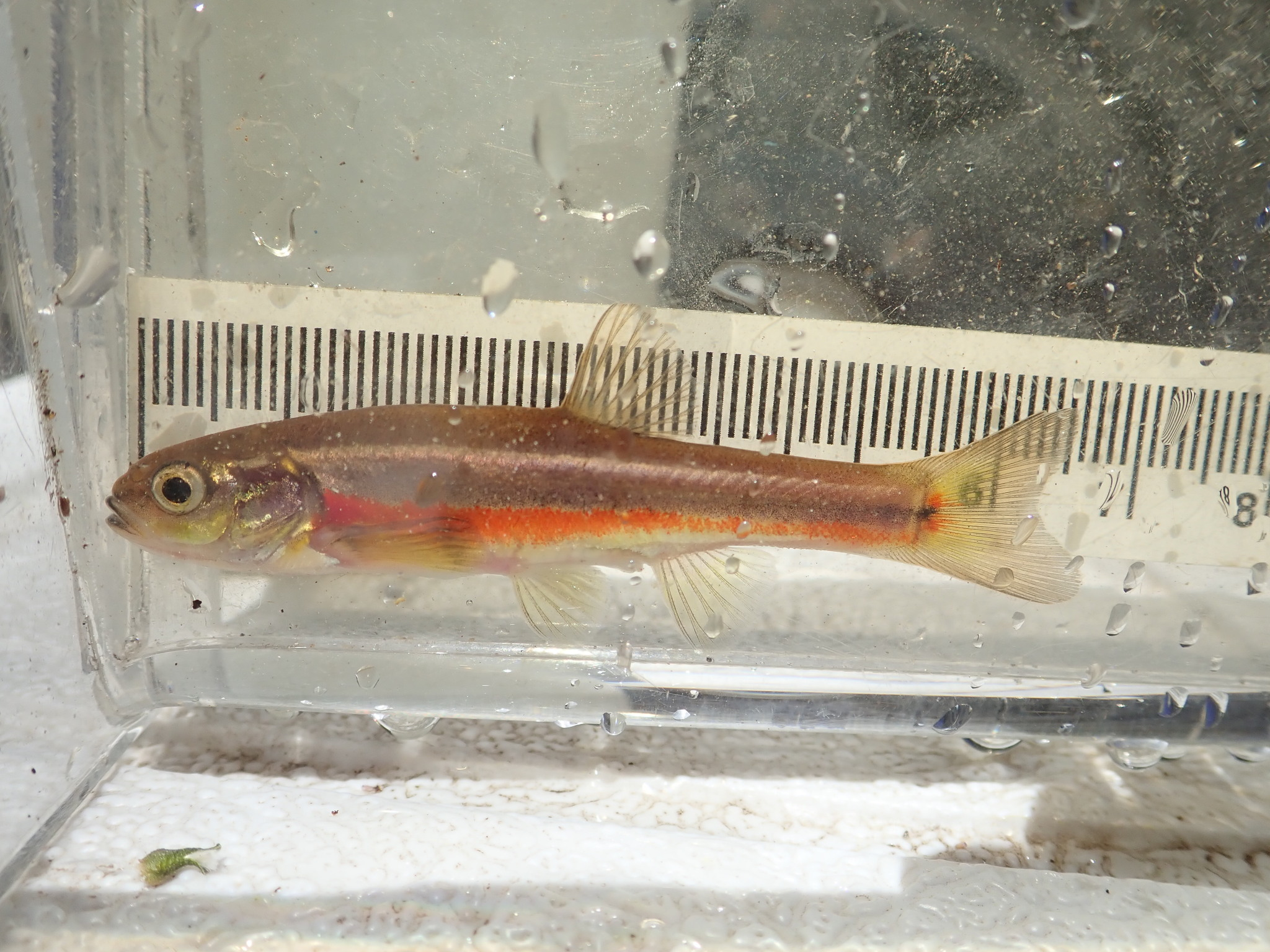
- In Ontario, Canada.
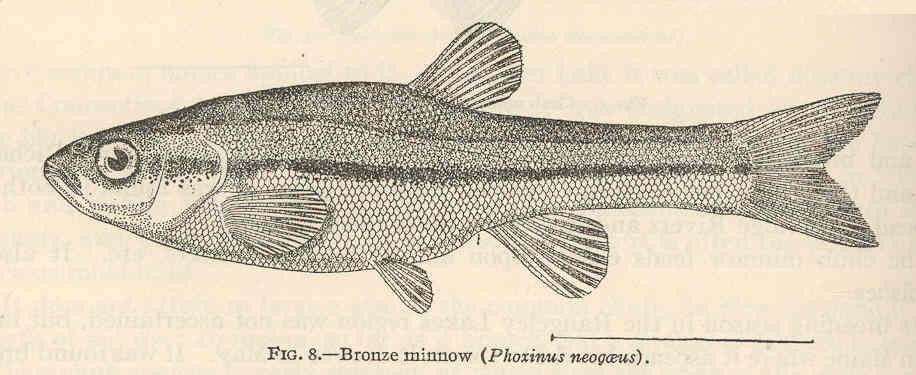
- 1918 illustration

Conservation status
- Least Concern (IUCN 3.1)

- Secure (NatureServe)

Scientific classification
- Kingdom: Animalia
- Phylum: Chordata
- Class: Actinopterygii
- Order: Cypriniformes
- Family: Leuciscidae
- Genus: Chrosomus
- Species: C. neogaeus

Binomial name
- Chrosomus neogaeus (Cope, 1867)

Synonyms
- Phoxinus neogaeus Cope, 1867

= Finescale dace =

Species of fish

The finescale dace (Chrosomus neogaeus), or bronze minnow, is a species of freshwater ray-finned fish belonging to the family Leuciscidae, which includes the daces, chubs and related fishes. It is native to the northern portions of Minnesota, with relatively smaller populations in northern New York, Vermont, New Hampshire (where C. neogaeus is found in only Connecticut and Androscoggin River drainages north of the White Mountains), and Maine.

== Distribution ==
The finescale dace occupies the regions ranging across the southern and northwest parts of Canada to areas of Minnesota, and more southward to the areas that lie near the Great Lakes Basin. The populations have been shown to inhabit areas in Minnesota including Brule Lake, as well as those bodies of water occupying the Lake Superior drainage areas of St. Louis and Cook counties. This species has also been found to live in the Great Lakes drainage stream regions of Wisconsin, although it is rarely seen in southern parts of Wisconsin. Despite the more northerly distribution, they have been seen to exist as Glacial relict populations in the Sand Hills of Nebraska, the Black Hills of South Dakota, Colorado, and parts of Wyoming.

== Description ==
The finescale dace gets its name from the fine scales running along its body. The species is characterized by its large, blunt head, and dark lateral bands running parallel to the length of its bronze and black body. On each lateral line there may be more than 80 scales. These scales are classified as leptoid scales. The leptoid scales are thin and flexible and cover the extent of the body. Leptoid scales are divided in two groups of specificity. The finescale dace has what are called ctenoid scales, called this because of the ctenii that run along the posterior area of the fish. A lateral line system exists on the fish and allows it to orient itself in moving water. Main row teeth are distributed 5–4 usually, but have been seen as 4–4, 4–5, and 5–5 as well. The fish has paired fins lying on the pectoral and pelvic fins. The pectoral fins lie on the sides of the body. The pelvic fins are placed in the thoracic position. They range in size from 60 to 70 millimeters (2.4 to 2.8 in) long, about the length of an average person's thumb.

== Ecology ==
This fish is most often found in the cool, acidic waters of the north. More specifically, they are found in the calm waters of slow-moving creeks and in cool, boggy ponds. Beaver ponds provide an excellent habitat, as they are found hidden in the safety among sunken logs and downed brush. They prey on tiny invertebrates including small insects such water beetles. Their diet also includes a variety of crustaceans, plankton, algae, and in the Northern parts of Minnesota, fingernail clams.

== Importance to humans ==
Finescale daces are predated on by a multitude of species, including diving beetles, mink, brook trout, and kingfishers. They are, however, not consumed by humans but are sold as bait in many parts of Minnesota and Canada.

== Conservation status ==
No concern is taken for the populations of finescale dace. Their resiliency and sturdiness make them a great species for the bait industry in Wisconsin, Minnesota, and Canada, as well as pets in home aquariums.

== Life cycle ==
Breeding begins in April and ends in June, when the internal temperature of the streams heat to at least 15 °C (59 °F). The yellow and red colors exhibited in the pigments on the underside of a male's body during breeding season alerts the female of sexual readiness. They attract the more muted colored females to large indentations in the sandy bottom of the stream, underneath waterlogged timber and brush. The pair will shoot into the indentation together and the female will proceed to lay her eggs while the male begins to fertilize them with his sperm. The eggs settle on the bottom of the floor and are left unattended by both parents. This breeding process takes in total only fifteen to thirty seconds.

The spawning continues for several more days, which exhausts the female. She may lay several hundred more eggs in the span of the spawning season, depending much on her size and reproductive fitness. The eggs rest in the depressions and will hatch in 4 days if they have successfully avoided predation.

The finescale dace has been seen to reproduce with the northern redbelly dace, Chrosomus eos, but produces hybrid offspring that are always females.

It is advantageous for females to grow larger and live longer than males. This way, they can reproduce longer and produce more eggs per spawn. The largest documented female, who was measured at 85 mm (3.3 in) long and approximately six years of age, was recorded in Minnesota. In a similar location, the largest recorded male was 58 mm (2.3 in) long and roughly five years of age. However, it is typical to find both sexes living to three or four years at an average length of 60–70 mm (2.4–2.8 in) long.

== Etymology ==
The species name Neogaeus comes from the Greek word meaning "new world".
