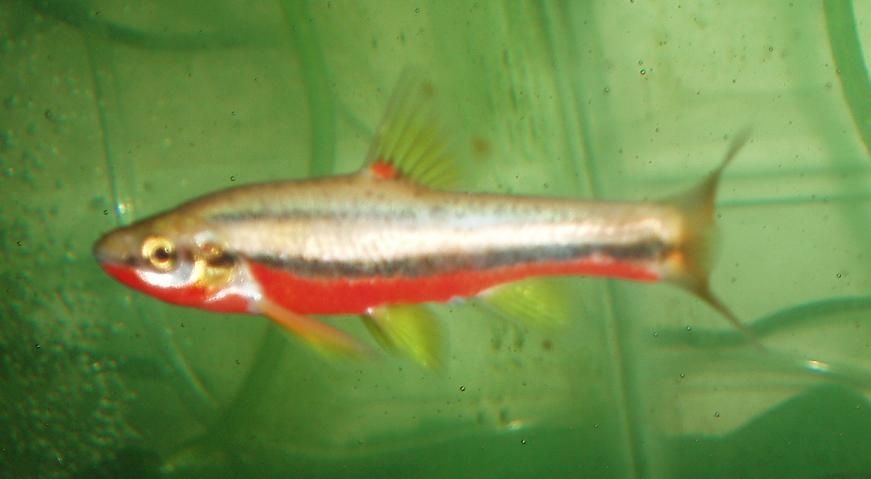
- Chrosomus erythrogaster

Scientific classification
- Kingdom: Animalia
- Phylum: Chordata
- Class: Actinopterygii
- Order: Cypriniformes
- Family: Leuciscidae
- Subfamily: Laviniinae
- Genus: Chrosomus; Rafinesque, 1820

Type species
- Luxilus erythrogaster Rafinesque, 1820

Synonyms
- Parchrosomus Gasowska, 1979; Pfrille D. S. Jordan, 1924

= Chrosomus =

Genus of fishes

Chrosomus is a genus of freshwater ray-finned fish belonging to the family Leuciscidae, which includes the daces, chubs and related fishes. The fishes in this genus are found in the eastern half of the United States and Canada. These fishes have sometimes been included in Eurasian minnow genus Phoxinus. They are the only members of the predominantly western subfamily Laviniinae that are found in eastern North America.

== Species ==
Chrosomuscontains the following species;

Image	Species	Common name
	Chrosomus cumberlandensis (W. C. Starnes & L. B. Starnes, 1978)	Blackside dace
	Chrosomus eos Cope, 1861	Northern redbelly dace
	Chrosomus erythrogaster Rafinesque, 1820	Southern redbelly dace
	Chrosomus neogaeus (Cope, 1867)	Finescale dace
	Chrosomus oreas Cope, 1868	Mountain redbelly dace
	Chrosomus saylori (Skelton, 2001)	Laurel dace
	Chrosomus tennesseensis (W. C. Starnes & R. E. Jenkins, 1988)	Tennessee dace
