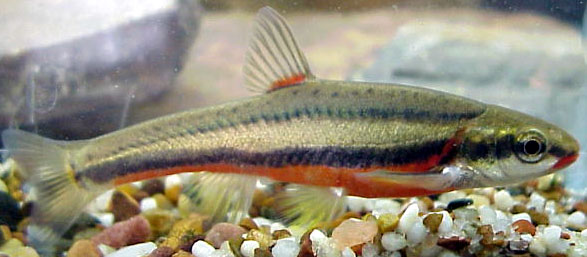

Conservation status
- Endangered (IUCN 3.1)

- Endangered (ESA)

Scientific classification
- Kingdom: Animalia
- Phylum: Chordata
- Class: Actinopterygii
- Division: Teleostei
- Order: Cypriniformes
- Family: Leuciscidae
- Subfamily: Laviniinae
- Genus: Chrosomus
- Species: C. saylori

Binomial name
- Chrosomus saylori (C. E. Skelton, 2001)

Synonyms
- Phoxinus saylori Skelton, 2001

= Laurel dace =

Species of fish

The laurel dace (Chrosomus saylori) is a species of freshwater ray-finned fish belonging to the family Leuciscidae, which includes the daces, chubs and related fishes. This species is restricted to the U.S. state of Tennessee. It was first discovered in 1976. A very rare species, it has only been found in localized populations in six small streams on the Walden Ridge portion of the Cumberland Plateau in Tennessee. It is found in six streams: the Soddy, Horn, Cupp, Young's, Moccasin, and Bumbee Creeks, all of which drain into larger rivers that eventually feed the Tennessee River. It is believed to be extirpated from Laurel Creek, the only other stream where it was known to occur.

It is commonly considered a nest associate and uses its large mouth and short intestinal tract to support an animal-based diet. Displaying sexual dimorphism, an average adult C. saylori measures approximately 45 mm (1.8 in) at the age of reproduction. Similar to other Chrosomus species, two dark parallel lines run the length of the body, and a red coloration appears during the breeding season. Spawning is believed to take place in small, cool streams, lined with small pebbles.

As of August 9, 2011, this species was placed on the endangered species list, as a result of agriculture, mining, and timbering in the Walden Creek area. This fish is threatened by increased sedimentation in its habitat, which occurs because surrounding hillsides have been logged, leading to erosion. This accumulation of silt makes the fish's spawning areas unsuitable. Such activities can cause erosion, which increases siltation, impeding spawning efforts. Eggs can be suffocated by sediment settling into the rocky streambeds.

The fish is named for ichthyologist Charles F. Saylor, who was one of the first to collect it. Its common name refers to mountain laurel (Kalmia spp.), which is a common plant next to the streams where it lives.

== Description ==
This minnow is 45.7 millimetres (1.80 in) long on average. It is olive green to tan in color with a silvery white underside. It has two black stripes on each side. During the breeding season the fish changes color, developing bright red coloration on the lower parts. Part of the dorsal fin becomes red, as do the lips. The stripes become a deeper black and there are more black areas on the head and breast. The cheeks and the area between the black stripes become gold. Most of the fins turn yellow. Females and males both change colors, but the male's colors are more intense. Otherwise, female and male can be told apart by the shape of the pectoral fins.

== Ecology ==
Because C. saylori is a relatively recent discovery, a detailed life study has not been performed. However, it is known to take shelter in the riparian zones of creeks, where vegetation provides shelter. Because of this, it is extremely susceptible to changes, or the absence of such stream-side plants. They are generally found in cool, slow moving water, or pools containing small rocks, boulders, and rubble. This type of streambed is easily influenced by an increase in siltation. C. saylori are also susceptible to warmer water temperatures, above 25 °C (77 °F). The localized populations may be the result of pockets of the preferred, cooler water surrounded by warmer water.

After analyzing the stomach contents, it was found that the diet of C. saylori is mostly animal material. It was mostly benthic insect larvae, as well as plant material and sand grains. Similar to other fish species with animal-based diets, they have large mouths, short intestines, a reduced number of pharyngeal teeth, and a primitively shaped basiocciptial bone. C. saylori are often found feeding in loosely grouped schools.

== Life history ==
This species is characterized by two horizontal, uninterrupted black lines that run the length of the body which distinguish it from other similar species. Nuptial males have black pigment covering the breast and underside of head. Their intestines are loosely coiled in an S-configuration, and have a winged basioccipital pharyngeal pad, as opposed to rounded. Very little is known about the reproductive strategies of C. saylori because so little is known about the species in general. The species has been observed spending time around gravel beds with small pebbles, as well as spending time around gravel-bed nests made by other species. Yet, it is still unclear as to what actually happens, apart from spawning in gravel beds. This trait alone, however, may be its downfall. Redds, or gravel-pebble spawning beds, are hugely impacted by any increase in siltation in the water. When the sediments sink and settle into these rocky areas, they can easily smother the eggs and ruin an entire breeding season. Therefore, this species is at a serious risk.

== Management ==
Because this species is so rare, only to be found in six streams, it has been listed as an endangered species. As of 2007, the species was listed as a candidate. As of September 8, 2011, this species was officially protected as an endangered species under the Endangered Species Act of 1973. C. saylori is most threatened by an increase in siltation that can cause serious damage to spawning grounds. Such an increase can be caused by a variety of events, including the removal of riparian vegetation and timber removal progress in the nearby area surrounding these particular streams in which C. saylori can be found. In 1883, the Walden Ridge railroad moved into the area allowing for the transport of timber, which cause a boom in timber output. However, trees that stand near streams are responsible for holding the rich soil in place, preventing it from being washed away and eroded by the stream. The removal of such trees through mining often results in stream bank erosion, causing an increase in siltation. In addition, nearby mining practices are known to have bad stream side management zones and problems with roadside construction. Two current projects are of greatest concern for this species including the installation of a water line crossing through a populated creek, and building an impoundment on a tributary to an occupied stream. These activities result in great danger for the C. saylori species.

However, some efforts are being made to protect this fish. In 1992, an organization dedicated to aquatic conservation called Conservation Fisheries Inc. was established. It is responsible for monitoring and restoring at-risk populations such a C. saylori. They work throughout the southeast, using a variety of methods of management. Because the danger to this species is not yet dire, as they are still quite abundant in these areas, this organization is not currently taking action with C. saylori. They are able to raise them in hatcheries and are monitoring the populations, waiting for any indication of trouble.

Due to a drought affecting southeastern Tennessee, 105 laurel dace were removed from their habitat in Walden Ridge in July 2024 and relocated to the Tennessee Aquarium Conservation Institute in Chattanooga, Tennessee. One fish did not survive relocation, and the 104 remaining dace are planned to be repatriated once normal stream flows resume. Since 2012, the laurel dace has been extirpated from three streams in the region due to habitat degradation.
