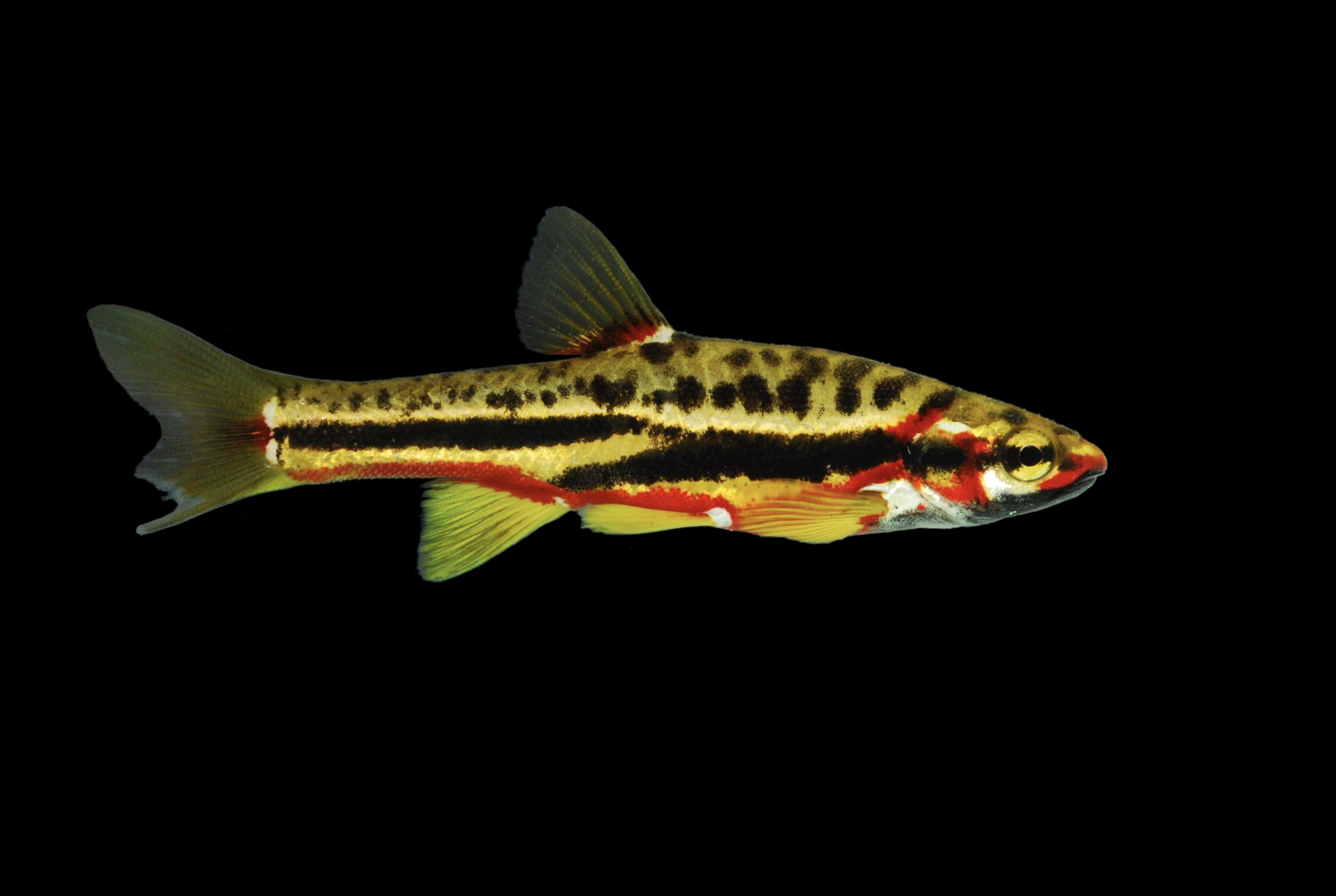

Conservation status
- Least Concern (IUCN 3.1)

- Secure (NatureServe)

Scientific classification
- Kingdom: Animalia
- Phylum: Chordata
- Class: Actinopterygii
- Division: Teleostei
- Order: Cypriniformes
- Family: Leuciscidae
- Genus: Chrosomus
- Species: C. oreas

Binomial name
- Chrosomus oreas Cope, 1868

Synonyms
- Phoxinus oreas (Cope, 1868)

= Mountain redbelly dace =

Species of fish

The mountain redbelly dace (Chrosomus oreas) is a species of freshwater ray-finned fish belonging to the family Leuciscidae, which includes the daces, chubs, and related fishes. It is found in mountain and Piedmont regions of the Atlantic slope of North America from the Shenandoah River in Virginia, to the Neuse River drainage in North Carolina and the upper New River drainage in West Virginia, Virginia, and North Carolina.

== Description ==
They are notable for a dark stripe across their midline that is misaligned under their dorsal fin, small blotches on the dorsal area of their bodies, a small body and mouth, and fine scales. Nuptial males will have more vibrant reds on their belly and fins that are yellow to chartreuse. There are no scales on the cheeks or operculum of the mountain redbelly dace and they have a forked tail. They have a singular dorsal fin, along with a pelvic fin that is positioned right underneath the dorsal fin.

== Distribution ==
In Virginia waters, they are known to live for about 5 years and will grow up to about 55 millimeters or 2.1 inches in length. They are native in many of the streams in Virginia such as the ones across the ecological regions of Piedmont, Ridge and Valley, and Costal Plains. Due to what is likely the result of illegally discarded live bait by anglers, they have also been introduced into the southwest of Virginia, like the ecological regions in Holston and Big Sandy watersheds.

Overall, they have been spotted non-indigenously in many Hydrologic Unit Codes (HUCs), these being seven HUCs in North Carolina, one HUC in Pennsylvania, one HUC in Tennessee, and ten HUCs in Virginia. There are currently no studies that tell of the impact of the non-indigenous introduction of these fish.

== Habitat and Biology ==
The mountain redbelly dace prefers to live in complex habitats within free-flowing streams, these typically being places with silt-free gravel, wood, or plants. They do best in medium-sized streams that have riffles, runs, and pools with moderate flows due to their need for clean water, generous amounts of oxygen, and different spaces that they can use during their biological life cycle.

They are considered tropic generalists who will eat a ranged diet, such as algae and other organisms.

They reproduce from around April to June, typically building on the gravel nests of nest building fish. Males are usually territorial and at nesting locations they will swarm single females. Similar spawning strategies with other species result in introgression at the sites.
