= Stripetail darter =

Conservation status
- Least Concern (IUCN 3.1)

Scientific classification
- Kingdom: Animalia
- Phylum: Chordata
- Class: Actinopterygii
- Order: Perciformes
- Family: Percidae
- Genus: Etheostoma
- Species: E. kennicotti

Binomial name
- Etheostoma kennicotti (Putnam, 1863)

Synonyms
- Catonotus kennicotti Putnam, 1863

Species of fish

The stripetail darter (Etheostoma kennicotti) is a species of freshwater ray-finned fish, a darter from the subfamily Etheostomatinae, part of the family Percidae, which also contains the perches, ruffes and pikeperches. It is endemic to the eastern United States. It is found in small rivers and streams in the states of Tennessee, Ohio, Kentucky, Illinois, Alabama, Georgia, and Mississippi. Males are a golden-orange color with black barring on the fins, and grow to a length of about 2.8 in (7 cm). This fish feeds on midge larvae and other small invertebrates. It breeds in the spring; eggs are attached to the substrate, often under slab rocks, where they are guarded by the male. The population trend of this fish seems to be stable and it is a common species with numerous sub-populations over a wide range, and the International Union for Conservation of Nature has assessed its conservation status as being of "least concern".

== Description ==
The stripetail darter males are golden orange and as adults can grow up to 2.8 inches (7.1 cm) long. It also has black bands present on the caudal fins and soft dorsal fins.

== Distribution and habitat ==
The stripetail darter is a small, benthic freshwater fish that inhabits river tributaries. Historic or native geographic range of the stripetail darter is likely similar to its current range. Currently, the stripetail darter inhabits tributaries of the Ohio, Tennessee, Cumberland, and Paint Rock river systems. The Green River drainage in Kentucky also contains a population of stripetail darters. The Paint Rock river system and Ohio River systems hold the largest populations of the species and it is less common throughout the Tennessee River system. The stripetail darter inhabits states including Tennessee, Ohio, Kentucky, Illinois, Alabama, Georgia, and Mississippi. The stripetail darter's distribution is typically spotty throughout its range with multiple subpopulations; however, the species is still abundant overall. Page and Smith discovered that the species also varies slightly depending on where the subpopulation of the species occurs. This isolation of the populations could be due to climate effects such as low temperatures and low water levels. The current estimated population is over 10,000 individuals through the range of this fish. The population is stable.

== Ecology ==
The diet of the stripetail darter includes mayflies, fishflies, midge larvae, isopods, stoneflies, and cladocerans. Stripetail darters are able to live in a wide range of pH levels and water temperatures. Typically these darters also live in slab pools in streams and headwaters, as well as creeks and small slow-flowing rivers with rocky substrate and rubble, in riffles, under stones and under overhanging banks in pools; it often occurs among emergent vegetation.

== Life history ==
The breeding season for the stripetail darter in lower Ohio River tributaries begins in late March to early April and continues until late May. Stripetails breed in water between 57 and 68 °F (14 and 20 °C). Stripetail darter eggs are small, between 0.075 to 0.098 inches (1.9 to 2.5 mm) in diameter, spherical and adhesive. The eggs are usually laid under slabrocks in medium-sized or smaller streams that feed into larger bodies of water. The slabrocks provide shelter and protection for the eggs and allow males to guard them more efficiently. The stripetail also prefers overhanging vegetation to be present near the spawning sites and gravel or sandy bottoms. The stripetail darter lays anywhere from 50 to 400 eggs at a time. Newly hatched stripetail darters are typically around .16 to .19 inches (4.1 to 4.8 mm) in length and have fully developed pectoral fins with 12 incipient rays. Stripetails reach sexual maturity one year after birth. The maximum lifespan of this fish is 3 years.

== Conservation ==
As of 2013, there are no management plans in place specifically aimed at the conservation of the stripetail darter. They are not listed on the endangered species list and their populations are considered stable. It is estimated that over 10,000 are alive in the wild today and this number is high enough for sustainability.

== Taxonomy and etymology ==
The stripetail darter was first formally described as Catonotus kennicotti in 1863 by the American zoologist Frederic Ward Putnam (1839–1914). The specific name honors the collector of the type, Mr R. Kennicott.
