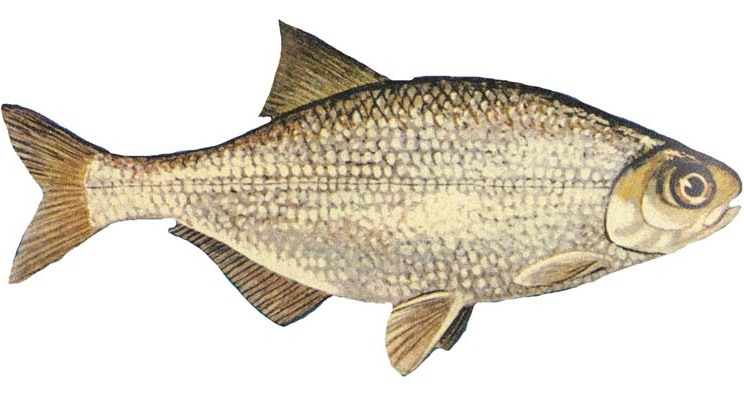
- Hiodon tergisus

Scientific classification
- Kingdom: Animalia
- Phylum: Chordata
- Class: Actinopterygii
- Cohort: Osteoglossomorpha
- Order: Hiodontiformes; Taverne, 1979

Type species
- Hiodon tergisus (Lesueur, 1818)

Families
- Hiodontidae (mooneyes)

= Hiodontiformes =

Order of ray-finned fishes

Hiodontiformes /haɪəˈdɒntɪfɔːrmiːz/ is an order of ray-finned fish consisting of the two living species of the mooneye family, Hiodontidae, and three extinct genera.

These are traditionally classified within the order Osteoglossiformes, a placement some authorities still follow. Fossil study of the extinct genus Yanbiania suggests that the hiodontids separated from other osteoglossomorphs early and thus may deserve a separate order.

== Taxonomy ==
- Order Hiodontiformes McAllister 1968 sensu Taverne 1979
  - Genus †Chetungichthys Chang & Chou 1977
    - †Chetungichthys brevicephalus Chang & Chou 1977
    - †Chetungichthys dalinghensis Su 1991
  - Genus †Yanbiania Li 1987
    - †Yanbiania wangqingica Li 1987
  - Genus †Plesiolycoptera Zhang & Zhou 1976
    - †Plesiolycoptera daqingensis Zhang & Zhou 1976
    - †Plesiolycoptera parvus ((Sytchevskaya, 1986) (syn Eohiodon (Gobihiodon) parvus Sytchevskaya, 1986)
  - Family Hiodontidae (mooneyes) Valenciennes 1846 sensu stricto
    - Genus Hiodon Lesueur 1818 [(syn: Amphiodon Rafinesque 1819 non Huber 1909; Hiodon (Amphiodon) (Rafinesque 1819); Hiodon (Clodalus) Rafinesque 1820; Clodalus (Rafinesque 1820); Hiodon (Elattonistius) Gill & Jordan ex Jordan 1877; Elattonistius (Gill & Jordan ex Jordan 1877); Glossodon Rafinesque 1818 non Heckel 1843; Eohiodon Cavender 1966)
      - Hiodon alosoides (goldeye) (Rafinesque 1819)
      - †Hiodon consteniorum Li & Wilson 1994
      - †Hiodon falcatus (Grande, 1979) (syn Eohiodon falcatus (Grande, 1979))
      - †Hiodon rosei (Hussakof 1916) (syn Eohiodon rosei (Hussakof 1916); Leucisus rosei Hussakof, 1916)
      - Hiodon tergisus (mooneye) Lesueur 1818
      - †Hiodon woodruffi Wilson, 1978
      - †Hiodon shuyangensis Shen 1989 (nom dubium, possibly an immature Phareodus)
