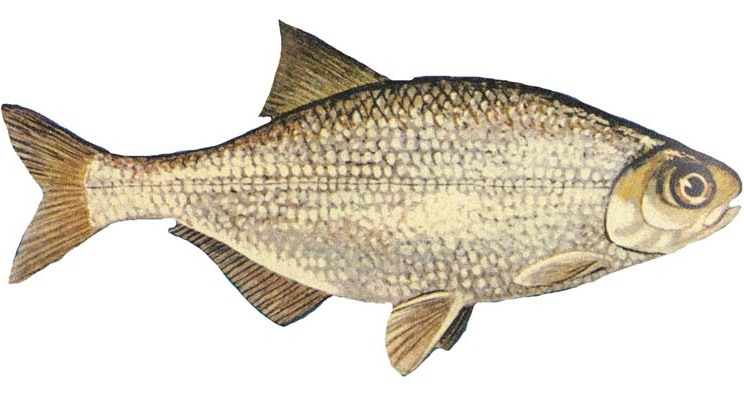

Conservation status
- Least Concern (IUCN 3.1)

- Secure (NatureServe)

Scientific classification
- Kingdom: Animalia
- Phylum: Chordata
- Class: Actinopterygii
- Order: Hiodontiformes
- Family: Hiodontidae
- Genus: Hiodon
- Species: H. tergisus

Binomial name
- Hiodon tergisus (Lesueur, 1818)
- Mooneye range in green

Synonyms
- Glossodon harengoides Rafinesque 1818; Glossodon heterurus Rafinesque 1818; Hyodon vernalis Rafinesque 1820; Cyprinus (Abramis) smithii Smith ex Richardson 1836; Abramis smithii (Richardson 1836); Glossodon smithii (Richardson 1836); Hyodon selenops Jordan & Bean 1877

= Hiodon tergisus =

Mooneye

Species of fish

Hiodon tergisus, the mooneye, is a freshwater fish that is widespread across eastern North America.

== Anatomy and appearance ==
H. tergisus is characterized by its silvery appearance, strongly compressed deep body, and keel that extends from its anal to pelvic fin. Adult mooneyes reach an average length of 29.8 centimeters (11.7 in) and may reach up to 45 centimeters (18 in). They weigh an average of 226 grams (8.0 oz).

== Distribution ==
Mooneyes are endemic to eastern North America. They can be found as far north as the Hudson Bay and as far south as the Mississippi Delta. They have been found as far west as central Alberta, Canada, and as far east as the western edge of North Carolina. Historically, mooneyes have been found in all of the Great Lakes, excluding Lake Superior. Their populations in Lake Michigan and Lake Erie have been declining. Furthermore, their current distribution is becoming more confined to larger rivers, whereas historically they have inhabited much smaller tributaries. The historical distribution of H. tergisus may not be fully accurate due to the misidentification with other species, such as gizzard shad and alewifes. The difference between current and historical distributions may be due to the construction of dams that restrict fish from migrating from smaller rivers to large rivers. Factors such as climate change and pollution may also affect their distributions.

== Ecology ==
Mooneyes inhabit clear river and lake environments. They are mostly intolerant of turbid waters and are usually active during the day. As surface feeders, they eat primarily aquatic and terrestrial insects, but they are also known to eat crustaceans, mollusks, and small fish. Young mooneyes tend to feed in more benthic regions, eating immature caddisflies, mayflies, midges, corixids, and plecopterans. Although no predators of adult mooneyes are known, young mooneyes are susceptible to predation by larger piscivorous fish. Two trematode parasites specific to H. tergisus are Crepidostomum hiodontos and Paurorhynchus hiodontis. Researchers believe these parasites are derived from ingested food items. Thus far, no research has been done on how or if these parasites affect populations and ecology of mooneyes. H. tergisus has latitudinal variation in growth rates in which northern populations mature faster than southern populations. This may be due to less turbidity in the northern latitudes.

== Lifecycle ==
Mooneyes are spring spawners. Since their distribution varies greatly in latitudinal gradient, southern populations spawn much sooner than northern populations, in March and April compared to June and July, respectively. Each spring, adult mooneyes migrate upstream to clearer waters to spawn. Females are capable of producing 10,000-20,000 semibuoyant eggs each year. They prefer clear-running water and solid substrates when spawning. Newly hatched larvae are 8–9 millimeters (0.31–0.35 in) in length and mostly inhabit the limnetic portion of the water column. Mooneyes eat larval forms of mayflies, caddisflies, and midges during the first few months after hatching. Mooneyes exhibit rapid growth within their first year, reaching up to 20 centimeters (7.9 in). Adult mooneyes reach an average length of 29.8 centimeters (11.7 in). Females reach sexual maturity at four to five years and males reach sexual maturity at three, and will continue to spawn every year after. Males live up to seven years and females are capable of living up to nine years.

== Conservation and management ==
Currently, H. tergisus is listed as threatened in New York, North Carolina, and Michigan. Although mooneyes inhabit much of eastern North America, many of their habitats are isolated or discontinuous, so if an isolated population goes extinct or begins to go extinct, no influx of outside mooneyes can take their place. Furthermore, the development of agricultural and industrial practices has led to low water quality. H. tergisus, along with other pollution-intolerant fish in the Ohio River, have migrated north away from polluted waters over the past 20 years. According to the New York State Department of Environmental Conservation, the decline in population may be due to increased siltation or competition with newly introduced species. Dams are another factor affecting not only mooneye populations, but also a variety of other fish species. Dams are particularly bad due to their ability to block migration routes of mooneyes and other species. Currently, no direct management efforts for H. tergisus are active.
