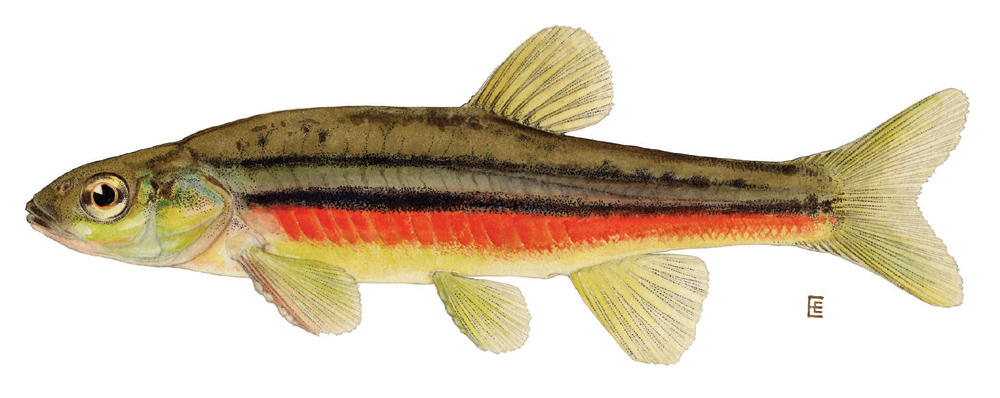

Conservation status
- Least Concern (IUCN 3.1)

- Secure (NatureServe)

Scientific classification
- Kingdom: Animalia
- Phylum: Chordata
- Class: Actinopterygii
- Order: Cypriniformes
- Family: Leuciscidae
- Genus: Chrosomus
- Species: C. eos

Binomial name
- Chrosomus eos Cope, 1861

Synonyms
- Phoxinus eos (Cope, 1861); Chrosomus dakotensis Evermann & Cox, 1896

= Northern redbelly dace =

Fresh water cyprinid fish

The northern redbelly dace (Chrosomus eos) is a species of freshwater ray-finned fish belonging to the family Leuciscidae, which includes the daces, chubs and related fishes. These fishes are generally found in lakes and small streams in the northeastern United States and eastern Canada. Ranging from 1–3 inches, it is one of forty-four species from the minnow and carp family of Cyprinidae in these areas.

== Description ==
The northern redbelly dace is a minnow about 2-4 inches long with two dusky, longitudinal stripes along its sides under an iridescent silver back. The top stripe often becomes broken into dots behind the dorsal fin. Small, almost invisible scales cover its body. The lower sides of its body are white, yellow, or silver. However, during the breeding season, this area becomes brilliant red on the males. The females likewise exhibit a colorful, green ventral stripe. Helpful identifying characteristics are its long coiling intestines and the black peritoneum (lining of the body cavity). Its lateral line is incomplete and consists of 70 to 90 lateral line scales.

The northern redbelly dace has thin, flexible rays called "soft-rays". It possesses a pair of pectoral fins, pelvic fins in the ventral and abdominal positions, which all are white, yellow, or silver. No adipose fin can be found after the dorsal fin on its back. The caudal fin or tail fin is notched and homocercal. This means that the tail has two lobes that are symmetrical.

== Distribution and habitat ==
The northern redbelly dace ranges from Nova Scotia and Prince Edward Island westward curving in a narrow band through southern Canada, as well as, the northern and north-central United States. This encompasses Pennsylvania to Michigan, Wisconsin, and north through Minnesota and North East Iowa to the Peace-Mackenzie drainage in British Columbia as well as the Northwest Territories. In the United States the northern redbelly dace can be found in Maine, New Hampshire, New York, Pennsylvania, Michigan, Wisconsin, Minnesota, North and South Dakota, Nebraska, and Colorado.

The northern redbelly dace can be found in cool, quiet, boggy streams and lakes. The typical habitat conditions of small streams where the dace lives include: water supplied by clear, cool springs or seeps, absence of strong currents, effective cover like undercut banks and heavy brushy vegetation, and minimal large piscivorous fish populations. Small lake habitats also share these characteristics. Typically the lakes are clear and spring-fed with heavy vegetation (at least by shore) and few predatory fishes.

However, in states where it is vulnerable or endangered, it can only be found in extreme head waters of clear streams and spring-fed seepage pools. These locations provide a cold water habitat much like the conditions 1,000 years ago with glaciers to the north. Human activities have led to the reduction of cold-water streams and seepage, which reduces the suitable habitat for this Northern species.

== Feeding ==
The northern redbelly dace feeds mainly on filamentous algae and diatoms, but also zooplankton and aquatic insect larvae. Their predators consist of other fish, kingfishers and water fowl especially mergansers. In small lakes where no piscivores live, the northern redbelly dace fills the niche of a planktivore. However, in larger lakes, it is restricted to the vegetation mats by shore where it must compete with other minnows for food.

== Importance to humans ==
The northern redbelly dace has a direct economic value to humans as it is a popular baitfish used by many anglers across Ontario. Furthermore, as a minnow it is a primary consumer that feeds on algae. As such, it provides food to predators, particularly large fish and water fowl, which are game for fishers and hunters.

== Conservation status ==
Throughout Canada, Minnesota, Wisconsin, Michigan, and the New England States, northern redbelly dace populations are considered stable. However, in areas such as Nebraska, Colorado, and South Dakota they are vulnerable following the retreat of the Wisconsin Ice Sheet.

Unfortunately, the northern redbelly dace is Endangered in several states, one of which is Massachusetts. The reasons for its decline are unknown, but possible threats include erosion and sedimentation, along with flow alterations.

== Reproduction and life cycle ==
The northern redbelly dace reaches sexual maturity by its second or third summer and may live up to eight years. Spawning begins in the spring around May and continues into early August. Adult fish can spawn multiple times during the season. Nonadhesive eggs are laid in filamentous algae and hatch eight to ten days later at a water temperature of 21–27 °C.

== Etymology of the name ==
The word "dace" originated in the early fifteenth century from the Old French word "darz", which means to dart. This fish was so called for its movements. Another theory traces it to the Medieval Latin word "darsus" also meaning to dart, said to be of Gaulish origin.
