= List of fishes of Missouri =

List of Missouri fishes

Found in the table below are fish found in Missouri separated by the Family that they are in. The list is not complete as there are over 200 species of fish found in Missouri.

Common name	Scientific name	Picture	Habitat	Notes
	Acipenseridae (family)			
Lake sturgeon	Acipenser fulvescens		Bottom of lakes and big rivers over sand, gravel, or rock bottom	Endangered
	Amiidae (family)			
Bowfin	Amia calva		Sloughs, sluggish rivers to medium rivers with moderate flow	
	Anguillidae (family)			
American eel	Anguilla rostrate		Large rivers w/ moderate flow	
	Atherinidae (family)			
Brook silverside	Labidesthes sicculus		Clear, warm waters without current, backwaters, overflow pools of large streams	
	Catostomidae (family)			
River carpsucker	Carpiodes carpio		Lakes, reservoirs, large sluggish rivers	
Quillback	Carpiodes cyprinus		Large to medium sized rivers with swift flow, lakes	
Highfin carpsucker	Carpiodes velifer		Lakes, reservoirs, large sluggish rivers	
White sucker	Catostomus commersonii		Rocky pools of small cool streams or big rivers, lakes	
Blue sucker	Cycleptus elongates		Deep channels of large rivers with swift flow	Endangered
Northern hogsucker	Hypentelium nigricans		Rocky riffles, flowing pools of cool small to medium streams	
Bigmouth buffalo	Ictiobus cyprinellus		Streams, rivers, bayous, backwaters, lakes	
Black buffalo	Ictiobus niger		Deep waters of medium to large-sized rivers, lakes	
Smallmouth buffalo	Ictiobus bubalus		Medium to large-sized rivers, lakes	
Spotted sucker	Minytrema melanops		Large rivers, streams with deep pools, sloughs, backwaters	
Silver redhorse	Moxostoma anisurum		Muddy to rocky bottom pools, small streams to big rivers	
River redhorse	Moxostoma carinatum		Small streams, rivers with moderate current over gravel bottom	
Black redhorse	Moxostoma duquesnei		Lakes, river pools with sand or rock bottom	
Golden redhorse	Moxostoma erythrurum		Clear pools of large rivers, moderate flowing small streams with sandy or gravel bottom	
Shorthead redhorse	Moxostoma macrolepidotum		Rocky pools and riffles, small streams, large rivers	
	Centrarchidae (family)			
Shadow bass	Ambloplites ariommus		Cool clear streams with moderate flow, logs, roots of live trees	
Ozark bass	Ambloplites constellatus		Cool clear streams with moderate flow, logs, roots of live trees	
Rock bass	Ambloplites rupestris		Cool clear streams with moderate flow, logs, roots of live trees	
Flier	Centrarchus macropterus		Sluggish streams, ditches, wetlands with heavy vegetation	
Green sunfish	Lepomis cyanellus		Clear to muddy water, small streams and big rivers, lakes, reservoirs	
Warmouth	Lepomis gulosus		Sluggish streams, ponds, lakes, wetlands with vegetation, flooded trees	
Orangespotted sunfish	Lepomis humilis		Sluggish, slow flowing rivers and streams with muddy bottom	
Bluegill	Lepomis macrochirus		Pools in warm, clear streams with moderate flow, ditches, ponds, lakes	
Dollar sunfish	Lepomis marginatus		Sluggish streams, backwaters, bayous	
Longear sunfish	Lepomis megalotis		Slow pools in moderate flowing small to large streams with rocky bottoms, lakes	
Redear sunfish	Lepomis microlophus		Pools in slow moving warm streams, ponds, lakes with vegetation	
Redspotted sunfish	Lepomis miniatus		Small to moderate flowing streams with slow current, oxbows, swamps	
Smallmouth bass	Micropterus dolomieu		Cool, clear, rocky streams with moderate flow, deep reservoirs	
Spotted bass	Micropterus punctulatus		Warm creeks and rivers with pools, deep reservoirs	
Largemouth bass	Micropterus salmoides		Slow moving streams, farm ponds, lakes, reservoirs	
White crappie	Pomoxis annularis		Lakes, reservoirs, large ponds, moderate streams	
Black crappie	Pomoxis nigromaculatus		Lakes, reservoirs, large ponds, clear streams	
	Clupeidae (family)			
Gizzard shad	Dorosoma cepedianum		Quiet water habitats, lowland lakes, pounds, pools, backwaters of streams and rivers	
	Cottidae (family)			
Banded sculpin	Cottus carolinae		Quiet water habitats, lowland lakes, pounds, pools, backwaters of streams and rivers	
Grotto sculpin	Cottus specus		Found in 5 caves and one stream in Perry County	Endangered
	Cyprinidae (family)			
Common carp	Cyprinus carpio		Lakes, reservoirs, ponds, ditches, rivers, creeks	Invasive
	Xenocyprididae (family)			
Grass carp	Clenopharyngodon idella		Large rivers, streams, ponds, lakes	Invasive
Silver carp	Hypophthalmichthys molitrix		Large rivers and lakes	Invasive
Bighead carp	Hypophthalmichthys nobilis		Large rivers and lakes	Invasive
Black carp	Mylopharyngodon piceus		Lakes, rivers, streams – escaped from a fish farm during a high water event	Invasive
	Leuciscidae (family)			
Central stoneroller	Campostoma pullum		Small to medium sized streams with moderate to high gradients and rocky or bedrock substrates in or near riffles	
Cypress minnow	Hybognathus hayi		Backwaters of large, sluggish rivers, oxbow	Endangered
Common shiner	Luxilus cornutus		Small, moderately clear streams, gravel and rubble bottoms, bedrock pools	
Duskystripe shiner	Luxilus pilsbryi		Stream pools with clean gravel bottoms	
Bleeding shiner	Luxilus zonatus		Midwaters, small creeks, large rivers, clean, gravelly or rocky bottoms, near riffles or in pools	
Hornyhead chub	Nocomis biguttatus		Clear streams with permanent flow and clean gravel	
Golden shiner	Notemigonus crysoleucas		Sloughs, ponds, lakes, quiet pools of streams	
Fathead minnow	Pimephales promelas		Mid water or near bottom, streams, pools	
Flathead chub	Platygobio gracilis		Big rivers, bottom composed of sand and fine gravel	Endangered
Creek chub	Semotilus atromaculatus		Pools in headwater streams, large rivers with rocky bottom	
	Esocidae (family)			
Grass pickerel	Esox americanus vermiculatus		Small headwater streams	
Northern pike	Esox lucius		Lakes, reservoirs, rivers, streams with vegetation	
Muskellunge	Esox masquinongy		Clear waters of weedy lakes and medium rivers	
Chain pickerel	Esox niger		Lakes, reservoirs, rivers, streams with vegetation	
	Fundulidae (family)			
Blackspotted topminnow	Fundulus olivaceus		Large lowland rivers, pools of streams	
Blackstripe topminnow	Fundulus notatus		Large lowland rivers, pools of streams	
	Hiodontidae (family)			
Goldeye	Hiodon alosoides		Large rivers, backwaters, lake	
	Ictaluridae (family)			
Black bullhead	Ameiurus melas		Slow flowing streams, oxbows, backwaters with mud bottom	
Brown bullhead	Ameiurus nebulosus		Oxbows, backwaters with mud bottom, slow flowing streams	
Yellow bullhead	Ameiurus natalis		Slow flowing streams, backwaters, vegetated ponds, lakes	
White bullhead	Ameiurus catus		Clear streams, dam tail waters	
Blue catfish	Ictalurus furcatus		Rivers and large creeks with fast water over sandy or rocky bottoms	
Channel catfish	Ictalurus punctatus		Ponds, lakes, moderate-flowing rivers and creeks with sandy or gravel bottoms	
Mountain madtom	Noturus eleutherus		Large, moderately clear rivers	Endangered
Stonecat	Noturus flavus		Clear, gravel-bottom streams	
Neosho madtom	Noturus placidus		Medium to large stream, clear waters	Endangered
Flathead catfish	Pylodictis olivaris		Large rivers and creeks with flow near logs, roots, rocks, and debris	
	Lepisosteidae (family)			
Alligator gar	Atractosteus spatula		Large slow flowing rivers, lakes, bayous, reservoirs	
Shortnose gar	Lepisosteus platostomus		Muddy rivers, oxbows, backwaters, lakes	
Longnose gar	Lepisosteus osseus		Bayous, backwaters, oxbows, large creeks, rivers, lakes	
	Moronidae (family)			
Hybrid striped bass	Morone chrysops x Morone saxatilis		Large streams with moderate flow, sandy or rocky bottom, reservoirs	
White bass	Morone chrysops		Large streams with moderate flow, sandy or rocky bottom, reservoirs	
Striped bass	Morone saxatilis		Large deep reservoirs	
	Percidae (family)			
Crystal darter	Crystallaria asprella		Open channels of large, clear streams	Endangered
Greenside darter	Etheostoma blennioides		Swift to moderate current streams and rivers	
Arkansas darter	Etheostoma cragini		Shallow, spring branches and spring-fed creeks with sandy bottoms – found in Spring River system of the southwestern Ozarks	
Harlequin darter	Etheostoma histrio		Streams and ditches, prefers sandy bottoms where logs, sticks, and other organic debris are present	Endangered
Johnny darter	Etheostoma nigrum		Pools, slow moving riffles in sandy streams	
Goldstripe darter	Etheostoma parvipinne		Small, shallow, spring fed streams, with low to moderate gradient	Endangered
Logperch	Percina caprodes		Deep riffles and silt free pools, small to medium sized rivers	
Sauger	Sander canadensis		Turbid water in streams and rivers with moderate or fast flow, large lakes, reservoirs	
Walleye	Sander vitreus		Deep water of large streams, lakes, reservoirs with sandy or rocky bottom	
	Petromyzontidae (family)			
Chestnut lamprey	Ichthyomyzon castaneus		Large streams and small rivers, large reservoirs	
	Polyodontidae (family)			
Paddlefish	Polyodon spathula		Channels in large rivers to medium rivers with moderate flow	
	Sciaenidae (family)			
Freshwater drum	Aplodinotus grunniens		Medium to large rivers, lakes, reservoirs with deep water	
	Salmonidae (family)			
Rainbow trout	Oncorhynchus mykiss		Large rivers to small streams, lakes, below dams	
Brown trout	Salmo trutta		Lakes, small streams, large rivers	
	Umbridae (family)			
Central mudminnow	Umbra limi		Bogs, sloughs, swamps, sluggish streams	Endangered
