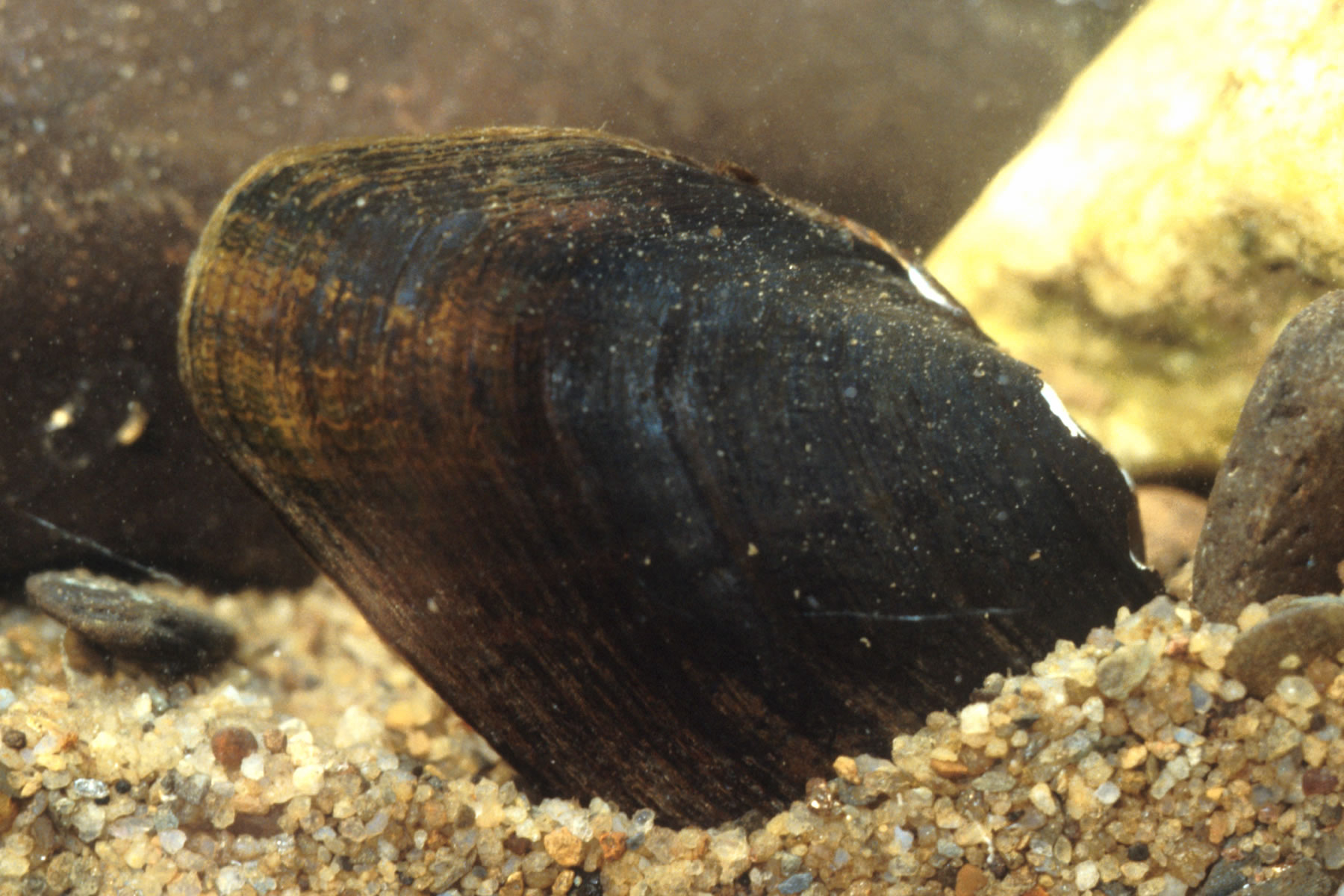

Conservation status
- Critically Endangered (IUCN 2.3)
- CITES Appendix I (CITES)

Scientific classification
- Kingdom: Animalia
- Phylum: Mollusca
- Class: Bivalvia
- Order: Unionida
- Family: Unionidae
- Genus: Villosa
- Species: V. trabalis

Binomial name
- Villosa trabalis (Conrad, 1834)

Synonyms
- List: Venustaconcha trabalis (Conrad, 1834); Eurynia (Micromya) perpurpurea (I. Lea, 1861); Lampsilis (Eurynia) perpurpurea (I. Lea, 1861); Lampsilis (Venustaconcha) trabalis (Conrad, 1834); Margaron (Unio) perpurpureus (I. Lea, 1861); Micromya perpurpurea (I. Lea, 1861); Micromya trabalis (Conrad, 1834); Unio perpurpureus I. Lea, 1861; Unio trabalis Conrad, 1834; Villosa perpurpurea (I. Lea, 1861)

= Villosa trabalis =

Species of bivalve

Villosa trabalis, the Cumberland bean pearly mussel, Cumberland bean, or purple bean, is a species of freshwater mussel, an aquatic bivalve mollusk in the family Unionidae.

This species is endemic to the United States. It can be found in Virginia, Kentucky, and Tennessee, is likely extirpated from Alabama, and possibly extirpated from North Carolina and Georgia. Its natural habitat is riffles in streams or rivers. It is threatened by habitat loss.

It is a federally listed endangered species, having received the designation from the U.S. Fish and Wildlife Service in 1976. It is also protected under Appendix I of the Convention on International Trade in Endangered Species of Wild Fauna and Flora.
