= Schistura sexcauda =

Conservation status
- Least Concern (IUCN 3.1)

Scientific classification
- Kingdom: Animalia
- Phylum: Chordata
- Class: Actinopterygii
- Order: Cypriniformes
- Family: Nemacheilidae
- Genus: Schistura
- Species: S. sexcauda

Binomial name
- Schistura sexcauda (Fowler, 1937)

Synonyms
- Noemacheilus fowlerianus Smith, 1945; Nemacheilus sexcauda Fowler, 1937; Schistura fowleriana (Smith, 1945)

Species of fish

Schistura sexcauda is a species of ray-finned fish, a stone loach, in the genus Schistura. It is found in the basin of the Chao Phraya River in central Thailand where it has been recorded in streams with a moderate to fast current and in riffles, over substrates consisting of gravel to stone. It is known to be raised in local subsistence fisheries and traded both nationally and internationally as an ornamental fish.

Some authorities regard Schistura fowleriana as a synonym of this species.

== Etymology ==
The genus name Schistura refers to the fish's forked caudal fins, coming from the Greek schizein and oura meaning respectively "to divide" and "tail". The species name sexcauda comes from Latin sex and cauda meaning "six" and "tail", referring to the six bar markings behind its dorsal fin.
