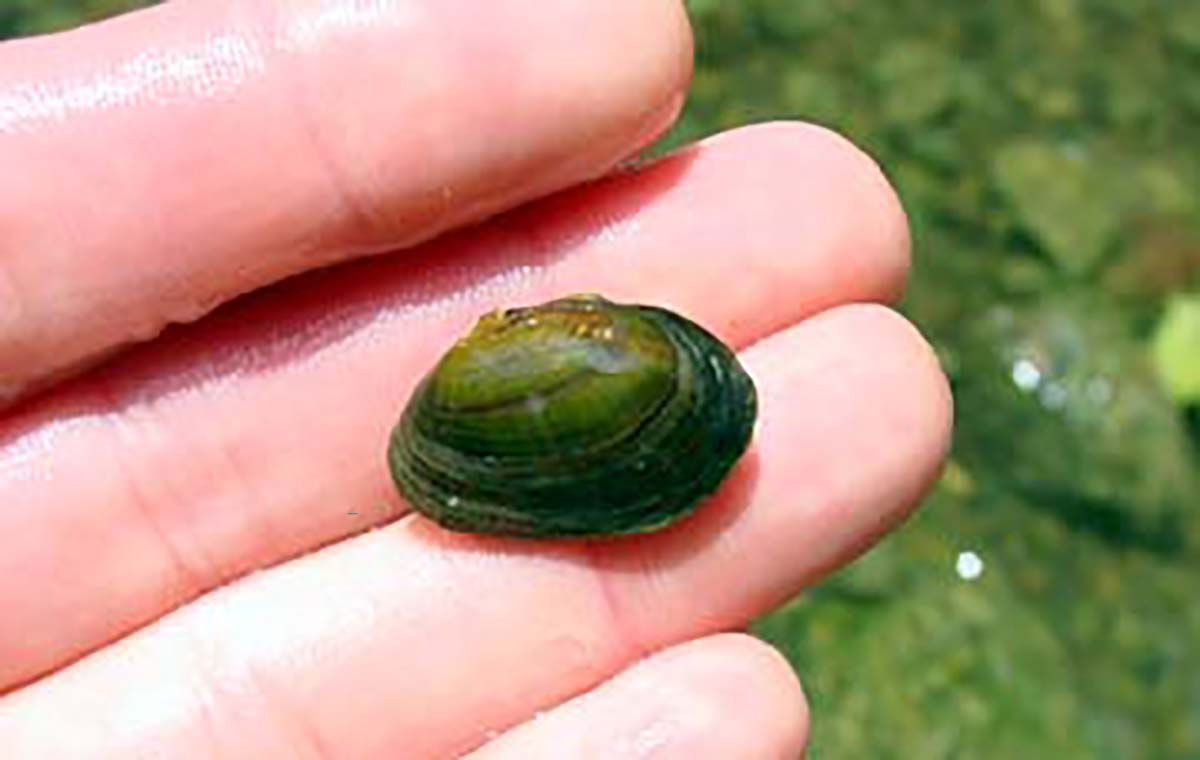

Conservation status
- Endangered (IUCN 3.1)

- Imperiled (NatureServe)

Scientific classification
- Kingdom: Animalia
- Phylum: Mollusca
- Class: Bivalvia
- Order: Unionida
- Family: Unionidae
- Tribe: Lampsilini
- Genus: Paetulunio; Watters, 2018
- Species: P. fabalis

Binomial name
- Paetulunio fabalis (Lea, 1831)

Synonyms
- Villosa fabalis (Lea, 1831)

= Paetulunio =

Species of bivalve

Paetulunio fabalis, the rayed bean, is a species of freshwater mussel in the family Unionidae, the river mussels. It is the only species in the genus Paetulunio, and was formerly classified in Villosa until a 2018 study.

The species name is derived from Latin, with a general meaning of "small crescent bean".

It was first described as Unio fabalis by Isaac Lea in 1831, from a specimen from the Ohio River.

== Distribution ==
This species lives in eastern North America. It is native to the drainages of the Ohio River, the Tennessee River, and Lake Erie and Lake St. Clair.

Currently, it is thought to occur in Michigan, Indiana, Ohio, Pennsylvania, New York, Kentucky, West Virginia, and Ontario. In Canada, it is only known from the Sydenham River, with a small population in the north Thames River. To the south and west, it occurs as far as the Maumee River watershed in Indiana and the Duck River in Tennessee. To the east, it occurs as far as the Elk River in West Virginia and the Allegheny River in Pennsylvania and New York. Shells have been found from the St. Joseph River of Lake Michigan, but it no longer exists in this watershed.

It has been extirpated from Lake Erie, where it once lived in shallow shores and around islands, and the Detroit River, due to invasive zebra and quagga mussels.

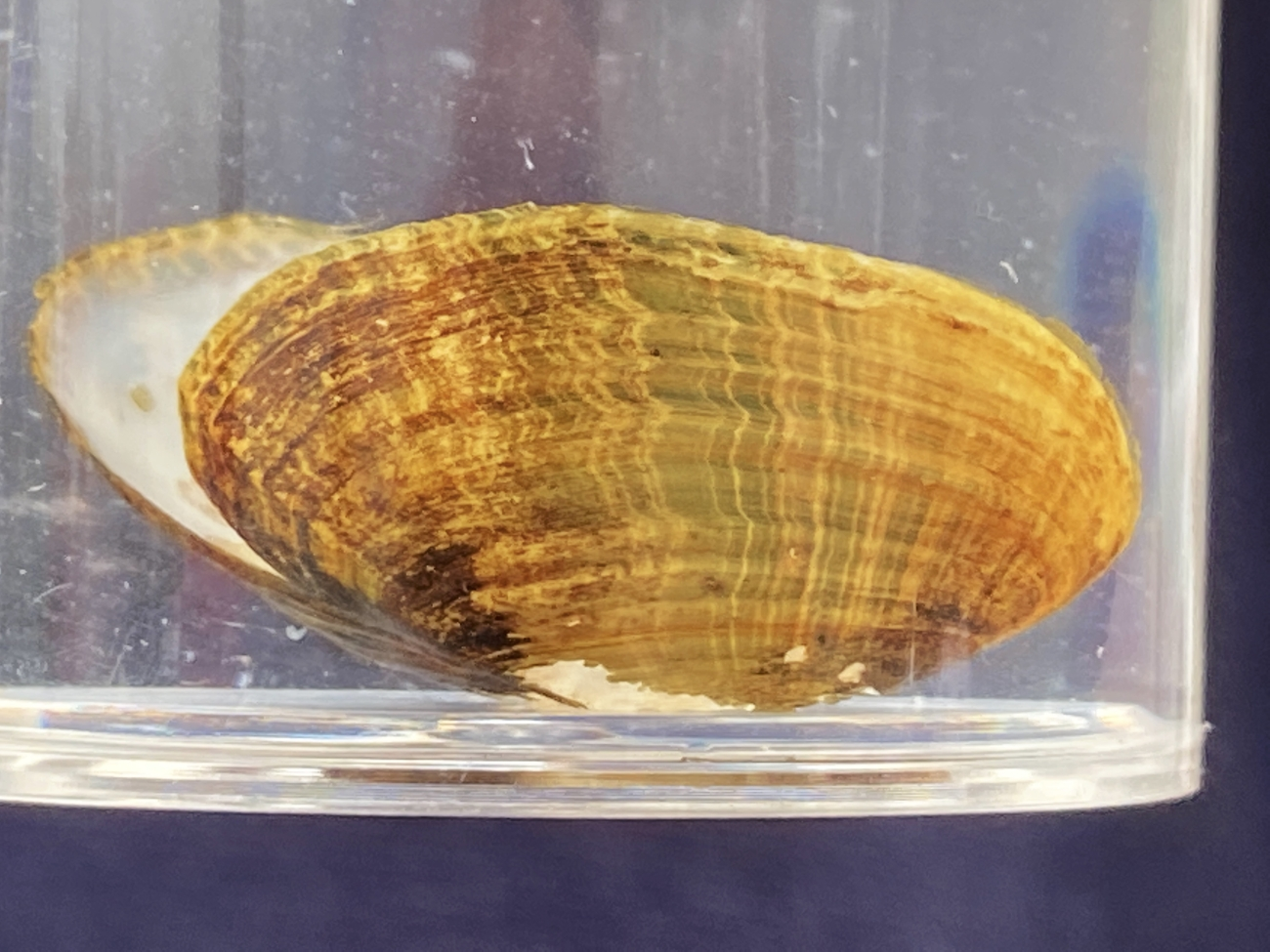
Distinct wavy rays on the shell

== Description ==
The rayed bean is a small mussel that is rarely larger than 3.8 cm (1.5 in) in length. The shell is shiny and green, yellowish-green, or brown, and has many wavy, dark green rays. The rays may be obscured in older animals. The shell is thick and solid. The nacre is silvery-white or bluish and iridescent towards the posterior side. On the inside of the shell, it has unusually heavy teeth (structures along the inner hinge line) for a small mussel.

Females are generally smaller than males, and more inflated.

== Habitat ==
It lives in small rivers and creeks with gravel or sandy riffles, pools, or flats, and sometimes in the shallow areas of lakes. It prefers flowing water in shallow depths and may often be found buried around the roots of vegetation such as water willow and water milfoil. The rayed bean is almost always found buried in the substrate, at depths up to 15cm.

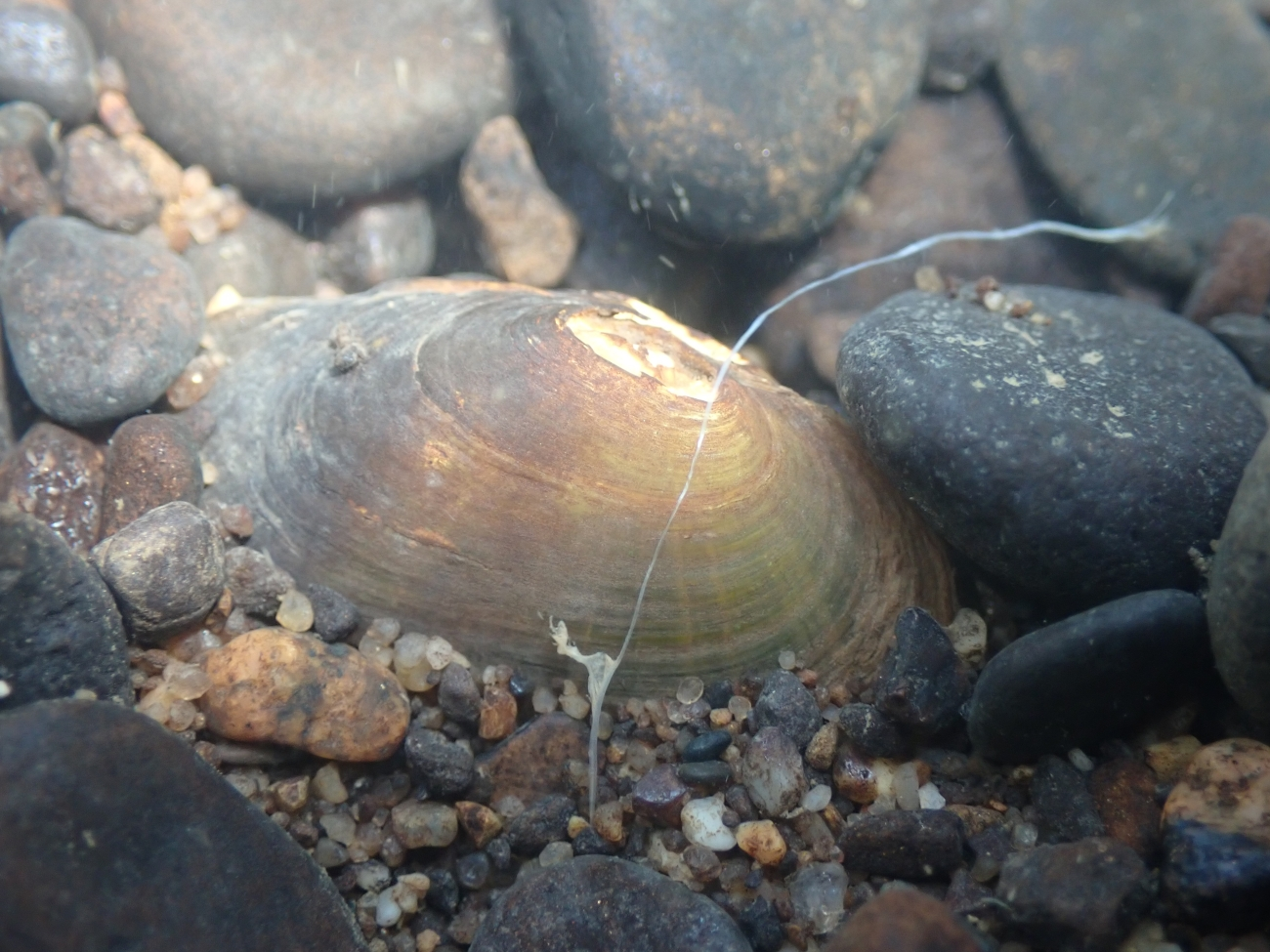
Rayed bean with a byssal thread attached to rock

Both adults and juveniles create byssal threads made of protein to anchor themselves to gravel or other objects in the water. Due to their small size, this adaptation helps them stay in suitable habitat without being swept away by the current.

== Ecology ==
Freshwater mussels in general are filter-feeders that siphon oxygen and food such as phytoplankton and microorganisms from the water. As juveniles they use "foot feeding" to absorb particles through their foot.

During reproduction, males release sperm into the water, which the females take in through their siphon. The female develops the eggs inside her gills. The number of eggs is likely in the thousands. The rayed bean is thought to be a long-term brooder, meaning they hold the developing eggs for several months. Brooding females have been found from May to October. Like most freshwater mussels, the glochidia (larvae) have a parasitic phase where they must attach to a host fish. To attract a host fish, the female rayed bean gapes her shell and exposes her white swollen gills that contain the glochidia. She moves papillae on her mantle in rhythmic, zipping motion. Presumably, like similar unionid mussels, when the fish comes near or nibbles her mantle, she will spurt glochidia into the water so that they can attach to the fish's skin and gills.

The only known host fish for the larval stage are the Tippecanoe darter and the spotted darter. Other darters have been suggested as possible hosts as well, such as greenside darter, rainbow darter, mottled sculpin, or largemouth bass. After spending 1–2 weeks attached to the fish's gills, the larvae finish metamorphosing and drop off as juvenile mussels.

Its lifespan has been estimated at around 20 years.

== As a food source ==
The rayed bean has been found in shell middens at Native American archaeological sites in small percentages. It was not likely preferred food due to its small size.

The species is preyed upon by muskrat, racoon, mink, river otter, striped skunk, feral hogs, hellbender salamander, turtles, aquatic birds, and some fish.

== Threats ==
The main threats to the rayed bean are siltation of rivers, water pollution, and changes in river flow and physical barriers imposed by dams. Invasive dreissenid mussels (zebra and quagga mussels), and the invasive round goby also have a major impact.

=== Habitat loss and alteration ===
In 2012, it was estimated that the rayed bean had been eliminated from 73% of its historical habitat, leaving only highly fragmented populations.

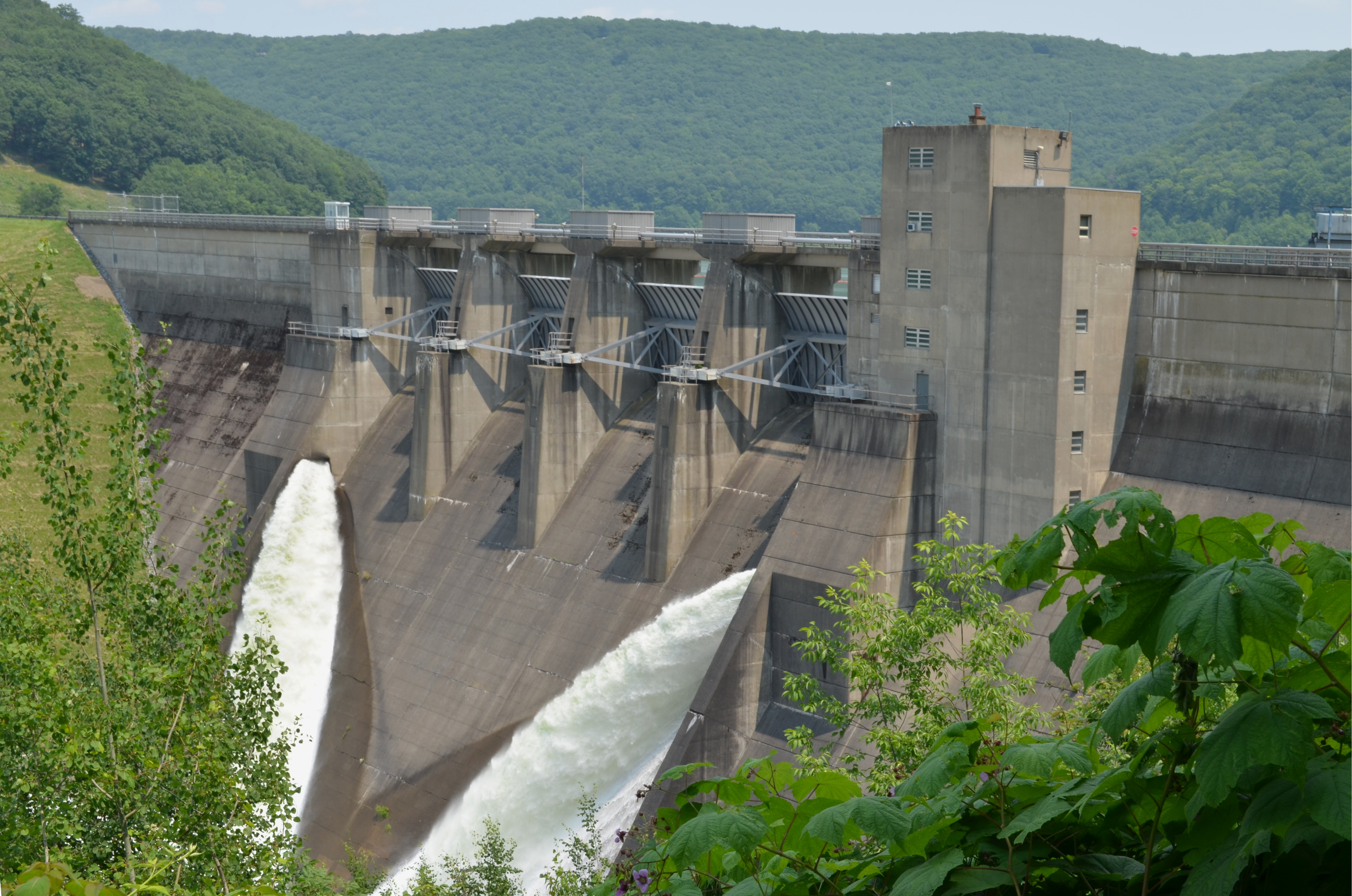
Kinzua Dam on the Allegheny River, Pennsylvania

Dams cause dramatic change to riffle and shoal habitats, change flood patterns and water flow, and cause increased sedimentation. Dams block the free passage of host fish, preventing fish from reaching mussel populations, which is detrimental to mussel reproduction. In Ontario, dams cut off the North Thames population from their historic habitat in the south river.

Navigation channels, dredging, agricultural run-off, and livestock trampling of river edges cause sedimentation and disrupt mussel habitat. In Ontario, siltation from agricultural and forestry practices are the biggest threat to the species. Excessive silt can impact mussels' feeding and respiration and cause suffocation. Much of the rayed bean's river habitat is surrounded by agricultural land (for example, up to 89% of the Maumee River drainage in Ohio). Lack of streamside buffers that separate agriculture and development projects from rivers can cause run-off and pollution.

Interstitial spaces in the substrate are an important part of the rayed bean's habitat because of their burrowing behavior. Large deposits of sedimentation and contaminants in sediment can degrade these spaces.

=== Pollution ===
Chemical contaminants come from industrial and municipal discharge, spills, and agricultural and other run-off. Mussels have been shown to have high sensitivity to pollutants such as ammonia, metals, chlorine, and pesticides, and may affect them even in levels determined "safe" by EPA standards. Nutrients such as nitrogen and phosphorus come from farm and livestock run-off can deplete dissolved oxygen levels. The Upper Thames River has some of the highest phosphorus levels in the region. Pharmaceutical pollution from wastewater is an emerging but relatively unstudied threat and is common in the rayed bean's habitat.

=== Invasive species ===
Dreissenid mussels (zebra and quagga mussels) are invasive freshwater mussels from eastern Europe that have become firmly established in parts of the rayed bean's range. Dreissenid mussels attach themselves to native mussels, reduce food particles in the water, interrupt reproduction, and foul the water with pseudofeces. Zebra mussels are established in the Great Lakes and Ohio River drainages, have eliminated rayed bean populations from Lake Erie and the Detroit River, and have high potential to spread further.

Two introduced fish species, the round goby and the black carp, are aggressive predators of mussels.

=== Population fragmentation ===
Many populations are geographically isolated and have become even more so as dams were constructed. Some are below the effective population size needed to sustain the population and maintain genetic diversity.

=== Localized threats ===
Several localized threats have been identified for certain populations the rayed bean. These include contaminants from coal mining near the Elk River in West Virginia, gravel mining near the Allegheny and Tennessee watersheds, and oil and gas extraction from the Marcellus and Utica Shales. Dreissenid mussels from Fanshawe Lake in Ontario represent a potentially devastating threat to the Thames River population.

== Conservation efforts ==
It has been listed as Endangered in Canada on the List of Wildlife Species at Risk under the Canadian Species at Risk Act since 1999. In 2012, it was listed as Endangered in the United States under the Endangered Species Act, citing a reduction in range and declining, isolated populations. It holds protection at the state and provincial levels in several jurisdictions including Ontario, Michigan, Ohio, and Indiana.

The species' recent success has been mixed. Some new populations have been found since its Endangered listing in 2012, and the Allegheny River holds one of the largest current populations and appears to be increasing. A study found robust populations in locations in Ohio and New York in 2024.

However, Fish and Wildlife surveys have found it likely extirpated in other locations. Several recent bridges and infrastructure projects have been detrimental to this mussel, and a 2017 cleanup project for a decades-old petroleum spill near the city of Olean, New York affected thousands of rayed bean that had to be relocated from that area of the Allegheny.

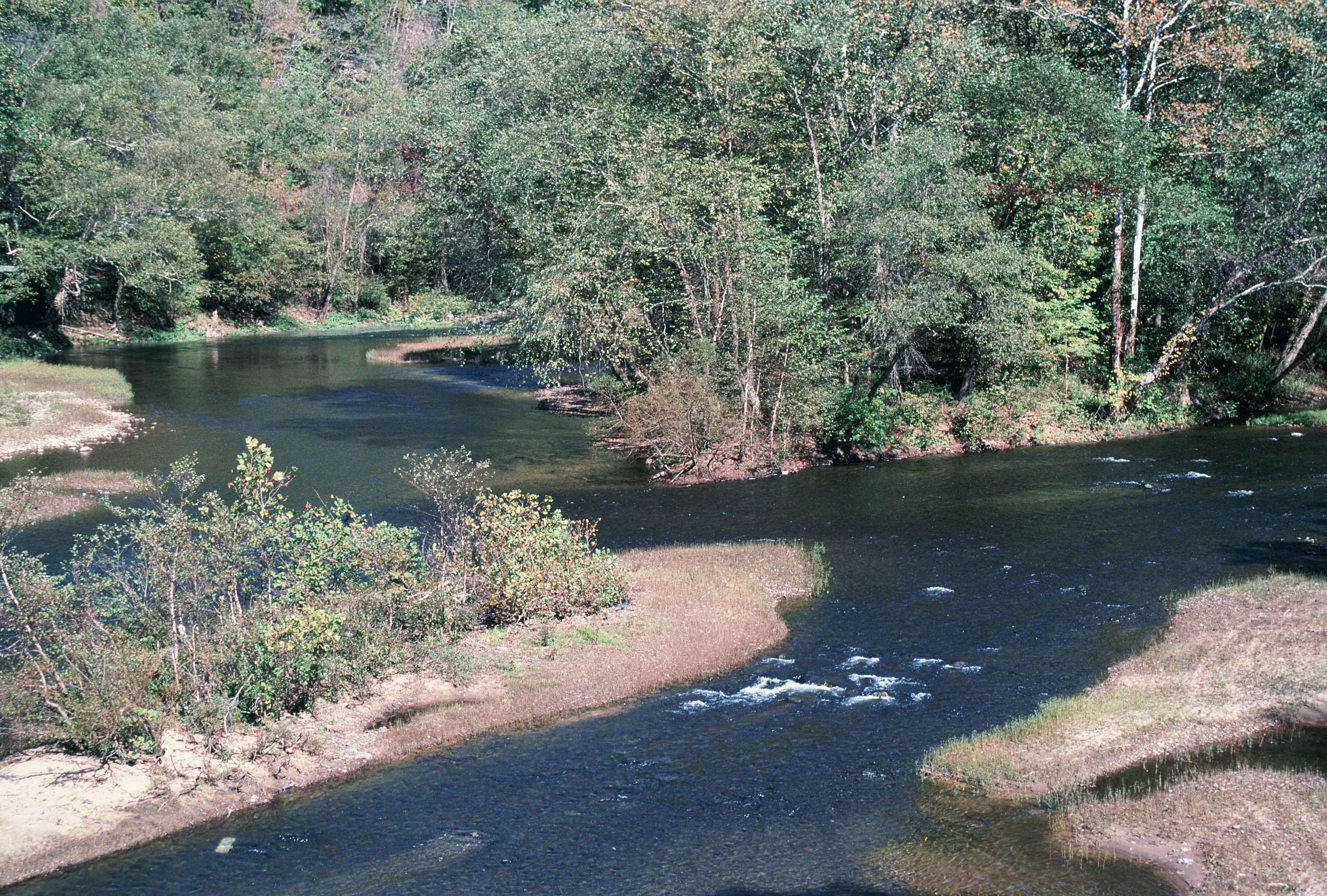
The Elk River in West Virginia

There have been several reintroduction efforts in different areas. The status of a 2006–07 translocation of mussels to the Elk River is uncertain, while a relocation to the Duck River in 2009 initially appeared successful. In 2020, over 5,000 rayed bean that had been salvaged from the Olean petroleum cleanup were transferred to the Green River and Licking River in Kentucky, areas where the species had previously been extirpated.

Since the life history of the rayed bean has been insufficiently studied, captive breeding is not yet possible.
