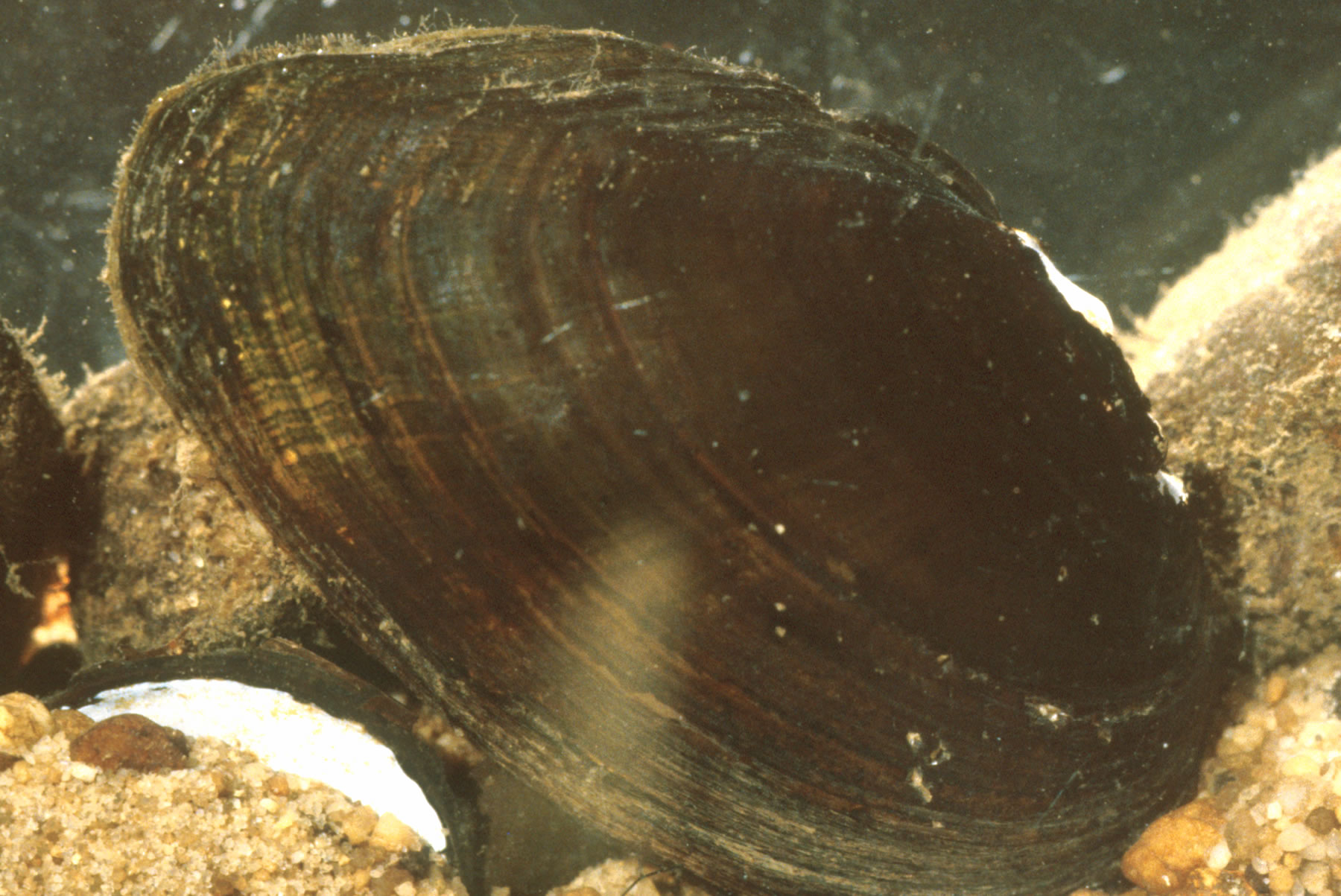

Conservation status
- Critically Endangered (IUCN 2.3)

- Endangered (ESA)

Scientific classification
- Kingdom: Animalia
- Phylum: Mollusca
- Class: Bivalvia
- Order: Unionida
- Family: Unionidae
- Genus: Villosa
- Species: V. perpurpurea

Binomial name
- Villosa perpurpurea (Lea, 1861)

= Villosa perpurpurea =

Species of bivalve

Villosa perpurpurea, the purple bean, is a species of freshwater mussel, an aquatic bivalve mollusk in the family Unionidae, the river mussels.

This species is endemic to the United States. Its natural habitat is rivers. It is threatened by habitat loss.

The purple bean is mainly found in northeastern Tennessee and southwestern Virginia. It inhabits small headwater streams to medium-sized rivers. It is also found in moderate to fast-flowing riffles with sand, gravel, and cobble substrates and rarely it is found in deep pools or slack water. It may occur in areas adjacent to water such as willow beds and under flat rocks. The purple bean is a filter-feeder which clings to the bottom. There is no exact number for population but it is estimated to be in the hundreds with the largest population found in the upper Clinch River and Indian Creek. This animal is declining. There was a chemical spill in the Clinch River in 1998 that killed at least 52 specimens. A current threat to the purple bean is a change in turbidity, increased suspended solids, and pesticides. A big impact to the purple bean's habitat is localized coal mining. There have been five mine tailings pond spills from 1995 to 1999, one of which resulted in a major fish kill. Chemicals that are found in coal fines such as polycyclic aromatic compounds (PAHs) are known to be toxic to mussels and fishes.
