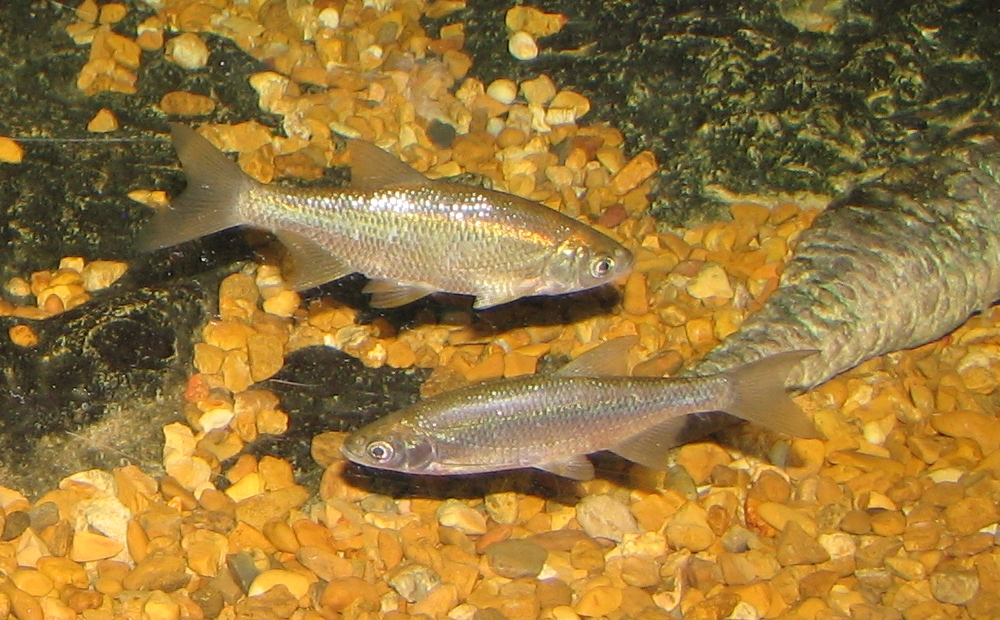
- Striped shiners (Luxilus chrysocephalus)

Scientific classification
- Kingdom: Animalia
- Phylum: Chordata
- Class: Actinopterygii
- Order: Cypriniformes
- Family: Leuciscidae
- Subfamily: Pogonichthyinae
- Genus: Luxilus; Rafinesque, 1820

Type species
- Luxilus chrysocephalus Rafinesque, 1820

Species
- See text

Synonyms
- Plargyrus Rafinesque, 1820; Hypsolepis Agassiz, 1854; Coccogenia Cockerell & Callaway 1909

= Luxilus =

Genus of fishes

Luxilus is a genus of freshwater ray-finned fishes belonging to the family Leuciscidae, the shiners, daces and minnows. The species in this genus are found in North America. They are commonly known as highscale shiners.

== Species ==
Luxilus contains the following valid species:

- Luxilus albeolus (D. S. Jordan, 1889) (white shiner)
- Luxilus cardinalis (Mayden, 1988) (cardinal shiner)
- Luxilus cerasinus (Cope, 1868) (crescent shiner)
- Luxilus chrysocephalus Rafinesque, 1820 (striped shiner)
- Luxilus cornutus (Mitchill, 1817) (common shiner)
- Luxilus pilsbryi (Fowler, 1904) (duskystripe shiner)
- Luxilus zonatus (Putnam, 1863) (bleeding shiner)
