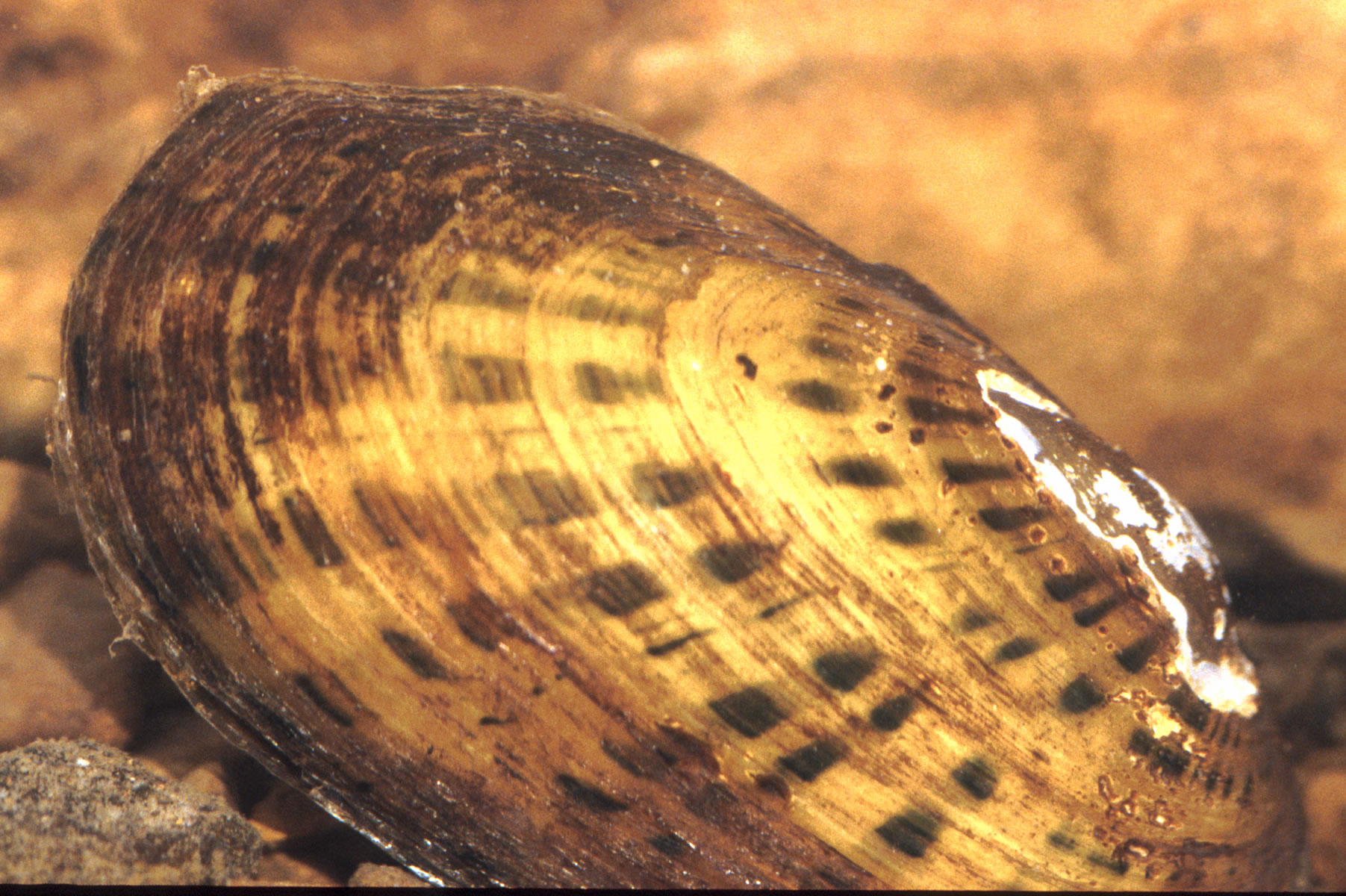

Conservation status
- Least Concern (IUCN 3.1)

Scientific classification
- Kingdom: Animalia
- Phylum: Mollusca
- Class: Bivalvia
- Order: Unionida
- Family: Unionidae
- Genus: Villosa
- Species: V. taeniata

Binomial name
- Villosa taeniata (Conrad, 1834)

= Villosa taeniata =

Species of bivalve

Villosa taeniata, the painted creekshell, is a species of freshwater mussel, an aquatic bivalve mollusk in the family Unionidae.

The glochidia of this species are hosted by the rock bass (Ambloplites rupestris).
