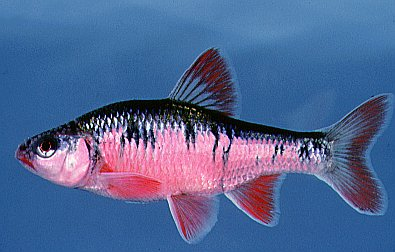

Conservation status
- Least Concern (IUCN 3.1)

Scientific classification
- Kingdom: Animalia
- Phylum: Chordata
- Class: Actinopterygii
- Order: Cypriniformes
- Family: Leuciscidae
- Genus: Luxilus
- Species: L. cerasinus

Binomial name
- Luxilus cerasinus (Cope, 1868)

Synonyms
- Hypsilepis cornutus cerasinus Cope. 1868; Notropis cerasinus (Cope, 1868)

= Crescent shiner =

Species of fish

The crescent shiner (Luxilus cerasinus) is a species of freshwater ray-finned fish belonging to the family Leuciscidae, the shiners, daces and minnows. It occurs in the James, Roanoke, Chowan, New, and the extreme upper Cape Fear River drainages in Virginia and North Carolina. Its preferred habitat is rocky and sandy pools and runs of headwaters, creeks and small rivers.

In North Carolina

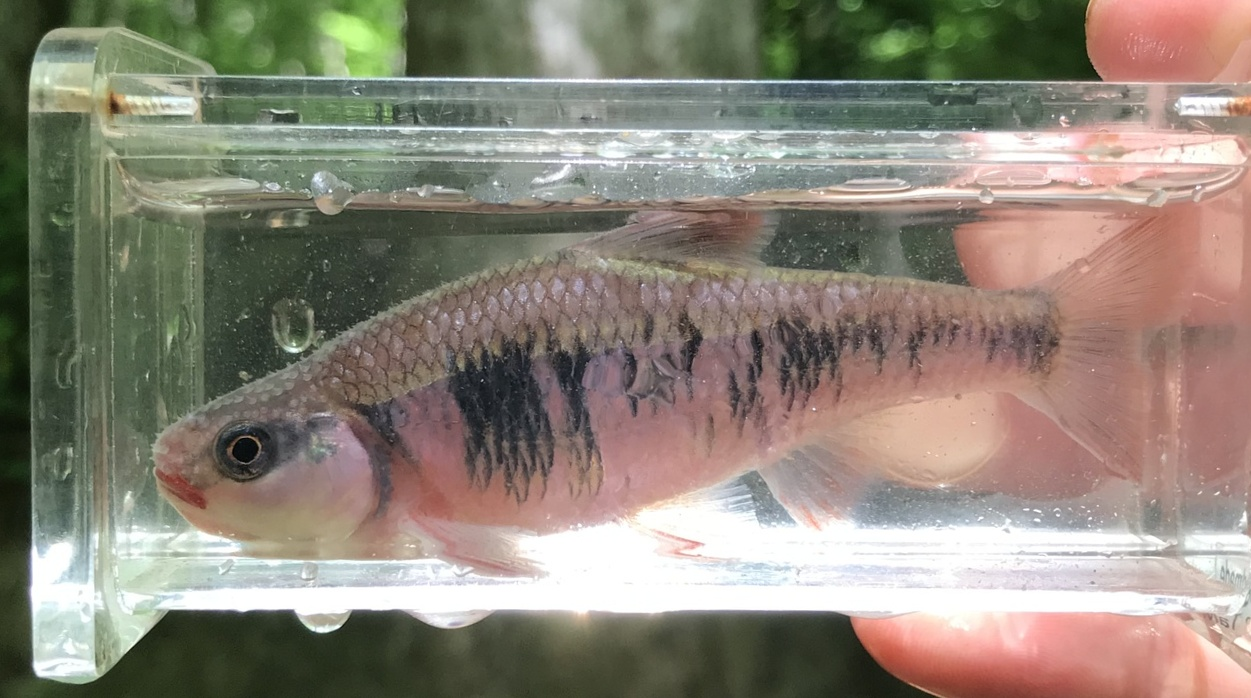

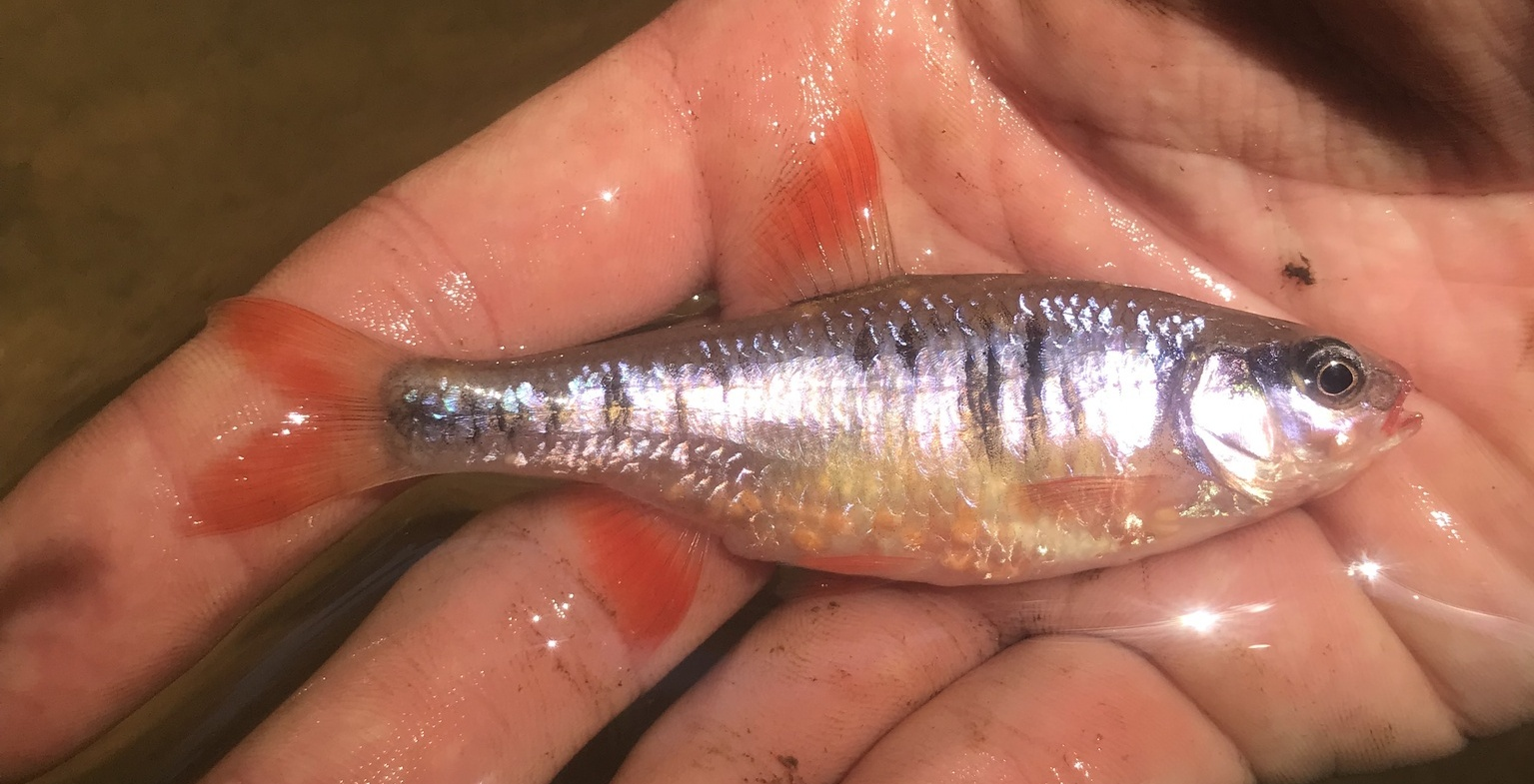
