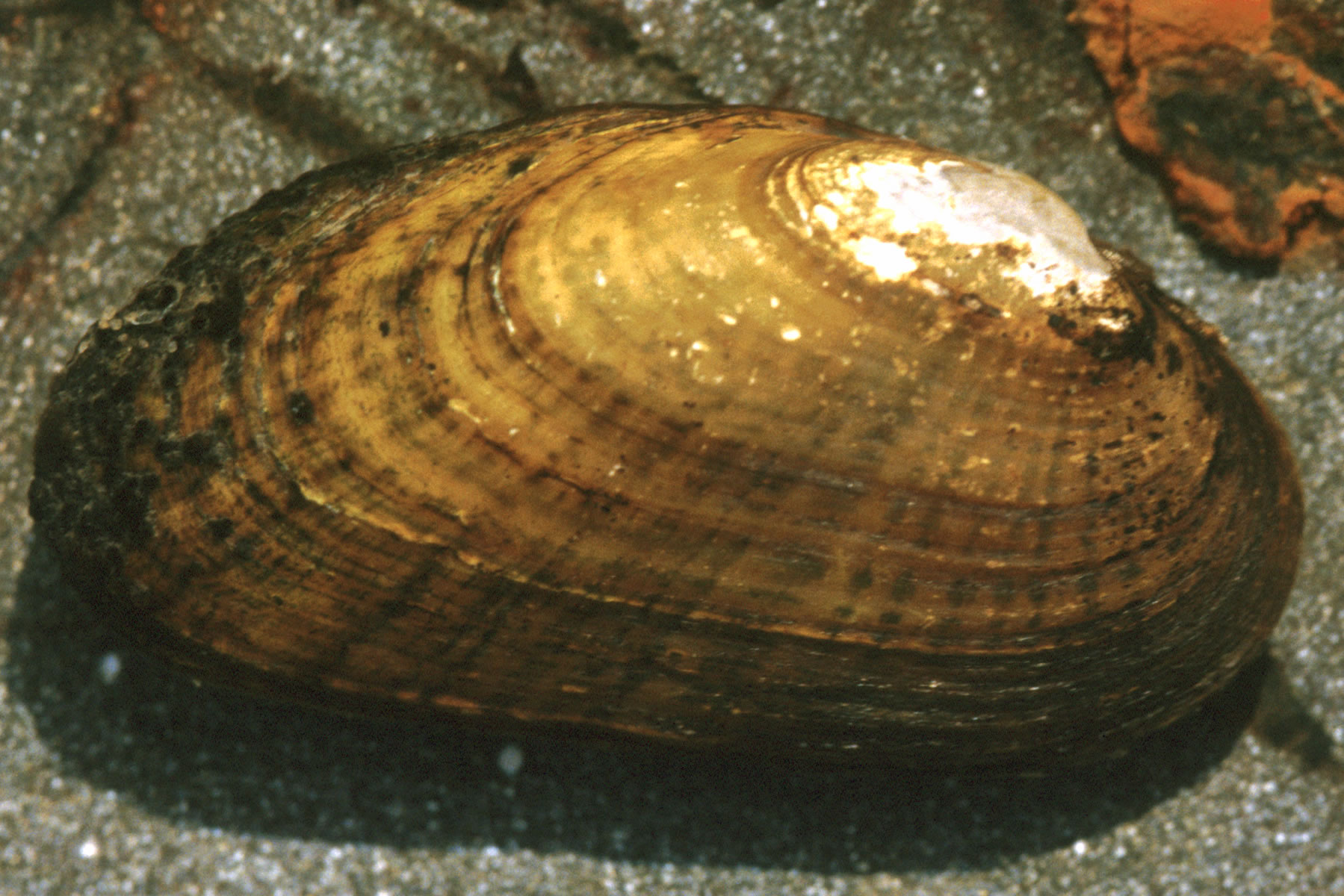

Conservation status
- Apparently Secure (NatureServe)

Scientific classification
- Kingdom: Animalia
- Phylum: Mollusca
- Class: Bivalvia
- Order: Unionida
- Family: Unionidae
- Genus: Villosa
- Species: V. iris

Binomial name
- Villosa iris (Lea, 1829)

Synonyms
- Unio iris Lea, 1829

= Villosa iris =

Species of bivalve

Villosa iris, the rainbow mussel or rainbow-shell, is a species of freshwater mussel, an aquatic bivalve mollusk in the family Unionidae, the river mussels. In 2018, Watters proposed to move the species into a new genus, Cambarunio.

== Reproduction ==
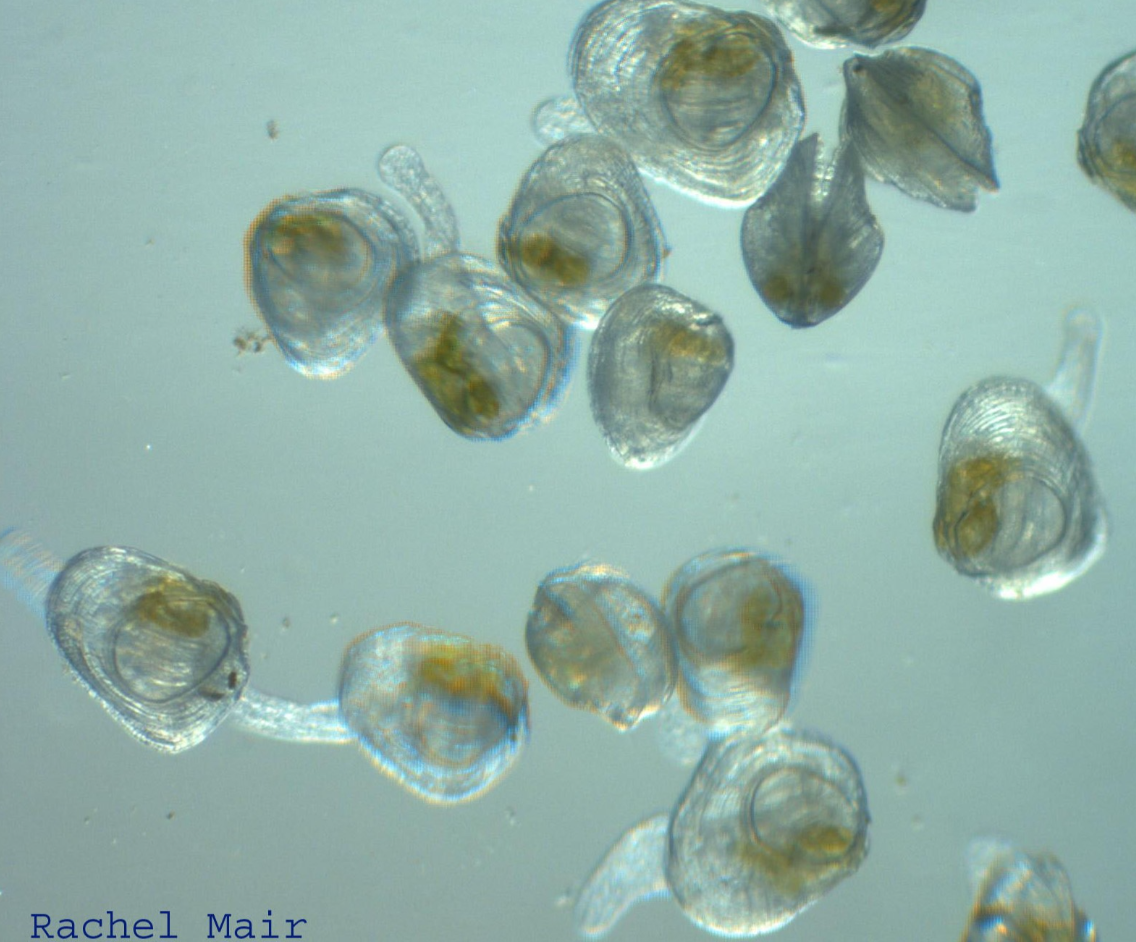
Newly metamorphosed rainbow mussels (Villosa iris).

All Unionidae are known to use the gills, fins, or skin of a host fish for nutrients during the larval glochidia stage. Female villosa iris attract host fish by imitating a crayfish. Elongate papillae on the mantle margin resemble crayfish antennae, legs, and eyes. They also mimic crayfish behavior, moving the papillae independently like legs, and use "tail tucking" motions. Juvenile mussels bury themselves in the sediment just below its surface and feed on interstitial bacteria and bacteria-sized particles including algae.

== Distribution ==
This species is widely distributed throughout the St. Lawrence, upper Mississippi, Ohio, Tennessee, and Cumberland River drainage basins.

== Conservation status ==
Villosa iris is the focus of conservation concern in areas like Ontario, Illinois, West Virginia, Pennsylvania, and Wisconsin. In Canada, V. iris is listed as a species of Special Concern by the Committee on the Status of Endangered Wildlife in Canada (COSEWIC) and under the Species at Risk Act, having been downgraded to this status in 2019 after its initial listing as Endangered in 2013. In the United States, the Government of Wisconsin lists it as endangered.
