= Schistura fowleriana =

Scientific classification
- Kingdom: Animalia
- Phylum: Chordata
- Class: Actinopterygii
- Order: Cypriniformes
- Family: Nemacheilidae
- Genus: Schistura
- Species: S. fowleriana

Binomial name
- Schistura fowleriana (Smith, 1945)

Synonyms
- Noemacheilus fowlerianus Smith, 1945

Species of fish

Schistura fowleriana is a species of stone loach from the genus Schistura. It is found in Thailand. It is considered by some authorities to be a synonym of Schistura sexcauda.
