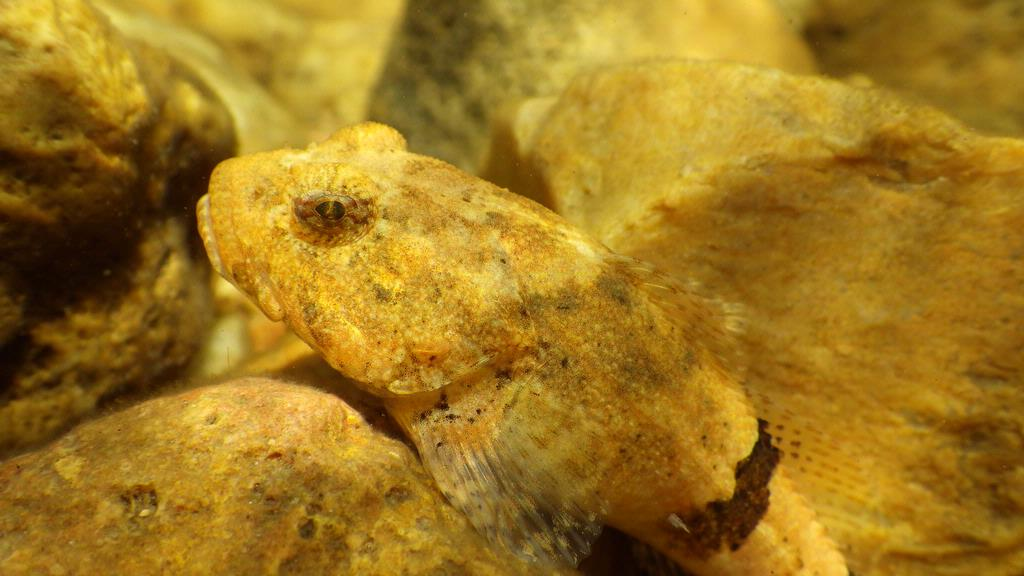

Conservation status
- Least Concern (IUCN 3.1)

Scientific classification
- Kingdom: Animalia
- Phylum: Chordata
- Class: Actinopterygii
- Division: Teleostei
- Order: Perciformes
- Suborder: Cottoidei
- Family: Cottidae
- Genus: Cottus
- Species: C. carolinae

Binomial name
- Cottus carolinae T. N. Gill, 1861

= Banded sculpin =

Species of fish

The banded sculpin (Cottus carolinae) is a freshwater fish dwelling mostly in small to moderate sized streams in areas of swift current. Young and juvenile C. carolinae can mainly be found in pools, riffles, and other shallow habitats while adults tend to prefer deeper waters. C. carolinae primarily eats insects and insect larvae, but their large mouths enable them to eat prey nearly as large as themselves, including other sculpin. To prevent predation, including by other fish, the color and pattern of the sculpin tends to match its environment. Most Cottus carolinae are mottled brown with dark vertical banding and usually reach about three inches in length. They have a broad head which rather quickly narrows into a slim body, giving them the appearance of a tadpole reaching adulthood.

Cottus carolinae has proven to be useful as a representative species for the effects of mining related impacts on fishing communities since it has been proven that their density is negatively correlated with higher metal concentrations from mining. In other areas around the Cumberland Basin, as a benthic fish, the C. carolinae is in danger of increased siltation by area farming. Though the sculpin faces these threats, they are not yet on the list of endangered species.

== Distribution ==
Cottus carolinae is a freshwater species dwelling within the United States. The wide-ranging species occurs in eastern North America west of the Appalachians and south of the Ohio River Valley. The species lives as far south as the mountain streams of Alabama, but prefers the cooler streams of the mid to northern United States.

== Ecology ==
=== Habitat ===
Cottus carolinae usually inhabits streams and rivers with cool, running water. They are a benthic species and prefer stream beds made of sand bedrock, stones, or boulders. C. carolinae partake in size-specific habitat segregation, with the majority of adults in the pools of streams and rivers with the young-of-the-year inhabiting the riffles. Most streams inhabited by the species are less than two meters deep with a velocity between 0.1 and 0.7 meters per second with a standard deviation of + or - .2 meters per second.

The species is sometimes found in caves, but such individuals generally resemble the aboveground population and may only be occasional visitors. An apparently cave-adapted individual that lacked pigmentation but had normal eye-size has been reported from a cave in West Virginia. Other better-known cave-adapted (in both pigmentation and eyes) populations from Missouri were formerly included in this species, but recognized as a separate species, the grotto sculpin (C. specus), in 2013.

The banded sculpin is intolerant to habitat changes, and has experienced some limitations due to the effects of pollution. The largest pollutant threat to Cottus carolinae habitat is siltation of rivers and streams. Additionally, water impurities such as mining-derived metals in areas of Missouri have posed a high enough threat to populations that numbers have dwindled in those areas.

=== Diet and competition ===
Cottus carolinae is primarily a nocturnal ambush predators and subsists largely off of a diet of insects and insect larvae, though they are opportunistic feeders and have been known to feed on one another, as well as salamanders, other fish, plants, and detritus. A large portion of their diet consists of mayflies, followed closely by fly larvae. Because of their flexible feeding habits, diet of C. carolinae varies with habitat, and they consume invertebrates whose own presence is determined by the relative availability of food sources such as algae and detritus.

The greatest risk of predation for larger C. carolinae is posed by piscivorous mammals, reptiles, and birds, which lead to the habitat shift from shallow riffles to deeper pools into adulthood.

Their largest concern with respect to competition is for rock shelters with other species such as crayfish. Individual fish have an average home range of 47 square meters.

=== Life history ===
Mating and nesting for C. carolinae begins in early spring. Spawning is triggered by a spike in water temperature of about fifty degrees Fahrenheit. Though the temperature spike does not have to be maintained for continued spawning, it is necessary for spawning activation. In preparation for the spawning period, some males will darken in coloration, though this is less common in Cottus carolinae and more common in other Cottus species', such as Cottus bairdii.

The spawning period for Cottus carolinae is short, lasting less than two weeks. Spawning occurs underneath stones or other objects and eggs are deposited in large clumps. Fecundity averages 465 ova per female. Once spawning is complete, males guard the nests until the eggs hatch. Some very attentive males groom out bad eggs while eggs in the clutches of less attentive males are sometimes preyed upon by opportunistic bacteria and fungi. Most male Cottus carolinae begin reproduction at the age of two years or beyond, with females beginning to reproduce slightly sooner. The lifespan of Cottus carolinae averages four years.

== Current management ==
The United States Environmental Protection Agency has Cottus carolinae listed as intolerant to habitat destruction and intermediately intolerant to pollution. As a species that feeds and reproduces benthically, C. carolinae is more vulnerable to stream degradation that non-benthic species. Because of this pollution sensitive nature, the species is often used as an indicator of stream health. Studies have shown that populations of C. carolinae decrease in the presence of silts, pollution, and disturbance and it has been shown in the past that C. carolinae densities are negatively correlated with water metal concentrations. Though there is not a huge threat to the species from invasive species, excess trout introduction in some areas has reduced species numbers.

Currently, Cottus carolinae is not listed as threatened or endangered by the United States Fish and Wildlife Services, nor is it on the IUCN Red List. Though some studies have been done to determine the effects of siltation and mining-related metal concentrations, there are currently no large conservation efforts in place for Cottus carolinae due to its absence from any threatened or endangered species lists. In the future, human impact can be reduced by managing the effects of farming on siltation and devising a way to prevent run-off water containing mining-related metals from flowing into streams and rivers.
