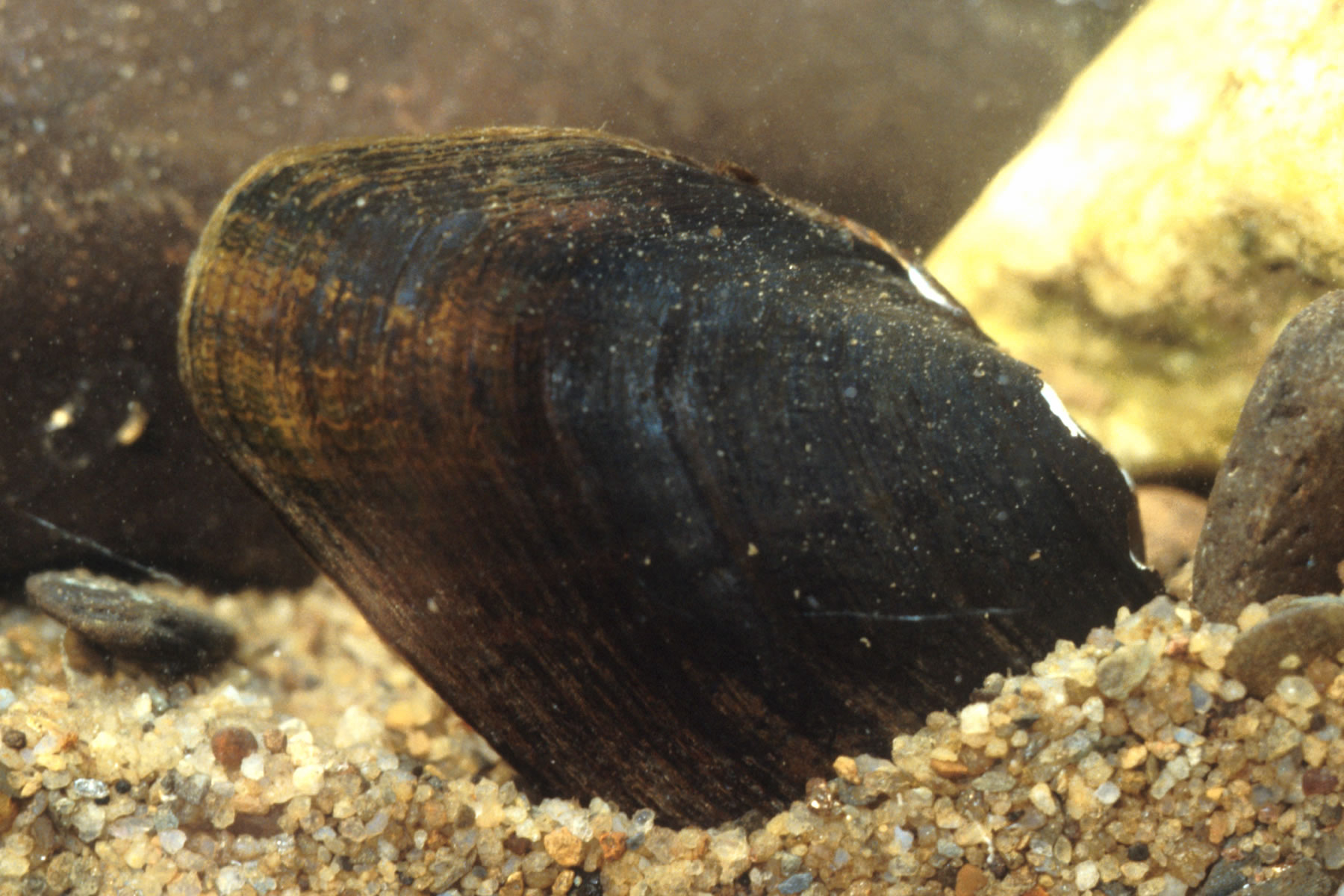
- Villosa trabalis

Scientific classification
- Kingdom: Animalia
- Phylum: Mollusca
- Class: Bivalvia
- Order: Unionida
- Family: Unionidae
- Tribe: Lampsilini
- Genus: Villosa; Frierson, 1927

= Villosa =

Genus of bivalves

Villosa is a genus of freshwater mussels, aquatic bivalve molluscs in the family Unionidae.

== Species ==
Species within the genus Villosa:

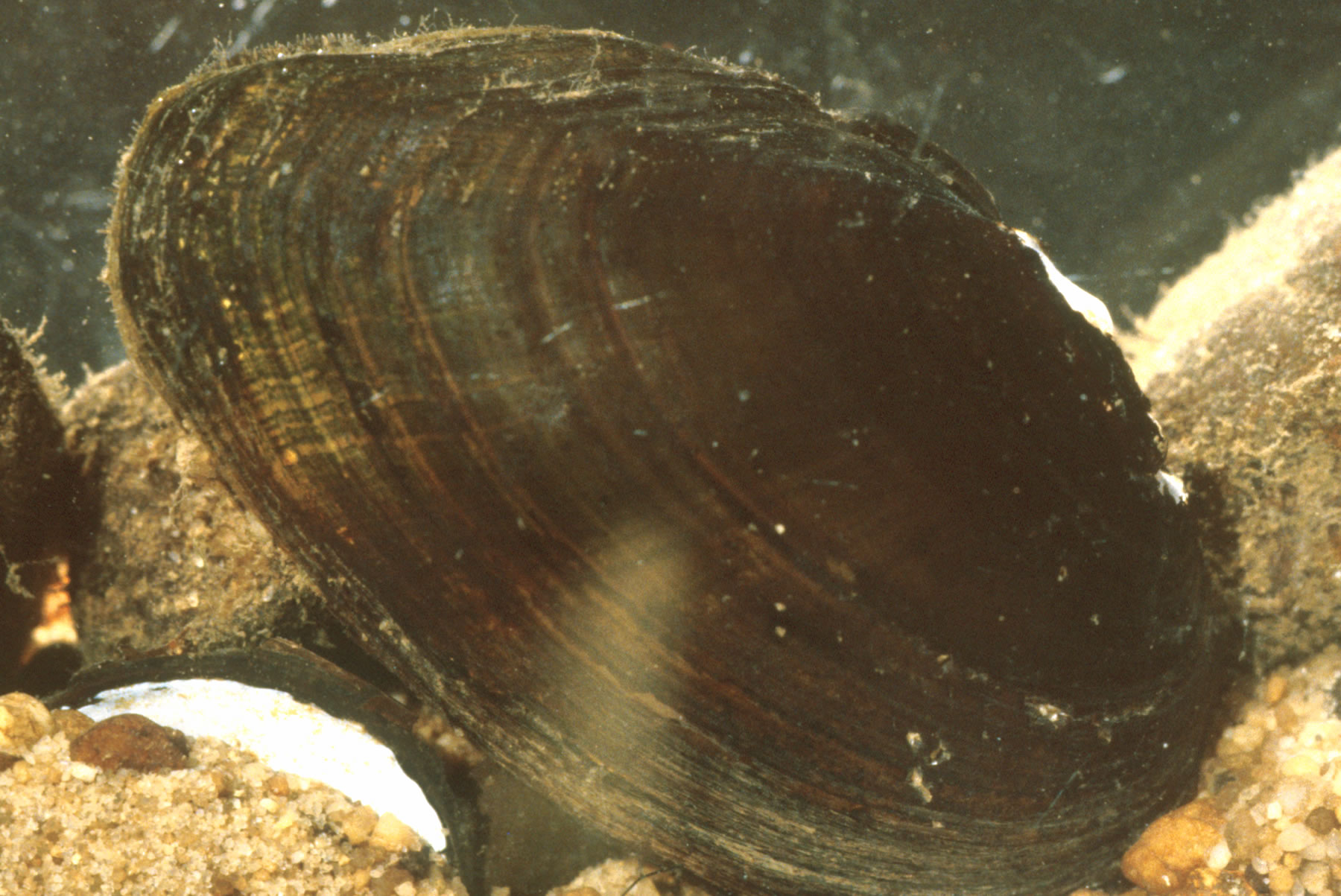
Villosa perpurpurea

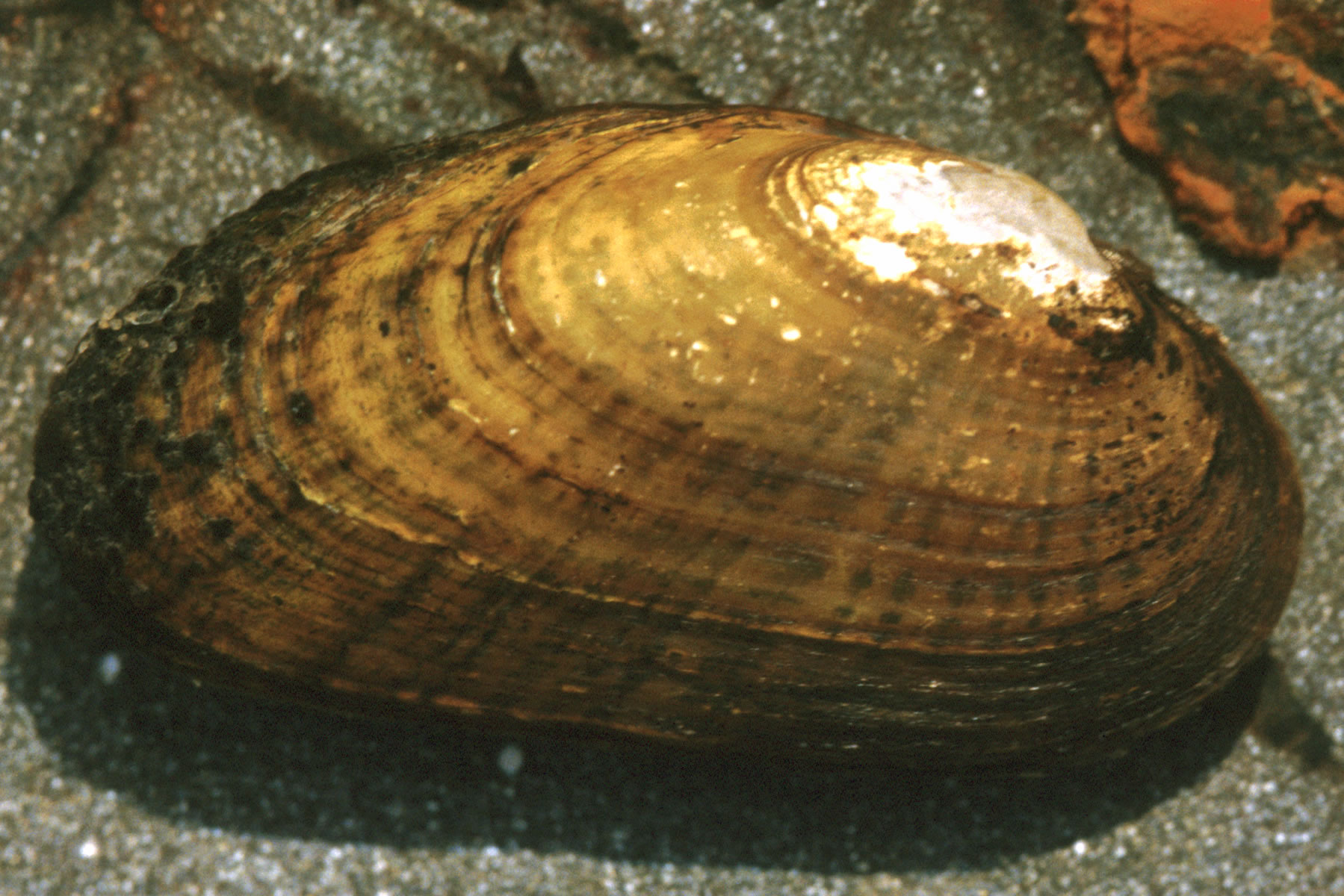
Villosa iris

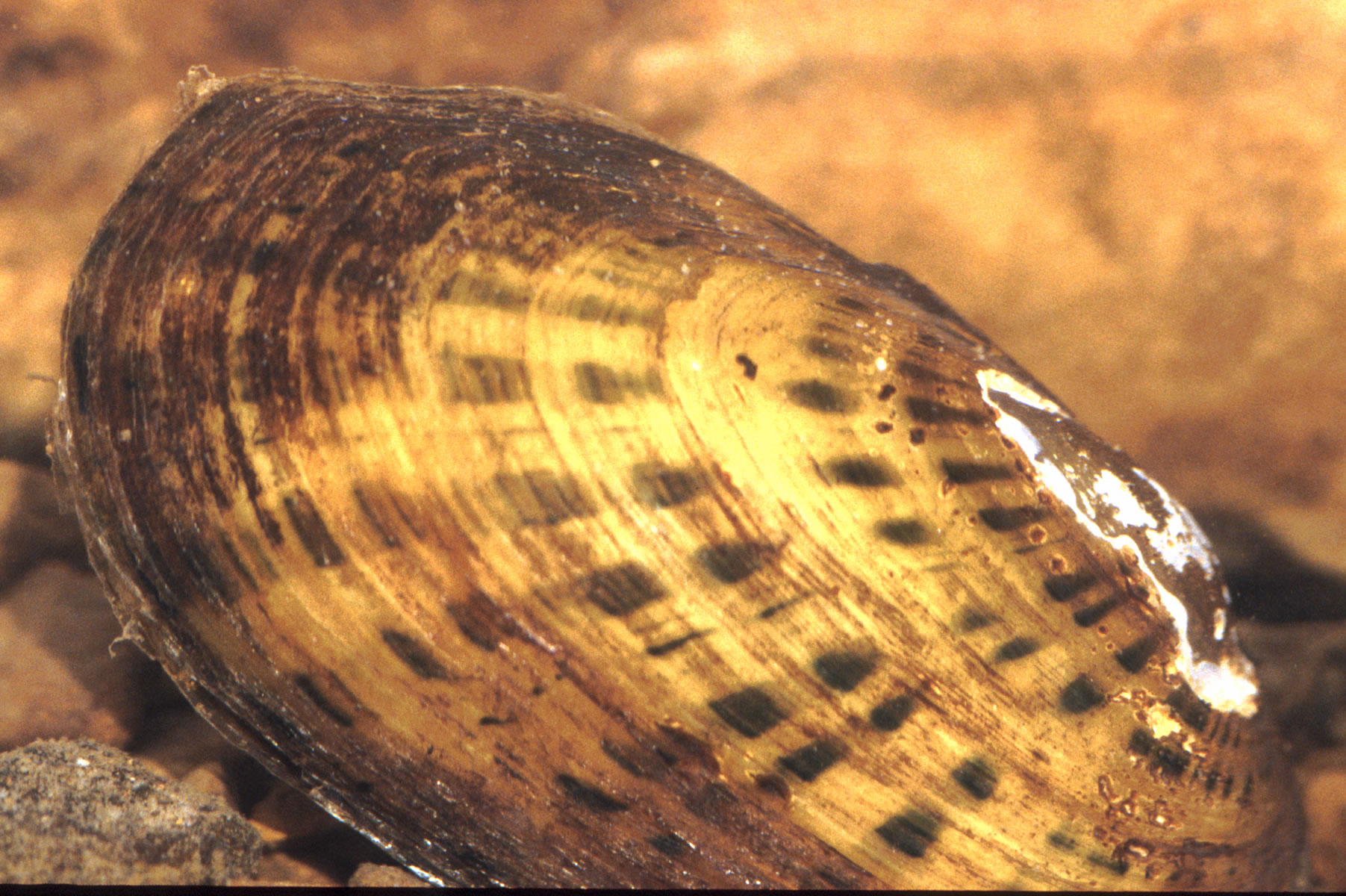
Villosa taeniata

- Villosa amygdala
- Villosa choctawensis - Choctaw bean
- Villosa constricta
- Villosa delumbis
- Villosa fabalis - Rayed bean
- Villosa iris - Rainbow mussel
- Villosa lienosa
- Villosa nebulosa
- Villosa ortmanni
- Villosa perpurpurea - Purple bean
- Villosa taeniata - Painted creekshell
- Villosa trabalis - Cumberland bean pearly mussel
- Villosa umbrans
- Villosa vanuxemensis
- Villosa vaughaniana - Carolina creekshell
- Villosa vibex
- Villosa villosa
