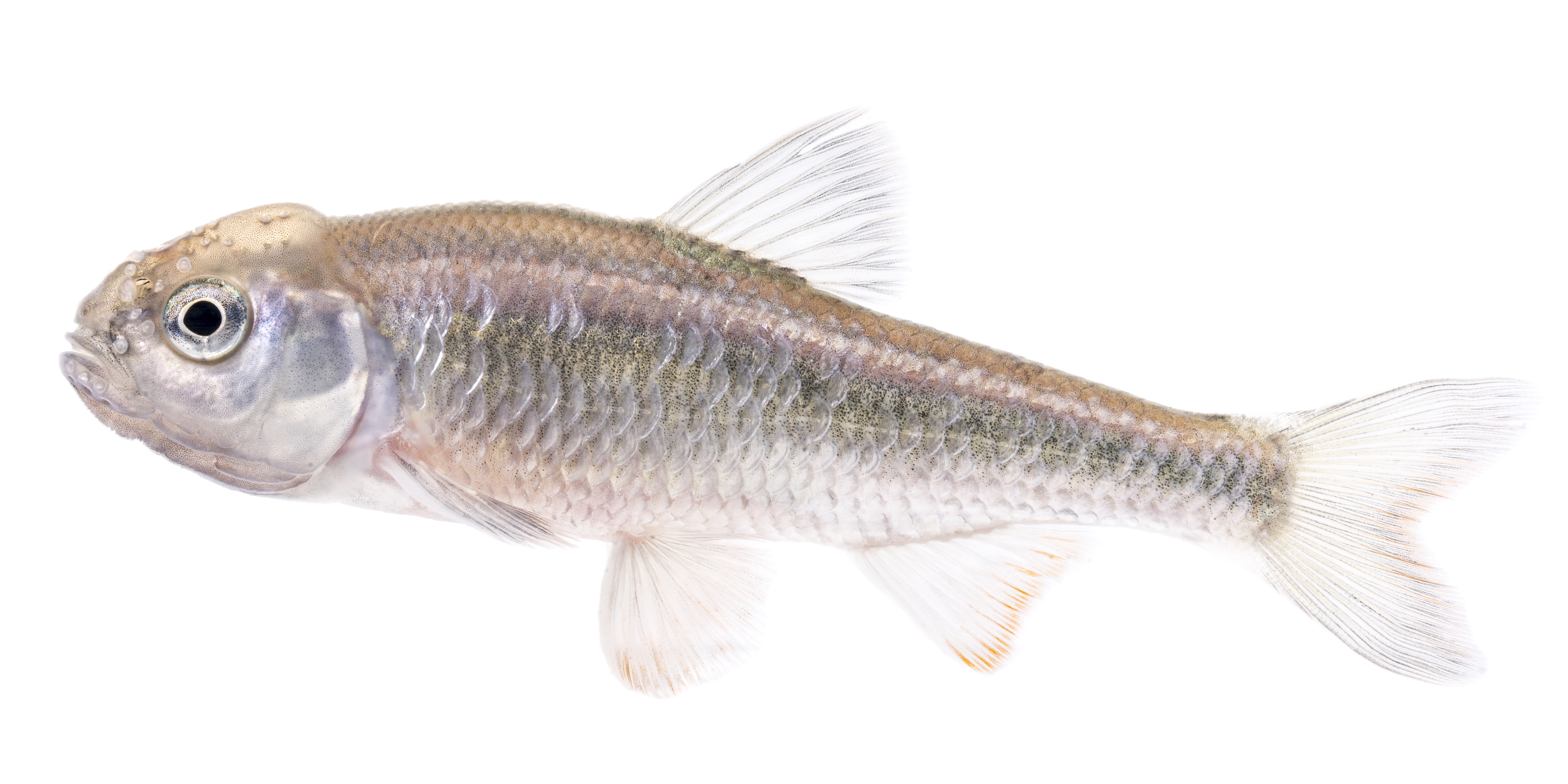
- Breeding male

Conservation status
- Least Concern (IUCN 3.1)

Scientific classification
- Kingdom: Animalia
- Phylum: Chordata
- Class: Actinopterygii
- Order: Cypriniformes
- Family: Leuciscidae
- Subfamily: Pogonichthyinae
- Genus: Luxilus
- Species: L. cornutus

Binomial name
- Luxilus cornutus (Mitchill, 1817)

Synonyms
- List: Cyprinus cornutus Mitchill, 1817; Notropis cornutus (Mitchill, 1817); Cyprinus megalops Rafinesque, 1817; Cyprinus melanurus Rafinesque, 1817; Rutilus compressus Rafinesque, 1820; Cyprinus haematopterus Rafinesque, 1820; Cyprinus trivittatus Rafinesque, 1820; Leuciscus vittatus DeKay, 1842; Argyreus rubripinnis Heckel, 1843; Leuciscus spirlingulus Valenciennes, 1844; Leuciscus frontalis Agassiz, 1850; Leuciscus gracilis Agassiz, 1850; Plargyrus bowmani Girard, 1856; Plargyrus argentatus Girard, 1856; Notropis universitatis Evermann & Cockerell, 1909

= Common shiner =

Species of fish

The common shiner (Luxilus cornutus) is a species of freshwater ray-finned fish belonging to the family Leuciscidae, the shiners, daces and minnows. This fish is found in North America. It ranges in length between 4 and 6 inches (10 and 15 cm), although they can reach lengths of up to 8 inches (20 cm).

== Description ==
The common shiner is silvery colored (sometimes bronze) and has an "olive back with a dark dorsal stripe."

The common shiner is a freshwater fish found in North America. Adults inhabit rocky pools in small to medium rivers. They can live to be approximately 6 years old.

They are considered sexually mature by 7.4 centimetres (2.9 in). Breeding males have a pinkish tint over most of their body and small bumps or tubercles on their head.

In comparison with Notropis, the common shiner's head, eyes, and mouth are large.

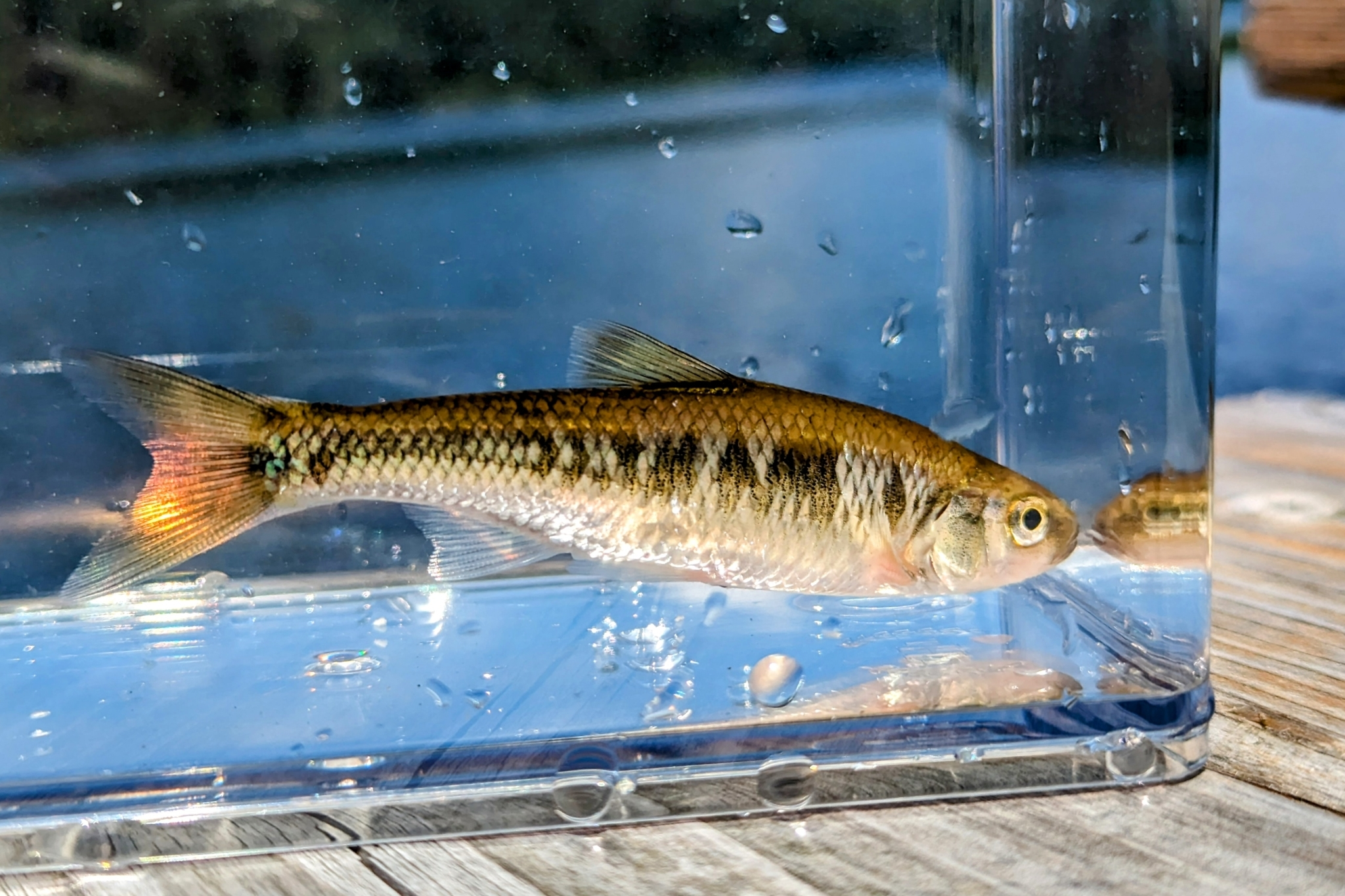
In Quebec

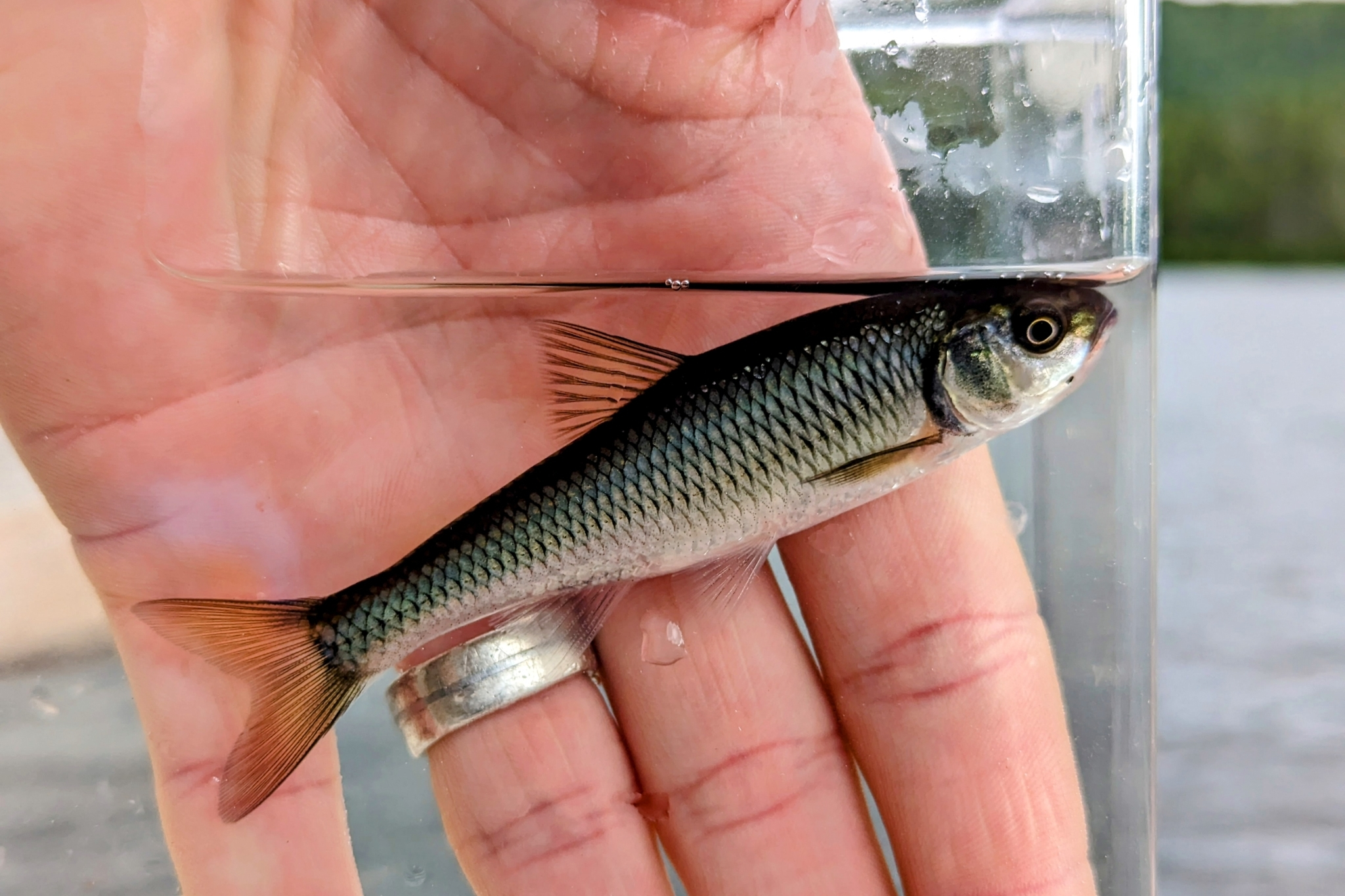
In Quebec

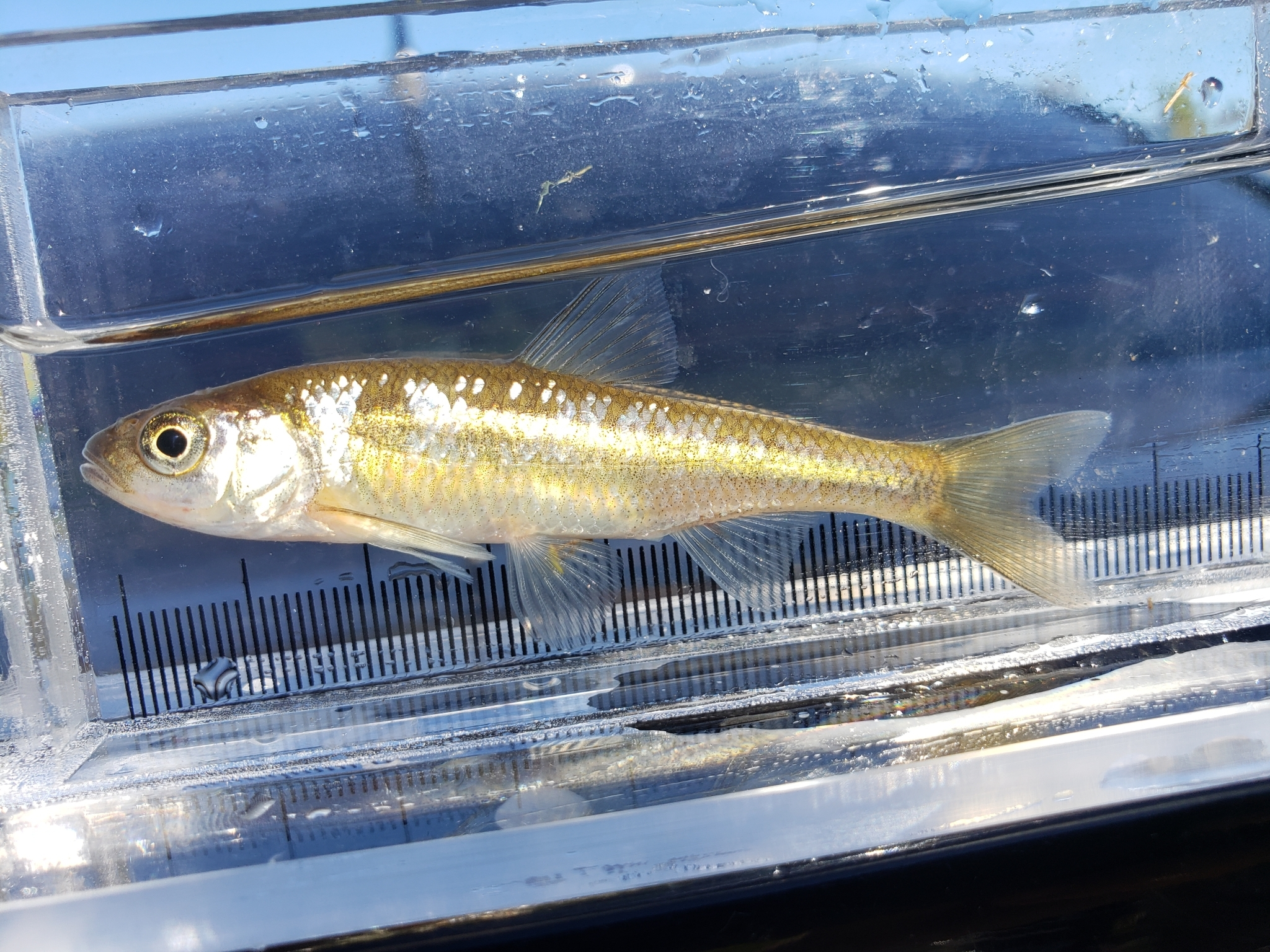
In Ontario

== Life history ==
The common shiner can be found in cool clear creeks and small to medium rivers, usually in the faster pools near riffles and in the shallow littoral of ponds and lakes. They usually concentrate on pools. Its preferred water temperature is 21.9 °C (71.4 °F).

The common shiner reaches sexual maturity by 1–2 years of age, and produces between 400 and 4000 eggs per year. Common shiners spawn in spring between May and June, at temperatures of 16–26 °C (61–79 °F). Common shiners often spawn over the nest of a creek chub, river chub, or fallfish, although some males will make their own small nests. Gravel in riffles is also possible. Spawning males are territorial and will often engage in fights with other males. Once the eggs are ready the male guards the nesting site.

Common shiners are known to hybridize with other shiner species.

Common shiners live for about 4–6 years.

== Diet ==
The common shiner eats "terrestrial and aquatic insects, vegetation, and other fishes."

== Predators ==
Predators of the common shiner include fish (such as the smallmouth bass and chain pickerel) and birds (i.e. mergansers and kingfishers).
