= Duskystripe shiner =

Conservation status
- Least Concern (IUCN 3.1)

Scientific classification
- Kingdom: Animalia
- Phylum: Chordata
- Class: Actinopterygii
- Order: Cypriniformes
- Family: Leuciscidae
- Genus: Luxilus
- Species: L. pilsbryi

Binomial name
- Luxilus pilsbryi (Fowler, 1904)

Synonyms
- Notropis pilsbryi Fowler, 1904

Species of fish

The duskystripe shiner (Luxilus pilsbryi) is a species of freshwater ray-finned fish belonging to the family Leuciscidae, the shiners, daces and minnows. It occurs in tributaries of the White and Little Red rivers of Missouri and Arkansas. Its preferred habitat is rocky and sandy pools and runs of headwaters, creeks and small rivers.
