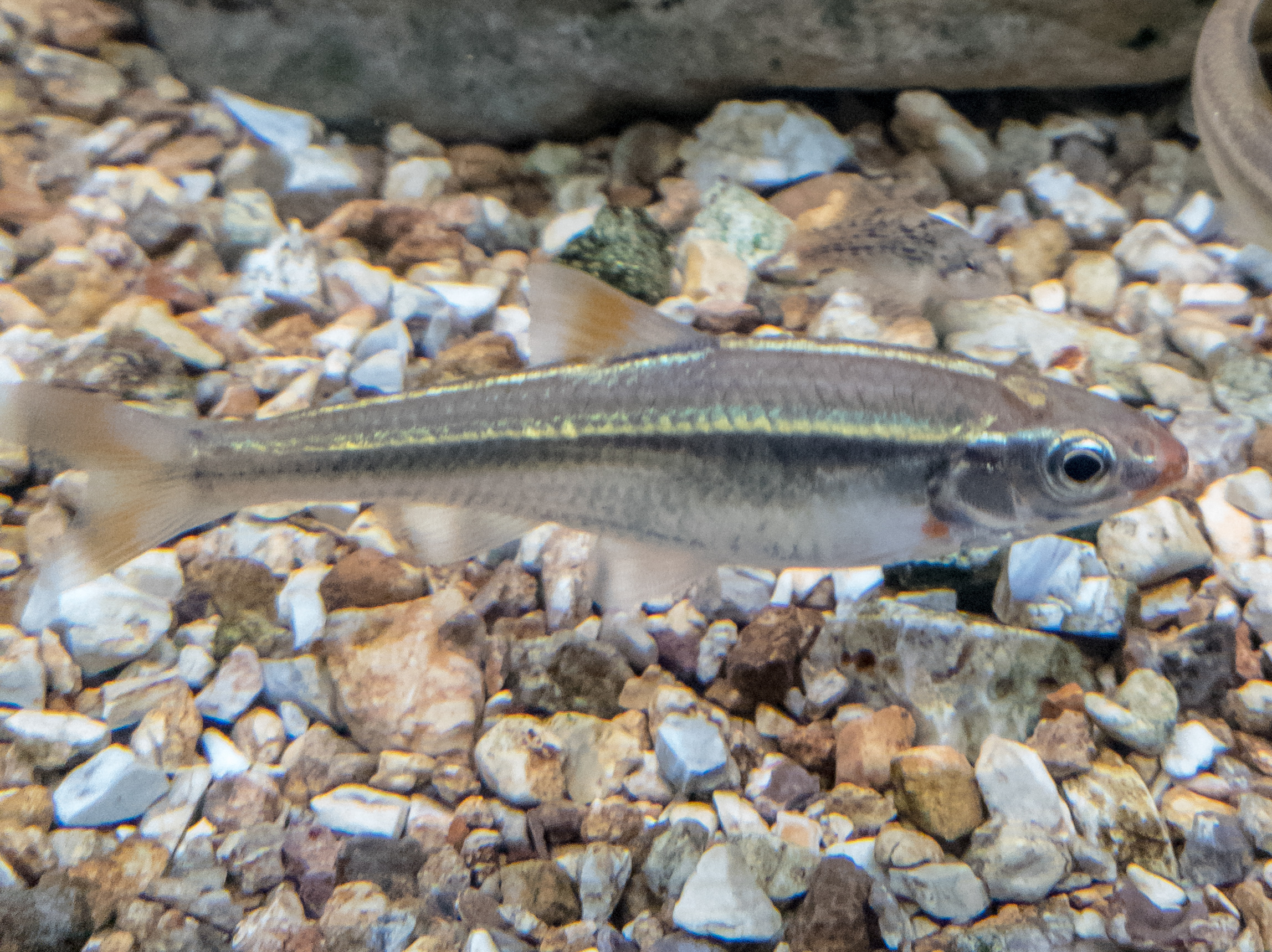

Conservation status
- Least Concern (IUCN 3.1)

- Secure (NatureServe)

Scientific classification
- Kingdom: Animalia
- Phylum: Chordata
- Class: Actinopterygii
- Division: Teleostei
- Order: Cypriniformes
- Family: Leuciscidae
- Genus: Luxilus
- Species: L. zonatus

Binomial name
- Luxilus zonatus (Putnam, 1863)
- Native range of the Bleeding shiner

Synonyms
- Alburnus zonatus Putnam, 1863; Notropis zonatus (Putnam, 1863)

= Bleeding shiner =

Species of fish

The bleeding shiner (Luxilus zonatus) is a species of freshwater ray-finned fish belonging to the family Leuciscidae, the shiners, daces and minnows. It occurs in tributaries of Ozark-draining tributaries of the Missouri, and Mississippi rivers in southern Missouri and northeastern Arkansas. Its preferred habitat is rocky and sandy pools and runs of headwaters, creeks and small rivers.

== Taxonomy ==
Class: Actinopterygii, Order: Cypriniformes, Family: Leuciscidae, Genus: Luxilus, Species: L. zonatus.

The bleeding shiner was originally classified as Alburnus zonatus by Louis Agassiz in a paper published by F. W. Putnam in 1863. Formerly placed to be in the genus Notropis, but removed and added to the genus Luxilus in 1989. Originally the now distinct species of L. zonatus and N. pilsbryi were considered to be synonymous, but after carefully observing the morphological evidence they were added to the Luxilus genus.

== Description ==
The bleeding shiner has an olive brown back with a broad dark stripe along its midline. It has metallic sides and has two black stripes that are separated with a golden stripe. One of these black strips extends to the tip of the snout, while another less obvious black stripe parallels it. The gill opening has a crescent-bar shape and the fish has a silvery white underside. A key difference between this fish and similar minnows is the stripe on the side of the bleeding shiner abruptly narrows directly after the operculum, then widens again down the length of the body to the caudal fin. This fish holds many similarities with L. pilsbryi, but is distinguishable with a few characteristics. L. zonatus has 9 anal rays, 7 gill rakers, 38-43 lateral line scales, and 26 circumferential scales. The origin of the dorsal fin is closer to the tip of the snout than the base of the caudal. The bleeding shiner has a slightly compressed body with relatively large fins for its body size.

Breeding males have bright red markings on their head, body, and fins, and the rest of their markings appear darker.

The bleeding shiner has an average total length of about 4 in (10 cm) and has a maximum total length of 4.75 in (12.1 cm).

== Distribution and habitat ==
The Bleeding Shiner is endemic to Missouri and Arkansas where it is restricted to the Ozark Plateau of Missouri and northeast Arkansas. Bleeding shiner inhabits Ozark-draining tributaries of the Missouri River and the St. Francis, Black, Little, and Meramec Rivers.

Bleeding shiners inhabit temperate climate regions.

Bleeding shiners prefer clear, gravel-bottomed streams and rivers. They have (very rarely) been found in streams with beds of mud, however. They are a demersal fish, they prefer to live close to the bed of the rivers and steams they inhabit. The young tend to inhabit waters that are quieter and flow more gently than the adult shiners.

== Diet ==
The bleeding shiner feeds upon insects and small invertebrates that can be found upon the water's surface or that are being carried by the current. Bleeding shiners have terminal oblique mouths that allow for them to easily eat food from the surface of the water.

It is thought that the bleeding shiner searches for food primarily by sight because of its large eyes.

== Behaviors ==
=== Reproduction ===
Spawning usually occurs over gravel nests and pits that have been made by other fish, namely those of other minnows. Anywhere from a few to a hundred gather in these locations while spawning. Spawning in Missouri occurs from late April to early July, but hits a peak in late May and June. During breeding season, the males present with breeding tubercles that are largest on the head, but also present on the fins and the front of the fish's body.

Bleeding shiners are oviparous, meaning that the eggs are laid by the mother and then unattended afterwards.

=== Schooling behavior ===
Bleeding shiners are found in communities, in the midwater. They swim together in schools along with other types of minnows for protection and safety. The bleeding shiner prefers to reside in slow flowing streams and rivers that are less than 8 inches (203 mm) deep.

== Life history ==
Bleeding shiners rarely live through three summers. The lifespan of this fish is three years.

== Human interest ==
They are not dangerous to humans. Can be used as bait fish for catching larger, carnivorous sport fish. Since the bleeding shiner has vibrant red fins during breeding season they are commonly used in freshwater aquariums.

== Conservation ==
Trends over the last three generations (10 years) indicates that the population may be slowly declining. This is uncertain, however. It is abundant throughout its range.

Bleeding shiners have been known to invade some areas, such as the Clear Creek system.
