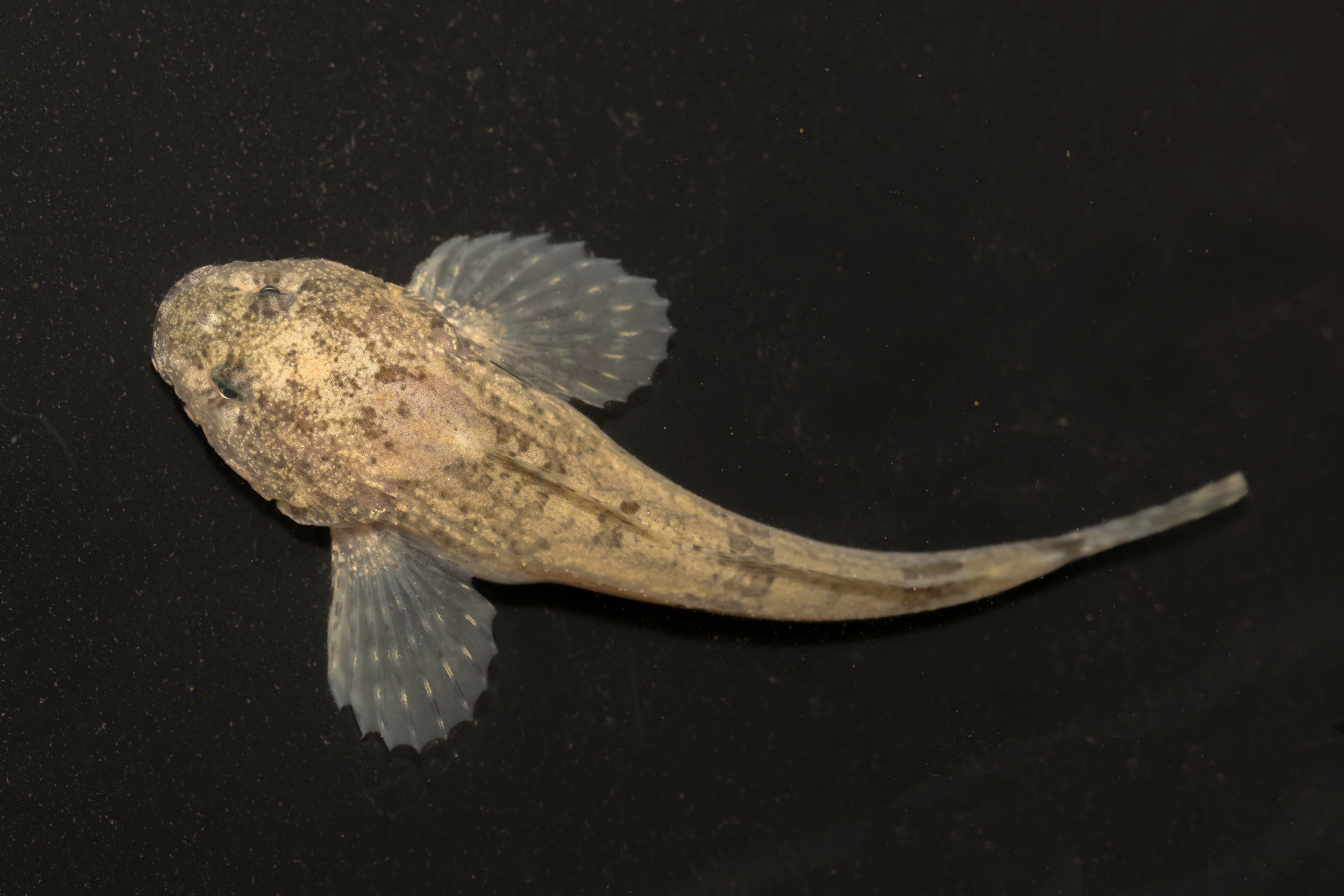

Conservation status
- Endangered (ESA)

Scientific classification
- Kingdom: Animalia
- Phylum: Chordata
- Class: Actinopterygii
- Order: Perciformes
- Suborder: Cottoidei
- Family: Cottidae
- Genus: Cottus
- Species: C. specus

Binomial name
- Cottus specus G. L. Adams & Burr, 2013

= Grotto sculpin =

Species of fish

The grotto sculpin (Cottus specus) is a species of freshwater ray-finned fish belonging to the family Cottidae, the typical sculpins. It is found in the United States where it only inhabits the Bois Brule drainage (although not recorded from the main stream itself) in Perry County of southeastern Missouri. It reaches a maximum standard length of 10.3 cm (4.1 in). This cavefish lives in underground streams and their resurgences. It was formerly confused with the more widespread C. carolinae, but can be separated by (among others) its smaller eyes and various degrees of reduced pigmentation. It is one of only three known cases of troglomorphism in the sculpin family, the others also involving U.S. Cottus (C. bairdi—cognatus species complex in Pennsylvania, and C. carolinae in West Virginia).
