= Riffle =

Shallow landform in a flowing channel

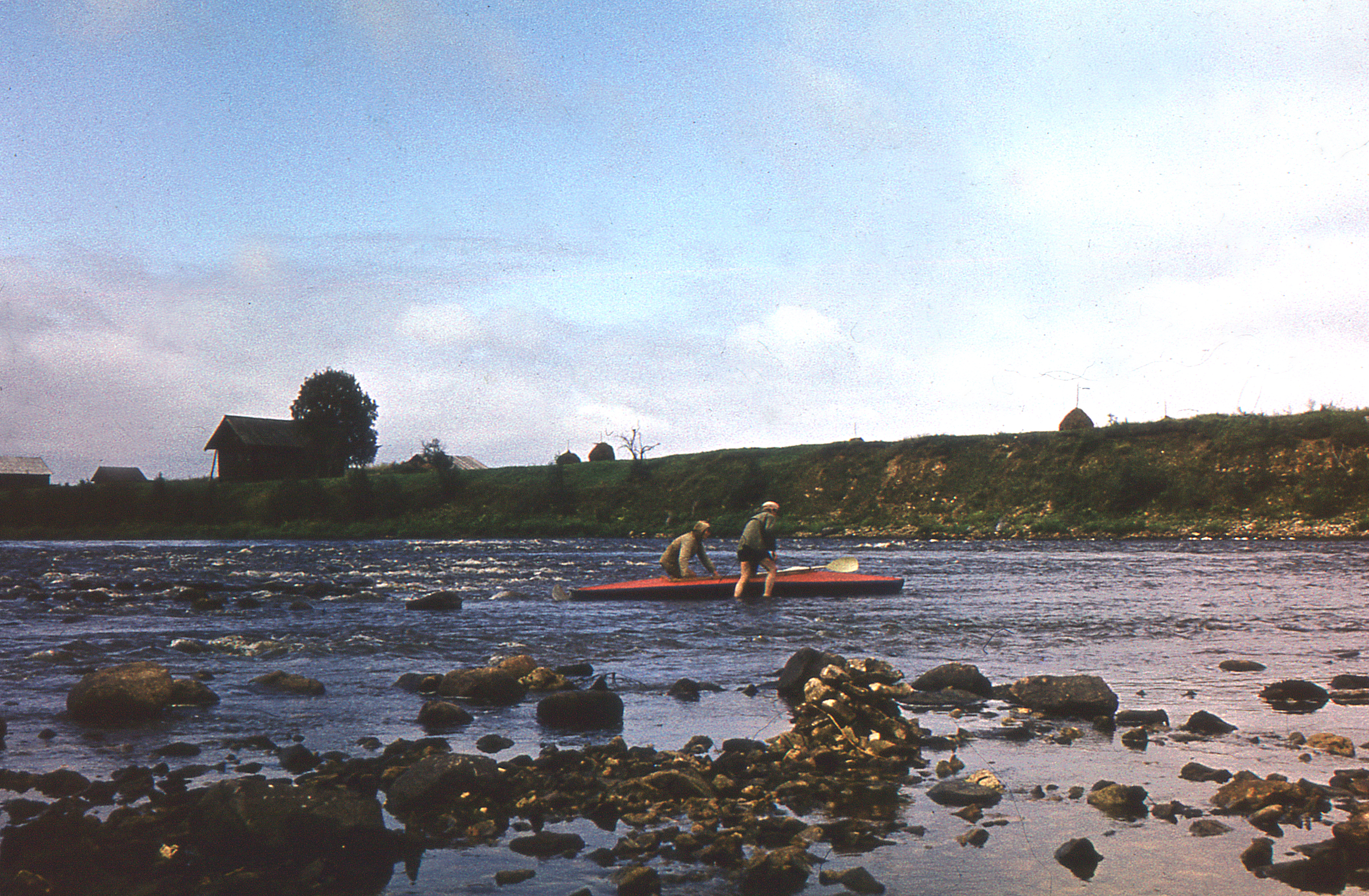
Riffle on the Onega River

A riffle is a shallow landform in a flowing channel. Colloquially, it is a shallow place in a river where water flows quickly past rocks. However, in geology a riffle has specific characteristics.

== Topographic, sedimentary and hydraulic indicators ==
Riffles almost always have a discharge much lower than that of the flow that fills the channel (approximately 10–20%), and as a result the water moving over a riffle appears shallow and fast, with a wavy, disturbed water surface. The water's surface over a riffle at low flow also has a much steeper slope than that over other in-channel landforms. Channel sections with a mean water surface slope of roughly 0.1 to 0.5% exhibit riffles, though they can occur in steeper or gentler sloping channels with coarser or finer bed materials, respectively. Except in the period after a flood (when fresh material is deposited on a riffle), the sediment on the riverbed in a riffle is usually much coarser than on that in any other in-channel landform.

Terrestrial valleys normally consist of channels – geometric depressions in the valley floor carved by flowing water – and overbank regions that include floodplains and terraces. Some channels have shapes and sizes that hardly change along the river; these do not have riffles. However, many channels exhibit readily apparent changes in width, bed elevation, and slope. In these cases, scientists realized that the riverbed often tends to rise and fall with distance downstream relative to an average elevation of the river's slope. That led scientists to map the bed elevation down the deepest path in a channel, called the thalweg, to obtain a longitudinal profile. Then, the piecewise linear slope of the river is computed and removed to leave just the rise and fall of the elevation about the channel's trendline. According to the zero-crossing method, riffles are all the locations along the channel whose residual elevation is greater than zero. Because of the prevalence of this method for identifying and mapping riffles, riffles are often thought of as part of a paired sequence, alternating with pools (the lows between the riffles). However, modern topographic maps of rivers with meter-scale resolution reveal that rivers exhibit a diversity of in-channel landforms.

For a long time, scientists have observed that, all other things being equal, riffles tend to be substantially wider than other in-channel landforms, but only recently has there been high enough quality of river maps to confirm that this is true. The physical mechanism that explains why this happens is called flow convergence routing. This mechanism may be used in river engineering to design self-sustainable riffles, given a suitable sediment supply and flow regime. When an in-channel landform is shallow and narrow, instead of shallow and wide, it is called a nozzle.

== Importance to environment ==
Riffles are very important to the life in a stream, and many aquatic species rely on them in one way or another. Many species of benthic macroinvertebrates rely on the highly oxygenated, fairly unsedimented waters present in a riffle. Many species of fish, including rare and endangered species use riffles to spawn in. Not only do fish spawn in and around riffles, they are also productive feeding grounds for fish, and in turn other predators that feed on fish. Riffles also serve to aerate the water, increasing the amount of dissolved oxygen in the body of water. Water with high and relatively stable levels of dissolved oxygen is typically considered to be a healthy ecosystem because it can generally support greater biodiversity and total biomass.

=== Macroinvertebrates in riffles ===
Litter patches are a collection of leaves, coarse particulate organic matter, and small woody stems that can be found throughout riffles. In riffles, these patches form at a velocity between 13 and 89 cm/sec, which allows for certain types of litter to be more abundant in riffles because they can stand up to the flow. Leaf litter is most commonly found in riffles, and thus influenced the type of macroinvertebrate functional group is found in riffles, like stoneflies being the dominant shredder species found in riffles. Other macroinvertebrates found in riffles are mayflies (Ephemeroptera). While, in general, the population densities are higher in riffles than pools, some groups like flies Diptera are somewhat less present in riffles, with a low density in riffles compared to pools. Nonbiting midges(Diptera, Chironomidae) and aquatic worms (Class Oligochaeta) are also located in riffles.

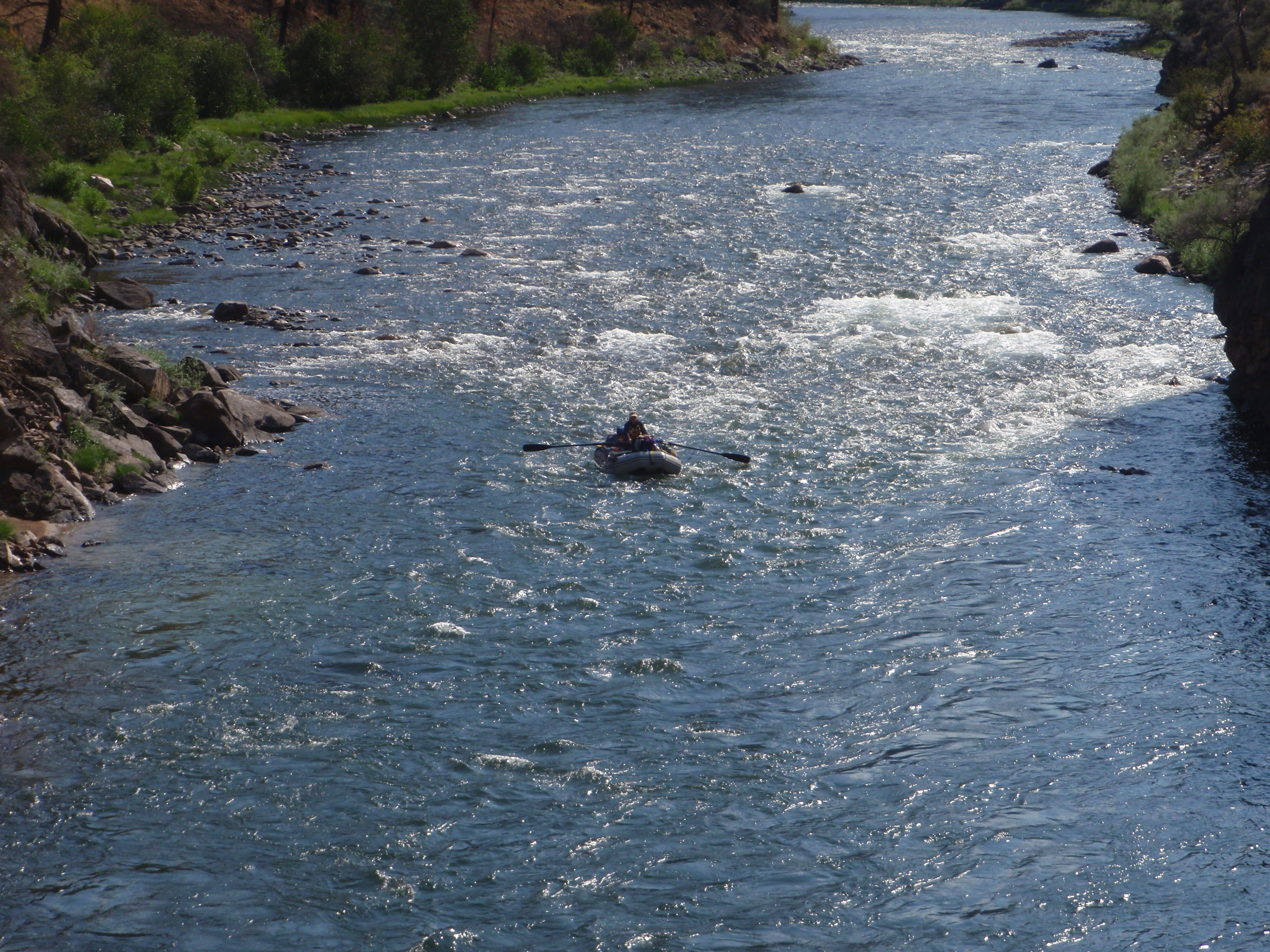
A raft in a Class II- riffle on the Middle Fork Salmon

Riffles also create a safe habitat for macroinvertebrates because of the varying depth, velocity, and substrate type found in the riffle. Densities of macroinvertebrates vary riffle to riffle because of seasonality or the habitat surrounding the riffle, but macroinvertebrate makeup is fairly consistent. While it can only be assumed that riffles can host a higher level of densities because of higher dissolved oxygen levels, there is a proven positive association between phosphate levels and macroinvertebrates in riffles, indicating that phosphate is an important nutrient for them. Seasonality is important for macroinvertebrate densities, and is characterized by temperature, like summer and winter, or it can be characterized by wetness, like wet and dry seasons. Macroinvertebrates are found in lower abundance during the rainy or wet season due to the high, constant amount of water into the riffle changing the system’s temperature, water velocity, and the aquatic community structure. Also, food, shelter and low flow rates during the dry season make it a more habitable time for higher densities of macroinvertebrates.

== Anthropogenic threats ==
Riffles provide important habitat and food production for various aquatic organisms, but humans have altered aquatic ecosystems worldwide through infrastructure and land use changes. Human interference of stream or river flow decreases sediment sizes, resulting in fewer riffles.

Specifically, weirs and other dams have reduced existing riffles by flattening the channel with smaller substrate, resulting in habitat fragmentation. Dam removal has increased in recent times and its effects on riffles vary and are complex, but generally, riffles may redevelop. As these riffles develop, however, they often have a lower biodiversity than the pre-dam ecosystem but benefit aquatic biodiversity in the long term. Following weir removal, riffle fish populations have increased in diversity and density, and these fish have moved upstream to inhabit new riffles that redevelop after dam removal. The importance of riffles in supporting diverse assemblages of aquatic biota within streams and rivers may contribute to the increasing trend of dam removal.

Human land use change, specifically development of land, can indirectly affect riffles and riffle quality. Terrestrial vegetation, such as tree branches and leaf litter, contribute to the formation of riffles and stabilization of the ecosystem's channel, and as development reduces this vegetation, riffles may be diminished. Species richness and diversity within riffles are susceptible to anthropogenic land use changes, and management options for restoring these riffles to increase aquatic biodiversity include removing sand and sedimentation and enhancing water flow, to offset impacts from land use change.
