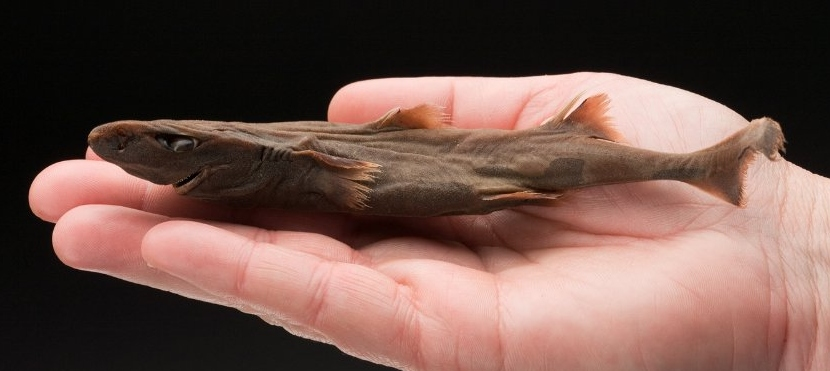
- Specimen
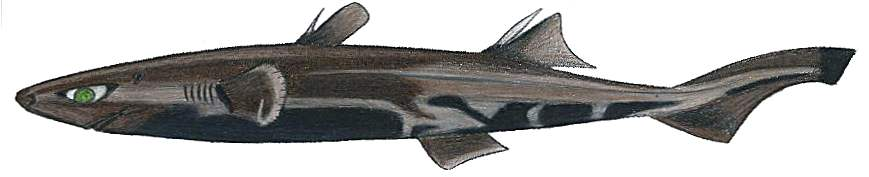

Conservation status
- Least Concern (IUCN 3.1)

Scientific classification
- Kingdom: Animalia
- Phylum: Chordata
- Class: Chondrichthyes
- Subclass: Elasmobranchii
- Division: Selachii
- Order: Squaliformes
- Family: Etmopteridae
- Genus: Etmopterus
- Species: E. perryi

Binomial name
- Etmopterus perryi (S. Springer & G. H. Burgess, 1985)
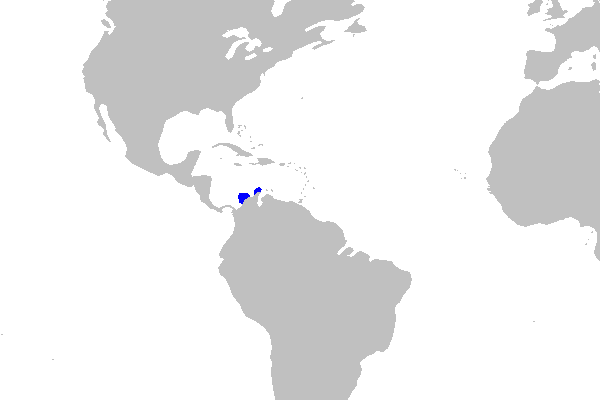
- Range of the dwarf lanternshark

= Dwarf lanternshark =

Species of shark

The dwarf lanternshark (Etmopterus perryi) is a species of dogfish shark in the family Etmopteridae and is the smallest shark in the world, reaching a maximum known length of 20 cm (8 in). It is known to be present only on the upper continental slopes off Colombia and Venezuela, at a depth of 283–439 m (928–1,440 ft). This species can be identified by its small size at maturity, long flattened head, and pattern of black ventral markings and a mid-dorsal line. Like other members of its genus, it is capable of producing light from a distinctive array of photophores. Reproduction is aplacental viviparous, with females gestating two or three young at a time. The dwarf lanternshark is not significant to commercial fisheries, but could be threatened by mortality from bycatch; the degree of impact from human activities on its population is unknown.

== Taxonomy and phylogeny ==
American ichthyologists Stewart Springer and George H. Burgess described the dwarf lanternshark from specimens collected via trawling by the U.S. Fish and Wildlife Service research ship Oregon in 1964. They dubbed the new species in honor of noted shark biologist Perry W. Gilbert, and published their findings in a 1985 Copeia paper. The type specimen is a 18.2 cm (7.2 in) long female caught in the Caribbean Sea off the coast of Colombia. This species is grouped with the velvet belly lantern shark (E. spinax), Caribbean lanternshark (E. hillianus), fringefin lanternshark (E. schultzi), brown lanternshark (E. unicolor), broadbanded lanternshark (E. gracilispinis), and combtooth lanternshark (E. decacuspidatus) in having irregularly arranged, needle-shaped dermal denticles.

== Distribution and habitat ==
At present, the dwarf lanternshark has been reported only from a small area of the Caribbean Sea off the coasts of Colombia and Venezuela, occurring between Barranquilla and Santa Marta, near the Guajira Peninsula, and between the Los Testigos Islands and Grenada. This shark apparently inhabits the upper continental slope at a depth of 283–439 m (928–1,440 ft).

== Description ==
The dwarf lanternshark appears to reach a maximum length of about 20 cm (7.9 in) (female). It has a long, wide, flattened head comprising a fourth to a fifth of its total length. The eyes are large, twice as long as high, with the anterior and posterior corners acute. The nares are large and preceded by poorly developed flaps of skin. There are 25–32 tooth rows in the upper jaw and 30–34 tooth rows in the lower jaw. The upper teeth of adult males have a single cusp flanked by two pairs of smaller cusplets, while the upper teeth of females are more robust and have only one pair of lateral cusplets flanking the central cusp. The lower teeth each have a single, strongly oblique cusp, and their bases are interlocked to form a continuous cutting surface. Scattered, sparse papillae are inside the mouth and on the edges of the gill arches. The five pairs of gill slits are small.

The trunk is short, with two relatively closely spaced, large dorsal fins bearing grooved spines in front. The first dorsal fin originates over the trailing margins of the pectoral fins. The second dorsal fin has twice the area of the first and is larger than the pectoral or pelvic fins, and originates over the end of the pelvic fin bases. There is no anal fin. The caudal fin is low, with a moderate lower lobe and a ventral notch near the tip of the upper lobe. The skin is densely covered by thin, needle-like dermal denticles in a random pattern, except for the lips and the tips of the fins. This shark is dark brown with a striking and distinctive pattern of black markings on its ventral surface, a continuous or broken, fine black line along the middle of its back (but without a white band like in the similar Caribbean lanternshark), a black band on the end of its caudal fin, and a dark blotch on its lower caudal fin lobe. Some of the ventral black markings are composed of light-producing photophores, while others (including the patch behind the pelvic fins) are composed of pigment-containing chromatophores. The largest known individual is 21.2 cm (8.3 in) long.

== Biology and ecology ==
Perhaps the smallest living shark species, male dwarf lanternsharks mature at a length of 16–17.5 cm (6.3–6.9 in) and females from a length of 15.5 cm (6.1 in) with 19–20 cm (7.5–7.9 in) long pregnant individuals known. The spined pygmy shark (Squaliolus laticaudus) and the pygmy ribbontail catshark (Eridacnis radcliffei) are known to attain maturity at comparably small sizes; difficulties in assessing the reproductive maturity of sharks precludes stating one of these species as definitively smaller than the others. This species is aplacental viviparous, with the developing fetuses being sustained by a yolk sac until birth. Females bear litters of two or three young, each measuring 5.5–6.0 cm (2.2–2.4 in) long.

== Human interactions ==
Because of its very small size, the dwarf lanternshark is of no economic value. Its low fecundity and limited known range may merit concern if commercial fisheries in the region are taking it as bycatch. The International Union for Conservation of Nature assesses it as least concern.
