= Brown lanternshark =

Conservation status
- Data Deficient (IUCN 3.1)

Scientific classification
- Kingdom: Animalia
- Phylum: Chordata
- Class: Chondrichthyes
- Subclass: Elasmobranchii
- Division: Selachii
- Order: Squaliformes
- Family: Etmopteridae
- Genus: Etmopterus
- Species: E. unicolor

Binomial name
- Etmopterus unicolor (Engelhardt, 1912)
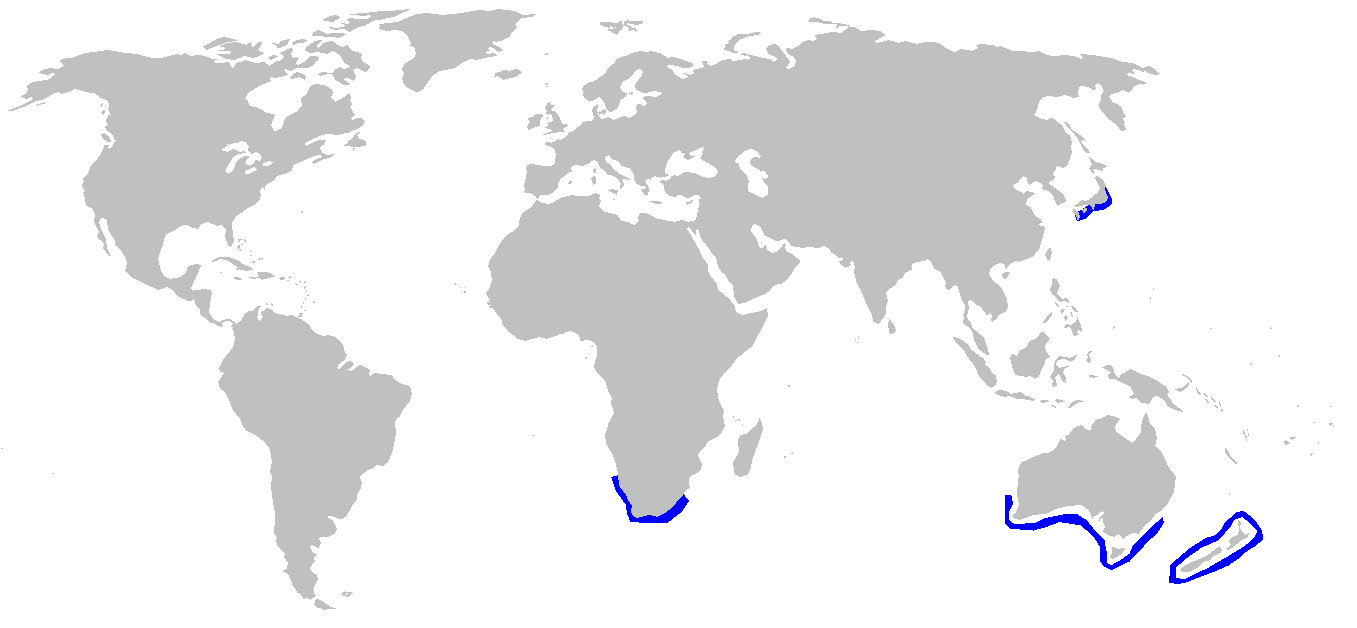
- Range of the brown lanternshark

Synonyms
- Spinax unicolor Engelhardt, 1912; Etmopterus tasmaniensis Myagkov & Pavlov, 1986

Species of shark

The brown lanternshark or bristled lanternshark (Etmopterus unicolor) is a little-known species of deep-sea dogfish shark in the family Etmopteridae. It is found off Japan and New Zealand, and possibly also South Africa and Australia, typically deeper than 300 m (980 ft). This species can be distinguished from other lanternsharks by its coloration, which is a uniform dark gray or brown without the ventral surface being much darker and clearly delineated from the rest of the body. The brown lanternshark feeds on small bony fishes, cephalopods, and crustaceans. Reproduction is ovoviviparous, with females giving birth to 9–18 young. An unusually high proportion of individuals in Suruga Bay are hermaphrodites, with both male and female characteristics.

== Taxonomy ==
The brown lanternshark was first described by Robert Engelhardt as Spinax unicolor in 1912, in the scientific journal Zoologischer Anzeiger. The type specimen was a 55-cm-long female from Sagami Bay, Japan. In 1965, Tokiharu Abe redescribed this species and moved it to the genus Etmopterus. The Australian Etmopterus "sp. B" (known as the "bristled lanternshark") is now tentatively believed to be the same as this species. It is grouped with the velvet belly lantern shark (E. spinax), Caribbean lanternshark (E. hillianus), fringefin lanternshark (E. schultzi), broadbanded lanternshark (E. gracilispinis), combtooth lanternshark (E. decacuspidatus), and dwarf lanternshark (E. perryi) in having irregularly arranged, needle-shaped dermal denticles. Etmopterus compagnoi is a questionably valid species as it may be based on the brown lanternshark or Etmopterus baxteri.

== Distribution and habitat ==
Confirmed specimens of the brown lanternshark have been captured from off southern Honshu, Japan, and around New Zealand. If E. compagnoi and E. sp. B are also considered, then the known range of this species is extended to off South Africa (and possibly southern Namibia) and southern Australia. The brown lanternshark inhabits continental shelves and seamounts at a depth of 402–1,380 m (1,319–4,528 ft), though is most common below 900 m (3,000 ft). It is generally found deeper than other lanternsharks that share its range, and may have midwater habits.

== Description ==
The brown lanternshark has a robust, almost cylindrical body with a wide, flattened head. Around 28 tooth rows are in the upper jaw and 34 tooth rows are in the lower jaw. The upper teeth have a pointed central cusp flanked by fewer than three pairs of lateral cusplets, while the bottom teeth are large and tipped with a strongly angled triangular cusp. The five pairs of gill slits are relatively large. The first dorsal fin is low with a minute leading spine; the second dorsal fin is twice as high as the first with a much larger spine. The caudal peduncle is short, leading to a long caudal fin with the upper lobe much larger than the lower.

The dermal denticles of this shark are tiny and densely placed with no regular pattern; each denticle has a four-cornered base and rises to a narrow, slightly curved point. The denticles of females are firmly attached, while those of males are easily removed. The coloration is a plain dark gray or brown, slightly darker below and lighter on the dorsal fin margins. Unlike other lanternsharks, there is a not a sharp contrast between the dorsal and ventral colors. There is a horizontal black line on the base of the tail, and another fainter black mark over the pelvic fins. The maximum reported length is 64 cm (25 in) for males and 75 cm (30 in) for females.

== Biology and ecology ==
The most important prey of the brown lanternshark are bony fishes (mainly lanternfishes), followed by cephalopods (mainly the squid Watasenia scintillans), and finally crustaceans (mainly prawns such as Acanthephyra). A known parasite of this shark is a species of copepod in the genus Lerneopoda.

Like other lanternsharks, the brown lanternshark is ovoviviparous, meaning the young hatch inside the mother's uterus and are sustained by a yolk sac. The litter size is 9–18. Newborns measure 17 cm (6.7 in) in length. Males reach sexual maturity at a length of 46 cm (18 in), and females at a length of 50 cm (20 in). A study of brown lanternsharks in Suruga Bay by Yano and Tanaka (1989) found a 23% prevalence of hermaphroditism within the population. Of the 16 hermaphrodites examined, 15 were functional females (and some were pregnant) that also possessed well-developed claspers (male intromittent organs), while one was a functional male with ovarian tissue in the left testis. The reason why so many sharks in Suruga Bay are hermaphroditic is unclear, but has been speculated to relate to pollution.

== Human interactions ==
Although it may be caught as bycatch and discarded, the brown lanternshark is harmless and of no significance to fisheries. Its conservation status has not been evaluated beyond Data Deficient by the International Union for Conservation of Nature. In June 2018 the New Zealand Department of Conservation classified the brown lanternshark as "Not Threatened" with the qualifier "Secure Overseas" under the New Zealand Threat Classification System.
