= Barrie's lanternshark =

Conservation status
- Least Concern (IUCN 3.1)

Scientific classification
- Kingdom: Animalia
- Phylum: Chordata
- Class: Chondrichthyes
- Subclass: Elasmobranchii
- Division: Selachii
- Order: Squaliformes
- Family: Etmopteridae
- Genus: Etmopterus
- Species: E. brosei

Binomial name
- Etmopterus brosei Ebert, Leslie & Weigmann, 2021
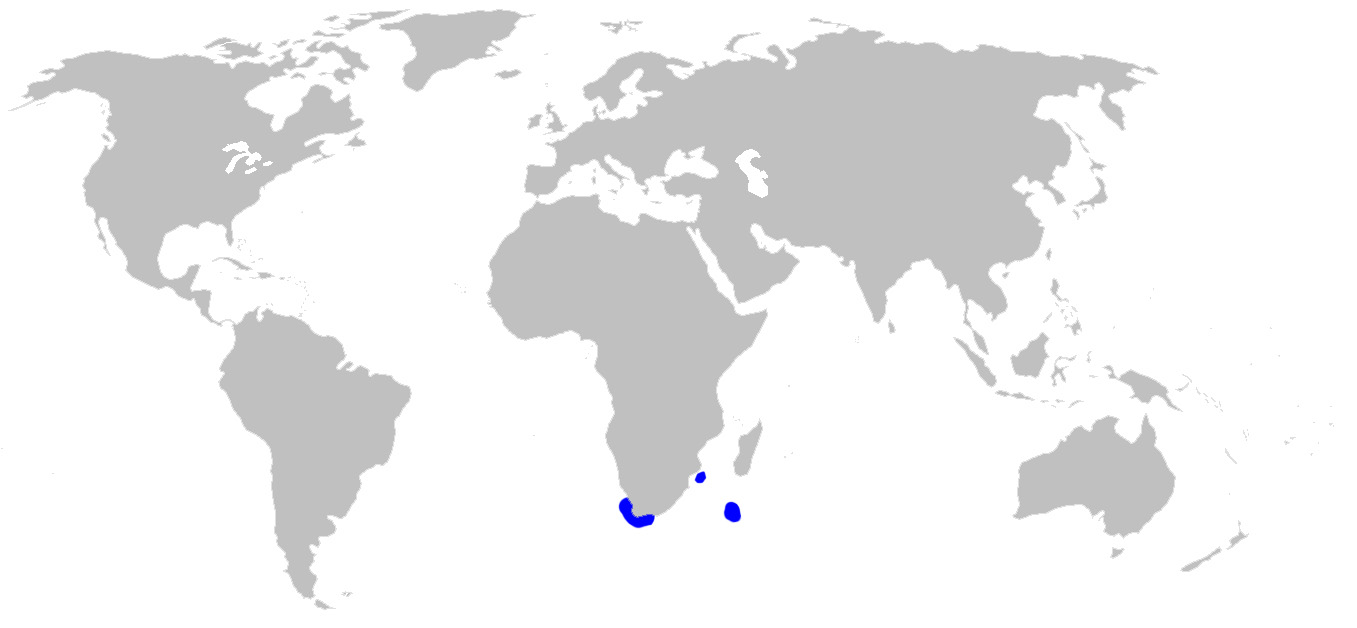
- Range of Barrie's lanternshark

Species of lanternshark

Barrie's lanternshark (Etmopterus brosei) is a species of lanternshark of the family Etmopteridae, found in the Southwest Indian Ocean and Southeast Atlantic Ocean (precisely in South Africa, Madagascar Ridge, and southern Mozambique). It lives on seamounts and continental slopes at depths of 480–1,200 m (1,570–3,940 ft). This deep-water shark was previously misidentified with sculpted lanternshark and also resembles blackbelly lanternshark in having linear rows of dermal denticles.

Barrie's lanternshark has these sets of characteristics which making it differ from its congeners: the dermal denticles arrangement along the body; the presence of dermal denticles on the dorsal fin base; the arrangement of flank and caudal markings; the shape and size of flank markings; and the vertebral count.

This shark is sometimes accidentally caught by deep-water fisheries operating in southern Africa. Nevertheless, the major population of this species lives deeper than the fisheries.
