= Pygmy lanternshark =

Conservation status
- Least Concern (IUCN 3.1)

Scientific classification
- Kingdom: Animalia
- Phylum: Chordata
- Class: Chondrichthyes
- Subclass: Elasmobranchii
- Division: Selachii
- Order: Squaliformes
- Family: Etmopteridae
- Genus: Etmopterus
- Species: E. fusus

Binomial name
- Etmopterus fusus Last, G. H. Burgess & Séret, 2002
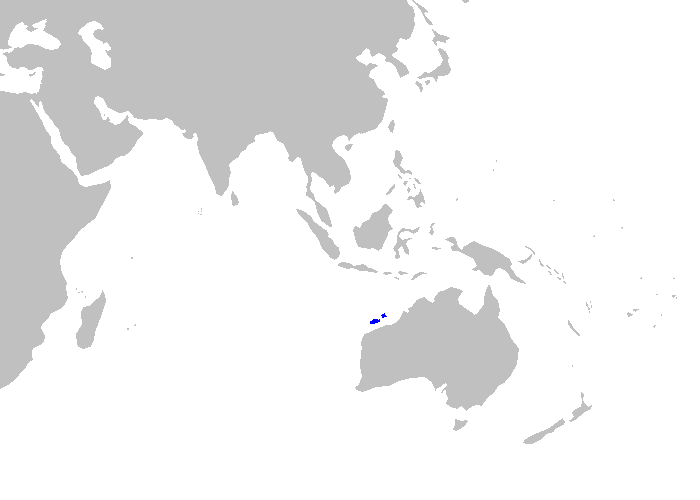
- Range of the pygmy lanternshark (in blue)

Species of shark

The pygmy lanternshark (Etmopterus fusus) is a shark of the family Etmopteridae found in the eastern Indian Ocean from northern Western Australia and possibly Java, at depths of between 430 and 550 m. Its length is up to 26 cm.

Reproduction is ovoviviparous.
