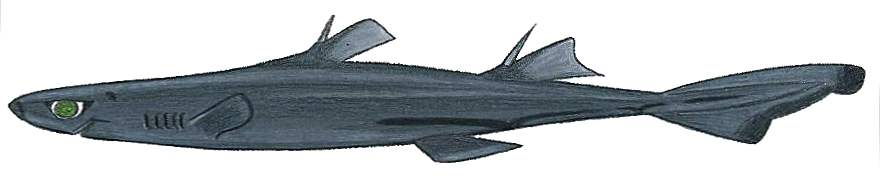

Conservation status
- Least Concern (IUCN 3.1)

Scientific classification
- Kingdom: Animalia
- Phylum: Chordata
- Class: Chondrichthyes
- Subclass: Elasmobranchii
- Division: Selachii
- Order: Squaliformes
- Family: Etmopteridae
- Genus: Etmopterus
- Species: E. polli

Binomial name
- Etmopterus polli Bigelow, Schroeder & S. Springer, 1953
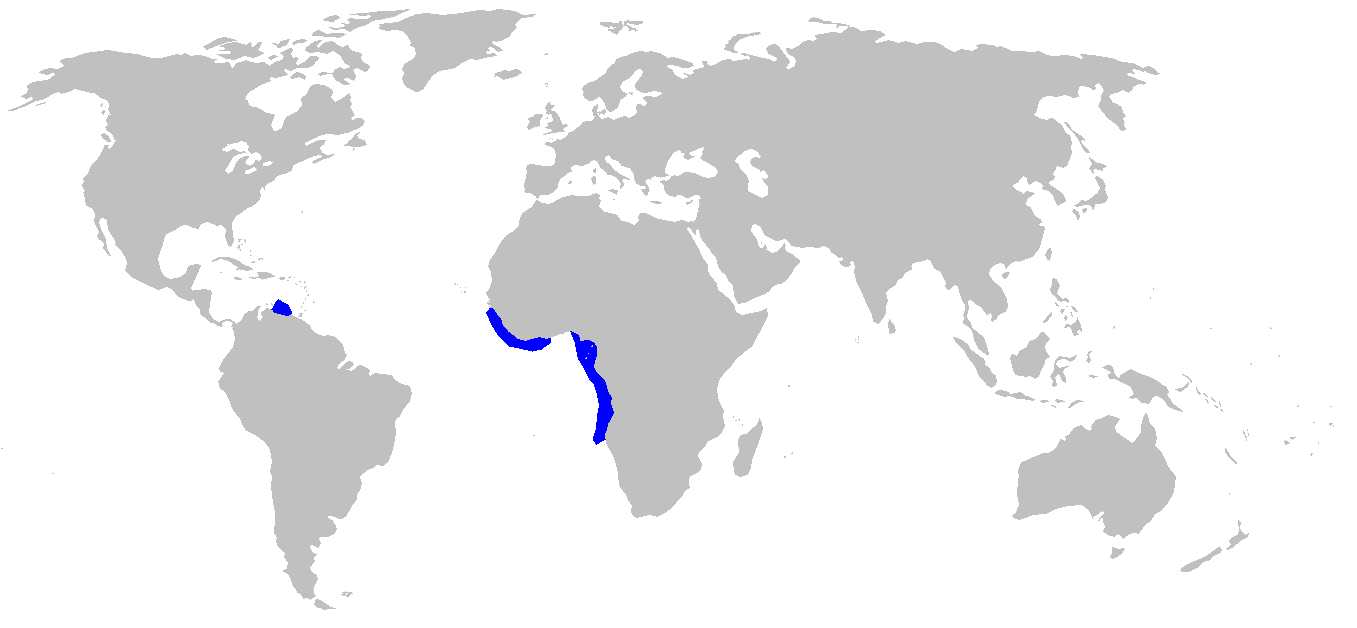
- Range of the African lanternshark (in blue)

= African lanternshark =

Species of shark

The African Lanternshark (Etmopterus polli) is a member of the family Etmopteridae. Found in the Atlantic, on the west coast of Africa, the African Lanternshark is known for its bioluminescent features, which aid in its hunting habits. Little is known about them; their bioluminescent features, mating and reproduction, and diet remain largely unknown. Over the past 20 or so years, research has picked up, focusing on learning about their placoid scales and reproduction.

== Description ==
=== Anatomy ===
The African Lanternshark is blackish grey in color, with bioluminescent features on various parts of their bodies, including their undersides. Its length is up to 30 cm. The African Lanternshark has teeth typical of its family; top teeth have longer cusps and are smooth edged.

=== Diet ===
Their diet persists of fish, crustaceans, and cephalopods, which it attracts using its bioluminescent features.

=== Reproduction ===
Like other lanternsharks, the African Lanternshark reproduces ovoviviparously.

=== Bioluminescence ===
The Etmopteridae family is one of only two families in which every member has bioluminescent features. Lanternsharks contain special adaptations which both are responsible for their bioluminescence and allow them to live at the depth they do. They bioluminescence is controlled by the sharks' hormones, including melatonin. Researchers have also found the presence of luciferin, which can create bioluminescence. Additionally, the sharks have placoid scales on their body, which, in addition to aiding in swimming, are suspected to express bioluminescent light. The lanternsharks also have especially anatomical features within their eyes, which allow them to pick up on lower light levels at the depths at which they live. This adaptation gives the sharks heightened visibility, allowing them to capture their prey more easily.

== Distribution and habitat ==
The African lanternshark (Etmopterus polli) is a shark of the family Etmopteridae found in the eastern Atlantic between latitudes 12°N and 18°S, at depths between 300 and 1,000 m.

== Taxonomy and evolution ==
=== Nonclemature ===
The shark is named in honor of Belgian ichthyologist Max Poll, who had discovered the species and sent the specimens to Harvard's Museum of Comparative Zoology for description.

== Relationship with humans ==
African Lanternsharks are mainly considered bycatch, with no other greater human uses, though they are sometimes consumed.

=== In captivity ===
It is very difficult to care for lanternshark young in captivity. Lanternsharks must be cared for using a process called "seawater adaptation." This helps to acclimate the lanternshark offspring from artificial womb to the sea.

== Protection ==
Currently, the African Lanternshark is rated as "least concern" in terms of its endangerment.

== Current studies ==
Much is not known about African Lanternsharks today. However, over the past 20 or so years, more research has begun to surface on their bioluminescence and anatomy. Lanternsharks reproduce ovoviviparously. This means that fetuses develop within an egg in the parent, which then hatches, and young are born live. A 2023 study from the Okinawa Churashima Research Institute used the example of lanternshark reproduction to better our ability to care for lanternsharks and other sharks in captivity. The study utilized changing the chemical make-up of seawater to better suit the needs of the lanternshark.

Another recent study from 2020 looked into the purpose of placoid scales on Lanternsharks. The study looked at the scales' role in bioluminescence and the evolution of the scales on the sharks.
