= Pink lanternshark =

Conservation status
- Least Concern (IUCN 3.1)

Scientific classification
- Kingdom: Animalia
- Phylum: Chordata
- Class: Chondrichthyes
- Subclass: Elasmobranchii
- Division: Selachii
- Order: Squaliformes
- Family: Etmopteridae
- Genus: Etmopterus
- Species: E. dianthus

Binomial name
- Etmopterus dianthus Last, G. H. Burgess & Séret, 2002
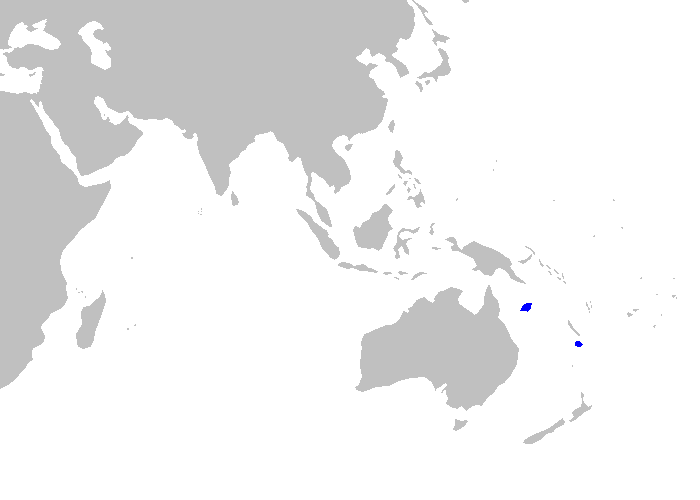
- Range of the pink lanternshark (in blue)

Species of shark

The pink lanternshark (Etmopterus dianthus) is a shark of the family Etmopteridae found around Australia and New Caledonia, at depths of between 108 and 880 m. Its length is up to 41 cm.

Reproduction is ovoviviparous.
