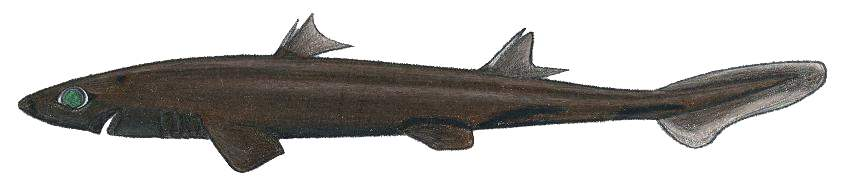

Conservation status
- Least Concern (IUCN 3.1)

Scientific classification
- Kingdom: Animalia
- Phylum: Chordata
- Class: Chondrichthyes
- Subclass: Elasmobranchii
- Division: Selachii
- Order: Squaliformes
- Family: Etmopteridae
- Genus: Etmopterus
- Species: E. robinsi

Binomial name
- Etmopterus robinsi Schofield & G. H. Burgess, 1997
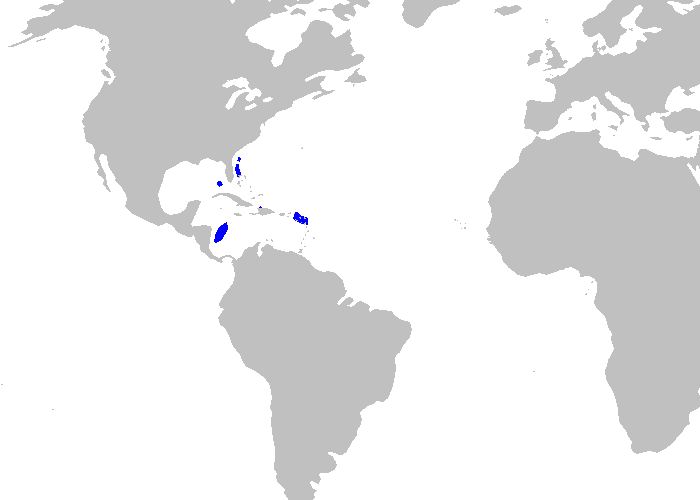
- Range of the West Indian lanternshark (in blue)

= West Indian lanternshark =

Species of shark

The West Indian lanternshark (Etmopterus robinsi) is a shark of the family Etmopteridae found in the western central Atlantic, at depths between 400 and 800 m (1,300 and 2,600 ft). Its length is up to 31 cm (12 in).

Reproduction is ovoviviparous.
