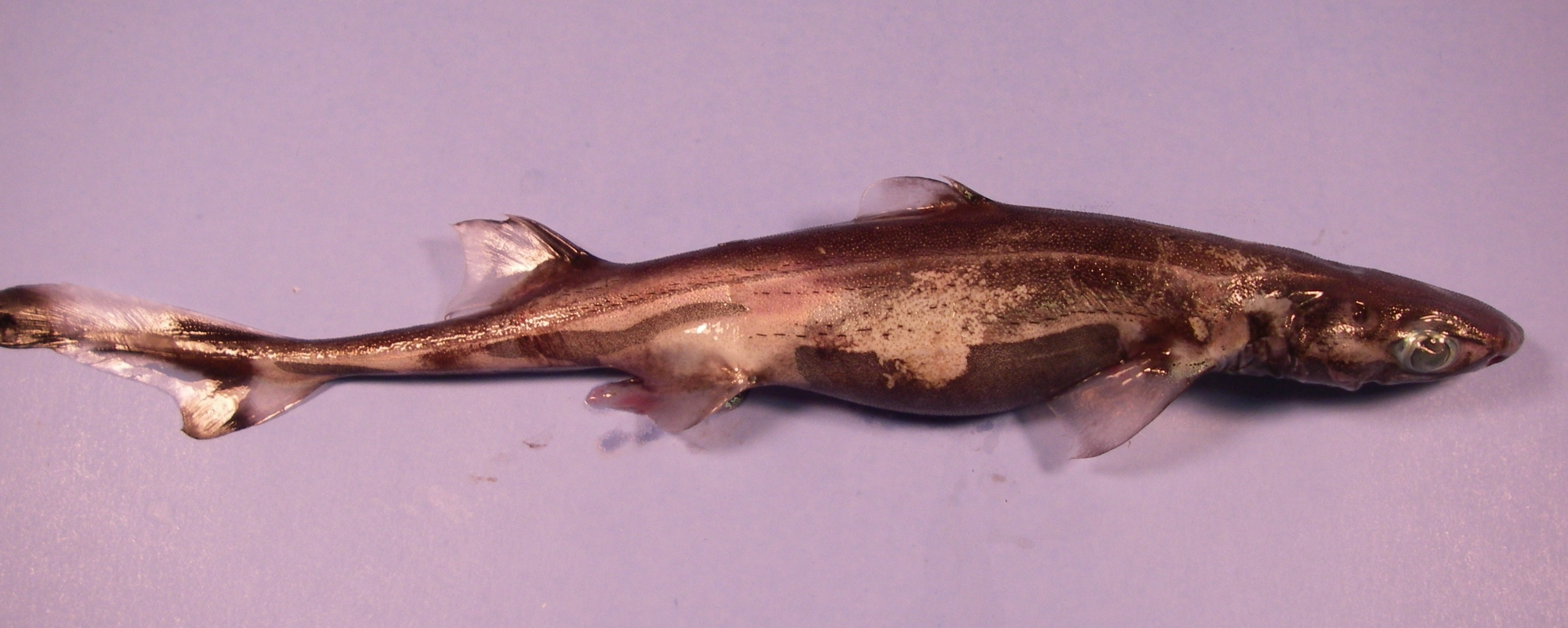

Conservation status
- Least Concern (IUCN 3.1)

Scientific classification
- Kingdom: Animalia
- Phylum: Chordata
- Class: Chondrichthyes
- Subclass: Elasmobranchii
- Division: Selachii
- Order: Squaliformes
- Family: Etmopteridae
- Genus: Etmopterus
- Species: E. virens

Binomial name
- Etmopterus virens Bigelow, Schroeder & S. Springer, 1953
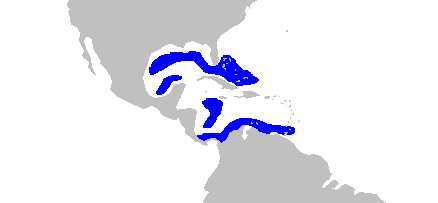
- Range of the green lanternshark

= Green lanternshark =

Species of shark

The green lanternshark (Etmopterus virens) is a species of dogfish shark in the family Etmopteridae, found in the western central Atlantic Ocean. This species usually occurs on the upper continental slope below a depth of 350 m (1,150 ft). Reaching 26 cm (10 in) in length, the green lanternshark has a slender body with a long, thin tail and low, conical dermal denticles on its flanks. It is dark brown or gray with ventral black coloration, which contain light-emitting photophores that may serve a cryptic and/or social function. Green lanternsharks are thought to be gregarious and may attack their prey, squid and octopus often larger than themselves, in packs. Reproduction is aplacental viviparous, with females giving birth to litters of one to three young. This relatively common shark is an occasional, valueless bycatch of commercial fisheries; currently it does not appear to be significantly threatened by human activities.

== Taxonomy ==
The green lanternshark was scientifically described in 1953 by Henry B. Bigelow, William C. Schroeder, and Stewart Springer, in the Bulletin of the Museum of Comparative Zoology at Harvard University. The type specimen was a 20.3-cm-long male caught at a depth of 403 m (1,322 ft) in the northern Gulf of Mexico. The specific epithet virens is Latin for "green".

== Distribution and habitat ==
The range of the green lanternshark is restricted to the upper continental slopes of the western central Atlantic. In the Gulf of Mexico, it occurs from Texas to Florida and Cuba, and off the Yucatan Peninsula. In the Caribbean Sea, it is found off Honduras and Nicaragua, and from Panama to Venezuela and perhaps as far as Brazil. This largely bottom-dwelling species has been caught at depths of 196–915 m (643–3,002 ft), with most individuals being found deeper than 350 m (1,150 ft).

== Description ==
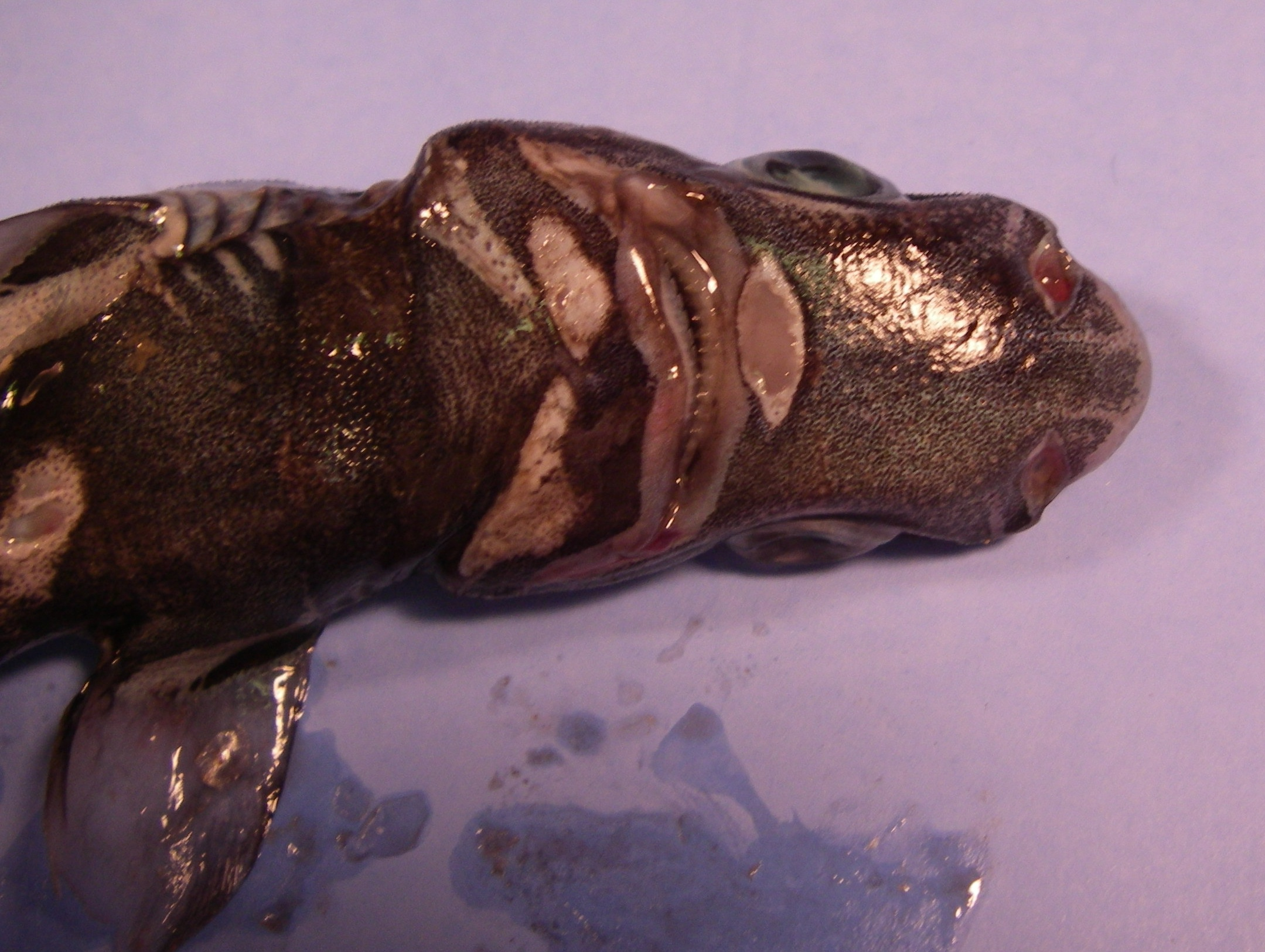
The black ventral markings of the green lanternshark contain light-emitting photophores.

A slim-bodied shark with a short, blunt snout and a long, narrow tail, the green lanternshark attains a maximum known length of 26 cm (10 in). The eyes are very large and oval in shape. The nostrils are preceded by short skin flaps. There are 29–34 tooth rows in the upper jaw, each tooth with a narrow central cusp flanked by fewer than three pairs of lateral cusplets. The lower jaw contains 24–32 tooth rows, their bases interlocking to form a continuous cutting surface and each tooth bearing a horizontal narrow cusp. The five pairs of gill slits are very short, comparable to the spiracle in size.

The first dorsal fin bears a spine in front and originates over the trailing margin of the broad and rounded pectoral fins. The second dorsal fin also bears a spine in front and is over twice as large as the first in area, with the span between it and the first dorsal fin approximately equal to the distance between the snout tip and first gill slit. The anal fin is absent. The caudal fin is low and narrow, with an indistinct lower lobe and an upper lobe about as long as the head. The dermal denticles on the sides of the body are stout and thorn-shaped, widely spaced without any regular pattern; the snout is mostly covered by denticles. The dorsal coloration is dark brown to gray; the undersides of the body and snout are black, with a broad, black marking above and behind each pelvic fin, and thin, black marks on the tail. These black markings contain numerous light-emitting photophores.

== Biology and ecology ==
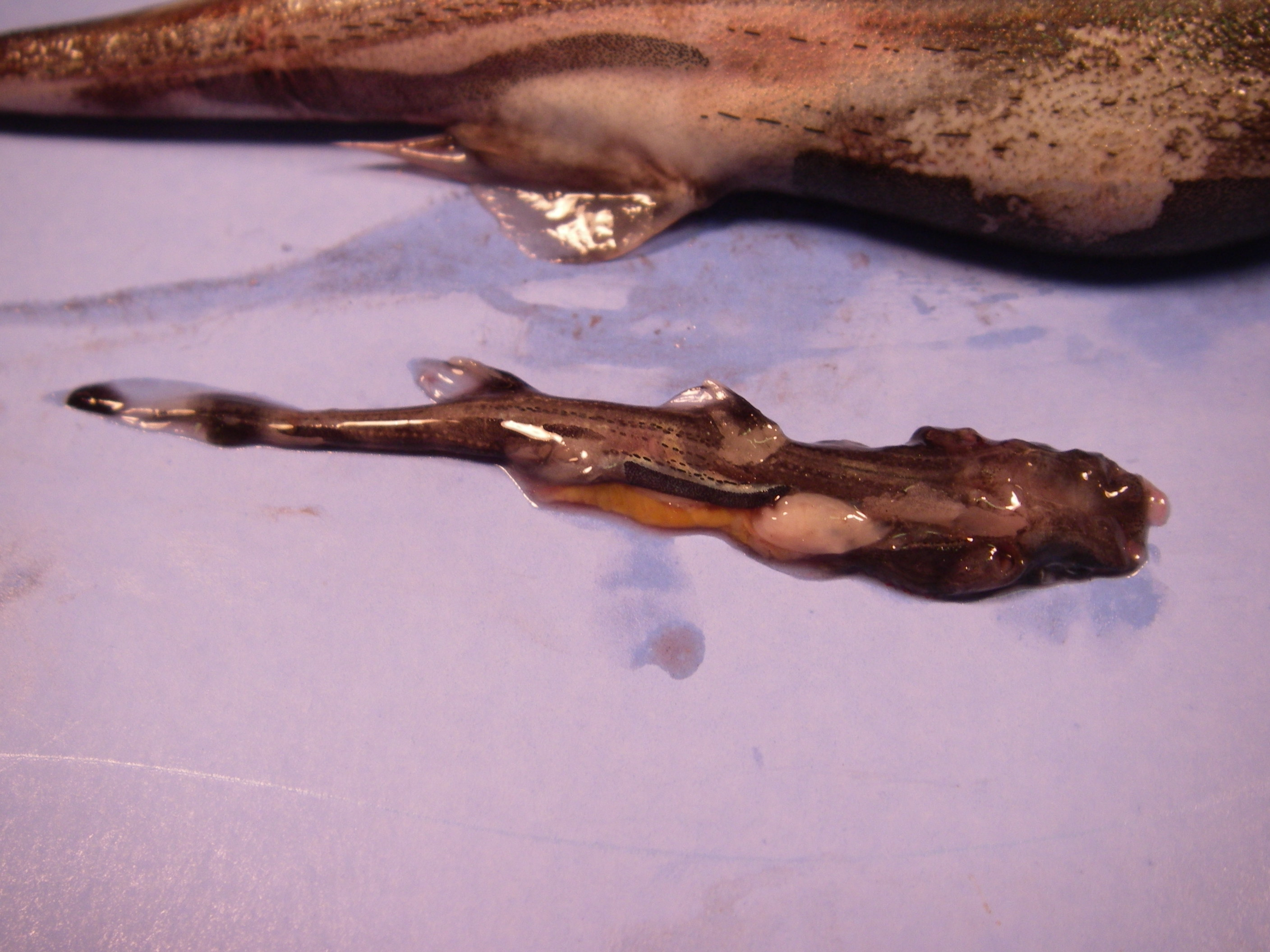
A green lanternshark pup alongside an adult

The ventrally positioned photophores of the green lanternshark may serve to disguise its silhouette from potential predators via counter-illumination. Like many other bioluminescent, deep-sea sharks, it has a yellow spot over its pineal gland that acts as a "window" for the detection of ambient light levels. This shark is caught sporadically, but in large numbers at a time, suggesting they may travel in schools. If so, their photophores may also allow individual sharks in a group to keep sight of and coordinate with their cohorts.

Green lanternsharks feed mainly on squid and octopus, and are frequently found with cephalopod eyes and beaks in their stomachs so large that the sharks would have had to distend their jaws considerably to swallow them. It is uncertain how these diminutive sharks manage to overwhelm prey often much larger than themselves; Stewart Springer has proposed they may attack in packs, "swarming" over a single large squid or octopus with each shark sawing off pieces of flesh. As with other members of its family, this species is aplacental viviparous, with females giving birth to litters of one to three young. The newborn pups measure 9 cm (3.5 in) long; males attain sexual maturity at a length of 18.3–23.6 cm (7.2–9.3 in), and females at a length of 22.0–25.7 cm (8.7–10.1 in).

== Human interactions ==
Relatively common, the green lanternshark is caught infrequently as bycatch in deepwater fisheries, but has no commercial value because of its small size. The International Union for Conservation of Nature has assessed it as of Least Concern, as at present it appears to face no substantial threats. However, like many other deep-sea sharks, there is a paucity of information on this species, and vigilance is warranted regarding expanding fisheries within its range.
