= Shortfin smooth lanternshark =

Conservation status
- Least Concern (IUCN 3.1)

Scientific classification
- Kingdom: Animalia
- Phylum: Chordata
- Class: Chondrichthyes
- Subclass: Elasmobranchii
- Division: Selachii
- Order: Squaliformes
- Family: Etmopteridae
- Genus: Etmopterus
- Species: E. joungi

Binomial name
- Etmopterus joungi Knuckey, Ebert & G. H. Burgess, 2011
- Known range of the Shortfin smooth lanternshark (in blue)

Species of shark

The shortfin smooth lanternshark (Etmopterus joungi) is a shark of the family Etmopteridae found off the northeastern coast of Taiwan, at depths of between 430 and 550 m.
