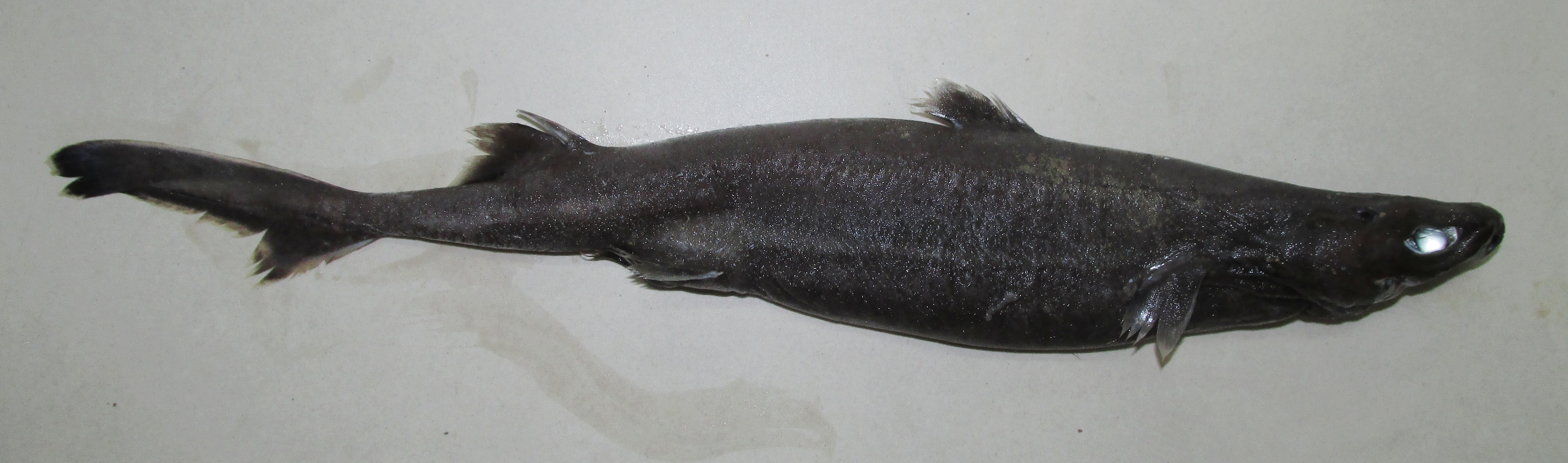
- Velvet belly lanternshark (Etmopterus spinax)
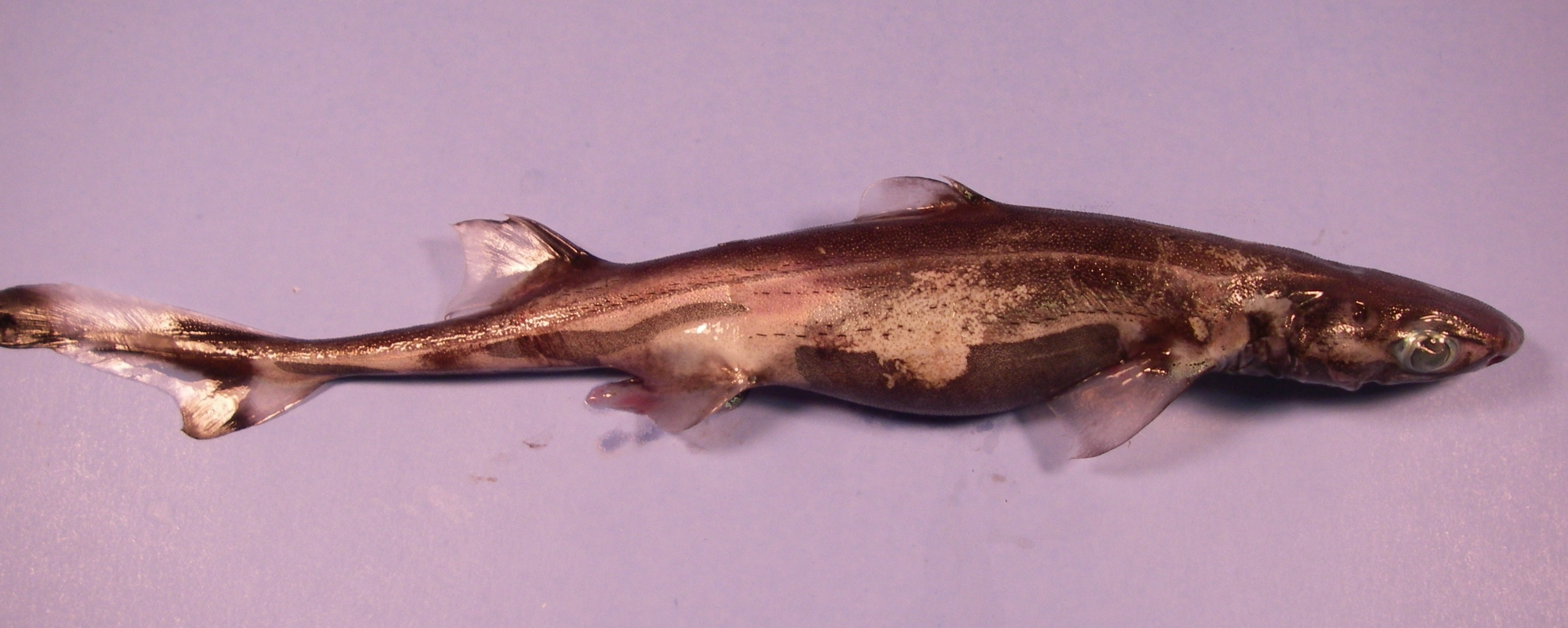
- Green lanternshark (Etmopterus virens)

Scientific classification
- Kingdom: Animalia
- Phylum: Chordata
- Class: Chondrichthyes
- Subclass: Elasmobranchii
- Division: Selachii
- Order: Squaliformes
- Family: Etmopteridae
- Genus: Etmopterus; Rafinesque, 1810

Type species
- Etmopterus aculeatus Rafinesque, 1810

= Etmopterus =

Etmopterus Temporal range: 48–0 Ma Middle Eocene to Present

Genus of sharks

Etmopterus is a genus of lantern sharks in the squaliform family Etmopteridae. They are found in deep sea ecosystems of the Atlantic, Indian and Pacific Oceans.

== Ecology ==
A number of species in this genus function as host to the specialized parasitic barnacle Anelasma squalicola, which embeds itself into the skin of the shark and extracts nutrients from its bloodstream.

== Species ==
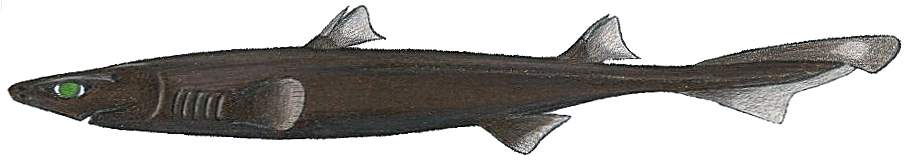
E. bigelowi

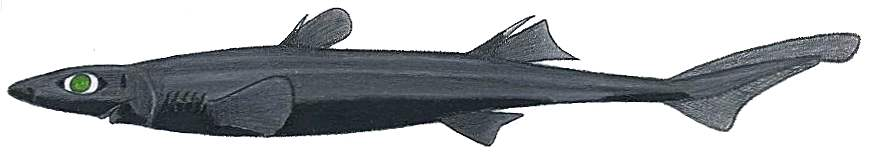
E. bullisi

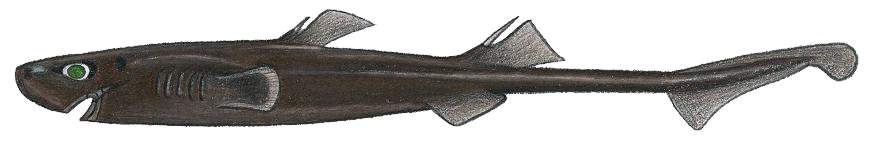
E. carteri

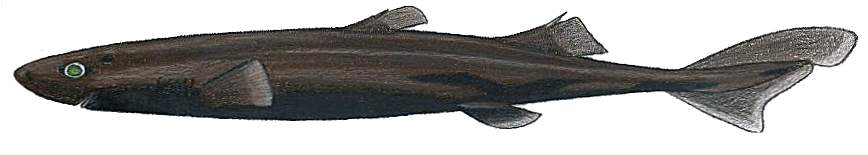
E. gracilispinis

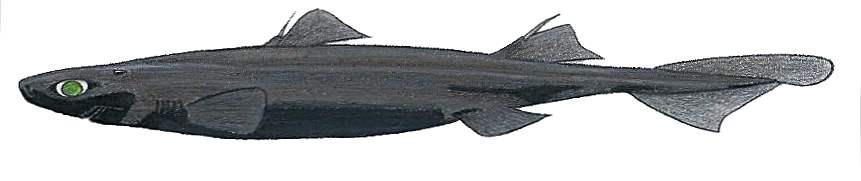
E. granulosus

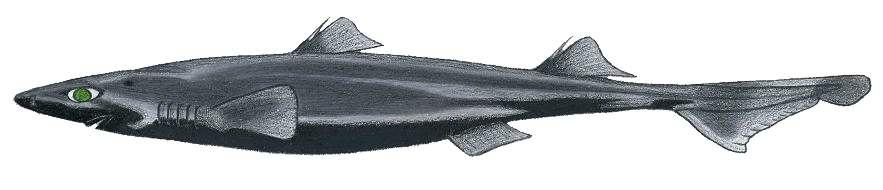
E. hillianus

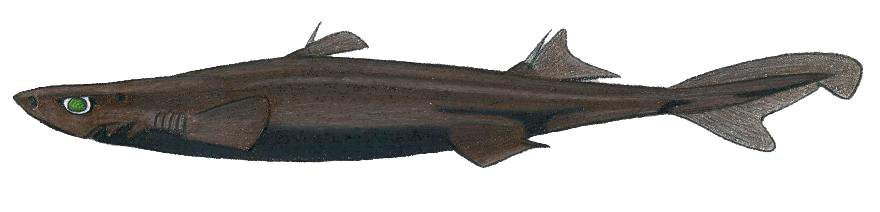
E. lucifer

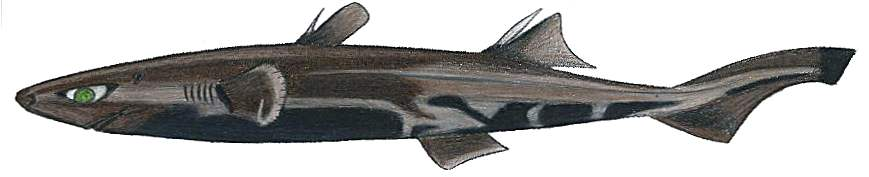
E. perryi

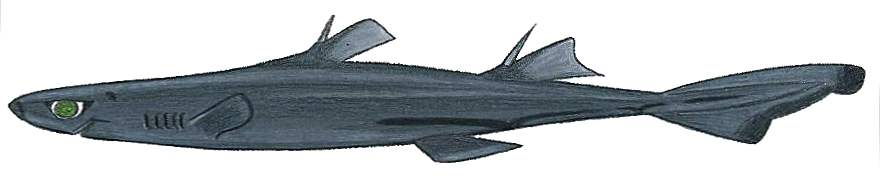
E. polli

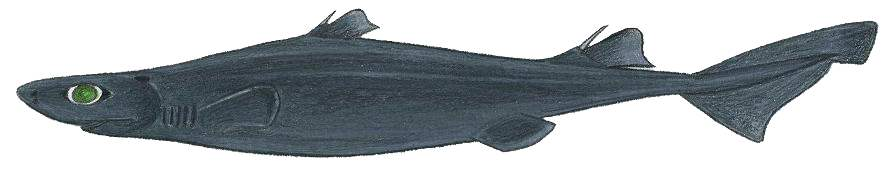
E. princeps

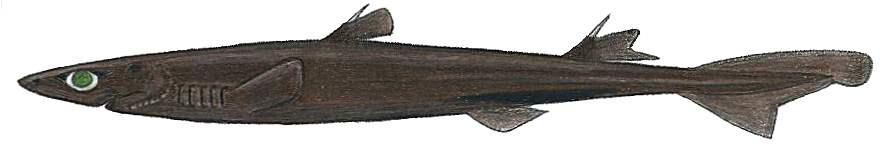
E. pusillus

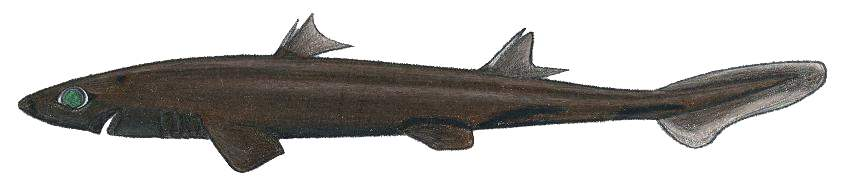
E. robinsi

There are currently 45 recognized species in this genus:

- Etmopterus alphus Ebert, Straube, Leslie & Weigmann, 2016 (whitecheek lanternshark)
- Etmopterus baxteri Garrick, 1957 (New Zealand lanternshark)
- Etmopterus benchleyi Vásquez, Ebert & D. J. Long, 2015 (ninja lanternshark)
- Etmopterus bigelowi Shirai & Tachikawa, 1993 (blurred lanternshark)
- Etmopterus brachyurus H. M. Smith & Radcliffe, 1912 (short-tail lanternshark)
- Etmopterus brosei Ebert, Leslie & Weigmann, 2021 (Barrie's lanternshark)
- Etmopterus bullisi Bigelow & Schroeder, 1957 (lined lanternshark)
- Etmopterus burgessi Schaaf-Da Silva & Ebert, 2006 (broadsnout lanternshark)
- Etmopterus carteri S. Springer & G. H. Burgess, 1985 (cylindrical lanternshark)
- Etmopterus caudistigmus Last, G. H. Burgess & Séret, 2002 (tail-spot lanternshark)
- Etmopterus compagnoi R. Fricke & Koch, 1990 (Compagno's lanternshark)
- Etmopterus decacuspidatus W. L. Y. Chan, 1966 (comb-tooth lanternshark)
- Etmopterus dianthus Last, G. H. Burgess & Séret, 2002 (pink lanternshark)
- Etmopterus dislineatus Last, G. H. Burgess & Séret, 2002 (lined lanternshark)
- Etmopterus evansi Last, G. H. Burgess & Séret, 2002 (black-mouth lanternshark)
- Etmopterus fusus Last, G. H. Burgess & Séret, 2002 (pygmy lanternshark)
- Etmopterus gracilispinis G. Krefft, 1968 (broad-banded lanternshark)
- Etmopterus granulosus (Günther, 1880) (southern lanternshark)
- Etmopterus hillianus (Poey, 1861) (Caribbean lanternshark)
- Etmopterus joungi Knuckey, Ebert & G. H. Burgess, 2011 (short-fin smooth lanternshark)
- Etmopterus lailae Ebert, Papastamatiou, Kajiura & Wetherbee, 2017 (Laila's lanternshark)
- Etmopterus litvinovi Parin & Kotlyar, 1990 (small-eye lanternshark)
- Etmopterus lucifer D. S. Jordan & Snyder, 1902 (black-belly lanternshark)
- Etmopterus marshae Ebert & Van Hees (Marsha's lanternshark)
- Etmopterus molleri (Whitley, 1939) (Moller's lanternshark or also Slendertail lanternshark)
- Etmopterus perryi S. Springer & G. H. Burgess, 1985 (dwarf lanternshark)
- Etmopterus polli Bigelow, Schroeder & S. Springer, 1953 (African lanternshark)
- Etmopterus princeps Collett, 1904 (great lanternshark)
- Etmopterus pseudosqualiolus Last, G. H. Burgess & Séret, 2002 (false lanternshark)
- Etmopterus pusillus (R. T. Lowe, 1839) (smooth lanternshark)
- Etmopterus pycnolepis Kotlyar, 1990 (dense-scale lanternshark)
- Etmopterus robinsi Schofield & G. H. Burgess, 1997 (West Indian lanternshark)
- Etmopterus samadiae W. T. White, Ebert, Mana & Corrigan, 2017 (Papuan lanternshark)
- Etmopterus schultzi Bigelow, Schroeder & S. Springer, 1953 (fringe-fin lanternshark)
- Etmopterus sculptus Ebert, Compagno & De Vries, 2011 (sculpted lanternshark)
- Etmopterus sentosus Bass, D'Aubrey & Kistnasamy, 1976 (thorny lanternshark)
- Etmopterus sheikoi (Dolganov, 1986) (rasp-tooth dogfish)
- Etmopterus spinax (Linnaeus, 1758) (velvet-belly lanternshark)
- Etmopterus splendidus Ka. Yano, 1988 (splendid lanternshark)
- Etmopterus unicolor (Engelhardt, 1912) (bristled lanternshark)
- Etmopterus viator Straube, 2011 (traveller lanternshark)
- Etmopterus villosus C. H. Gilbert, 1905 (Hawaiian lanternshark)
- Etmopterus virens Bigelow, Schroeder & S. Springer, 1953 (green lanternshark)
- Etmopterus westraliensis Ng, White, Liu & Joung 2025 (west Australian lanternshark)

=== Extinct species ===
There are at least two extinct species found in Etmopterus.

- †Etmopterus acutidens Casier 1966
- †Etmopterus cahuzaci Adnet 2006

== See also ==
- List of prehistoric cartilaginous fish
