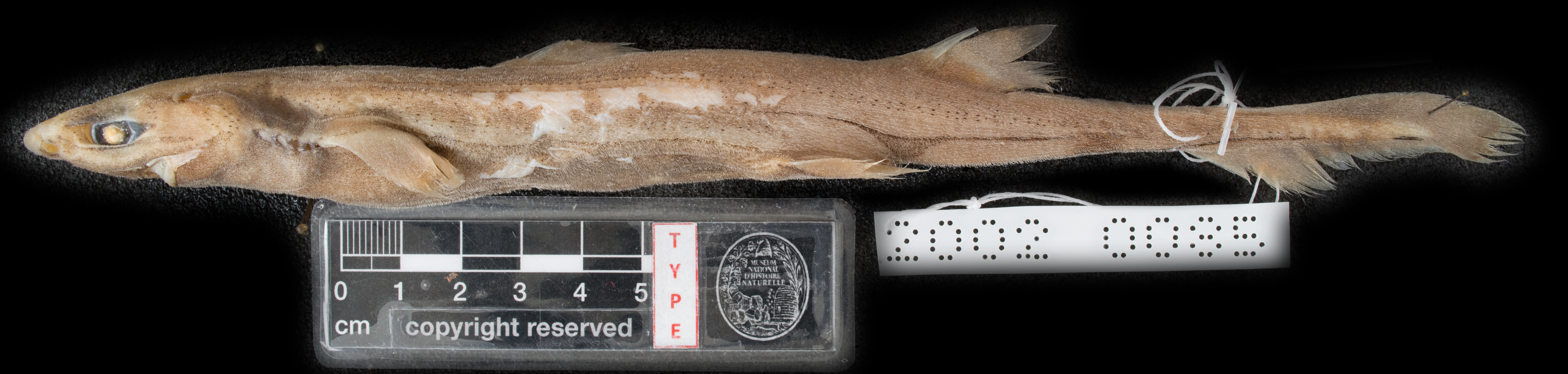

Conservation status
- Least Concern (IUCN 3.1)

Scientific classification
- Kingdom: Animalia
- Phylum: Chordata
- Class: Chondrichthyes
- Subclass: Elasmobranchii
- Division: Selachii
- Order: Squaliformes
- Family: Etmopteridae
- Genus: Etmopterus
- Species: E. evansi

Binomial name
- Etmopterus evansi Last, G. H. Burgess & Séret, 2002
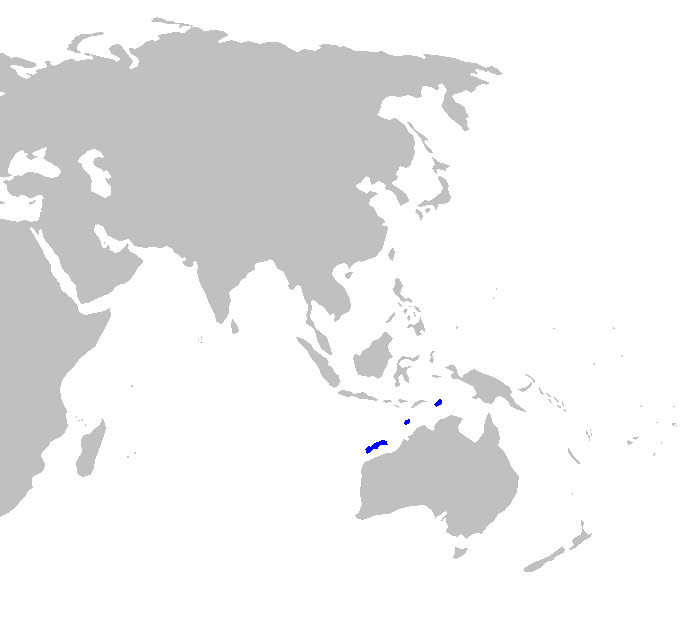
- Range of the blackmouth lanternshark (in blue)

= Blackmouth lanternshark =

Species of shark

The blackmouth lanternshark is a species of dogfish shark within the family Etmopteridae. This species is part of a subgroup that includes one other species from within the family. It is known to inhabit the benthic zones of the Eastern Indian Ocean and the Arafura Sea. These sharks were first described in a 2002 issue of Cybium, and there is still much unknown about the species.

== Taxonomy and phylogeny ==
The blackmouth lanternshark belongs to a subgroup of the genus Etmopterus that also includes the lined lanternshark, Etmopterus dislineatus. The genus name can be broken down into its Greek roots: "ethmos" refers to the sharks' ethmoid bone in the skull and "pteron" refers to sharks' fins. The species name evansi comes from the Australian fishery scientist, David Evans, who has spent years studying specimens of the species.

== Distribution and habitat ==
Within the Indian ocean, the blackmouth lanternshark can be found in the continental slopes off the northwest coast of Western Australia. The species is also found in the continental slopes of the Arafura Sea south of the Tanimbar Islands in Indonesia. There are additional records of the species found off the coast of Papua New Guinea. Generally these lanternshark are found between 430 and 550 meters below sea level. More specifically, the sharks tend to inhabit shoals and reefs within these locations and depths. It is not known to have a preference for hard or soft substrate environments.

== Description ==
The Blackmouth lanternshark is known to reach 30 cm in length. Knowledge on the species general description is limited due to its recent discovery and the limited samples currently being studied. Females tend to be larger than males, and the males are known to be mature at roughly 26 cm long. The longest individual found was 32 cm.

These lanternsharks are fusiform and approximately cylindrical in shape with a soft trunk. Compared to other species within the genus, evansi's head and snout are relatively short and its nostrils are relatively small. The species has relatively large, narrow eyes. Its mouth is narrow and moderately arched with four sets of functional teeth. The upper jaw contains three of the fours sets with small teeth usually having five cusps, and the lower jaw contains the fourth set with interlocking blade-like teeth with one cusp. The gills of the Blackmouth lanternfish are relatively large, approximately oblique, and roughly all the same size. Individuals have two dorsal fins, one pectoral fin, one pelvic fin and one caudal fin. The first fin is low and small compared to the second, and the pectoral fin is also relatively small. The caudal peduncle is long and thin. The caudal fin is very short, usually roughly the same size as the head.

Blackmouth lanternsharks have a light gray/brown dorsal half and a significantly darker ventral half separated by fine black lines. Individuals have denticles covering most of their body. There are a few bare spots but for the most part the denticles are dense and thin throughout, and are arranged in imperfect longitudinal rows. There are well defined melanophores and luminescent markings throughout the sharks' bodies as well.

== Diet ==
The diet of the Blackmouth lanternshark has yet to be studied in depth but many species from the genus Etmopterus are known to feed on nekton such as krill, cephalopods, small crustaceans, and small teleost fish.

== Behavior and ecology ==
The blackmouth lanternshark is ovoviviparous. The eggs are hatched within the female's uterus and sustained on a yolk sac until they are ready to hatch. The gestation period varies for many other species of Etmopterus but is generally longer than other sharks. These sharks require two reproductive seasons for one full reproductive cycle: one for reproductive organ development and gamete production and one for embryological development. Females within the Etmopterus genus produce anywhere from 2 to 20 young in one reproductive cycle. The Blackmouth lanternshark's mating behavior includes distinct pairing and a courtship embrace.

The blackmouth lanternshark is recognized as Least Concern in terms of conservation status. It is not known to be threatened by human activity due to its habitat.
