= False lanternshark =

Conservation status
- Least Concern (IUCN 3.1)

Scientific classification
- Kingdom: Animalia
- Phylum: Chordata
- Class: Chondrichthyes
- Subclass: Elasmobranchii
- Division: Selachii
- Order: Squaliformes
- Family: Etmopteridae
- Genus: Etmopterus
- Species: E. pseudosqualiolus

Binomial name
- Etmopterus pseudosqualiolus Last, G. H. Burgess & Séret, 2002
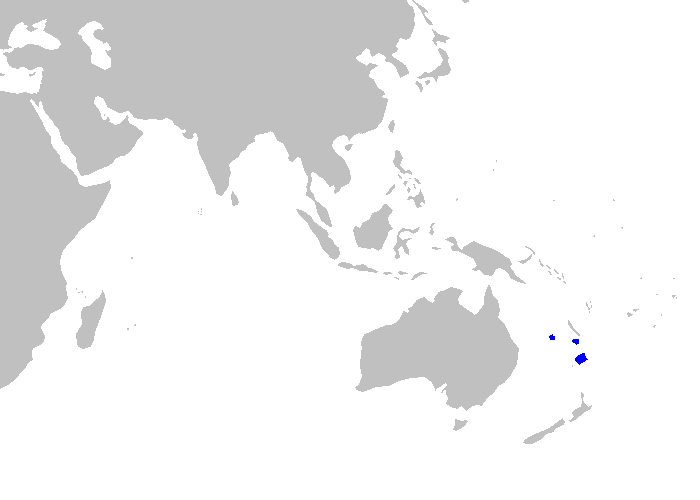
- Range of the false lanternshark (in blue)

Species of shark

The false lanternshark or false pygmy shark (Etmopterus pseudosqualiolus) is a shark of the family Etmopteridae found in the western Pacific from the Norfolk Ridge and Lord Howe Ridge off New Caledonia.
