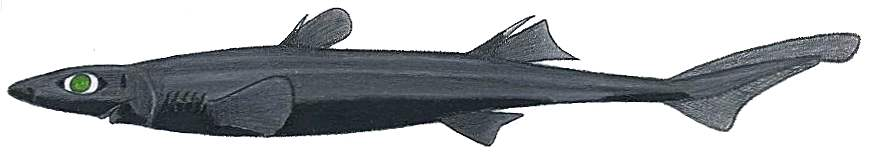

Conservation status
- Least Concern (IUCN 3.1)

Scientific classification
- Kingdom: Animalia
- Phylum: Chordata
- Class: Chondrichthyes
- Subclass: Elasmobranchii
- Division: Selachii
- Order: Squaliformes
- Family: Etmopteridae
- Genus: Etmopterus
- Species: E. bullisi

Binomial name
- Etmopterus bullisi (Bigelow & Schroeder, 1957)
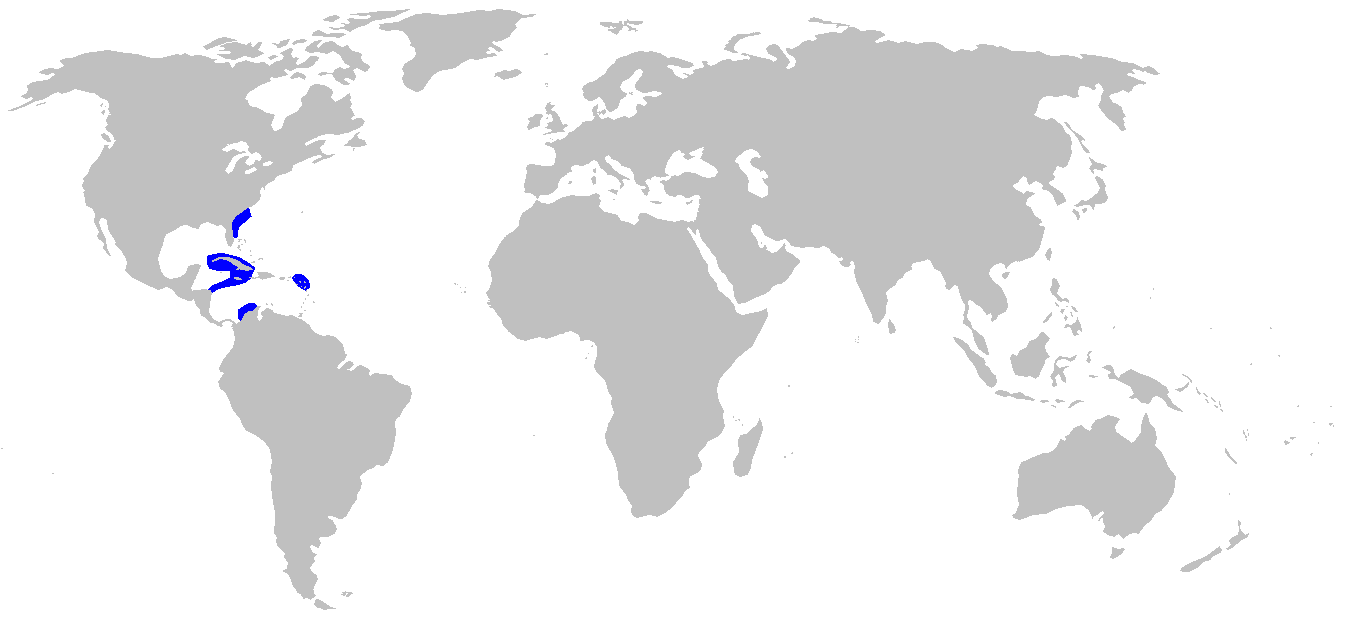
- Range of the lined lanternshark (in blue)

= Etmopterus bullisi =

Species of shark

Etmopterus bullisi, sometimes called the lined lanternshark, is a shark of the family Etmopteridae found in the western Atlantic from North Carolina to northern Florida, and Honduras, between latitudes 34°N and 15°N, at depths of up to 850 m (2,790 ft). Its maximum length is more than 26 cm (10 in), but an adult has yet to be measured.
