= Tailspot lanternshark =

Conservation status
- Least Concern (IUCN 3.1)

Scientific classification
- Kingdom: Animalia
- Phylum: Chordata
- Class: Chondrichthyes
- Subclass: Elasmobranchii
- Division: Selachii
- Order: Squaliformes
- Family: Etmopteridae
- Genus: Etmopterus
- Species: E. caudistigmus

Binomial name
- Etmopterus caudistigmus Last, G. H. Burgess & Séret, 2002
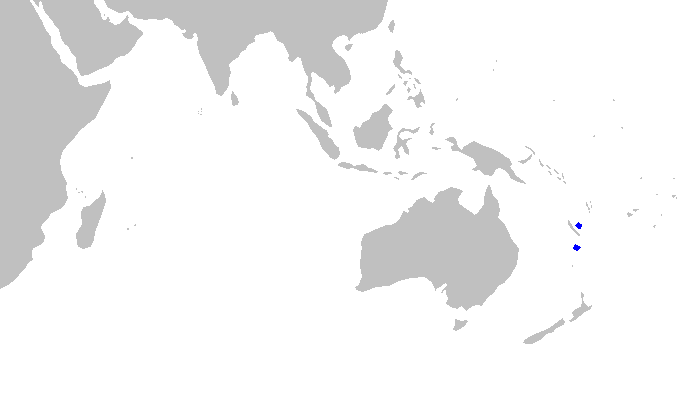
- Range of the tailspot lanternshark (in blue)

Species of shark

The tailspot lanternshark (Etmopterus caudistigmus) is a shark belonging to the family Etmopteridae and found around New Caledonia, at depths of between 640 and 800 m. Its length is up to 31 cm.

Reproduction is ovoviviparous.
