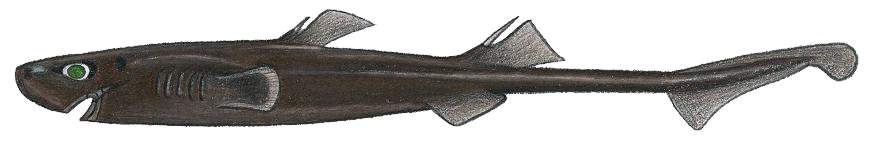

Conservation status
- Least Concern (IUCN 3.1)

Scientific classification
- Kingdom: Animalia
- Phylum: Chordata
- Class: Chondrichthyes
- Subclass: Elasmobranchii
- Division: Selachii
- Order: Squaliformes
- Family: Etmopteridae
- Genus: Etmopterus
- Species: E. carteri

Binomial name
- Etmopterus carteri (S. Springer & G. H. Burgess, 1985)
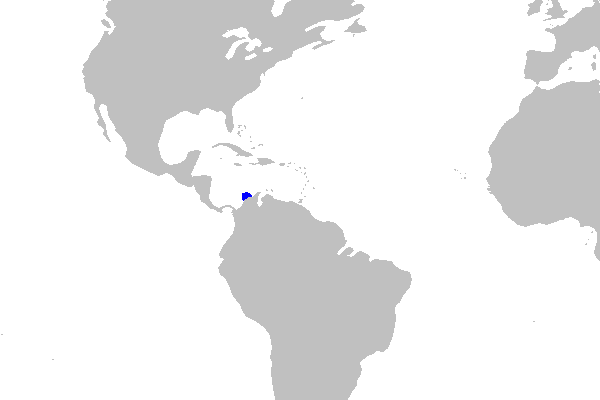
- Range of the cylindrical lanternshark (in blue)

= Cylindrical lanternshark =

Species of shark

The cylindrical lanternshark or Carter Gilbert's lanternshark (Etmopterus carteri) is a shark of the family Etmopteridae found along the Caribbean coast of Colombia in South America, at depths of between 285 and 355 m. Its maximum length is 21 cm.

Reproduction is presumed to be ovoviviparous, with three to 20 pups of 10 – 20 cm in length per litter.

== Etymology ==
The shark is named in honor of Carter R. Gilbert (1930-2022), of the Florida Museum of Natural History, because of his 1967 revision of the hammerhead sharks.
