= Etmopterus dislineatus =

Conservation status
- Least Concern (IUCN 3.1)

Scientific classification
- Kingdom: Animalia
- Phylum: Chordata
- Class: Chondrichthyes
- Subclass: Elasmobranchii
- Division: Selachii
- Order: Squaliformes
- Family: Etmopteridae
- Genus: Etmopterus
- Species: E. dislineatus

Binomial name
- Etmopterus dislineatus Last, G. H. Burgess & Séret, 2002
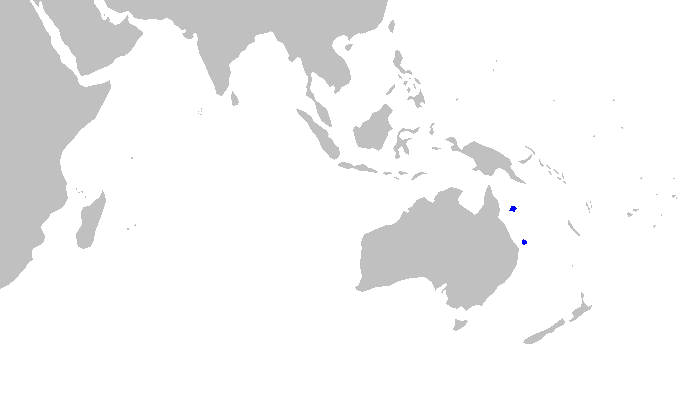
- Range of Etmopterus dislineatus (in blue)

Species of shark

Etmopterus dislineatus, sometimes called the lined lanternshark, is a shark of the family Etmopteridae found in the central Coral Sea at depths of between 590 and 800 m. Its length is up to 45 cm.

Reproduction is ovoviviparous.
