= Laila's lanternshark =

Conservation status
- Data Deficient (IUCN 3.1)

Scientific classification
- Kingdom: Animalia
- Phylum: Chordata
- Class: Chondrichthyes
- Subclass: Elasmobranchii
- Division: Selachii
- Order: Squaliformes
- Family: Etmopteridae
- Genus: Etmopterus
- Species: E. lailae

Binomial name
- Etmopterus lailae Ebert, Papastamatiou, Kajiura & Wetherbee, 2017
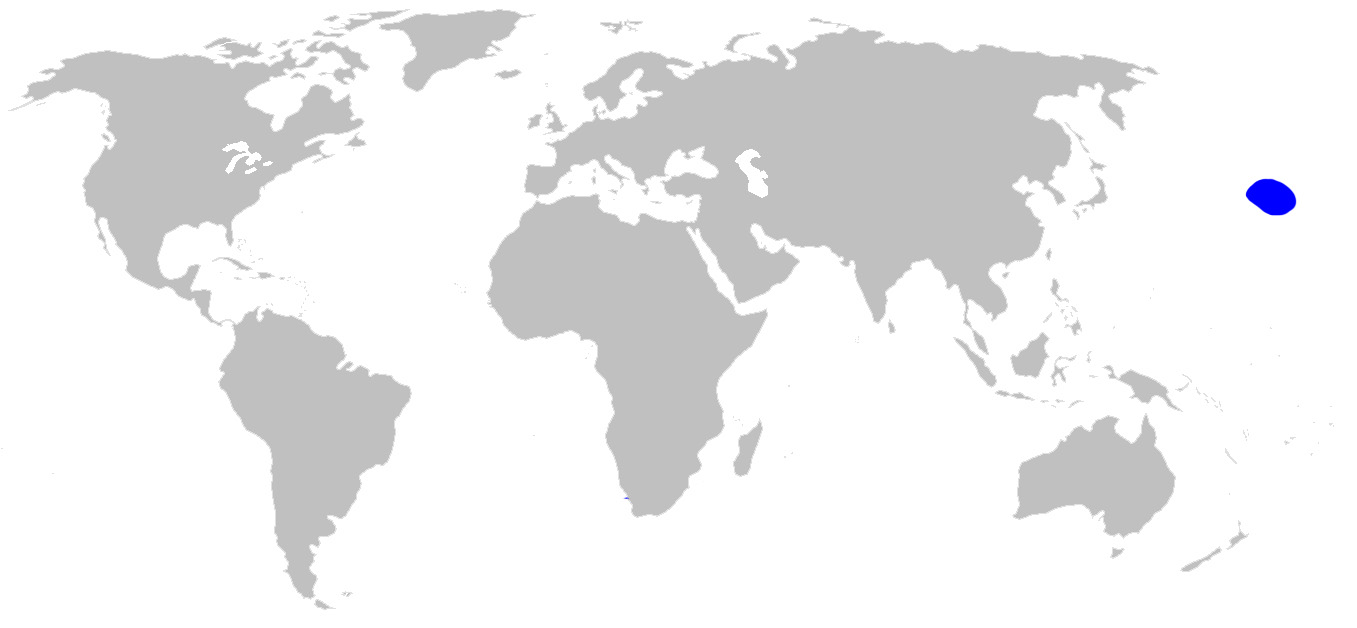
- Possible range of Laila's lanternshark

Species of lanternshark

Laila's lanternshark (Etmopterus lailae) is a species of lanternshark of the family Etmopteridae, found in the northwestern Hawaiian Islands (Koko and south Kanmu seamounts). It inhabits the seamounts at depths of 314–384 m (1,030–1,260 ft). This species resembles Blackbelly lanternshark in having linear rows of dermal denticles.

Compared to its congeners, Laila's lanternshark has several characteristics, including the number of precaudal vertebrates and spiral valve turns, the arrangement of dermal denticles on the ventral snout surface and body, the markings of caudal and flank, and a longer anterior flank marking branch.
