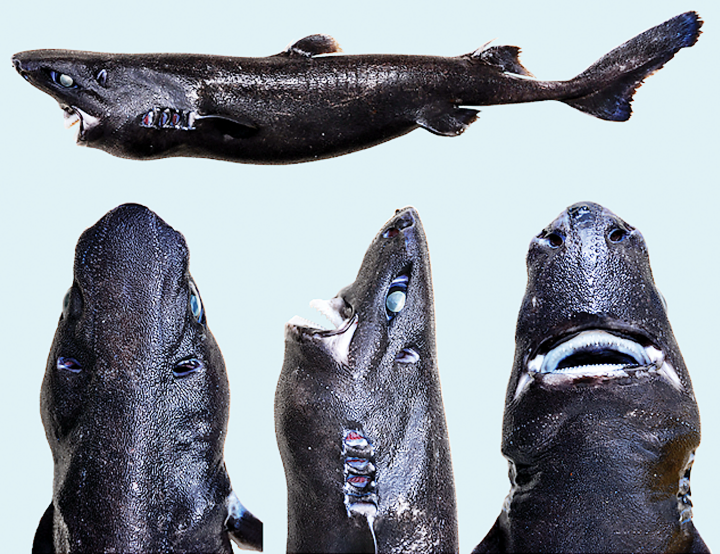

Conservation status
- Least Concern (IUCN 3.1)

Scientific classification
- Kingdom: Animalia
- Phylum: Chordata
- Class: Chondrichthyes
- Subclass: Elasmobranchii
- Division: Selachii
- Order: Squaliformes
- Family: Etmopteridae
- Genus: Etmopterus
- Species: E. benchleyi

Binomial name
- Etmopterus benchleyi V. E. Vásquez, Ebert & Long, 2015

= Ninja lanternshark =

Species of shark

The ninja lanternshark (Etmopterus benchleyi) is of the family Etmopteridae, found in the eastern Pacific Ocean from Nicaragua, south to Panama and Costa Rica. The depth range of collections is from 836 to 1443 meters along the continental slope. E. benchleyi is the only Etmopterus species presently known from the Pacific Coast of Central America.

== Type ==
The species was described from eight specimens collected off the Pacific Coast of Central America during an expedition of the Spanish research ship Miguel Oliver by D. Ross Robertson, a researcher at the Smithsonian Tropical Research Institute. One holotype and four paratypes were described and deposited with the United States National Museum of Natural History, Smithsonian Institution, Washington D.C.

== Anatomy and morphology ==
The ninja lanternshark is coloured black, with the mouth and eyes having white markings around them. The maximum length of male specimens collected during the Miguel Oliver voyages is 325 millimetres (12.8 in), while that of the female specimens is 515 millimetres (20.3 in). This species is distinct from other members of the E. spinax clade in having dense concentrations of dermal denticles closely surrounding the eyes and gill openings.

=== Features ===
This ninja lanternshark has a relatively short and conically shaped snout. The teeth in the upper jaw are small, straight and pointed, while the teeth in the lower jaw are larger. The first row of the upper jaw contains about 26-30 teeth, and the first row of the lower jaw contains about 30-36 teeth.

Its fins are small and rounded; the first and second dorsal fins are either of equal size or the first fin is slightly smaller than the second. A unique characteristic of this species is that it has dense concentrations of dermal denticles surrounding its eyes and gill slits.

=== Bioluminescence and diet ===
Because the ninja lanternshark is known to live at deep sea depths, it has a very dark coloration to blend in with the lack of light. Although the dark pigment can act as camouflage that helps hide from predators, it can also be useful when sneaking up on prey. This is because when ninja lanternsharks are feeding in shallower waters, their luminescent underside has the same appearance as the sunlight filtering down from above and camouflages them from potential predators below. However, when they are in the deep sea, their luminous appearance attracts smaller prey to them which consist of shrimp and other small fish and crustaceans.

== Origin of scientific name ==
The shark was identified by shark researcher Victoria Vásquez. When asking for advice on naming the shark at a family gathering, it was actually her younger cousin who named the shark, pointing out that “ninjas are awesome.” The specific name benchleyi derives from Peter Benchley, author of the 1974 novel Jaws that was used as a basis for Steven Spielberg's film of the same name.
