= Blue-eye lanternshark =

Conservation status
- Least Concern (IUCN 3.1)

Scientific classification
- Kingdom: Animalia
- Phylum: Chordata
- Class: Chondrichthyes
- Subclass: Elasmobranchii
- Division: Selachii
- Order: Squaliformes
- Family: Etmopteridae
- Genus: Etmopterus
- Species: E. viator

Binomial name
- Etmopterus viator Straube, 2011
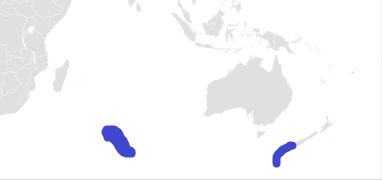
- Known range of Etmopterus viator (in blue)

Species of shark

The blue-eye lanternshark, also known as the traveller lanternshark or slate lanternshark (Etmopterus viator) is a shark of the family Etmopteridae.

== Distribution and habitat ==
It is found in the northern part of the Kerguelen Plateau in the Southern Ocean, off New Zealand and South Africa. It has been confirmed to be present at the Macquarie Ridge.

== Anatomy ==
It is a medium-sized Etmopterus species with a fusiform body.

== Conservation status ==
In June 2018 the New Zealand Department of Conservation classified the blue-eye lanternshark as "Data Deficient" under the New Zealand Threat Classification System.
