= Etmopterus burgessi =

Conservation status
- Least Concern (IUCN 3.1)

Scientific classification
- Kingdom: Animalia
- Phylum: Chordata
- Class: Chondrichthyes
- Subclass: Elasmobranchii
- Division: Selachii
- Order: Squaliformes
- Family: Etmopteridae
- Genus: Etmopterus
- Species: E. burgessi

Binomial name
- Etmopterus burgessi Schaaf-Da Silva & Ebert, 2006
- Known range of the Broad-snout lanternshark (in blue)

Species of shark

Etmopterus burgessi, sometimes known as the broad-snout lanternshark, is a lanternshark of the family Etmopteridae in the order Squaliformes. It is found only around Taiwan.

== Etymology ==
The shark is named in honor of George H. Burgess of the Florida Museum of Natural History, in thanks to his contributions to the systematics of Etmopterus.
