= Etmopterus westraliensis =

Scientific classification
- Kingdom: Animalia
- Phylum: Chordata
- Class: Chondrichthyes
- Subclass: Elasmobranchii
- Division: Selachii
- Order: Squaliformes
- Family: Etmopteridae
- Genus: Etmopterus
- Species: E. westraliensis

Binomial name
- Etmopterus westraliensis Ng, White, Liu & Joung 2025

Species of shark

Etmopterus westraliensis is a species of dogfish shark in the family Etmopteridae; commonly known as the West Australian lanternshark. It is known from six specimens collected in the Indian Ocean off of Western Australia, specifically the Ledge Point in the south to Exmouth in the north.

E. westraliensis lives at a depth of around 609 meters (2,000 ft), grows to 39 cm (1.3 ft), and is bioluminescent with photophores located on their belly and flanks.
