= Papuan lanternshark =

Conservation status
- Least Concern (IUCN 3.1)

Scientific classification
- Kingdom: Animalia
- Phylum: Chordata
- Class: Chondrichthyes
- Subclass: Elasmobranchii
- Division: Selachii
- Order: Squaliformes
- Family: Etmopteridae
- Genus: Etmopterus
- Species: E. samadiae

Binomial name
- Etmopterus samadiae White, Ebert, Mana & Corrigan, 2017

Species of shark

The Papuan lanternshark (Etmopterus samadiae) is a species of shark in the family Etmopteridae, found in areas of Papua New Guinea.

== Description ==
The Papuan lanternshark is small and slender, with males at 26 cm, and females at 28 cm in length. It can be recognized by its closest congeners. It also has a long caudal base marking, and marks in the shape of a dash. The teeth are different from the upper and lower jaw; the upper teeth are multicuspid, and have three functional series, while the teeth on the lower jaw are unicuspid in one series. The lower jaw has up to 35 teeth, while the upper jaw has only up to 33.

== Habitat and distribution ==
It is a bathypelagic species, found ranging from depths from 340 to 785 meters, in the Western Pacific.
