= Smalleye lanternshark =

Conservation status
- Least Concern (IUCN 3.1)

Scientific classification
- Kingdom: Animalia
- Phylum: Chordata
- Class: Chondrichthyes
- Subclass: Elasmobranchii
- Division: Selachii
- Order: Squaliformes
- Family: Etmopteridae
- Genus: Etmopterus
- Species: E. litvinovi

Binomial name
- Etmopterus litvinovi Parin & Kotlyar, 1990
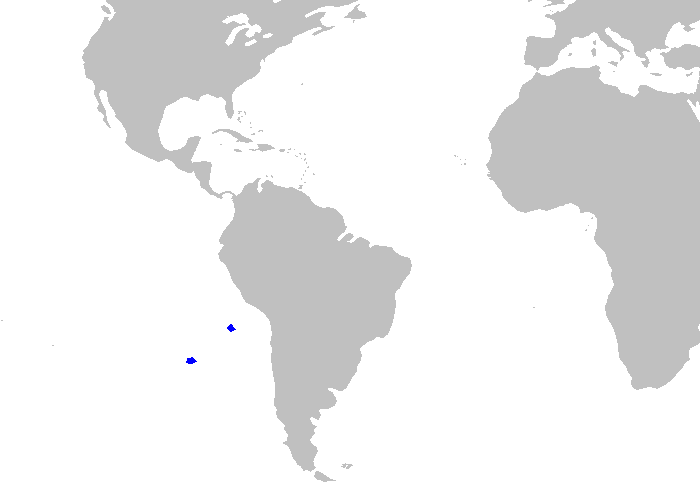
- Range of the smalleye lanternshark (in blue)

Species of shark

The smalleye lanternshark (Etmopterus litvinovi) is a shark of the family Etmopteridae found in the southeast Pacific off Peru and Chile, at depths between 630 and 1,100 m (2,070 and 3,610 ft). Its length is up to 61 cm (24 in).

Reproduction is ovoviviparous.

The shark appears to be endemic to two areas. The Nazca ridge and the Sala y Gomez ridge.
