= Marsha's lanternshark =

Conservation status
- Least Concern (IUCN 3.1)

Scientific classification
- Kingdom: Animalia
- Phylum: Chordata
- Class: Chondrichthyes
- Subclass: Elasmobranchii
- Division: Selachii
- Order: Squaliformes
- Family: Etmopteridae
- Genus: Etmopterus
- Species: E. marshae

Binomial name
- Etmopterus marshae Ebert, Van & Hees, 2018

Species of shark

Marsha's lanternshark (Etmopterus marshae) is a species of shark in the family Etmopteridae. It is found in the Western Pacific near the Philippines and can reach 23.4 cm in length.

== Description ==
Males reach a length of up to 23.4 cm, while females reach 19.2 cm. The species is slender and has a whitish and purplish body colouration. Between the pectoral and pelvic fins and the upper caudal fins are markings with a dark and light banding pattern.

== Distribution and habitat ==
The species occurs in a small area between Taiwan and the Philippines, near the Batanes. It inhabits marine waters from 322 to 337 meters deep over a sandy bottom.
