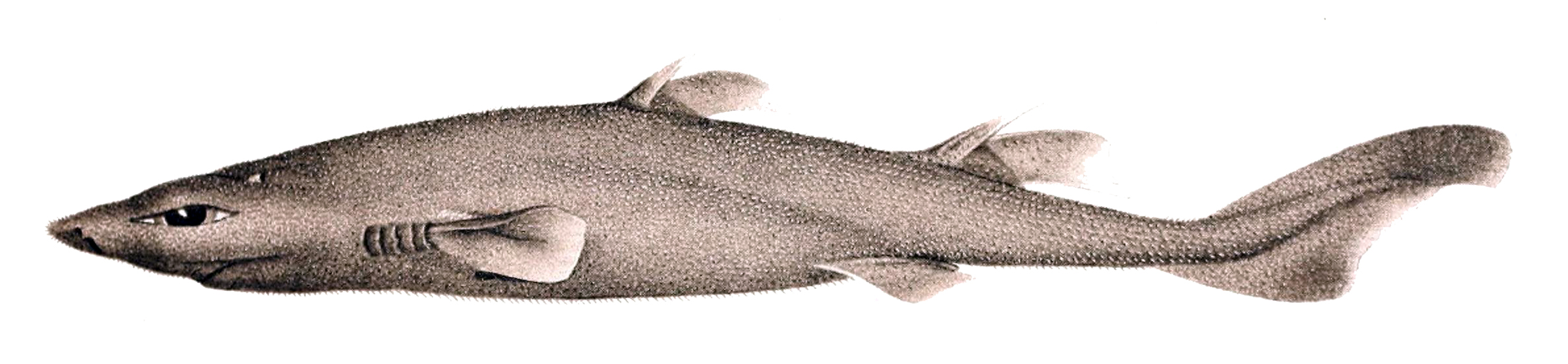

Conservation status
- Least Concern (IUCN 3.1)

Scientific classification
- Kingdom: Animalia
- Phylum: Chordata
- Class: Chondrichthyes
- Subclass: Elasmobranchii
- Division: Selachii
- Order: Squaliformes
- Family: Etmopteridae
- Genus: Etmopterus
- Species: E. villosus

Binomial name
- Etmopterus villosus C. H. Gilbert, 1905
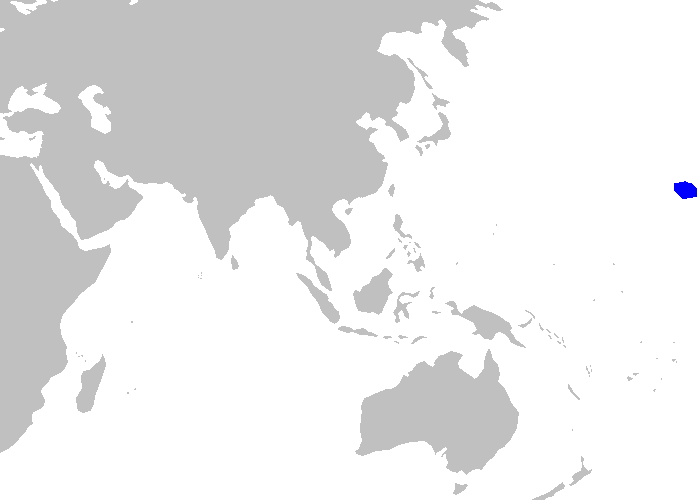
- Range of the Hawaiian lanternshark (in blue)

= Hawaiian lanternshark =

Species of shark

The Hawaiian Lanternshark (Etmopterus villosus) is a species of small squaliform shark in the family Etmopteridae.

== Description ==
This type of Etmopteridae have a small but sturdy body. Research has found that females will reach to about 652 mm (25.7 in) in length, while males will reach about 624 mm (24.6 in) in length. The Hawaiian lantern shark has a muted color range consisting of browns and blacks on its upper half of its body. While the lower part are more consistent with a darker tonal range. A couple of noticeable characteristics for this organism is upon the area above the pelvic fin there is a black mark, there gills are about 6.25 mm (0.246 in) long. Another couple of noticeable characteristics is the second dorsal fin. It is larger than the first frontal fin, but the length is almost half the size of the other. Another noticeable characteristic unique to the lanternshark is that the spine has a slight curve to it instead of being straight.

== Distribution ==
These organisms can be found in the Hawaiian Islands arounds depths of 1.61 km (1.00 mi). Some can be located more along the further of the Hawaiian island chain to the north. Researchers have found specimens near the Koko seamount and South Kanmu seamounts.

== Human interaction and preservation ==
Due to such depths that these creature live at, the interaction with human is sparse. The only rare occasion that humans end up encountering such deep sea sharks is the use of deep sea nets that impeach upon the sharks depth. This also makes it not in the endangered species list.
