= Whitecheek lanternshark =

Conservation status
- Least Concern (IUCN 3.1)

Scientific classification
- Kingdom: Animalia
- Phylum: Chordata
- Class: Chondrichthyes
- Subclass: Elasmobranchii
- Division: Selachii
- Order: Squaliformes
- Family: Etmopteridae
- Genus: Etmopterus
- Species: E. alphus

Binomial name
- Etmopterus alphus Ebert, Straube, Leslie & Weigmann, 2016

Species of shark

The whitecheek lanternshark (Etmopterus alphus) is a shark of the family Etmopteridae found in the western Indian Ocean.
