= Rasptooth dogfish =

Conservation status
- Least Concern (IUCN 3.1)

Scientific classification
- Kingdom: Animalia
- Phylum: Chordata
- Class: Chondrichthyes
- Subclass: Elasmobranchii
- Division: Selachii
- Order: Squaliformes
- Family: Etmopteridae
- Genus: Etmopterus
- Species: E. sheikoi

Binomial name
- Etmopterus sheikoi (Dolganov, 1986)
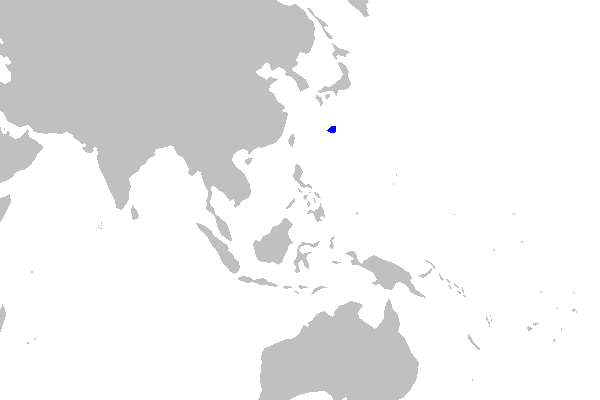
- Range of the rasptooth dogfish (in blue)

Synonyms
- Centroscyllium sheikoi Dolganov, 1986; Miroscyllium sheikoi Dolganov, 1986

Species of shark

The rasptooth dogfish (Etmopterus sheikoi) is a dogfish, found on the Kyushu–Palau Ridge in the northwest Pacific Ocean at depths of 360 m. Its maximum length is unknown. This species was originally described as Centroscyllium sheikoi, and subsequently allocated to the newly named genus Miroscyllium based on anatomical features not shared with other Centroscyllium. More recent molecular data suggest this species belongs to the genus Etmopterus, but as of June 2014 Miroscyllium sheikoi remains the valid name recognized by FishBase, the Catalog of Fishes World Register of Marine Species, and the IUCN

Extinct Miroscyllium

The genus name Miroscyllium was proposed in 1990 to encompass a single living species (now E. sheikoi) and in 2006 was expanded to include fossil teeth of an extinct species (originally described as "?Centroscyllium sp." in 1972) recovered from the Miocene (23.03–5.332 Ma) strata in Vaucluse, southwestern France. The teeth of Miroscyllium (sensu lato) are similar to those of Etmopterus, but differ in having multiple cusps on the tooth crowns ("multicuspidate crowns").
