= Sculpted lanternshark =

Conservation status
- Least Concern (IUCN 3.1)

Scientific classification
- Kingdom: Animalia
- Phylum: Chordata
- Class: Chondrichthyes
- Subclass: Elasmobranchii
- Division: Selachii
- Order: Squaliformes
- Family: Etmopteridae
- Genus: Etmopterus
- Species: E. sculptus

Binomial name
- Etmopterus sculptus Ebert, Compagno & De Vries, 2011
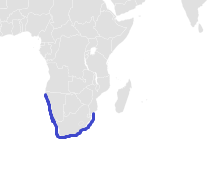
- Known range of the sculpted lanternshark (in blue)

Species of shark

The sculpted lanternshark (Etmopterus sculptus) is a shark of the family Etmopteridae found from the Southeast Atlantic and Southwest Indian Ocean, specifically from Namibia to southern Mozambique and the Madagascar Ridge. Etmopterus sculptus is a moderately large species of Etmopterus.
