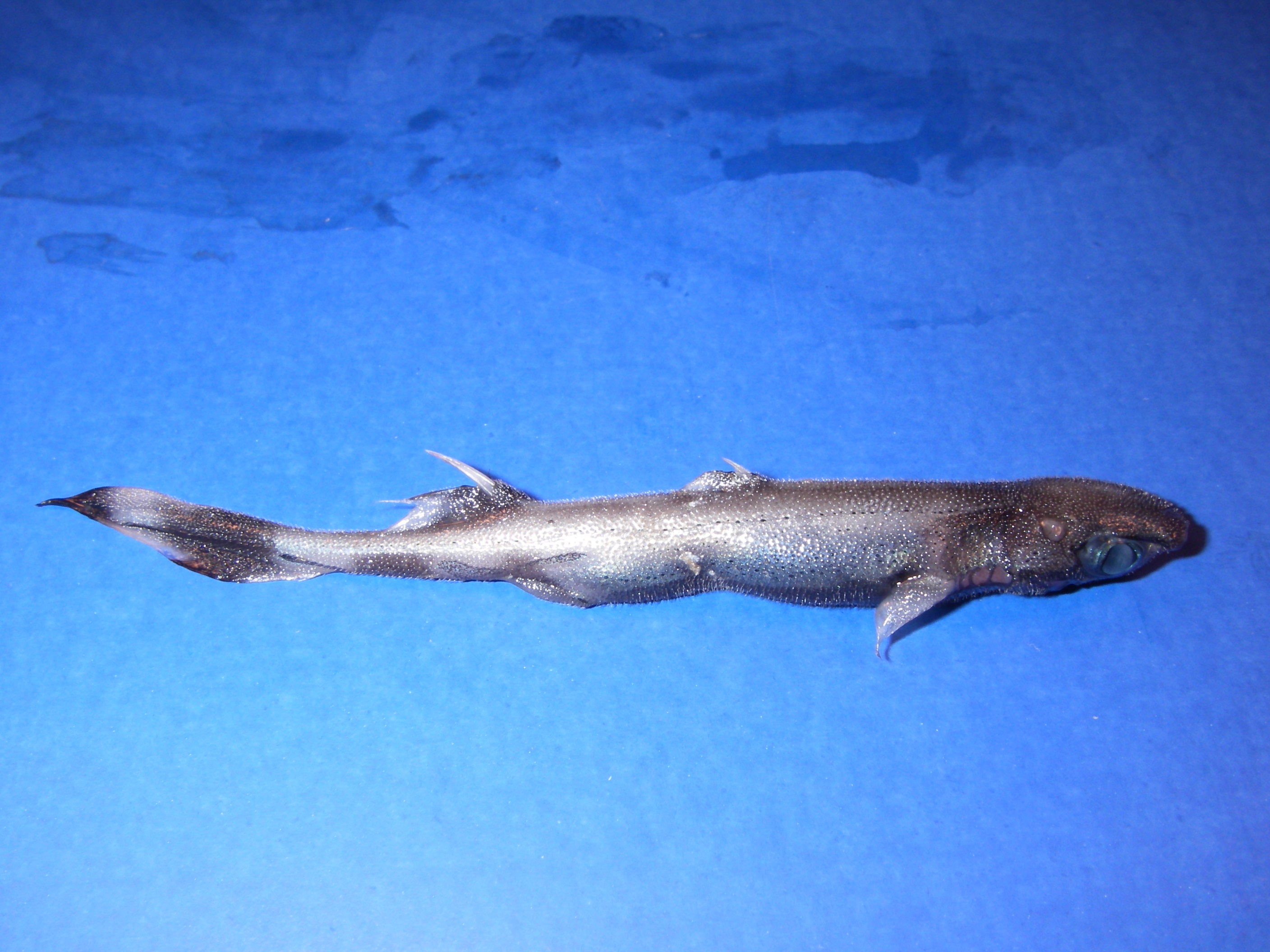

Conservation status
- Least Concern (IUCN 3.1)

Scientific classification
- Kingdom: Animalia
- Phylum: Chordata
- Class: Chondrichthyes
- Subclass: Elasmobranchii
- Division: Selachii
- Order: Squaliformes
- Family: Etmopteridae
- Genus: Etmopterus
- Species: E. schultzi

Binomial name
- Etmopterus schultzi (Bigelow, Schroeder & S. Springer, 1953)
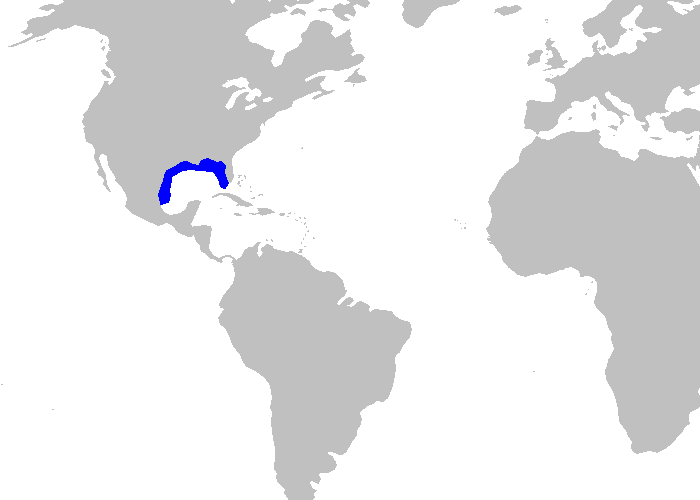
- Range of the fringefin lanternshark (in blue)

= Fringefin lanternshark =

Species of shark

The fringefin lanternshark (Etmopterus schultzi) is a shark of the family Etmopteridae found in the western central Atlantic from Texas to Florida, northern Gulf of Mexico, and Mexico. It is endemic to this area. It is a deep water shark and is found about 220 to 915 meters below the surface, on the upper continental slopes of the Gulf. E. schultzi is a small shark, about 27–30 cm long and feeds on squid. It is also bioluminescent, which counter-illuminates it and helps with intraspecific interaction. Due to its limited range and the difficulty of collecting deep water species, it has not been evaluated by the IUCN Red List, but due to recent oil spills in the Gulf of Mexico, it is likely that fringefin lanternsharks have decreased in population.

== Taxonomy ==
The fringefin lanternshark was first identified in 1953 by H.B. Bigelow, W. C. Schroeder, and S. Springer in the Bulletin of the Museum of Comparative Zoology at Harvard College. Etmopteridae is a family commonly known as lanternsharks because the photophores on their ventral side produce light, making them bioluminescent. The family Etmopteridae is split into 5 genera; the largest of these genera is Etmopterus, of which there are 41 species, including the fringefin lanternshark.

Fringefin lanternsharks are named for the distinct fringing created by ceratotrichia on the edge of their fins. Ceratotrichia are the fibers that support fish fins.

== Distribution and habitat ==
E. shultzi lives at a depth of about 220 to 915 meters below the surface, predominantly on the upper continental slopes of the Gulf of Mexico. It is endemic to the Gulf, and its range extends from the continental slopes of Eastern Mexico, Southern United States, and Western Florida.

== Description ==
E. schultzi males are about 27 cm long, while females are 28–30 cm long. The upper part of their bodies is light brown and their bellies are dusky grey. They have a dark mark behind and above the pelvic fins at the base of their tail. The edges of their fins are given their characteristic fringed appearance by naked ceratotrichia, the filaments that run through fish fins. Their denticles are hooked and mostly cover the snout. Their gill openings are short and their second dorsal fin, the fin located closer to the tail, is about twice the size of the first dorsal fin, which is located closer to the head. Like all shark species, they have heterocercal caudal fins, where the upper part is longer than the lower.

== Biology ==
=== Feeding ===
E. schultzi is known to feed on squid. It has also been suggested that these lanternsharks school in order to hunt food, but very little research has been done on their feeding behaviors and methods.

=== Life history ===
Fringefin lanternsharks likely use the species-specific bioluminescent patterns on their ventral side to find mates.

Although fringefin lanternshark reproduction has not been directly studied, due to their close association with other lanternshark species, fringefin lanternsharks are presumably ovoviviparous. Ovoviviparity is a method of reproduction in which there is internal fertilization and the developing young feed on the egg yolk. The mother then gives birth to live, fully developed young. This method is different from viviparous species like mammals because in mammals the developing young are connected to the mother via a placenta and receive nutrients directly from her.

=== Bioluminescence ===
Etmopteridae sharks are bioluminescent and produce from their ventral side. Unlike many bioluminescent marine organisms, Etmopteridae bioluminescence does not come from symbiotic relationships with bioluminescent bacteria, but from their own light-producing organs called photophores. The ventral side of the sharks contains many photophores. Each photophore contains several light-producing vesicles called photocytes and photophores also have an iris-like structure that may allow sharks to control the level of light they produce.

Bioluminescence is used in counter-illumination and intraspecific social interactions. Without photophores, the underside of the sharks would be darker than the surface of the ocean above them, which would allow other organisms swimming underneath them to see the sharks' outline clearly. The photophores lighten the underside of the sharks, reducing the contrast between the shark and the ocean surface. This counter-illumination allows them to hunt prey more effectively and protects them from being seen by potential predators.

Bioluminescence is used in social interaction because the placement of the photophores creates patters on the sharks. These patterns are specific to each Etmopteridae species, so it allows sharks to recognize members of the same species from far away (a maximum range of 700 meters was found). This is necessary when schooling together or finding a mate as the low levels of light would otherwise make locating each other extremely difficult.

== Human interactions ==
Fringefin lanternsharks have no importance to fisheries, but are sometimes bycatch of deepwater trawls.

While no study has been done to determine the population status of E. shultzi specifically, there is evidence that the species has been negatively affected by the 2010 oil spill in the Gulf of Mexico. A large area of fringefin lanternshark range overlapped with the area of the oil spill, but the species was not studied enough to accurately determine the effect of the oil spill on fringefin lanternshark population.
