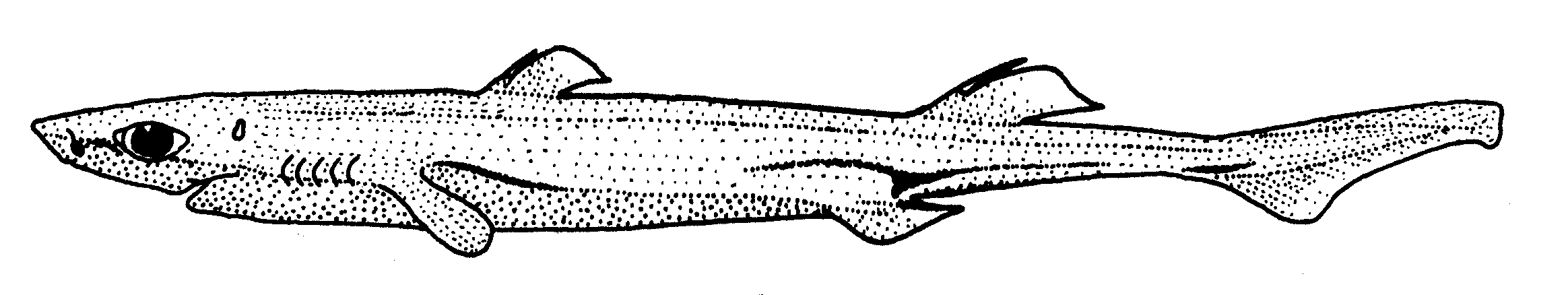
- Drawing by Dr Tony Ayling

Conservation status
- Least Concern (IUCN 3.1)

Scientific classification
- Kingdom: Animalia
- Phylum: Chordata
- Class: Chondrichthyes
- Subclass: Elasmobranchii
- Division: Selachii
- Order: Squaliformes
- Family: Etmopteridae
- Genus: Etmopterus
- Species: E. lucifer

Binomial name
- Etmopterus lucifer D. S. Jordan & Snyder, 1902
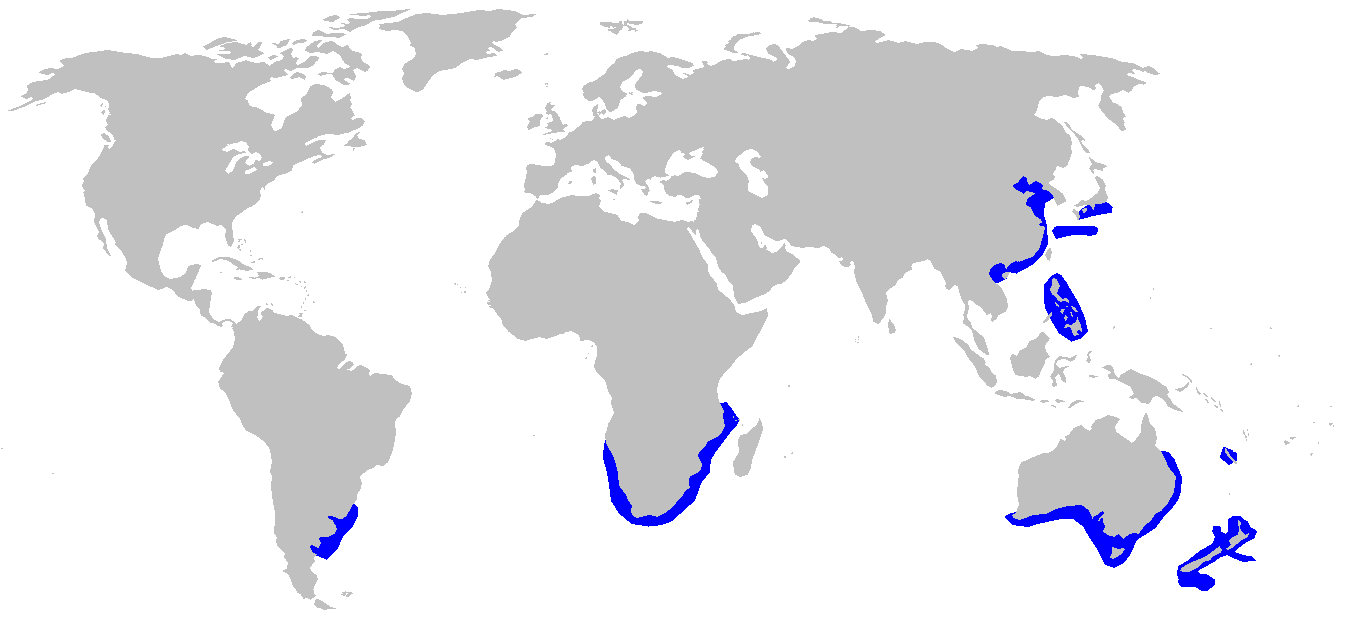
- Range of the blackbelly lanternshark (in blue)

= Blackbelly lanternshark =

Species of shark

The blackbelly lanternshark or lucifer shark (Etmopterus lucifer) is a shark of the family Etmopteridae found around the world in tropical and temperate seas at depths between 150 and 1,250 meters – the mesopelagic zone. Compared to other mesopelagic fish predators and invertebrates, the blackbelly lanternshark is thought to reside in shallower, more southern waters. E. lucifer can reach up to 47 centimeters in length and consumes mesopelagic cephalopods, fish, and crustaceans. Blackbelly lanternsharks are bioluminescent, using hormone controlled mechanisms to emit light through ventral photogenic organs called photophores and are presumed to be ovoviviparous. The blackbelly lanternshark has been classified as "Not Threatened" within the New Zealand Threat Classification System.

== Distribution and habitat ==
Etmopterus lucifer is prevalent in New Zealand's deep waters, most commonly found on the south Chatham Rise, with the greatest occurrence recorded at around 500 meters in depth. E. lucifer is categorized as a mesopelagic fish, preferring shallower and more southern habitats. Between 1992 and 2010, a significant increase in E. lucifer biomass was observed along the east coast of the North Island. In New Zealand's deep-sea trawl fisheries, Etmopterus lucifer, alongside the Etmopterus granulosus, constitutes the predominant by-catch species.

== Taxonomy ==
Etmopterus lucifer was first discovered and scientifically documented by David Starr Jordan & John Otterbein Snyder in 1902 off the east coast of Honshu, Japan. It is a member of the family Etmopteridae which is in the order Squaliformes.

- Additional phylogenetic information can be found here

== Anatomy and morphology ==
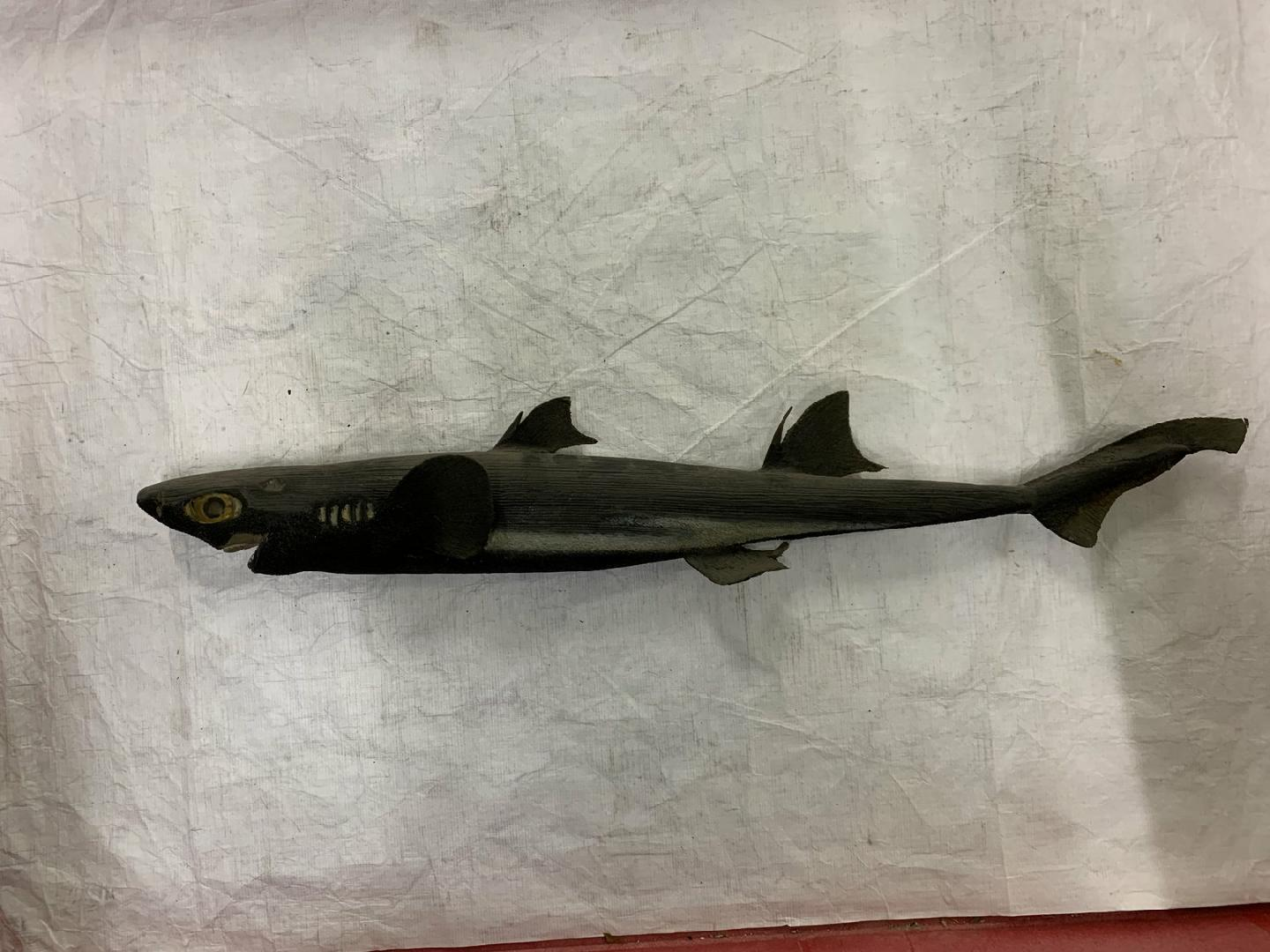
Specimen of Etmopterus lucifer Jordan & Snyder, 1902 - The Trustees of the Natural History Museum, London, United Kingdom

Etmopterus lucifer has a slender body with brown coloration on the top and black coloration on the bottom. E. lucifer is shown to have a higher amount of pores – associated with sensory ampullae of Lorenzini – on its ventral side than dorsal side, meaning the species likely closes in on prey from above. Black markings are also featured around the pelvic, or ventral, fins and at the base of the caudal, or tail, fin. The blackbelly lanternshark has two dorsal fins, the second of which is larger, and a caudal, or tail, fin, which is relatively long. The interdorsal space is short. E. lucifer has relatively long gills, as well as five branchial arches. Along the side of the body, from its snout to its tail fin, are rows of hook-shaped denticles. The lower jaw contains between 29 and 39 teeth that have one cusp, while the upper jaw contains between 21 and 26 teeth that have up to three cusps. Teeth are around 2 mm in length.

The maximum length of E. lucifer is about 47 cm. Males range from 29 to 42 cm, while females are 34 cm or more in length.

Etmopterus lucifer has a wide and protruding rostrum, with large nasal capsules and rostral fenestrae. As a deep-sea species, E. lucifer has a large eye diameter, which can result in higher sensitivity to penetrating light and bioluminescence. A translucent region in the upper eye orbit of E. lucifer can potentially help the species detect camouflage. E. lucifer has high rod density in the nasal area of the eye, that allow the species to detect bioluminescent markings of other individuals and adjust to low-light conditions.

=== Bioluminescence ===
Three families of shark are known to contain bioluminescent species including Etmopteridae, Dalatiidae, and Somniosidae with recent research suggesting that the evolution of bioluminescence in sharks occurred once. Like all bioluminescent sharks, blackbelly lanternsharks are covered in small photogenic organs called photophores. A photophore is composed of photocytes, the cells where bioluminescent reactions take place, arranged in a cup shaped sheath and covered with lens cells. An iris-like structure (ILS) is located underneath the lens of the photophore and can open and close to release light. Photophores are located across the body of E. lucifer in distinct arrangements, but are found in much higher density on the ventral side of the shark where they are oriented downward. E. lucifer also displays photophores in clade specific lateral markings as well as along its pectoral fins and claspers.

Because of the ventral arrangement of light emitting organs on the body of E. lucifer and other bioluminescent sharks, researchers have hypothesized that bioluminescence evolved as a form of cryptic coloration, allowing blackbelly lanternsharks to blend into the residual downwelling sunlight of their midwater environment when viewed from below. This form of camouflage protects sharks from predators at deeper depths. Research with a related species of shark, Etmopterus spinax, has shown that Etmopteridae do not significantly alter the intensity of their luminescence and suggests that lanternsharks engage in daily vertical migration to follow an iso-lume. Due to lateral bioluminescent markings on the blackbelly lanternshark forming a narrow stripe along the side of the organism that could be recognizable to predators, it has been suggested that this species experiences a more relaxed threat of predation. Instead, researchers have hypothesized that because these markings are distinct to the E. lucifer clade, they might aid in recognition and communication between conspecifics, and be a form of bioluminescent signaling.

Bioluminescence in blackbelly lanternsharks and other Etmopteridae sharks has been found to be controllable through manipulation of hormones including melatonin (MT), α-melanocyte-stimulating hormone (α-MSH), and adrenocorticotropic hormone (ACTH). MT was found to induce light emission in the photophores of E. lucifer, a process that simultaneously occurred with the opening of the iris-like structure (ILS) leading researchers to conclude that both the bioluminescent chemical reaction occurring in photocytes and the ILS appear to be involved in the control of light emissions. α-MSH and ACTH were both found to decrease light emissions in the photophores of E. lucifer. Additional information on the biochemical mechanism for bioluminescence in sharks is still being researched. Studies have attempted to link bioluminescence to known luciferins, chemicals that produced light when oxidized by a luciferase enzyme, but it has been suggested that a novel photoprotein or luciferase might be present in sharks.

== Biology and ecology ==
Blackbelly lanternsharks are presumed to be ovoviviparous.

The diet of Etmopterus lucifer is generally characterized as consisting of squids and myctophids (lanternfishes) with slight regional differences. Populations found near Australia have been found to consume a variety of teleost, with the most common being myctophids, while also being known to feed on crustaceans and squids. Populations in Japan have been found to consume euphausiids as part of their regular diet instead of crustaceans, though they still retain squids, albeit mesopelagic squids, and myctophids as part of their feeding regime. In Southern Africa, E. lucifer has maintained myctophids in their diet, however, studies have found that they prefer to also hunt pelagic cephalopods in contrast to their regional counterparts that typically prefer squids in specific.

Etmopterus lucifer is thought to attract its prey through the use of the photophores primarily found concentrated on its body that contribute to its cryptic coloration that provides both camouflage from predators and prey alike. Etmopterus lucifer prey detection can be attributed to its theorized electro-sensory sensitivity. Blackbelly lanternsharks have been found to have a substantial number of Ampullae of Lorenzini, which contribute to the detection of electrical fields (and resultantly prey), and through the use of ducts and pores, blackbelly lanternsharks can reduce the hindrance experienced as the signal moves along by having the destination be a synapse with a large diameter. Through this reduction it is thought that the blackbelly lanternshark increases its overall sensitivity, allowing it to better detect faster prey. Once the prey is within distance, the blackbelly lanternshark then utilizes its jaw to consume its prey entirely. It is thought that the separation of the suborbital muscle from the mandibular adductor muscle observed within this species of lanternsharks is thought to aid in the further extension of the mouth and thus permit the lanternshark to consume larger prey. Labial cartilage present in E. lucifer has also been studied and found to aid in minor suction force which possibly assist with its feeding.

== Conservation status ==
In June 2018, the New Zealand Department of Conservation classified the blackbelly lanternshark as "Not Threatened" with the qualifiers "Data Poor" and "Secure Overseas" under the New Zealand Threat Classification System. The species has low fishing mortality, as its small size may allow evasion of nets and trawls.
