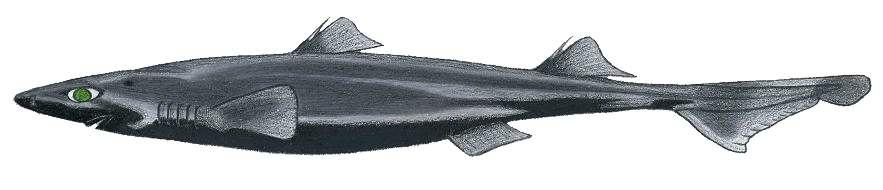

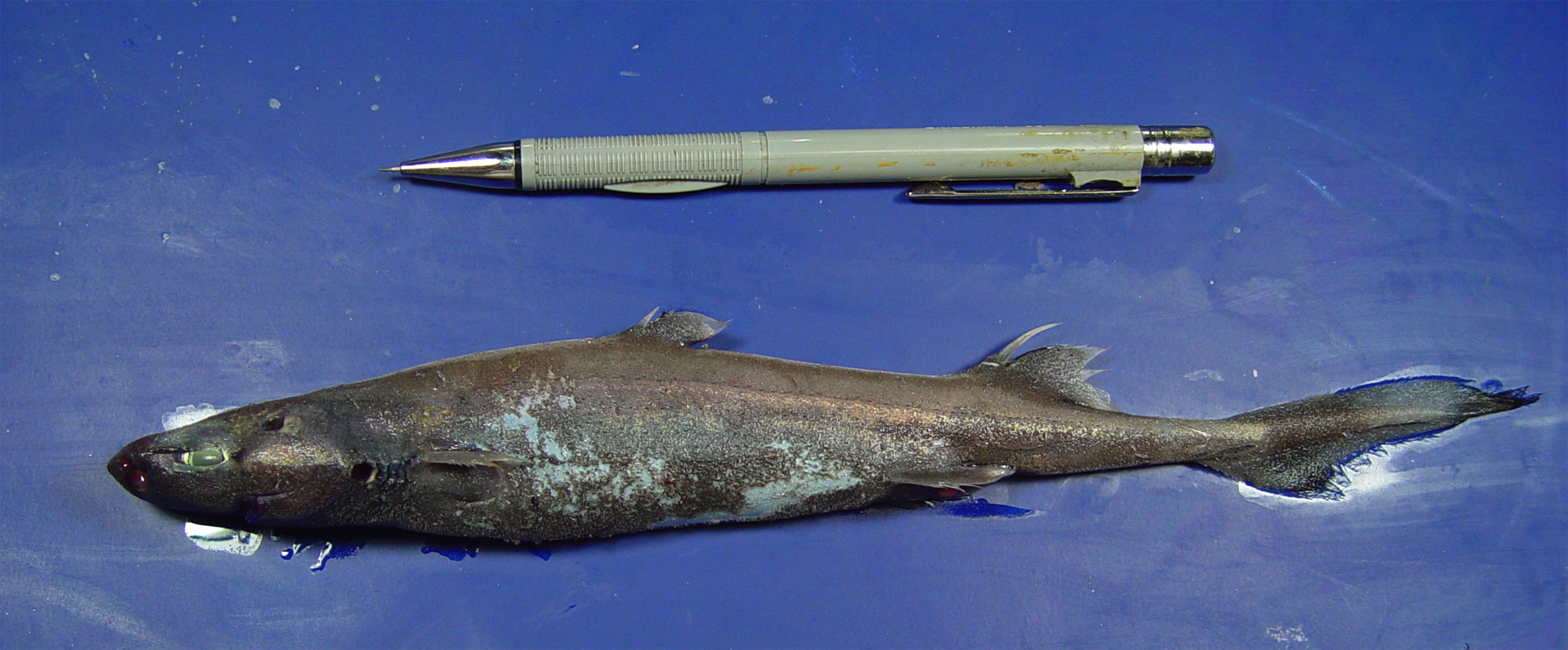

Conservation status
- Least Concern (IUCN 3.1)

Scientific classification
- Kingdom: Animalia
- Phylum: Chordata
- Class: Chondrichthyes
- Subclass: Elasmobranchii
- Division: Selachii
- Order: Squaliformes
- Family: Etmopteridae
- Genus: Etmopterus
- Species: E. hillianus

Binomial name
- Etmopterus hillianus (Poey, 1861)
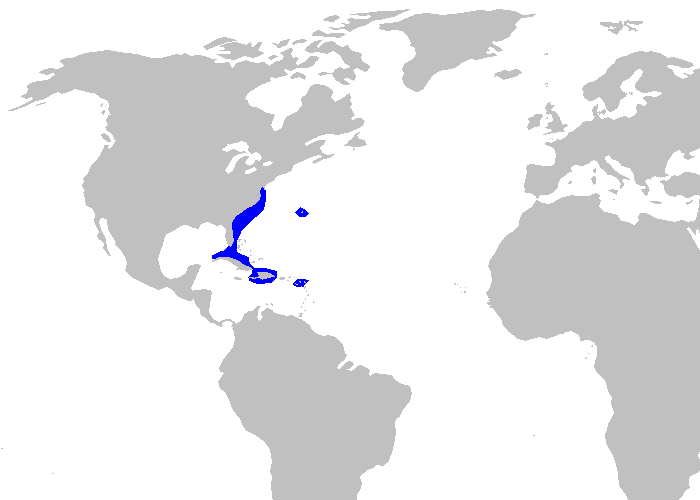
- Range of the Caribbean lanternshark (in blue)

= Caribbean lanternshark =

Species of shark

The Caribbean lanternshark (Etmopterus hillianus) is a shark of the family Etmopteridae found in the eastern and western Atlantic at depths between 180 and 720 m. Its length is up to 50 cm.

Reproduction is ovoviviparous.
