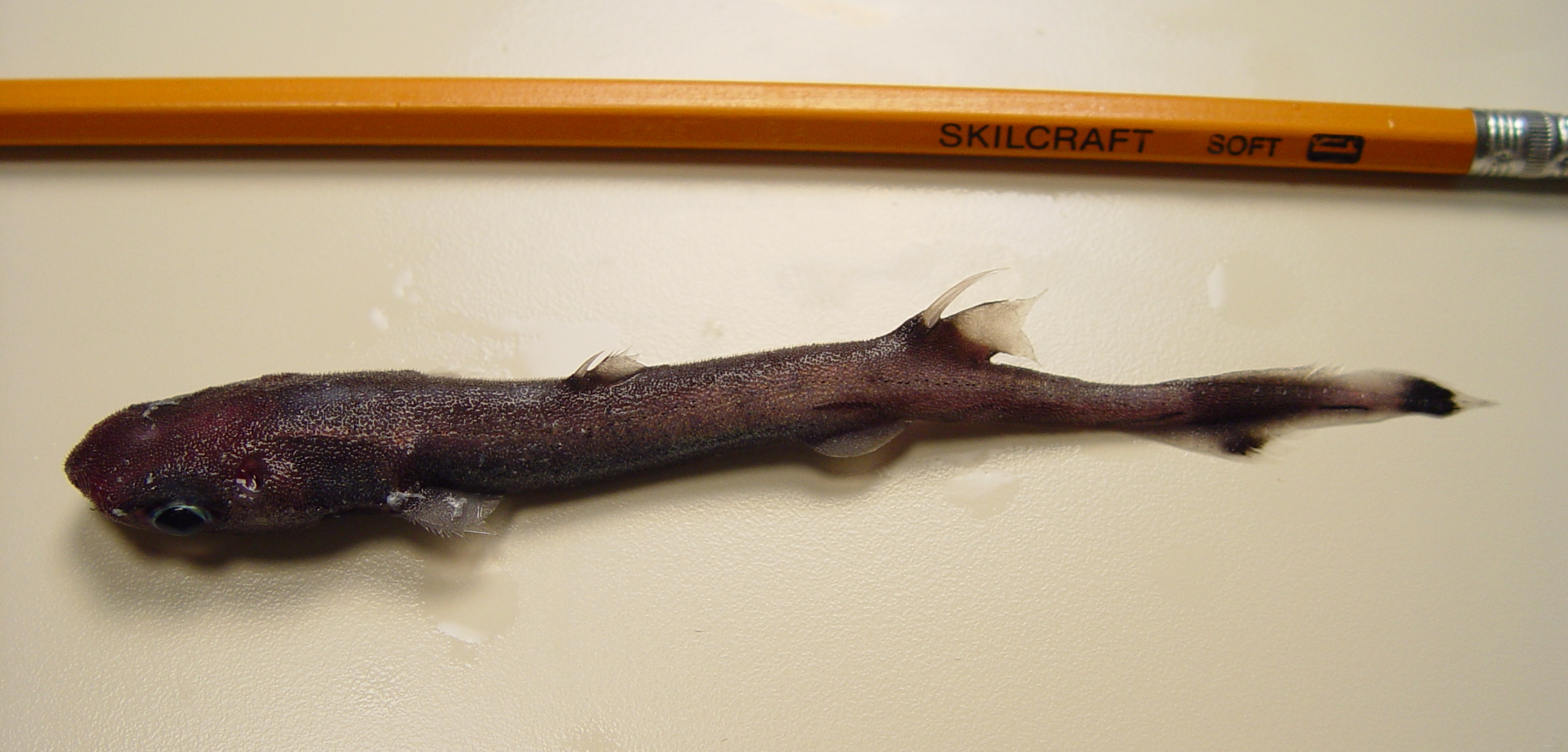

Conservation status
- Least Concern (IUCN 3.1)

Scientific classification
- Kingdom: Animalia
- Phylum: Chordata
- Class: Chondrichthyes
- Subclass: Elasmobranchii
- Division: Selachii
- Order: Squaliformes
- Family: Etmopteridae
- Genus: Etmopterus
- Species: E. gracilispinis

Binomial name
- Etmopterus gracilispinis G. Krefft, 1968
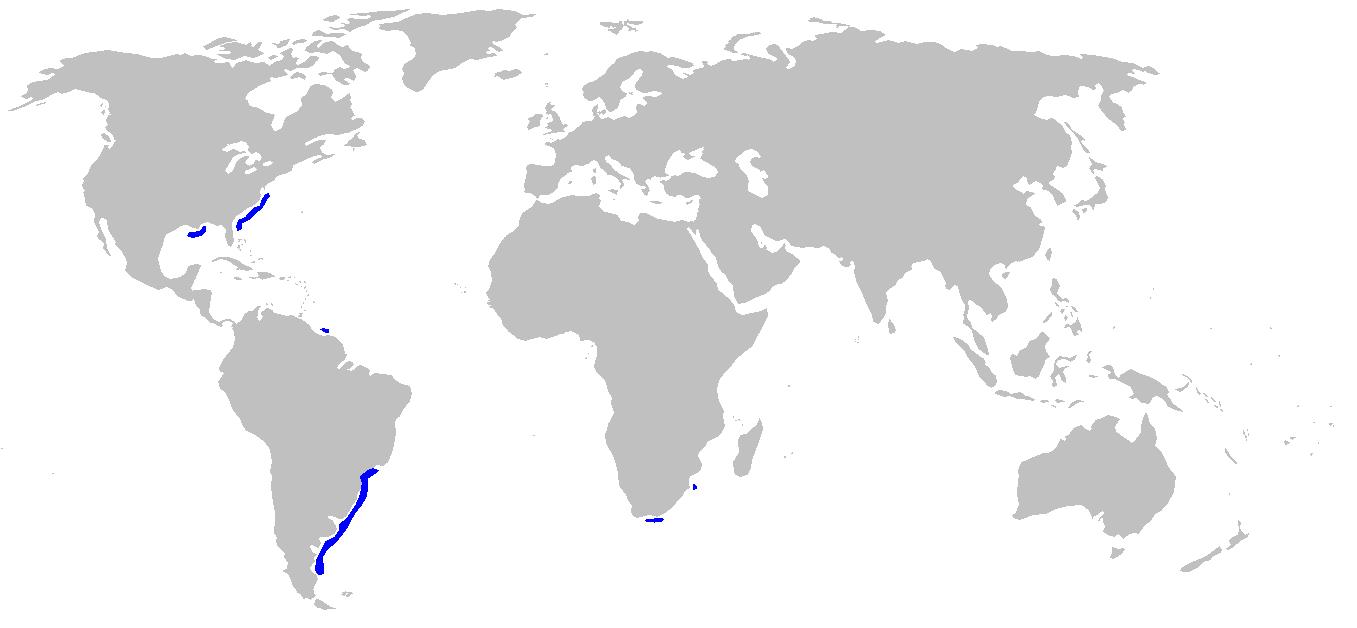
- Range of the broadbanded lanternshark (in blue)

= Broadbanded lanternshark =

Species of shark

The broadbanded lanternshark (Etmopterus gracilispinis) is a shark of the family Etmopteridae found in the western and southeast Atlantic, between latitudes 40°N and 45°S, at depths of between 70 and 1,000 m. Its length is up to 35 cm. Reproduction is presumed to be ovoviviparous.
