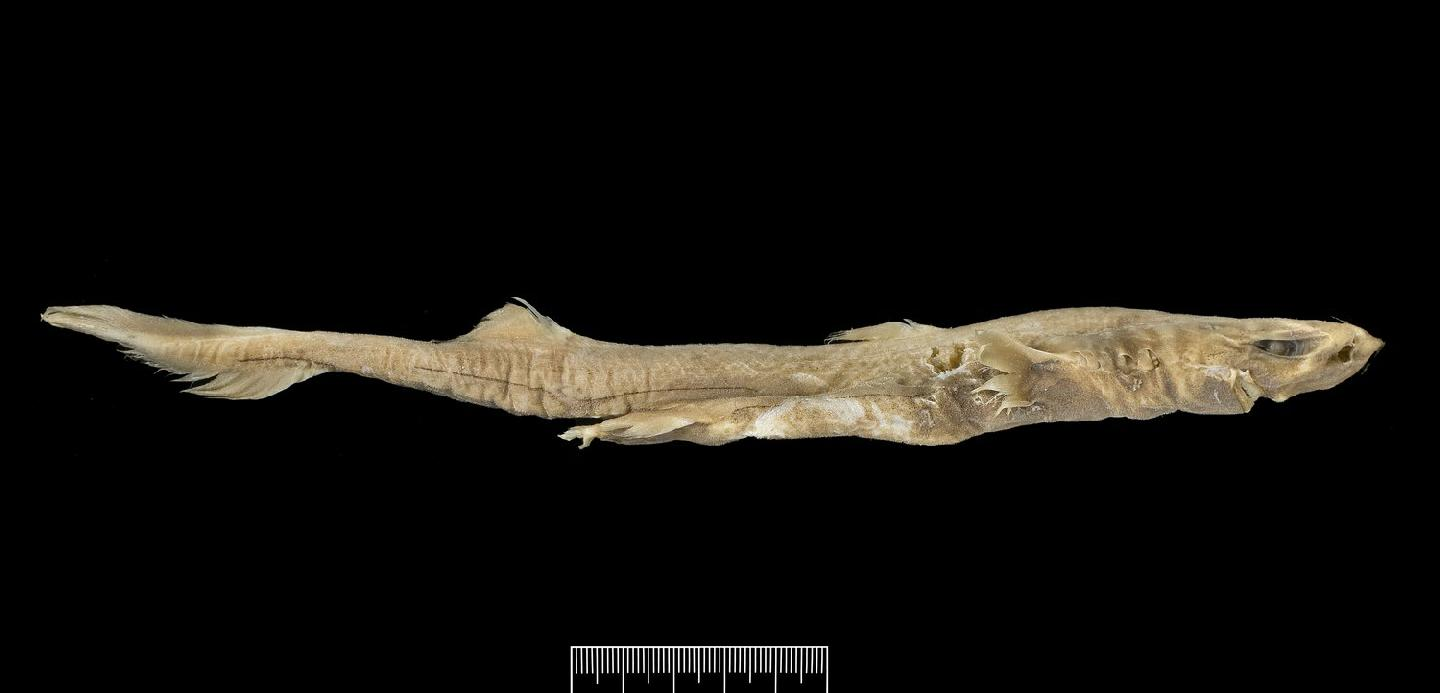

Conservation status
- Least Concern (IUCN 3.1)

Scientific classification
- Kingdom: Animalia
- Phylum: Chordata
- Class: Chondrichthyes
- Subclass: Elasmobranchii
- Division: Selachii
- Order: Squaliformes
- Family: Etmopteridae
- Genus: Etmopterus
- Species: E. decacuspidatus

Binomial name
- Etmopterus decacuspidatus W. L. Y. Chan, 1966
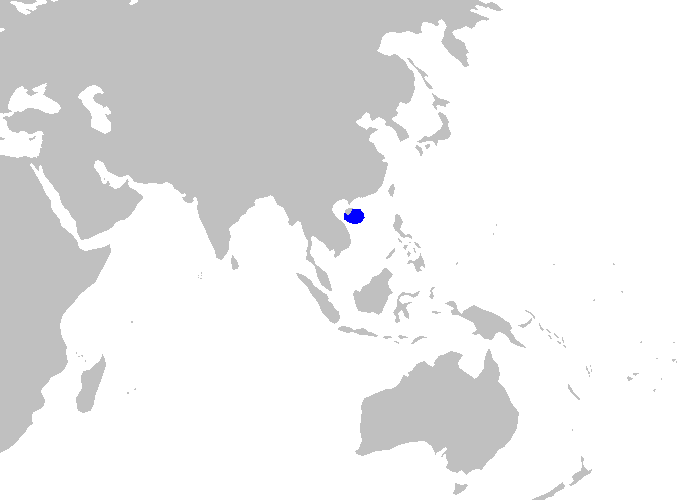
- Range of the combtooth lanternshark (in blue)

= Combtoothed lanternshark =

Species of shark

The combtoothed lanternshark (Etmopterus decacuspidatus) is a shark of the family Etmopteridae. The only specimen, and holotype, being found from the South China Sea between the Viet Nam coast and Hainan Island, at a depth of between 510 and 690 m. The holotype's length is 29 cm.

Reproduction is presumed to be ovoviviparous.
