= William Charles Schroeder =

American ichthyologist

William Charles Schroeder (1895–1977) was an American ichthyologist. He was born on Staten Island, New York. He, along with his lifelong colleague Henry Bryant Bigelow, made substantial contributions to the knowledge of the fish fauna of the western North Atlantic. The two described 42 new species of jawless fishes and cartilaginous fishes, and authored several seminal publications, including Fishes of the Western North Atlantic and Fishes of the Gulf of Maine.

== Legacy ==
- A species of Chilean lizard, Liolaemus schroederi, is named in his honor.
- A genus of catsharks, Schroederichthys, is named after Schroeder.

== See also ==
- Category:Taxa named by William Charles Schroeder
