= George Burgess (biologist) =

American biologist

George H. Burgess
- Known for: Shark expertise Shark Week
- Scientific career
- Fields: Ichthyology
- Workplaces: University of Florida

George H. Burgess is an ichthyologist and fisheries biologist with the Florida Museum of Natural History, University of Florida. He is the former director of the International Shark Attack File and author/coauthor of numerous books and papers on sharks and other fish.

Burgess has appeared on multiple Shark Week programs on Discovery Channel and Nick Frost's Danger! 50,000 Volts!.

Burgess retired in 2017. The Florida Museum of Natural History highlighted that he "always stressed the importance of shark conservation."

== Taxon named in his honor ==
- Etmopterus burgessi, sometimes known as the broad-snout lanternshark, is named for him.
