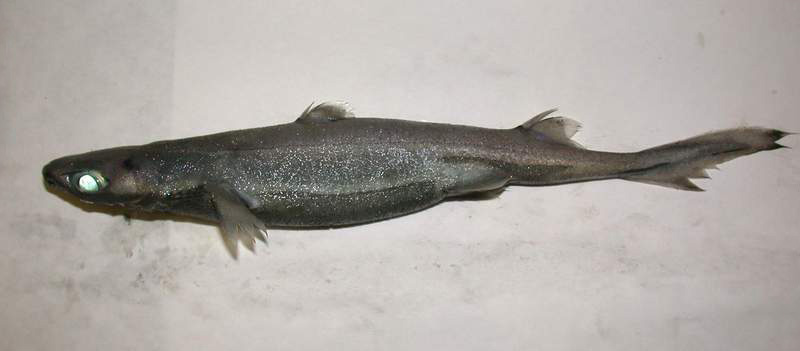
- Velvet belly lanternshark, Etmopterus spinax

Scientific classification
- Kingdom: Animalia
- Phylum: Chordata
- Class: Chondrichthyes
- Subclass: Elasmobranchii
- Division: Selachii
- Order: Squaliformes
- Family: Etmopteridae; Fowler, 1934

= Etmopteridae =

Lantern sharks

Family of sharks

The Etmopteridae are a family of sharks in the order Squaliformes, commonly known as lantern sharks. Their name comes from the presence of light-producing photophores on their bodies. The members of this family are small, under 90 cm (35 in) long, and are found in deep waters worldwide. The 45 species are placed in five genera. Three-quarters of the species are in the genus Etmopterus.

== Genera ==
- Aculeola
- Centroscyllium
- Etmopterus
- †Paraetmopterus
- Trigonognathus
