= Marine Conservation Zone =

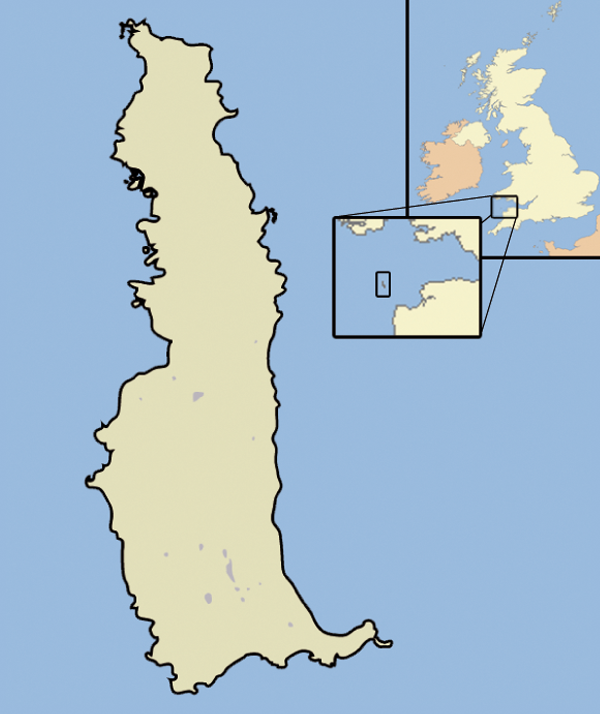
Map of Lundy with inset maps of British Isles and Bristol Channel

A Marine Conservation Zone (MCZ) is a type of marine nature reserve in UK waters. They were established under the Marine and Coastal Access Act (2009) and are areas designated with the aim to protect nationally important, rare or threatened habitats and species. Approximately 20% of UK waters now have some protection although some conservation, fisherman and wildlife groups are concerned that there are no management plans for each zone.

Following Brexit, legislation was introduced into Parliament in January 2020 which would give new powers to the Marine Management Organisation in English waters.

== No Take Zones ==
Isle of Arran. South Arran is a Marine Protection Area

MCZs generally do not provide "no-take" protection banning fishing. However, Lundy Island MCZ includes a preexisting "no-take zone", which was established in 2003. Two more no-take zones were established in UK waters by 2010 (bringing the total area protected to five square kilometres):, and an additional one in 2016

- Lamlash Bay (2008), subsequently included within the South Arran Marine Protection Area.
- Flamborough Head (2010). This no-take zone is part of a marine SAC rather than a MCZ.
- Medway Nursery Area (2016). This 12.1 square kilometre no-take zone is part of the Medway Estuary MCZ.

There has been criticism of the MCZs for not providing "no-take" protection for a higher proportion of UK waters; for example, the environmentalist George Monbiot has raised the issue in his column in The Guardian. Bottom trawling remains permitted in many of the UK's marine protected areas, including its MCZs.

== Highly Protected Marine Areas ==
Allonby Bay off the Solway Firth, Cumbria, North East of Farnes Deep off Northumberland, and Dolphin Head, West Sussex, have been chosen as Highly Protected Marine Areas (HPMAs), which give greater protection to the marine environment, with prohibitions against activity such as dredging and trawling. The new status came into force in July 2023. Joan Edwards, speaking on behalf of The Wildlife Trusts, said, "These three tiny spots cover just 0.4% of English seas - and we're looking forward to seeing further designations so that we can safeguard our seas for the future." A plan to create HPMAs in 10% of Scotland's seas was rejected by the Scottish government following pressure from the fishing industry and some island communities.

== England ==
On 21 November 2013 the first twenty-seven Marine Conservation Zones were designated, a further twenty-three were announced on 17 January 2016 followed by a further forty-one on 31 May 2019.

=== 2013 Marine Conservation Zones ===
1. Aln Estuary
2. Beachy Head West
3. Blackwater, Crouch, Roach and Colne Estuaries
4. The Canyons
5. Chesil Beach and Stennis Ledges
6. Cumbria Coast
7. East of Haig Fras
8. Folkestone Pomerania
9. Fylde
10. Isles of Scilly
11. Kingmere
12. Lundy
13. The Manacles
14. Medway Estuary
15. North East of Farnes Deep
16. Padstow Bay and Surrounds
17. Pagham Harbour
18. Poole Rocks
19. Skerries Bank and Surrounds
20. South Dorset
21. South-West Deeps (West)
22. Swallow Sand
23. Tamar Estuary
24. Thanet Coast
25. Torbay
26. Upper Fowey and Pont Pill
27. Whitsand and Looe Bay

=== 2016 Marine Conservation Zones ===
1. Allonby Bay
2. Bideford to Foreland Bay
3. Coquet to St Mary's
4. Cromer Shoal Chalk Beds
5. Dover to Deal
6. Dover to Folkestone
7. Farnes East
8. Fulmar
9. Greater Haig Fras
10. Hartland Point to Tintagel
11. Holderness Inshore
12. North-west of Jones Bank
13. Land's End
14. Mount's Bay
15. The Needles
16. Newquay and The Gannel
17. Offshore Brighton
18. Offshore Overfalls (south-east of the Isle of Wight)
19. Runswick Bay
20. Swale Estuary
21. Utopia (south-west of Selsey Bill)
22. Western Channel
23. West of Walney co-location zone

=== 2019 Marine Conservation Zones ===
1. Albert Field
2. Axe Estuary
3. Beachy Head East
4. Bembridge
5. Berwick to St. Mary's
6. Camel Estuary
7. Cape Bank
8. Dart Estuary
9. Devon Avon Estuary
10. East of Start Point
11. Erme Estuary
12. Foreland
13. Goodwin Sands
14. Helford Estuary
15. Holderness Offshore
16. Inner Bank
17. Kentish Knock East
18. Markham's Triangle
19. Morte Platform
20. North East of Haig Fras
21. North West of Lundy
22. Orford Inshore
23. Otter Estuary
24. Purbeck Coast
25. Queenie Corner
26. Ribble Estuary
27. Selsey Bill and the Hounds
28. Solway Firth
29. South of Celtic Deep
30. South of Portland
31. South of the Isles of Scilly
32. South Rigg
33. South West Approaches to the Bristol Channel
34. South West Deeps (East)
35. Southbourne Rough
36. Studland Bay
37. Swanscombe
38. West of Copeland
39. West of Wight Barfleur
40. Wyre-Lune
41. Yarmouth to Cowes

== Northern Ireland ==
Following the passing of the Marine Act (Northern Ireland) 2013 only Strangford Lough was designated as a Marine Conservation Zone. In 2015 consultations for a further four proposed MCZs were announced. The consultations ended in March 2016 and the four MCZs were designated in December 2016.

=== Proposed Marine Conservation Zones ===
1. Carlingford
2. Outer Belfast Lough
3. Rathlin
4. Waterfoot

== Scotland ==
In the summer of 2014 the Cabinet Secretary for Rural Affairs, Food and the Environment announced thirty new Marine Protected Areas. Along with thirty Special Areas of Conservation (SAC), forty-seven Special Protection Areas (SPA) and sixty-one Sites of Special Scientific Interest (SSSI), 20% of Scottish waters have differing levels of protection.

=== Nature Conservation Marine Protected Areas ===
There are seventeen protected areas within Scotland's territorial waters (i.e. within 12 nautical miles (22 km))

1. Clyde Sea Sill
2. East Caithness Cliffs
3. Fetlar to Haroldswick
4. Loch Creran
5. Loch Sunart
6. Loch Sunart to the Sound of Jura
7. Loch Sween
8. Lochs Duich, Long and Alsh
9. Monarch Isles
10. Mousa to Boddam
11. Noss Head
12. Papa Westray
13. Small Isles
14. South Arran
15. Upper Loch Fyne and Loch Goil
16. Wester Ross
17. Wyre and Rousay Sounds

A further thirteen protected areas are outside Scottish territorial waters

1. Central Fladen (CFL)
2. East of Gannet and Montrose Fields (EGM)
3. Faroe-Shetland Sponge Belt (FSS)
4. Firth of Forth Banks Complex (FOF)
5. Geikie Slide and Hebridean Slope (GSH)
6. Hatton-Rockall Basin (HRB)
7. North-east Faroe-Shetland Channel (NEF)
8. North-west Orkney (NWO)
9. Norwegian Boundary Sediment Plain (NSP)
10. Rosemary Bank Seamount (RBS)
11. Barra Fan and Hebrides Terrace Seamount (BHT)
12. Turbot Bank (TBB)
13. West Shetland Shelf (WSS)

== Wales ==
Skomer Marine Conservation Zone (around the island of Skomer) is the only site in Wales designated as a Marine Conservation Zone. There are 128 marine protected areas in Welsh seas and Natural Resources Wales (Cyfoeth Naturiol Cymru) is consulting with the Welsh Government and the Joint Nature Conservation Committee (JNCC) to consider if anymore areas need protecting.

== See also ==
- Marine Nature Reserve
