= Fladen Ground =

Area in the North Sea

Coordinates: 58.5000°N 0.5000°E

Fladen Ground

Fladen Ground is an area in the Scottish sector of the North Sea, between Scotland and Norway, about 100 miles (160 km) northeast of Aberdeen. The Fair Isle current and adjacent East Shetland Atlantic tides contribute to a weak, anti-clockwise rotating vast vortex or eddy easily shown in the surface of the seabed. Due to stratification of the water column in the summer months, seasonal change of deep water temperature is low. This measures (5.7–8 °C; 42–46 °F). Water depths are predominantly between 100–150 m (330–490 ft; 55–82 fathoms), and the mostly muddy sea floor has accumulated sediments from some storm-driven scouring action to surrounds. The dominant benthic animals are polychaetes and shellfish and other seafoods are common. The name is not used by the British shipping (weather) forecast sectors, which extend the Long Forties depth zone eastward as Forties (see Long Forties) for simplicity.

Fladen Ground is rich in oil and natural gas and offers good fishing. Scottish vessels catch low-fat fish species, and Norway lobster. Danish and English vessels catch Northern prawn.

== Nature Conservation Marine Protected Area ==
Central Fladen MPA(NC)
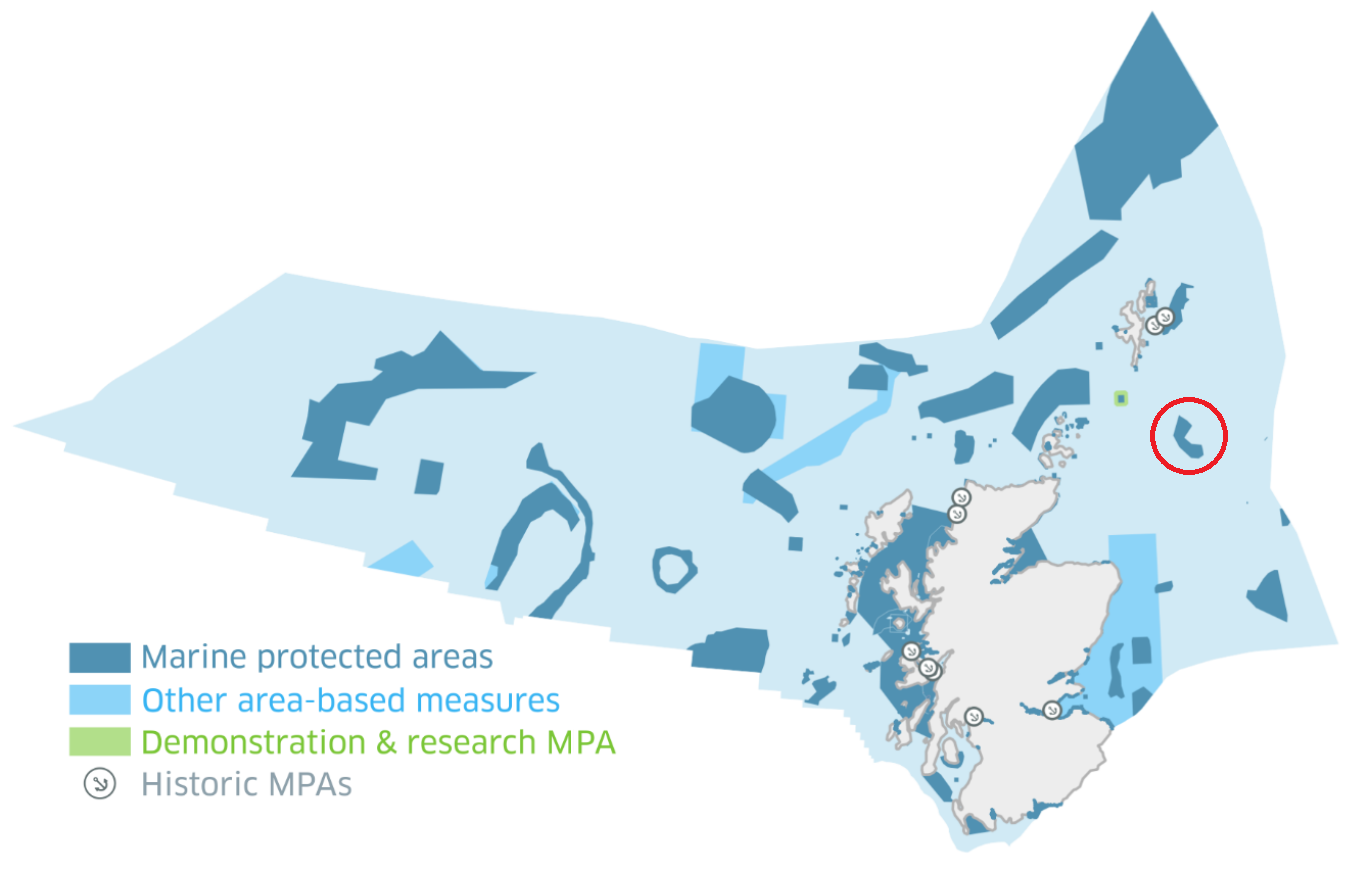
- The Central Fladden MPA (circled in red), shown within Scottish waters.
- Location: North Sea, Scotland
- Area: 925 km^{2} (357 sq mi)
- Designation: Scottish Government
- Established: 2014
- Operator: Marine Scotland

Since 2014, 92,500 hectares (357 mi^{2}) of the Fladen Ground has been a Nature Conservation Marine Protected Area under the title Central Fladen MPA(NC).

== See also ==
- Dogger Bank for links to similar places
