= BCRC =

BCRC may refer to:

- British Committee for Refugees from Czechoslovakia, a non-governmental organization devoted to the care and emigration of refugees from Czechoslovakia in 1938 and 1939
- Berks County Residential Center, an immigration detention center in Pennsylvania
- Blackwater, Crouch, Roach and Colne Estuaries Marine Conservation Zone (BCRC MCZ), Essex, England
- British Cave Rescue Council, a coordinating body for cave rescue organisations in the British Isles
- Baltimore Cancer Research Center, a former name of the University of Maryland Marlene and Stewart Greenebaum Comprehensive Cancer Center
- Beef Cattle Research Council, a body funded by the Canadian Beef Check-Off Agency
- British Columbia Railway Company, a former name of BC Rail
