= Turbot Bank =

Seabed feature in the North Sea

Turbot Bank MPA
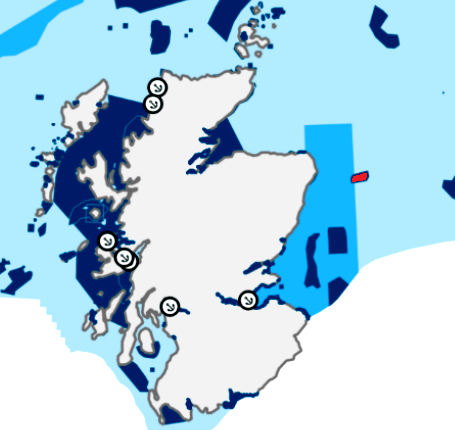
- The location and extent of the Turbot Bank MPA, shown in red
- Location: North Sea, Scotland
- Coordinates: 57°23′N 0°53′W
- Area: 251 km^{2} (97 sq mi)
- Designation: Scottish Government
- Established: 2014
- Operator: Marine Scotland

The Turbot Bank is a shelf bank and mound feature of the seabed of the North Sea that lies off the east coast of Scotland, about 44 kilometres (27 mi) east of Peterhead. The depth of water above the bank varies from 60 m below sea level on top of the bank down to 80 m at its margins. It has been designated as a Nature Conservation Marine Protected Area since 2014.

It is an important habitat for sand eels, small fish of various species that are eaten by seabirds such as Atlantic puffin (Fratercula arctica) and black-legged kittiwake (Rissa tridactyla), as well as fish such as plaice (Pleuronectes platessa) and marine mammals such as dolphins. The bank is particularly associated with Raitt's sand eel (Ammodytes marinus), which live buried in the sand of the bank for months at a time.

== See also ==
- Firth of Forth Banks Complex
