= Norwegian Boundary Sediment Plain =

Protected area of sea off Scotland

Norwegian Boundary Sediment Plain MPA
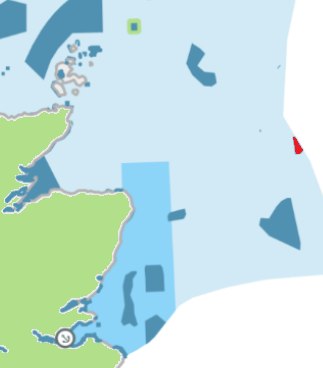
- The location and extent of the Norwegian Boundary Sediment Plain MPA, shown in red off the east coast of Scotland.
- Location: North Sea, Scotland
- Coordinates: 58°05′N 1°43′E
- Area: 16,400 ha (63 sq mi)
- Designation: Scottish Government
- Established: 2014
- Operator: Marine Scotland

The Norwegian Boundary Sediment Plain is a Marine Protected Area (MPA) lying to the northeast of Scotland. The MPA, which covers 164 km^{2} (63 sq mi), lies at the very edge of Scottish offshore waters, close to the maritime boundary with Norway. The seabed of the sediment plain consists of sand and gravel habitats, and lies at a depth of between 80 and 120 metres below sea level. The sea bed supports creatures such as starfish, crabs and ocean quahogs. The latter, which are large and slow growing clams, have a lifespan of more than 400 years and are thus considered to be amongst the oldest living animals on Earth.
