= Welsh Zone (Boundaries and Transfer of Functions) Order 2010 =

- Statutory Instrument
- Parliament of the United Kingdom
- Citation: SI 2010/760
- Territorial extent: Wales

Dates
- Made: 17 March 2010
- Commencement: 31 March 2010

Other legislation
- Made under: Government of Wales Act 2006

Status: Current legislation

Text of the Welsh Zone (Boundaries and Transfer of Functions) Order 2010 as in force today (including any amendments) within the United Kingdom, from legislation.gov.uk.

The Welsh Zone (Boundaries and Transfer of Functions) Order 2010 (SI 2010/760) is a statutory instrument of the United Kingdom government, defining the boundaries of internal waters, territorial sea, and British Fishing Limits adjacent to Wales. It was introduced in accordance with the Government of Wales Act 2006, which reformed the devolved National Assembly for Wales.

== Defining jurisdictions ==
The territorial waters defined come under the jurisdiction of Welsh law, and are also used for defining the area of operation of the Welsh Government (including the Marine and Fisheries Division) and other Welsh Government agencies and sponsored bodies.

The territorial waters defined as not being Welsh waters come under the jurisdiction of either Scottish law, Northern Ireland law, or the rest of English law. Because the order defines the territorial limits of the separate jurisdictions, it comprises a piece of constitutional law in the constitution of the United Kingdom.

== Welsh waters ==
Welsh waters is a colloquial term which can refer to different sea areas, including:

- Internal waters and territorial sea adjacent to Wales. ("Wales" as defined in the Government of Wales Act 2006)
- British Fishing Limits adjacent to Wales. ("The Welsh Zone" as defined in the Government of Wales Act 2006)
- The UK continental shelf limits adjacent to Wales. (Part of the "Welsh offshore marine region" as defined in the Marine and Coastal Access Act 2009)

== Application ==
The Welsh Government had not chosen not to reform fishing in Wales using this instrument before 2020. In 2019, the Welsh Government published the first Welsh National Marine Plan.

The Welsh Government maintains the "ecosystem-based management" of these waters, including Carmarthen Bay and Estuaries.

== Political implications ==
The Irish Sea has six different governments administering the management of fisheries and vessels on it, (Note: England, Scotland, Wales, Northern Ireland, and the Isle of Man all separately administer their own waters on the Irish Sea. The Republic of Ireland maintains a maritime jurisdiction within the EU.) and it can therefore be seen as a "particularly complex area".

Soon after this order, the United Kingdom government signed and ratified the International Convention on the Control of Harmful Anti-Fouling Systems on Ships, which applies this agreement to the Welsh zone.

== See also ==
- England-Wales border
- Scottish Adjacent Waters Boundaries Order 1999
- Adjacent Waters Boundaries (Northern Ireland) Order 2002
