= Marine Protected Areas in Scotland =

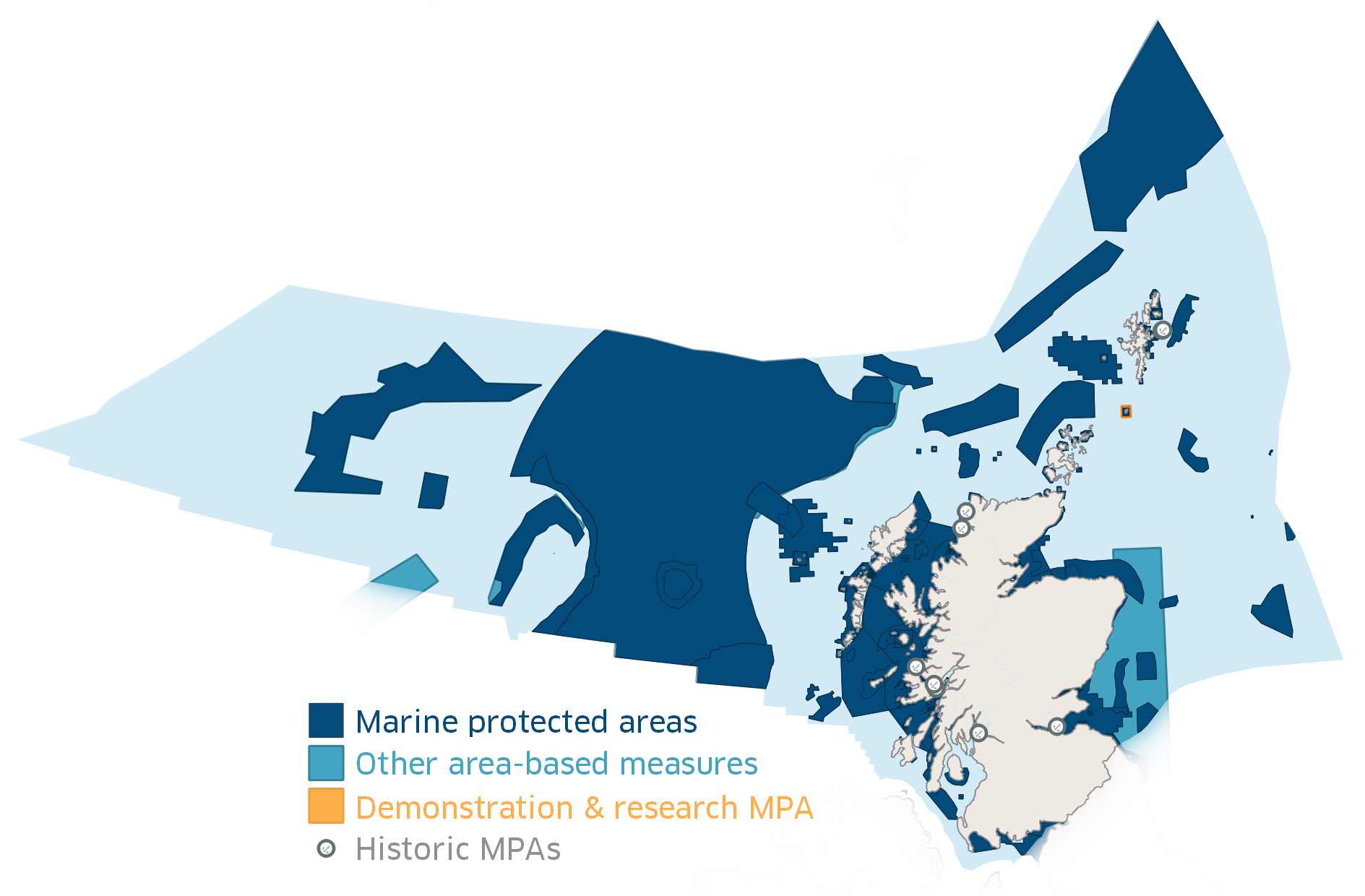
A map showing the location of Marine Protected Areas in Scottish waters as of December 2020.

In Scotland, Marine Protected Areas (MPAs) are designated areas of the sea aimed at protecting habitats, wildlife, geology, undersea landforms, historic shipwrecks, and demonstrating sustainable management of marine resources. As of August 2025, approximately 37% of Scotland's seas are covered by the Scottish MPA network, which comprises 243 sites. (Note: There were 243 sites in the network as of December 2024, with 2 sites added to be added in November 2025.)

== Designation ==
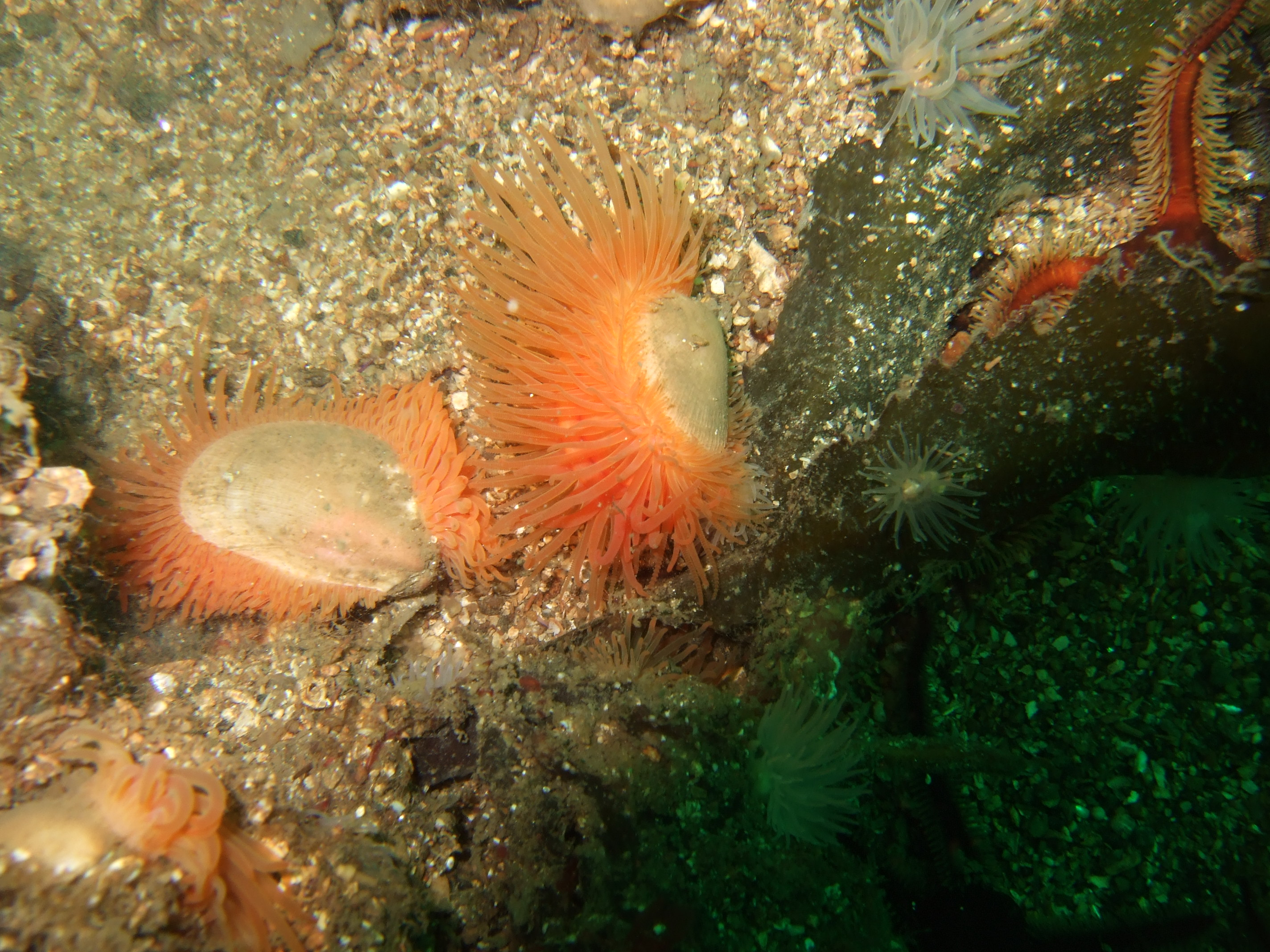
The Loch Carron MPA is the site of the world's largest flame shell bed.

As of August 2025, Scotland's MPA network comprises 243 sites protected under various conservation designations. Many of these designations are the same as those used on land, such as Special Protection Areas (SPAs) and Sites of Special Scientific Interest (SSSIs).

The legal framework for designating MPAs depends on the designation. For example, SSSIs are designated under the Nature Conservation (Scotland) Act 2004. Where sites are not designated under other conservation legislation, MPAs are designated under one of two acts of parliament, depending on their location:

- The Marine (Scotland) Act 2010 is an act of the Scottish Parliament that gives the Scottish Government the power to designate MPAs in Scottish Territorial Waters (waters up to 12 nautical miles off the coastline).
- The Marine and Coastal Access Act 2009 is an act of the UK Parliament that gives the Scottish Government the power to designate MPAs in Scottish Offshore Waters (waters lying further from the coast than 12 nautical miles, and defined as Scottish by the Scottish Adjacent Waters Boundaries Order 1999).

Sites are designated as MPAs under these acts for one of three purposes:

- Nature Conservation MPAs are designated to protect biodiversity.
- Historical MPAs are used to protect sites such as marine wrecks and artefacts.
- Demonstration and Research MPAs are designated to test novel approaches to marine management.

In addition to the statutory MPAs, five sites were recognized as part of the Scottish MPA network, categorized as "other effective area-based conservation measures" (OECMs). Although these areas were not specifically created for nature conservation purposes, restrictions in place for these areas meant that they were considered to contribute to the protection of marine biodiversity. By December 2024 only one area was still considered to be an OECM, as changes in legislation and the extension of other areas had rendered the other OECM no longer relevant. The makeup of the network as of August 2025 is detailed in the table below:

Purpose	Designation	Number
Nature Conservation	Special Area of Conservation (SAC)	58
Nature Conservation	Special Protection Area (SPA)	58
Nature Conservation	Site of Special Scientific Interest (SSSI)	65
Nature Conservation	Ramsar	16
Nature Conservation	Nature Conservation MPA	36
Total MPAs for nature conservation purposes		233
Demonstration and Research	Demonstration and Research MPA	1
Historic	Historic MPA	8
Other area-based measures		1
Total sites in Scottish MPA network		243

== Management ==
The lead body for the management of MPAs in Scotland is Marine Scotland. For nature conservation sites within territorial waters, NatureScot is responsible for developing the network, providing scientific advice to the Scottish Government on site selection, and advising Marine Scotland on management once sites are designated. The Joint Nature Conservation Committee (JNCC) fulfills this role for sites in offshore waters and also has a coordinating role for nature conservation across all the UK's offshore waters. Historic Environment Scotland is responsible for managing historic MPAs.

Activities undertaken in an MPA can be managed through voluntary measures or by implementing Marine Conservation Orders or Inshore Fishing Orders. Management measures, such as restrictions on the type of fishing gear that can be used, may be in place for all or part of an MPA and may only apply at certain times of the year. Environmental groups have criticized the government for failing to enforce fishing rules around MPAs.

== List of MPAs ==
These tables list those MPAs not covered by other designations (i.e. excluding SACs, SPAs, and SSSIs etc.) as of August 2025.

=== Historic MPAs ===
Name	Size (ha)	Date	Designation	Advisory body
HMS Campania	7.1	1 November 2013	HMPA4	HES
HMS Dartmouth	0.8	1 November 2013	HMPA6	HES
Drumbeg	7.1	18 March 2013	HMPA1	HES
Duart Point	1.8	1 November 2013	HMPA7	HES
Iona I	2.5	26 October 2016	HMPA8	HES
Kinlochbervie	28.3	1 November 2013	HMPA3	HES
Mingary	19.6	1 November 2013	HMPA2	HES
Out Skerries	22.8	1 November 2013	HMPA5	HES
Swedish East India Company ship Queen of Sweden	2	28 October 2025	HMPA9	HES
Scuttled German High Seas Fleet in Scapa Flow	1070	28 October 2025	HMPA10	HES

=== Nature Conservation MPAs ===
Name	Area (km^{2})	Date	Advisory body
Central Fladen	925	7 August 2014	JNCC
Clyde Sea Sill	712	7 August 2014	NatureScot
East Caithness Cliffs	114	7 August 2014	NatureScot
East of Gannet and Montrose Fields	1,839	7 August 2014	JNCC
Faroe–Shetland Sponge Belt	5,278	7 August 2014	JNCC
Fetlar to Haroldswick	216	18 November 2016	NatureScot
Firth of Forth Banks Complex	2,130	7 August 2014	JNCC
Geikie Slide and Hebridean Slope	2,215	7 August 2014	JNCC
Hatton-Rockall Basin	1,256	7 August 2014	JNCC
Loch Carron	23	19 May 2019	NatureScot
Loch Creran	12	7 August 2014	NatureScot
Loch Sunart	49	7 August 2014	NatureScot
Loch Sunart to the Sound of Jura	741	7 August 2014	NatureScot
Loch Sween	41	7 August 2014	NatureScot
Lochs Duich, Long and Alsh	37	7 August 2014	NatureScot
Monach Isles	62	7 August 2014	NatureScot
Mousa to Boddam	13	7 August 2014	NatureScot
North-east Faroe–Shetland Channel	23,682	7 August 2014	JNCC
North-east Lewis	90,700	3 December 2020	NatureScot
North-west Orkney	4,365	7 August 2014	JNCC
Norwegian Boundary Sediment Plain	164	7 August 2014	JNCC
Noss Head	8	7 August 2014	NatureScot
Red Rocks and Longay	12	16 December 2021	NatureScot
Papa Westray	33	7 August 2014	NatureScot
Sea of the Hebrides	10,039	3 December 2020	NatureScot
Shiant East Bank	25,200	3 December 2020	NatureScot
Small Isles	803	18 November 2016	NatureScot
Southern Trench	239,800	3 December 2020	NatureScot
South Arran	280	7 August 2014	NatureScot
The Barra Fan and Hebrides Terrace Seamount	4,373	7 August 2014	JNCC
Turbot Bank	251	7 August 2014	JNCC
Upper Loch Fyne and Loch Goil	88	7 August 2014	NatureScot
West of Scotland	107,773	9 October 2020	JNCC
West Shetland Shelf	4,083	7 August 2014	JNCC
Wester Ross	599	7 August 2014	NatureScot
Wyre and Rousay Sounds	16	7 August 2014	NatureScot

=== Demonstration and Research MPA ===
There is one Demonstration and Research Marine Protected Area (MPA) in the waters surrounding Fair Isle. This MPA was designated on 9 November 2016. The aims of this MPA designation are defined as follows:

To demonstrate and research the use of an ecosystem approach, which includes the following -

a) the environmental monitoring of seabirds and of other mobile marine species;
b) the environmental monitoring of the factors which influence the populations of seabirds and of other mobile species;
c) the development and implementation of a local sustainable shellfish fishery;
d) the development of a research programme into local fisheries which includes research on species composition, size, distribution and temporal and spatial changes in fish stocks;

e) based upon the research undertaken under sub-paragraph (d), the development of a sustainable-use management programme for local fisheries.

— Scottish Government

=== Other effective area-based conservation measures (OECMs) ===
In 2018, 5 areas were considered to form part of the MPA network as a result of area-based conservation measures other than the main statutory designations; these are listed below. By December 2024 only one area was still regarded as falling into this category due to changes in the protection of the other areas.

Name	Size (km^{2})	Status (December 2024)
East Coast of Scotland (sand eels)	21,320	Following the extension of the prohibition on sand eel fishing to cover all Scottish waters this area is no longer considered part of the MPA network.
West of Scotland (blue ling)	6,009	Area is now covered by the West of Scotland MPA
Rosemary Bank (blue ling)	8,955	Area is now covered by the West of Scotland NCMPA
West Rockall Mound	5,124	Remains an OECM
North West Rockall	346	Area is now covered by the North-West Rockall SAC
