= Marine conservation zones in Yorkshire =

Marine Conservation Zones in Yorkshire
- Holderness Inshore; Holderness Offshore; Markham's Triangle; Runswick Bay
- Yorkshire Marine Conservation Zones. Those proposed but not given conservation status, are shaded deep blue. This is representational and is not to scale, or exact in location.
- Designation: Marine Conservation Zones
- Designated: 2016; 2019

The marine conservation zones in Yorkshire, were created in 2016 and 2019 after an extensive consultation, which drew criticism of the UK Government's plans which designated only 31 zones out of the projected 127 zones in 2013. An £8 million study recommended the 127 sites, of which, eight lay in and around the coast of Yorkshire. (Note: Silver pit has been a favourite fishing ground for many Yorkshire-based fishing vessels, but geographically it stretches from the Humber Estuary southwards into the shore off Lincolnshire, though it has been described as being "off the Yorkshire coast".)

In June 2020. a review led by Richard Benyon MP, stated that nearly 50 areas around the UK coastline (three off the Yorkshire Coast), should become Highly Protected Marine Areas (HPMAs). This would see the banning of dredging, sewage dumping, drilling, offshore wind-turbine construction and catch-and-release sea fishing.

== History ==
The Review of Marine Nature Conservation (RMNC) was established in 1999 to provide an effective framework for protection sections of the marine environment surrounding the United Kingdom. Before this, international agreements included the United Nations Conference on the Human Environment (1972), and the adoption ten years later by the UN General Assembly of the World Charter for Nature (1982, UN Resolution 37/7).

The Marine Conservation Zone Project was launched in 2008, to determine which areas around England, Wales and Northern Ireland should be awarded the status of a Marine Conservation Zone (MCZ), which led to the Marine and Coastal Access Act 2009. The project divided up the relevant parts of the United Kingdom into four areas; the South West was labelled Finding Sanctuary, the South East Balanced Seas, the Irish Sea area Irish Sea Conservation Zones, and the North Sea area as Net Gain. In September 2011, the four regional MCZ projects put forward their proposals for MCZs in their area.

No sites in Yorkshire were designated in the first tranche (2013); they were either designated in tranche 2 (2016), or tranche 3 (2019).

== List of MCZs ==
Designation Data
Name	Date	IUCN ID	UK ID	NGN (Note: Net Gain number)	Coordinates (Note: Located in a central part of the MCZ)	Area	Depth range	KS (Note: Key species)	KH (Note: Key habitats)	Notes
Holderness Inshore	2016	555588159	UKMCZ0035	8	53.8024°N 0.0254°W	191.92 miles (308.87 km)	Sea level to 49 feet (15 m)	N/A	8	
Holderness Offshore	2019	N/A	N/A	9	53.8182°N 0.4394°W	454 square miles (1,176 km^{2})	33 feet (10 m) – 160 feet (50 m)	1	4	
Markham's Triangle	2019	N/A	N/A	7	54.0000°N 2.5221°E	77 square miles (200 km^{2})	98 feet (30 m) – 160 feet (50 m)	N/A	4	
Runswick Bay	2016	5555588166	UKMCZ0039	11	54.5335°N 0.7353°W	26.13 square miles (67.67 km^{2})	33 feet (10 m) – 98 feet (30 m)	1	10	

=== Holderness Inshore ===
Holderness Inshore MCZ stretches for over 191 miles (308 km) and includes the tip of Spurn Point in the south, to the village of Skipsea in the north. The MCZ extends from the shore to 3 nautical miles (5.6 km; 3.5 mi) out to sea and has a "wonderful mosaic of cobble, mixed sediment, sand and chalk, alongside patches of peat and clay". The shoreline and seabed support various fauna and algae as well as wrasse, European eel, dab, as well as commercially important crab and lobster.

=== Holderness Offshore ===
Holderness offshore lies 6 nautical miles (11 km; 6.9 mi) off the coast of the East Riding of Yorkshire, with Barmston and Kilnsea being its northern and southern end points respectively. The site, which is 160 feet (50 m) deep and covers an area of 454 square miles (1,176 km^{2}), is noted for its ross worms, crabs, lobsters and ocean quahogs. The site also overlaps the Southern North Sea Special Area of Conservation, which protects harbour porpoises.

=== Markham's Triangle ===
Markham's Triangle lies over 84 miles (135 km) off the Holderness coastline. The area supports sand eels, which are food for many seabirds, with surveys revealing that grey seal and harbour porpoises that have been spotted swimming through the area. Markham's Triangle has been subjected to significant trawl fishing in recent years, which has scarred the seabed.

=== Runswick Bay ===
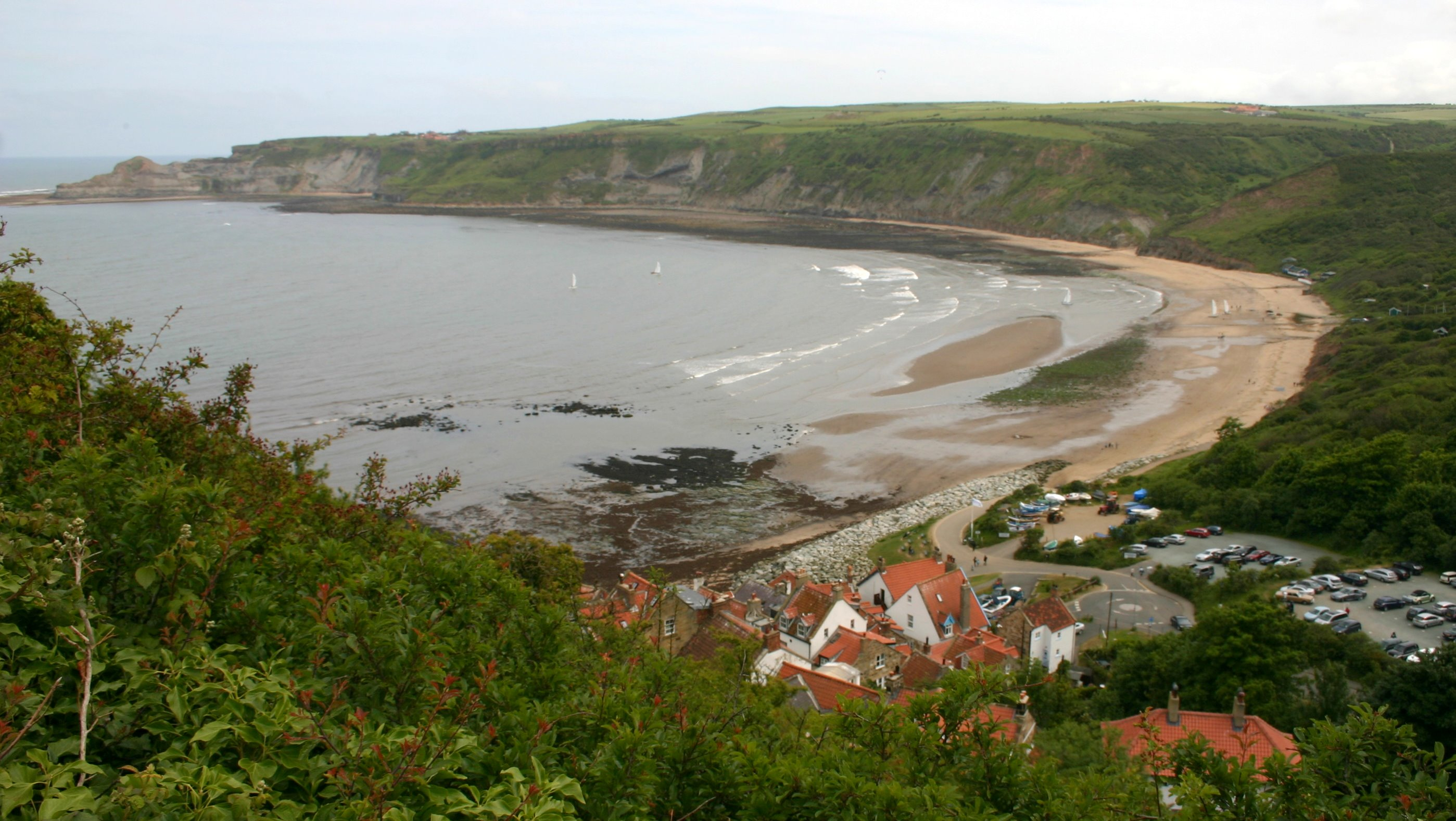
Runswick Bay

Runswick Bay was designated in the second tranche in January 2016, after CEFAS had conducted a survey of the Runswick Bay proposed site in 2014. Runswick Bay MCZ extends to 3 nautical miles (5.6 km; 3.5 mi) out to sea and covers and area of 26.13 square miles (67.67 km^{2}). It is recognised as being a Nationally Designated area of protection on the World database on Protected areas. The MCZ at Runswick Bay is host to shallow rocky areas which provide a refuge for crabs, anemones and starfish. The ground is also a good home for kelp and red seaweed. Mussels, limpets and barnacles are found closer to the shore, whilst the seabed provides for sponges, sea squirts and sea urchins. The MCZ also sees important visitors such as harbour porpoises and kittiwakes.

Deeper areas within the Runswick Bay zone are good spawning grounds for herring, sprat, cod and plaice. The designation mentions one key creature, the ocean quahog (arctica islandica), and ten types of rock and surface which are to be managed and protected; low energy intertidal rock, moderate energy intertidal rock, high energy intertidal rock, intertidal sand and muddy sand, moderate energy infralittoral rock, moderate energy circalittoral rock, subtidal coarse settlement, subtidal mixed sediments, subtidal sand, and subtidal mud.

Whilst there is no strategic plan on how to protect the MCZs, Runswick Bay has been a prohibited area for trawling "for decades". Dredging activity is also banned and netting is strictly controlled.

== Proposed MCZs ==
Proposed areas
Name	Date (Note: Date of recommended tranche)	NGN (Note: Net Gain number)	Coordinates	Area	Depth range
Castle Ground	2019	10	54.2491°N 0.3662°W	1.4 square miles (3.7 km^{2})	Sea level
Compass Rose	2016	12	54.2934°N 0.1528°W	213 square miles (552 km^{2})	160 feet (50 m)
Flamborough Head	N/A	N/A	54.1163°N 0.0771°W	0.36 square miles (0.94 km^{2})	Sea level
Silver Pit	2019	6	53.3242°N 0.4349°W	65 square miles (168 km^{2})	98 feet (30 m) – 230 feet (70 m)

=== Castle Ground ===
Castle Ground, located off the coast at Scarborough, was proposed by the wildlife trust for approval in the tranche 3 process. The site covers over 1.4 square miles (3.7 km^{2}), running from Scalby Mills past Scarborough, and is designated because of the shoreline habitats and bird species. It is named after Scarborough Castle. Castle Ground is home to "seaweeds, sea hares, crabs and molluscs such as blue-rayed limpets. Anemones, sponges, starfish and brittlestars. During winter, Filey Brigg supports half the English purple sandpiper population and is important for foraging seabirds, such as kittiwakes. There are 225 creatures belonging to ten different families recorded on the Brigg itself."

=== Compass Rose ===
Compass Rose lies 19 miles (30 km) off the coast of Yorkshire between Whitby and Scarborough. The site covers over 210 square miles (550 km^{2}) and is renowned for being subjected to the Flamborough Front, a "distinct temperature gradient between the waters to the north and south of Flamborough Head, where mixing of the warmer waters of the southern North Sea and the cooler waters of the northern North Sea occurs." The water in the proposed zone reaches a depth of 160 feet (50 m) and supports cup corals, anemones, sponges, mussels, worms, starfish and brittle stars. The site is an important spawning ground for plaice, herring, lemon sole and sandeels. Additionally, it is an important nursery for cod, whiting and sprat.

=== Flamborough Head ===
Flamborough Head is a designated Special Area of Conservation. The site is the most northerly outcrop of chalk in the United Kingdom. The chalk erodes slower on the north side of Flamborough Head to the south side, but it does form rocky outcrops, headlands and cliffs. The site was designated on 1 April 2005. The site has been a no-take zone for the fishing industry for some time, and the proposed zone would have extended 2,300 feet (700 m) out to sea.

=== Silver Pit ===
Silver Pit was put forward for the final tranche in 2019, but was not awarded MCZ status. The Silver Pit is a trench-like valley on the floor of the North Sea which was known to 19th century fishermen as being a good place to fish for flatfish such as sole and plaice. The deep trench is believed to have been carved out by glacial meltwater. The area has been tested and mapped, though this has been for possible hydrocarbons under the sea bed. The depth of the site ranges between 98 feet (30 m) and 230 feet (70 m). Silver Pit has a variety of wildlife; mussels, brittle stars, sea squirts, queen scallops, squat lobsters and pink shrimp. The site is a spawning ground for lemon sole, sprat, whiting, cod, Dover sole, plaice and herring. It provides food for puffins, common guillemots, kittiwakes, fulmars and northern gannets. Minke whales, white-beaked dolphins and porpoises have also been observed in the area.

== Future ==
In June 2020, a review stated that three areas of the Yorkshire coastline should become a strict exclusion zone for all types of activity including dredging, sewage dumping, drilling, offshore wind-turbine construction and catch-and-release sea fishing. The three areas would join over 40 others across the UK in becoming Highly Protected Marine Areas (HPMAs). Those noted for an HMPA were Markham's Triangle, Dogger Bank and Bempton Cliffs/Flamborough Head.
