= Gannet oil and gas field =

Scottish oil and gas field in the North Sea

Coordinates: 57°13′N 0°53′E

Gannet is an oil and gas field located in the United Kingdom's continental shelf in the North Sea. It is 180 km (110 mi) east of Aberdeen, and the water depth at the Gannet offshore installation is 95 m (312 ft). The field is located in Blocks 22/21, 22/25, 22/26 and 21/30. It is half-owned by Royal Dutch Shell (50%) and partly by ExxonMobil (50%) and has been operated by Shell UK Ltd since ‘first oil’ in November 1993. The Gannet A installation is the host platform for subsea tiebacks designated Gannet B to G. Like most Shell fields in the central and northern North Sea the field is named after a sea bird the gannet.

== The Gannet reservoirs ==
The Gannet reservoirs are located at a depth of between 1,768 and 2,728 metres (5,801–8,950 ft) and extend over several blocks. They comprises good quality turbiditic sands of a Tertiary age (Tay, Rogaland, Forties, Lista and Andrew Formations) and were discovered in 1973. The formation comprises a mixture of hydrocarbon reservoirs.

Gannet oil and gas reservoirs
	Location from Gannet A installation	Reservoir type	API gravity	Reserves	Wells
Gannet A	––	Oil rim with a gas cap	40°	68 million barrels of oil and condensate; 411 billion cubic feet of gas	11 wells
Gannet B	5 km north-west	Gas/condensate		3 million barrels of condensate; 139 billion cubic feet of gas	2 subsea wells
Gannet C	5 km south-west	Oil rim with a gas cap	40°	60 million barrels of oil; 140 billion cubic feet of gas	6 horizontal oil wells plus 2 gas production wells
Gannet D	16 km north-east	Unsaturated oil without a gas cap	40°	31 million barrels of oil; 30 billion cubic feet of gas	5 subsea wells
Gannet E	14 km	Unsaturated heavy oil without a gas cap	20°	23 million barrels of heavy crude	Subsea well with electric submersible pump
Gannet F	11 km	Unsaturated oil without a gas cap	40°	19 million barrels of oil	
Gannet G		Unsaturated oil without a gas cap	40°	13 million barrels of oil	2 subsea wells

== Design ==
The topsides for Gannet were designed by Matthew Hall Engineering which was also responsible for procurement and construction and commissioning assistance. They were awarded the contract in July 1989. Initially there were facilities for 15 oil production wells, two gas production wells and seven spare slots; there was also provision for 39 subsea risers. The production capacity was 56,000 barrels of oil per day and 4.0 million standard cubic metres of gas per day. There are four production trains for both oil and gas processing. Electricity generation is powered by two 21-megawatt Rolls-Royce RB211 gas turbines. The topside accommodation was for 40 people. The integrated deck topsides (9600 tonnes) are supported by a four leg steel jacket (lift weight 8400 tonnes). The topsides were fabricated by Redpath Offshore North; and the jacket by RGC Offshore at Methil.

== Operation ==
Oil from the platform wellheads and subsea wells is routed to one of the three horizontal first stage 3-phase separators. Oil from the separators is combined and fed to common second, third and fourth stage 3-phase separators. Processed oil is exported by pipeline to the Fulmar A installation and thence via Norpipe to Teesside. Gas from the second, third and fourth stage separators is compressed to the operating pressure of the first stage separators with which it is combined and further compressed. Gas from the Gannet A gas wellheads and from the Gannet B and C subsea wells flows to one of the two vertical separators. Gas is co-mingled with the off-gas from the oil separators is dehydrated through counter-current contact with Triethylene glycol. Gas is compressed for export to St Fergus via the Fulmar gas pipeline. There are also facilities for gas injection into Gannet A, B and C reservoirs and for gas lift to oil production wells on reservoirs, A, C, D, E, F and G. Produced water is treated prior to overboard disposal.

Oil export capacity is 88,000 barrels per day. Gas compression and dehydration capacity is 246 million standard cubic feet per day. Gannet A has a gas lift capacity of 130 million standard cubic feet per day and a produced water handling capability of 60,000 barrels per day. Shell have indicated that there is greater than 25% ullage of the total system capability available in the plant for additional third party processing and transportation. Peak production was: Gannet A 1 million tonnes per year (1999); Gannet B 0.8 billion cubic metres per year (1996); Gannet C 1.6 million tonnes per year (1993); Gannet D 0.5 million tonnes per year (1994).

== East of Gannet and Montrose Fields MPA(NC) ==
East of Gannet and Montrose Fields MPA(NC)
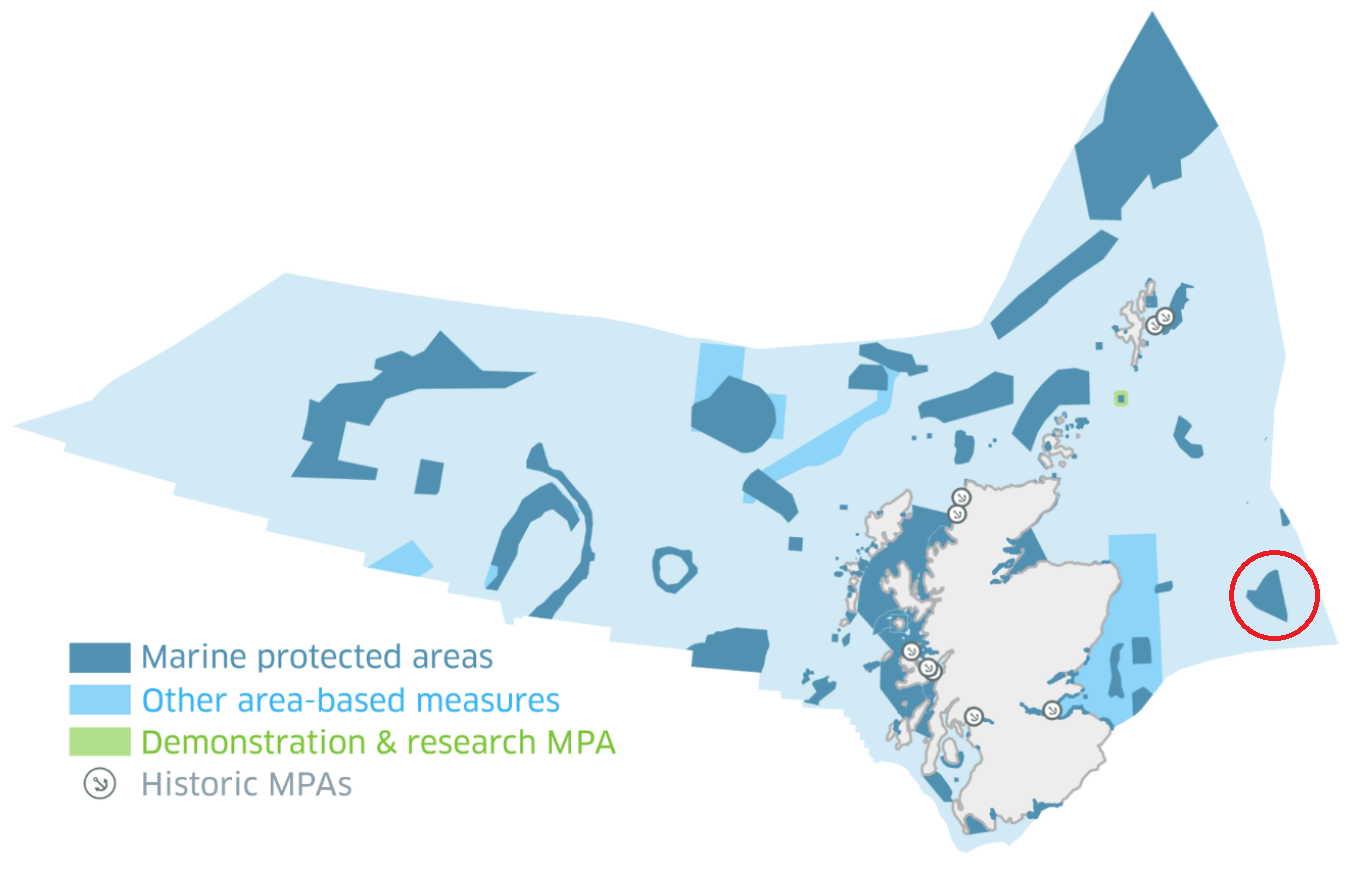
- Location and extent of the East of Gannet and Montrose Fields MPA (circled in red)
- Location: North Sea, Scotland
- Area: 183,900 ha (710 sq mi)
- Designation: Scottish Government
- Established: 2014
- Operator: Marine Scotland

In 2014 183,900 hectares (1,839 km^{2}) of sea to the east of Gannet and the neighbouring Montrose oil field was declared a Nature Conservation Marine Protected Area under the title East of Gannet and Montrose Fields MPA(NC). The sands and gravels that form most of the seabed within the MPA are the preferred habitat for ocean quahog, which bury themselves deep into the sand to escape predation. When buried ocean quahog can survive long periods of time without food or oxygen, and are one of the longest living creatures on Earth, having a lifespan of more than 400 years.

The MPA also includes a band of offshore deep-sea mud which form a habitat for many species of worm and mollusc, who live buried in the mud.

== See also ==
- Energy policy of the United Kingdom
- Energy use and conservation in the United Kingdom
