= Adjacent Waters Boundaries (Northern Ireland) Order 2002 =

Statutory instrument of the UK government

- Statutory Instrument
- Parliament of the United Kingdom
- Citation: SI 2002/791
- Territorial extent: Northern Ireland

Dates
- Made: 26 March 2002
- Commencement: 30 March 2002

Other legislation
- Made under: Northern Ireland Act 1998
- Amended by: Adjacent Waters Boundaries (Northern Ireland) (Amendment) Order 2020

Status: Current legislation

Text of statute as originally enacted

The Adjacent Waters Boundaries (Northern Ireland) Order 2002 (SI 2002/791) is a statutory instrument of the United Kingdom government, defining the boundaries of internal waters, territorial sea, and British Fishing Limits adjacent to Northern Ireland. It was introduced in accordance with the Northern Ireland Act 1998, which established the devolved Northern Ireland Assembly.

== Defining jurisdictions ==
The territorial waters defined come under the jurisdiction of Northern Ireland law, and are also used for defining the area of operation of the Northern Ireland Executive (including the Department of Agriculture, Environment and Rural Affairs) and other Northern Ireland Executive agencies and public bodies.

The territorial waters defined as not being Northern Ireland waters come under the jurisdiction of either Scottish law or English law. Because the order defines the territorial limits of the three separate jurisdictions, it comprises a piece of constitutional law in the constitution of the United Kingdom.

== Northern Ireland waters ==
Northern Ireland waters is a colloquial term which can refer to different sea areas, including:

- Internal waters and territorial sea adjacent to Northern Ireland. ("Northern Ireland" as defined in the Northern Ireland Act 1998)
- British Fishing Limits adjacent to Northern Ireland. ("The Northern Ireland zone" as defined in the Northern Ireland Act 1998)
- The UK continental shelf limits adjacent to Northern Ireland. (Part of the "Northern Ireland offshore marine region" as defined in the Marine and Coastal Access Act 2009)

== Application ==
The Order defines the maritime border with Ireland.

== Political impact ==
The order was referred to when Ireland made a claim for an area near Scandinavian countries' territorial waters.

== See also ==
- Partition of Ireland
- Irish Boundary Commission
- Scottish Adjacent Waters Boundaries Order 1999
- Welsh Zone (Boundaries and Transfer of Functions) Order 2010
