= Noss Head =

Headland on the north-east coast of Scotland

Noss Head MPA
- IUCN category IV (habitat/species management area)
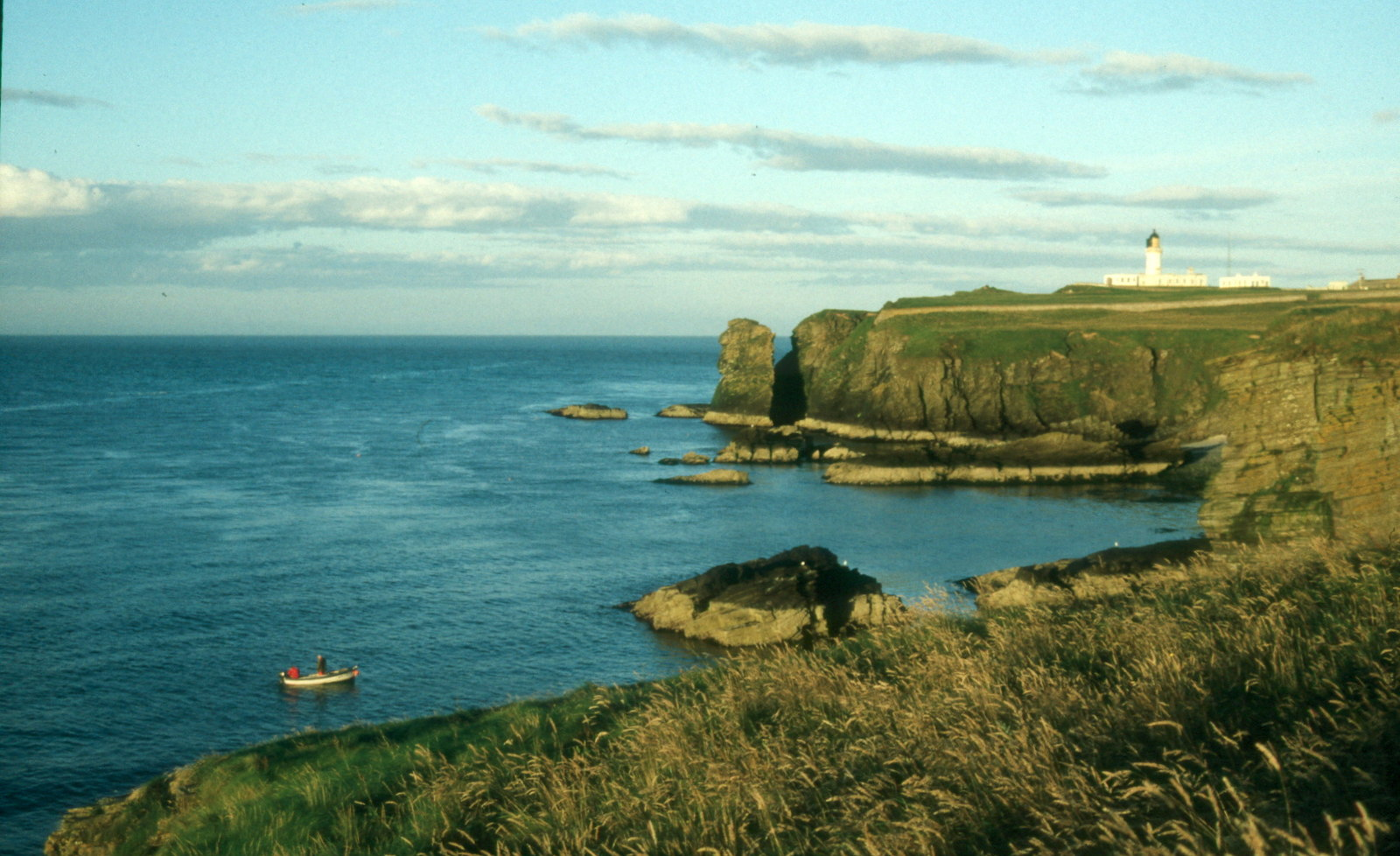
- Noss Head seen from the west

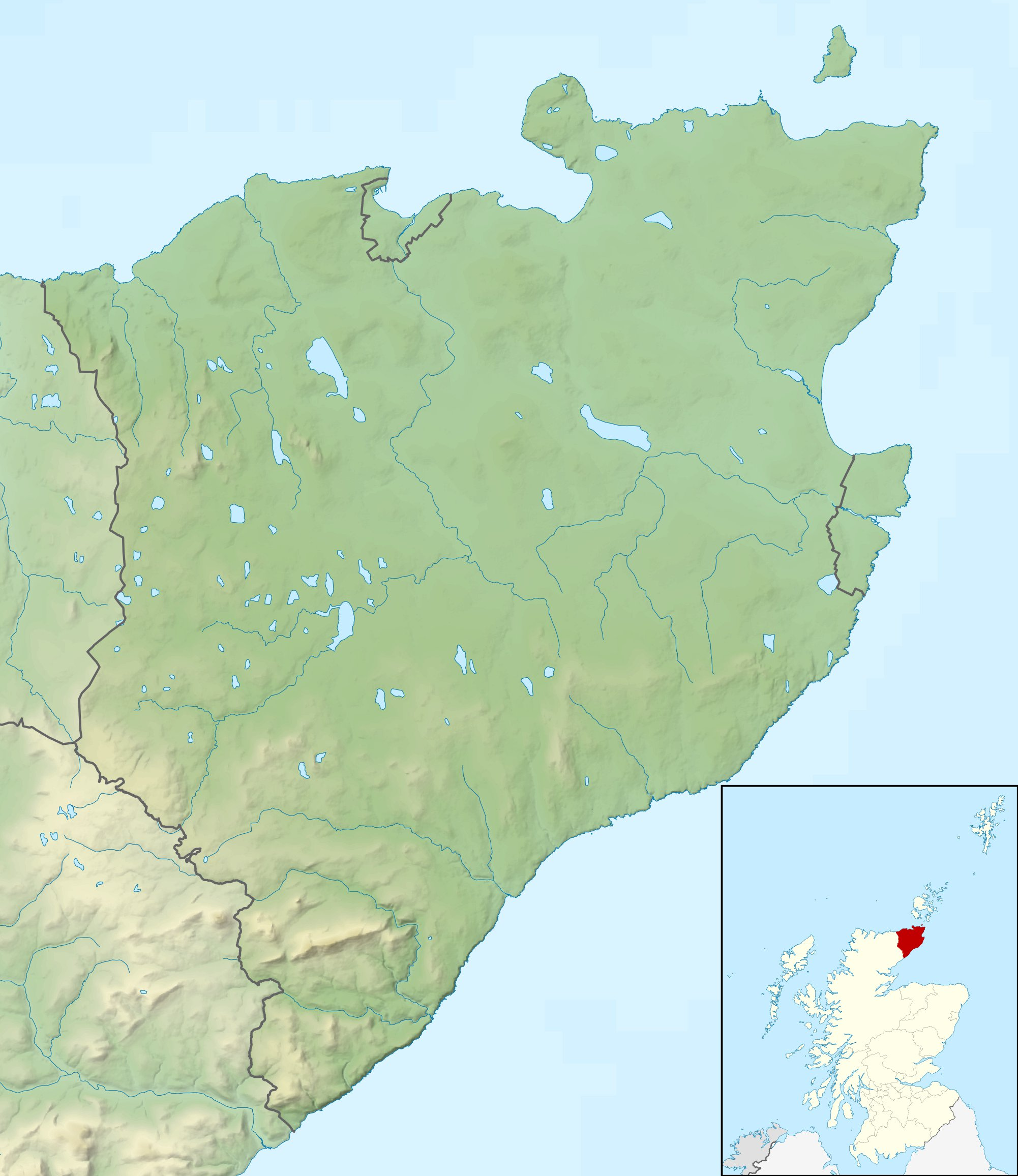
- Location within Caithness
- Location: Caithness, Scotland
- Coordinates: 58.479°N 3.0509°W
- Area: 800 ha (2,000 acres)
- Designation: Scottish Government
- Established: 2014
- Operator: Marine Scotland

Noss Head is a headland on the north-east coast of Scotland that overlooks Sinclairs Bay. It lies approximately 5 kilometres (3.1 mi) north-east of Wick in Caithness, in the Highland council area of Scotland.

Noss Head was first mentioned in the historical record as early as the 2nd century AD by Greek geographer Ptolemaios as Verubium Promontorium.

== Noss Head Lighthouse ==
Noss Head Lighthouse first entered service in 1849, and consists of an 18-metre-high (59 ft) cylindrical tower, which is painted white. It supports a single gallery and a lantern with a black cupola. It is notable as being the first lighthouse that was built with a diagonally paned lantern room. In 1987 the light was converted to automatic operation. The lighthouse is still owned and operated by the Northern Lighthouse Board (NLB).

== Marine Protected Area ==
A sea area of 800 ha (3.1 sq mi) off Noss Head has been designated as a Marine Protected Area (MPA) since 2014. It is home to the largest bed of horse mussels known in Scottish waters, which lies at a depth of between 35 and 45 m below sea level. Living amongst the mussel beds are many other species, including soft corals, tubeworms, barnacles, sea firs, and sea mats, brittlestars, crabs, worms and molluscs.

The MPA is designated a Category IV protected area by the International Union for Conservation of Nature.
