= South-West Deeps (West) =

Marine conservation zone off Cornwall, England

South-West Deeps (West) MPA
- Area: 1,824 km^{2} (704 sq mi)
- Max. elevation: 200 metres (660 ft)
- Min. elevation: 100 metres (330 ft)
- Designation: Marine Conservation Zone
- Designated: 21 November 2013
- Governing body: Marine Management Organisation (MMO)

South-West Deeps (West) MPA, along with the South West Deeps (East) MPA is an offshore Marine Conservation Zone (MCZ), approximately 230 km (140 mi) off Land's End, Cornwall, England, in the Western Channel and Celtic Sea. It was one of twenty-seven MCZs designated on 21 November 2013 by the Marine and Coastal Access Act 2009 and is a predominantly sandy area of the continental shelf, supporting molluscs and crustaceans living in and on the mixed and coarse sediments.

== Protected features ==
Subtidal course sediment, subtidal sand, subtidal mud (40.31 km^{2} [15.56 sq mi]) and subtidal mixed sediments are broad-scale habitats which are protected in the MCZ, along with the geologically important Celtic Sea Relict Sandbanks. Some of the ridges are up to 200 km (120 mi) long, 15 km (9.3 mi) wide and 50 metres (160 ft) high. The fan mussel (Atrina fragilis) is protected as a Species Feature of Conservation Interest and is found in only one other UK site, Small Isles (Scotland) MPA.
