= Firth of Forth Banks Complex =

Seabed features at the entrance in the Firth of Forth in Scotland

Firth of Forth Banks Complex MPA
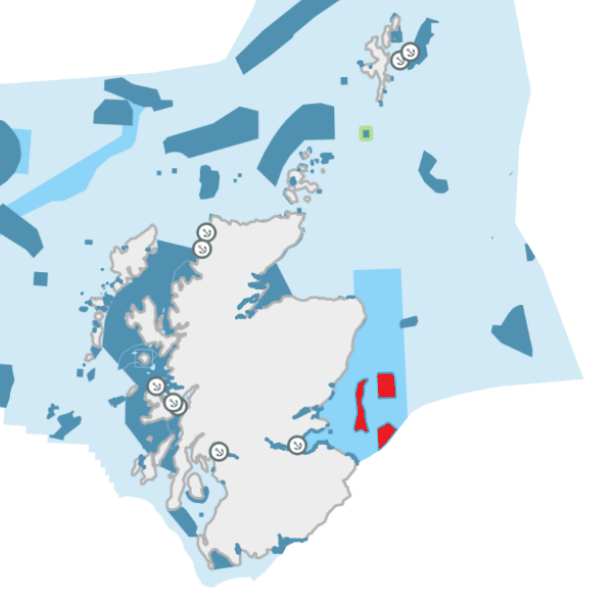
- Firth of Forth Banks MPA shown in red, in Scottish Waters
- Location: North Sea, Scotland
- Coordinates: 56°23′N 1°37′W
- Area: 2,130 km^{2} (820 sq mi)
- Designation: Scottish Government
- Established: 2014
- Operator: Marine Scotland

The name Firth of Forth Banks Complex refers to a complex of sand and gravel sea banks in the North Sea, lying at the mouth of the Firth of Forth in the seas off the east coast of Scotland. From south to north the banks are named the Berwick Bank, the Scalp Bank, the Wee Bankie and the Montrose Bank. Since 2014 the banks have been protected as a single Nature Conservation Marine Protected Area (MPA), which comprises three discrete zones covering a total area of 213,000 hectares (2,130 km^{2}) of Scottish Offshore Waters.

The seabed of the banks is formed of many different types of sands and gravels, and is highly influenced by the strong currents at the mouth of the Firth of Forth. This creates a highly productive habitat, which supports a rich array of sea creatures including crabs, starfish, flatfish, seals and dolphins; the Berwick Bank in particular is noted as an important spawning ground for plaice. The sand and gravel of the banks also support ocean quahog, a large and slow growing clam which have a lifespan of more than 400 years and are thus considered to be amongst the oldest living animals on Earth.

The richness of the seas here means that the banks are also important for seabirds nesting on the east coast of Scotland, which regularly visit the area to feed.

== Berwick Bank offshore wind farm ==
A 4.1 GW offshore wind farm is proposed by SSE Renewables to be constructed to the north of Berwick Bank, with the planning application submitted late in 2022. RSPB Scotland and four other conservation charities have objected to the proposal, citing the potential impact of seabirds. The project received a major approval in July 2025, on the condition that mitigations are made for the impact on birds. The project site lies between the three designated areas of the Firth of Forth Banks Complex MPA, and partially overlaps Berwick Bank.
