= Marine spatial planning =

Sustainable ocean use planning process

Marine spatial planning (MSP) also known interchangeably as Maritime Spatial Planning, is an ocean management instrument which aids policy-makers and stakeholders in compartmentalizing sea basins within state jurisdiction according to social, ecological and economical objectives in order to make informed and coordinated decisions about how to use marine resources sustainably. MSP generally uses maps to create a more comprehensive picture of a marine area – identifying where and how an ocean area is being used and what natural resources and habitat exist. It is similar to land-use planning, but for marine waters.

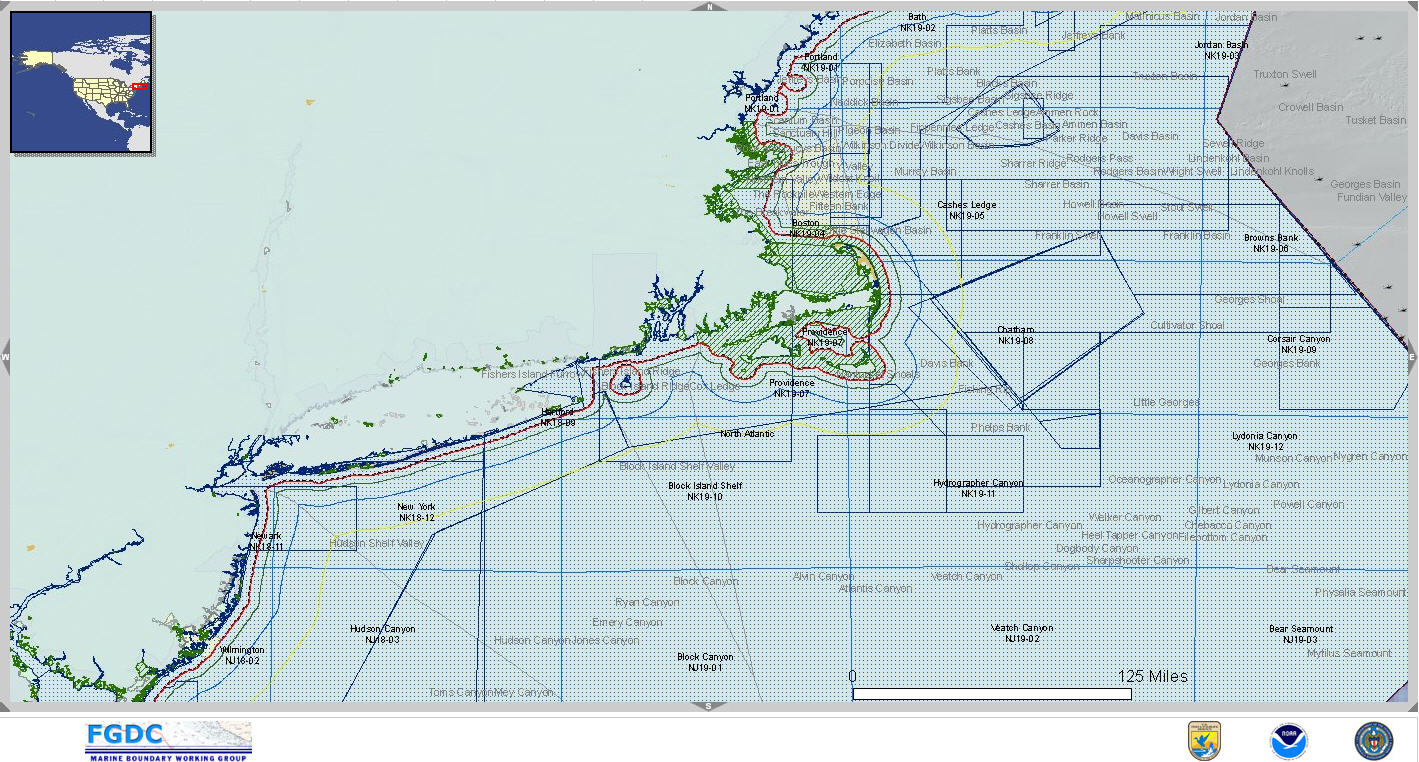
Example of MSP off Massachusetts

Through the planning and mapping process of a marine ecosystem, planners can consider the cumulative effect of maritime industries on our seas, seek to make industries more sustainable and proactively minimize conflicts between industries seeking to utilise the same sea area. The intended result of MSP is a more coordinated and sustainable approach to how our oceans are used – ensuring that marine resources and services are utilized, but within clear environmental limits to ensure marine ecosystems remain healthy and biodiversity is conserved.

== Definition and concept ==
The most commonly used definition of marine spatial planning was developed by the Intergovernmental Oceanographic Commission (IOC) of UNESCO:

Marine Spatial Planning (MSP) is a public process of analyzing and allocating the spatial and temporal distribution of human activities in marine areas to achieve ecological, economic and social objectives that have been specified through a political process. MSP is not an end in itself but a practical way to create and establish a more rational use of marine space and the interactions among its uses, to balance demands for development with the need to protect the environment, and to deliver social and economic outcomes in an open and planned way.

The main elements of marine spatial planning include an interlinked system of plans, policies and regulations; The components of environmental management systems (e.g. setting objectives, initial assessment, implementation, monitoring, audit and review); and some of the many tools that are already used for land use planning. Whatever the building blocks, the essential consideration is that they need to work across sectors and give a geographic context in which to make decisions about the use of resources, development, conservation and the management of activities in the marine environment.

Effective marine spatial planning has essential attributes:

- Multi-objective. Marine spatial planning should balance ecological, social, economic, and governance objectives, but the over riding objective should be increased sustainability.
- Spatially focused. The ocean area to be managed must be clearly defined, ideally at the ecosystem level - certainly being large enough to incorporate relevant ecosystem processes.
- Integrated. The planning process should address the interrelationships and interdependence of each component within the defined management area, including natural processes, activities, and authorities.

The IOC-UNESCO Marine Spatial Planning Programme helps countries implement ecosystem-based management by finding space for biodiversity, conservation and sustainable economic development in marine areas. IOC-UNESCO has developed several guides, including a 10-step guide on how to get a marine spatial plan started: "Step-by-step Approach for Marine Spatial Planning toward Ecosystem-based Management". IOC-UNESCO has also developed a world-wide inventory of MSP activities.

In order for an MSP programme to be successful, there is an crucial need to secure inter- and intra-sectoral cooperations - cooperations between sectors with diverging objectives such as social, ecological and economical - in order to ensure equal fulfillment of all objectives sought to be achieved at sea.

== Evaluation of Spatially managed marine areas ==
To evaluate how well a marine spatial plan performs, the EU FP7 project MESMA (2009–2013) has developed a step-wise evaluation approach. This framework provides guidance on the selection, mapping, and assessment of ecosystem components and human pressures. It also addresses the evaluation of management effectiveness and potential adaptations to management. Moreover, it provides advice on the use of spatially explicit tools for practical tasks like the assessment of cumulative impacts of human pressures or pressure-state relationships. Governance is directly linked to the framework through a governance analysis that can be performed in parallel and feeds into the different steps of the framework. To help managers, MESMA has developed a tools portal.

== Tools ==
There are a number of useful and innovative tools that can help managers implement marine spatial planning. Some include:

- USA MarineCadastre.gov
- Australia's Marxan Software
- SeaSketch, a collaborative geodesign tool for MSP
- UCSB's Global Map of Human Impacts to Marine Ecosystems
- Duke University's Marine Geospatial Ecology Tools
- Center for Ocean Solutions' Collaborative Geospatial Information and Tools
- MESMA Tools for monitoring and evaluation of marine spatial planning
- Scotland's National Marine Plan Interactive and Marine Scotland Information Portal
- Mid-Atlantic Ocean Data Portal
- New England's Northeast Ocean Data Portal

== Marine Spatial Planning in the European Union ==
Marine Spatial Planning within the context of the European Union is most often addressed as Maritime Spatial Planning - and thus for the sake of the section, the latter name will be used.

In the European Commission's 2002 Communications Report to the European Parliament called "Towards a Strategy to Protect and Conserve the Marine Environment", the very first mentioning of the concept Maritime Spatial Planning appears. The report urged for a need to plan sectoral activities within the sea basins in order to measure the environmental impacts and integrate protective measures. These EU-wide statements could have derived inspiration from the 4th conference of Baltic Sea Ministers for Spatial Planning and Development seeking to establish a transnational spatial planning cooperation including the management of marine and coastal areas. Maritime Spatial Planning officially became a central pillar to the European Commission's maritime policies with the publishing of the Integrated Maritime Policy (IMP) in October 2007. The following year, 2008, the European Commission introduced another marine focused document called a Roadmap for Maritime Spatial Planning: Achieving Common Principles – and in 2012 further development took place when the Commission adopted a Communication on Blue Growth: Opportunities for marine and maritime sustainable growth aiming to unlock the potentials of the blue economy. After more than a decade of MSP programs within the EU, it was decided to pass an EU-wide legislation on the matter in 2014, introducing the Maritime Spatial Planning Directive (2014/89/EU). MSP is presented as a vital environmental protection instrument of the IMP, as one of the central aims are to secure Good Environmental Status (GES) which involves the conservation of clean, healthy and productive seas.

=== The Maritime Spatial Planning Directive ===
According to the European Commission the MSP Directive serves as a framework to organize the many sectoral activities and industries taking place in the sea basins surrounding the European Union, such as fishing, aquaculture, nature conservation, shipping and renewable energy installations. The main objectives of the Directive are to reduce conflicts and increase border cooperation among member states with regards to improving efficient utilization of the sea basins, encourage investments and ensuring proper protection of the marine environment.

The MSP Directive introduced requirements for Member States to establish their own maritime spatial planning strategies and implement these by 2021 - especially targeting the 22 coastal Member States.

In the context of the European Union, we can identify four central policy drivers for the implementation of Maritime Spatial Planning: environmental legislation, legislation for renewable energy, fisheries regulation and frameworks for cross-sectoral and integrated management.

=== MSP in the EU's marine renewable energy sector ===
As MSP merely is an instrument aiming to organize sectoral activities in sea basins, a look into the renewable sector can give an understanding of the workings of MSP.

The European Commission highlights that the MSP Directive alongside the aims outlined in the Biodiversity Strategy is the primary legal framework for the achievement of the new marine renewable energy objectives within the European Union.

The EU is a leading developer of offshore wind energy and marine renewable energy. Marine Spatial Planning (MSP) can facilitate the development of marine renewable energy by streamlining licensing and installation processes, reducing conflict among maritime users, and providing greater legal security for stakeholders

=== Challenges of MSP in the case of EU's marine renewable energy ===
While MSP Directive has the potential to simplify the balancing of renewable energy and protection of nature, as it allows actors to divide the sea basins into space with different usages, the MSP Directive itself does have its weaknesses and thus cannot stand alone. The MSP Directive requires all coastal states to work out maritime spatial policies by 2021, however much discretion is left with the member states. The current EU legislation on the protection of nature, species and habitats, such as the Habitats and Birds Directives and the Water Framework Directive, possess derogation clauses, however there are no obligations for member states to actually apply these and thus balance out the creation of marine energy sources and protection of nature (van Hees 2021: 28–31). It is largely recommended that the spatial choices feed into the nature preserving Directives such as the Habitats and Birds Directives and the Water Framework Directive

The cumulative effects of offshore renewable energy are uncertain, as Cumulative Impact Assessments (CIA), Strategic Environmental Assessment (SEA), and Environmental Impact Assessment (EIA) often are implemented independently, why they to a large extend fail to paint a full picture of the negative impacts. The EU's MSP is criticized in this regard because when results of these assessments proves inconclusive the MSP Directive lays down the precautionary principle however without giving specification other than member states are to take "preventative measures". The usage of EIA is further criticized due to it lack of abilities to create assessments for tidal and wave energy installments. The ability to tackle the potential impacts of marine renewable energy sources such as tidal stream, wave energy and salinity gradient energy is a great concern due to uncertaint and the potential risks of sandbank erosions, underwater noise pollution from constructions, sediment starvation, industrial heat waste and physical damage to travelling species as well as aquatic environments. However, evidence show that small-scale energy project has fewer prospects of grave environmental implications, and main concerns lies with projets of large-scales.

A central challenge to the MSP within the European Union is the lack of standardized data collection and integration across databases. Therefore, improving this area of concern could help paint a greater picture of the environmental impacts and statuses across Member States' shared sea basins.

To further develop and strengthen MSP with the European Union, it is vital to improve informed policy-making on the area of ocean management. Developing quantitative and comprehensive environmental sustainability assessment (QCESA) tools under the Sustainable Marine Ecosystem Services (SUMES) projects, allows for an integration of Life Cycle Assessments (LCA) and Ecosystem Service Assessments (ESA), potentially simplifying decision-making process among policy makers, as QCESA highlight the trade-offs between various sectoral activities.

=== MSP and marine renewable energy in EU-Member States ===
A majority of research conducted on MSP activities are case studies of each Member State as much discretion is left with the Member States, meaning that MSP varies a great deal across the EU.

Belgium and the Netherlands can be seen as some of the frontrunners i MSP, as they both implemented own MSP strategies before EU-wide obligations to do so. From 2002 to 2005 the Belgian GAURFE project sought to deal with the use of the North Sea, and the project defined spatial scenarios clearly visualizing possibilities for the sea territory. Similarly in the Netherlands in 2005 the country's ministry on Housing, Spatial Planning and Environment published its first marine chapter in their national Spatial Planning Document, promoting efficient uses of marine spaces and drawing areas for shipping, military uses and ecologically valued areas. In 2013 Dutch ministries initiated a discussion on marine visions for the North Sea by 2050 involving cultivating the ecosystems whilst utilizing the waves and current to generate more renewable energy. In order to achieve such vision the North Sea 2030 Strategy was initiated. The Netherlands also presents an interesting challenge that smaller coastal Member States can face, as a smaller coastal line simply means less maritime space to delegate, which results in stricter MSP policies at risk for deprioritizing conservation of marine environment in order to achieve economic goals.

In 2009 France developed National Strategy for the Oceans, welcoming the emerging focus on blue economy and further elaborated on this approach in 2016 with an alteration of the national Environmental Code, officially implementing the concept of MSP. The tools for implementing MSP are given in the national document of the Sea Basin Strategies. In France, MSP practices currently focus on strengthening the concept of participation as listed in art. 9 and 10 of the MSP Directive (2014/89/EU).

Unlike the above-mentioned Member States, Spain has no overarching national maritime policy, however the country has set down sector-specific legislations clearly stating the management of marine spaces. Currently there are 72 areas which have undergone the Strategic Environmental Assessment (SEA), and been classified as suitable for wind farm installations with the ability to be restricted based on the environmental impacts of the installations (Garcia et al. 2021: 2–3). Strengthening Marine Spatial Planning (MSP) in Spain could elevate the importance of maritime zones on the national agenda, as demonstrated by countries like the Netherlands and Belgium, where a unified, long-term vision has supported effective marine area planning.

== Marine spatial planning in the United Kingdom ==
The Marine and Coastal Access Act 2009 defined arrangements for a new system of marine management, including the introduction of marine spatial planning, across the UK. Although the new system comprises the principles of marine spatial planning as articulated by the European Commission, it is commonly referred to in the UK simply as 'marine planning'.

Among the government's stated aims for the new marine planning system is to ensure that coastal areas, the activities within them and the problems they face are managed in an integrated and holistic way. This will require close interaction with town and country planning regimes and, in England and Wales, the new regime for nationally significant infrastructure projects (NSIPs) in key sectors, such as energy and transport.

=== The Marine Policy Statement ===
The cornerstone of the UK marine planning system is the Marine Policy Statement (MPS). It sets out the sectoral/activity specific policy objectives that the UK Government, Scottish Government, Welsh Assembly Government and Northern Ireland Executive are seeking to achieve in the marine area in securing the UK vision of 'clean, healthy, safe, productive and biologically diverse oceans and seas.'

The MPS is the framework for preparing Marine Plans and taking decisions that affect the marine environment in England, Scotland, Wales and Northern Ireland. It will also set the direction for new marine licensing and other authorisation systems in each administration. It is proposed that the draft MPS, which was subject to consultation in 2010, will be formally adopted as Government policy in 2011.

=== The Marine Management Organisation ===
In England, the new arrangements provide for the creation of the Marine Management Organisation (MMO), which started work in April 2010. The MMO will deliver UK marine policy objectives for English waters through a series of statutory Marine Plans and other measures. The first Marine Plans will start to be prepared by the MMO on adoption of the MPS in 2011. The UK Government's Consultation on a marine planning system for England document provides, for the benefit of the MMO and other interested parties, more detail on the scope, structure, content and process envisaged for each Marine Plan.

=== Marine Scotland (Scottish Government) ===
Marine Scotland is the government authority which will implement marine planning in Scottish waters under the Marine (Scotland) Act. A pre-consultation National Marine Plan was prepared in 2011 and the final Plan was released in March 2015

== Marine spatial planning in the United States ==
On June 12, 2009, President Obama created an Interagency Ocean Policy Task Force to provide recommendations on ocean policy, including MSP.

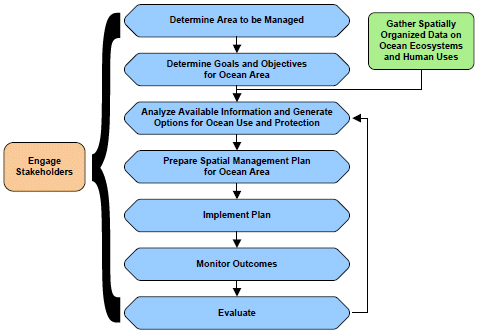
A graph showing the US marine spatial planning process

Some individual states have already undertaken MSP initiatives:

=== Massachusetts ===
The Massachusetts Ocean Act, enacted in May 2008, requires the secretary of the Massachusetts Office of Energy and Environmental Affairs to develop a comprehensive ocean management plan. The plan will be submitted to NOAA for incorporation into the existing coastal zone management plan and enforced through the state's regulatory and permitting processes, including the Massachusetts Environmental Policy Act (MEPA) and Chapter 91, the state's waterways law.

The goal is to institute a comprehensive approach to ocean resource management that supports ecosystem health and economic vitality, balances current ocean uses, and considers future needs. This will be accomplished by determining where specific ocean uses will be permitted and which ocean uses are compatible.

=== Rhode Island ===
The Rhode Island Ocean Special Area Management Plan, or Ocean SAMP, serves as a federally recognized coastal management and regulatory tool. It was adopted by the Coastal Resource Management Council (CRMC), the state's coastal management agency on October 19, 2010. The Ocean SAMP was then adopted by the National Oceanic and Atmospheric Administration (NOAA) on May 11, 2011. Using the best available science, the Ocean SAMP provides a balanced approach to the development and protection of Rhode Island's ocean-based resources.

Research projects undertaken by University of Rhode Island (URI) scientists provide the essential scientific basis for Ocean SAMP policy development. The Ocean SAMP document underwent an extensive public review process prior to adoption.

=== California ===
In 1999, the California state legislature adopted the Marine Life Protection Act. This action required the state to evaluate and possibly redesign all existing state marine protected areas and to potentially create new protected areas that could, to the greatest degree possible, act as a networked system. (Marine protected area designations in California include state marine reserves, marine parks, and marine conservation areas.) This effort does not meet the full definition of marine spatial planning since its goal was to cite only protected areas, rather than all potential ocean uses, but many of its elements (such as stakeholder involvement and mapping approaches) will be of interest to marine spatial planners.

=== Oregon ===
Two controversial ocean issues led to a marine spatial planning effort: concern by fishermen over the designation of marine reserves off the Oregon coast, and proposals by industry to site wave energy facilities in Oregon ocean waters.

An executive order directed the Oregon Department of Land Conservation and Development to work with stakeholders and scientists to prepare a plan for ocean energy development (also known as wave energy). This plan was then to be adopted as part of the Oregon Territorial Sea Plan.

The state has appointed an advisory committee and expects to adopt the plan in early 2010. It will include mandatory policies for state and federal agency decisions with regard to locating ocean energy facilities in the Oregon Territorial Sea.

=== Washington ===
In March 2010, the Washington State Legislature enacted the Marine Waters Planning and Management Act to address resource use conflicts. A report to the legislature providing guidance and recommendations for moving forward was produced in 2011, and based on the 2012 report, the legislature authorized funds to begin the MSP process off Washington's coast.

A state law required an interagency team to provide recommendations to the Washington State Legislature about how to effectively use Marine Spatial Planning and integrate MSP into existing state management plans and authorities. The team is chaired by the Governor's office and coordinated by the Department of Ecology. Other members include the Washington Department of Natural Resources, Washington Sea Grant, the Washington Department of Fish and Wildlife, and Washington State Parks and Recreation Commission.

== Marine spatial planning in Turkey ==
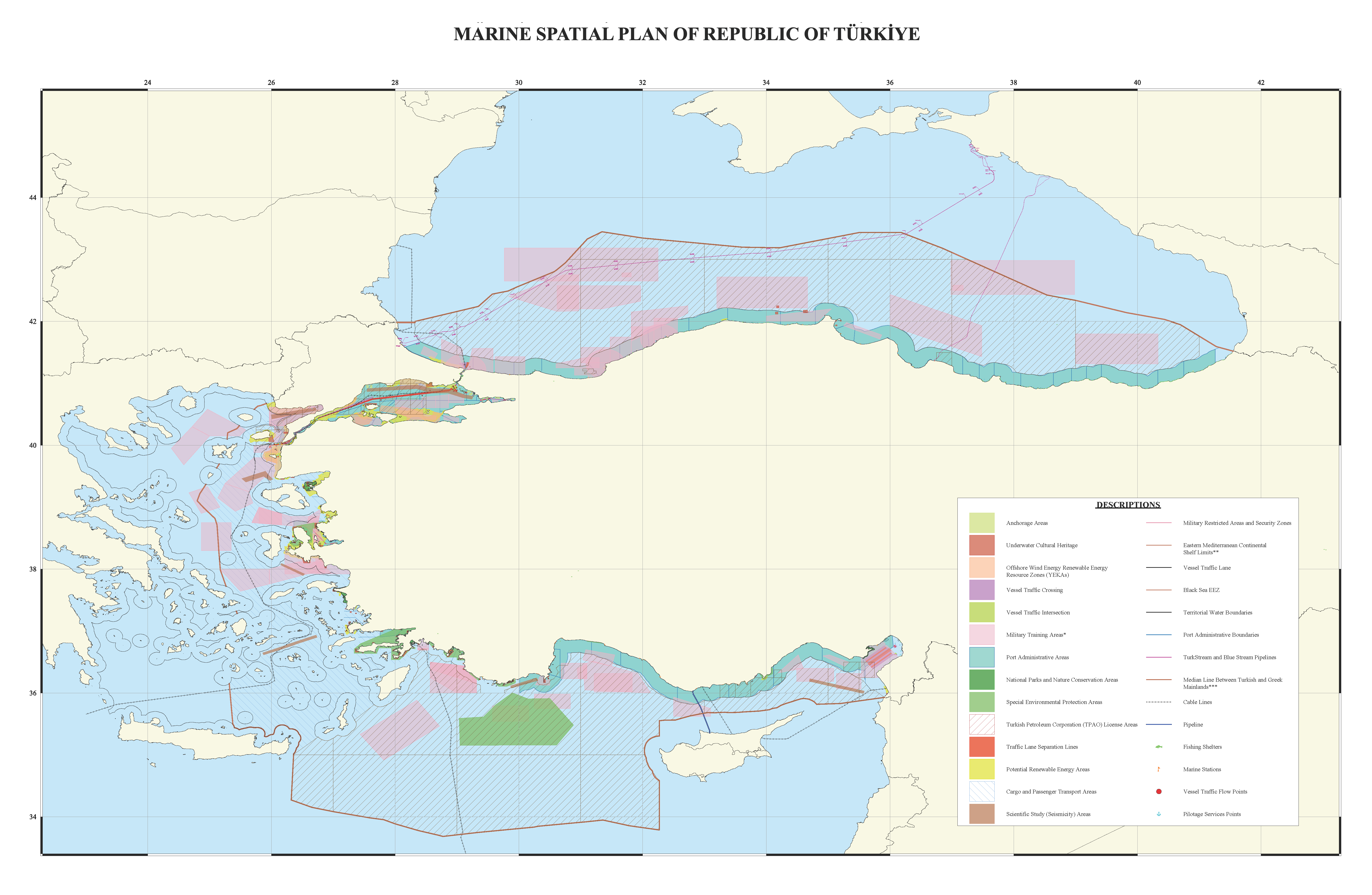
Marine spatial planning map of Turkey covering the Black Sea, Aegean Sea, and Eastern Mediterranean.Published by DEHUKAM – Ankara University National Center for the Sea and Maritime Law, on June 7, 2025

=== Legal and institutional background ===
A special Coordination Board, formed by a Presidential Circular, manages marine spatial planning (MSP) across the country. DEHUKAM (Ankara University's National Center for the Sea and Maritime Law) handles most of the necessary academic research and legal groundwork.

=== The "Blue Homeland" doctrine and IOC-UNESCO registration ===
Much of the country's spatial planning at sea revolves around the Mavi Vatan (Blue Homeland) doctrine.Fundamentally, this geopolitical framework asserts Turkish sovereign rights across surrounding maritime areas. In 2025, UNESCO's Intergovernmental Oceanographic Commission (IOC) officially registered the Turkish MSP plan. While IOC-UNESCO registration doesn't actually solve existing maritime boundary disputes, it does put Turkey's declared zones into the international administrative record.

=== The DMPTürkiye platform ===
DEHUKAM maintains the DMPTürkiye database, which makes spatial planning materials available to the public and relevant government bodies. It includes data on maritime traffic, energy initiatives, and marine protected areas, alongside related legal frameworks and interactive mapping tools. The system lacks statutory authority, functioning instead as a repository to support policymaking and cross-agency information sharing.

=== Key sectors in the MSP plan ===
The national framework divides the marine environment into distinct areas, each designated for specific economic and strategic purposes. The proposal focuses on several critical areas:

- Energy ventures, including both renewable energy projects and the extraction of hydrocarbons.
- Fishing and aquaculture ventures were established.
- Protected Marine Ecosystems.
- Shipping transport routes.
- Undersea pipelines and cables.
- Tourist destinations and marine research facilities.

=== International Implications ===
The plan's submission to IOC-UNESCO immediately drew a diplomatic response. Greece filed an official protest.

Greek officials contended that certain of the specified areas encroach upon disputed waters in the Aegean and Eastern Mediterranean. Turkish authorities, however, rejected this view. They maintained that the Maritime Spatial Plan (MSP) is strictly an internal instrument, intended for economic and environmental management. It is not, they emphasized, a clandestine effort to alter international borders.

== See also ==
- Land use planning
- Marine Park
- Marine Protected Area
- Zoning

== External links and references ==
- UNESCO International Ocean Council MSP Guide
- NOAA's MSP Information Site
- Marine Spatial Planning from Plymouth Marine Institute
- White House Memorandum creating Interagency Ocean Policy Task Force
- MESMA Toolbox for monitoring and evaluation of marine spatial planning
