= Geikie Slide =

Seabed feature in the North Atlantic

Geikie Slide and Hebridean Slope MPA
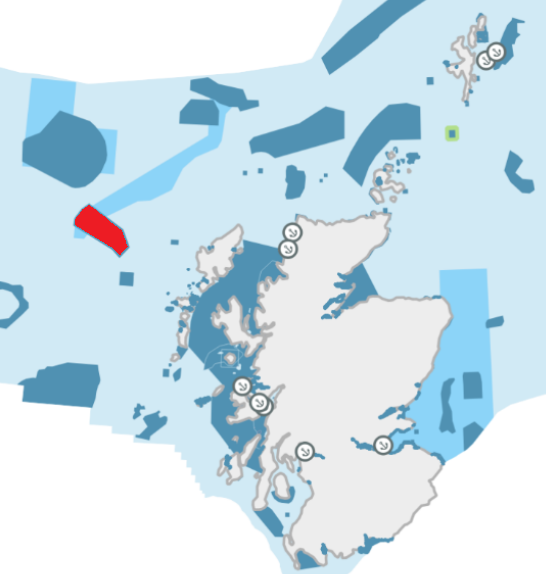
- The location and extent of the Geikie Slide and Hebridean Slope MPA, shown in red
- Location: North Atlantic, Scotland
- Coordinates: 58°22′N 9°10′W
- Area: 2,215 km^{2} (855 sq mi)
- Designation: Scottish Government
- Established: 2014
- Operator: Marine Scotland

The Geikie Slide is a submarine landslide on the seabed of the North Atlantic Ocean to the northwest of Scotland. The slide occurs in a region known as the Hebridean Slope, the continental slope where the seabed drops from the continental shelf surrounding Britain (a depth of c. 200 m) into the deep ocean (a depth of c.1800 m). Since 2014 an area of 2,215 square kilometres (855 sq mi) has been designated as a Nature Conservation Marine Protected Area under the name Geikie Slide and Hebridean Slope MPA.

The Geikie Slide is named after the Scottish geologist, Sir Archibald Geikie.

The ecology of the Hebridean Slope region alters with the descent into deeper, with the sands and gravels of the continental shelf giving way to mud at lower depths. The bottom of the slope provides a habitat for creatures such as mud shrimp and deep sea crab, which build burrows in the mud. Sea urchin, sea spider, and deep sea worms are also found here, and the area is a breeding ground for fish such as blue ling.
