= South West Deeps (East) MPA =

Offshore Marine Conservation Zone in UK

South-West Deeps (West)
- Area: 4,676 km^{2} (1,805 sq mi)
- Max. elevation: 750 m
- Min. elevation: 150 m
- Designation: Marine Conservation Zone
- Designated: 31 May 2019
- Governing body: Marine Management Organisation (MMO)

South-West Deeps (East), along with the adjoining the South-West Deeps (West), is an offshore Marine Conservation Zone (MCZ), approximately 190 km off Land's End, Cornwall. It was designated on 31 May 2019 by the Marine and Coastal Access Act 2009 and is a predominantly sandy area of the continental shelf, supporting molluscs and crustaceans living on and in mixed and coarse sediments.

== Geography ==
South-West Deeps (East) covers an area of 4,676 square kilometres (1,805 sq mi) in the Western Channel and Celtic Sea, and has a maximum depth of 750 metres (2,460 ft). The eastern boundary is 190 kilometres (120 mi) off the Land's End peninsula. Subtidal sand with areas of subtidal coarse sediment dominate the seabed and there is an area of deep-sea bed in the south. A geological feature is the Celtic Sea Relict Sandbanks, which are among the largest and deepest shelf sand ridges in UK waters and is one of two MPAs to protect deep-sea bed habitats outside of Scotland.

The MCZ protects various species including clams, cockles, burrowing marine worms and species of flatfish such as sole and plaice.

== Fishing ==
On 1 September 2022, Greenpeace UK dropped eighteen limestone boulders onto the seabed 118 miles (190 km) off the coast, to stop bottom trawling in part of the MCZ. Greenpeace claims there is no protection for the MCZ from industrial fishing and that it is one of the most heavily fished of the Marine Protected Areas (MPA). Greenpeace UK claim that in the previous 18 months, 19,000 hours of fishing occurred in the South-West Deeps, of which 3,370 hours was bottom trawling. Of the industrial fishing vessels in the area, 53% were French, 30% Spain and 9% British. The move was criticised by the Marine Management Organisation (MMO) which said Greenpeace UK took part in an unlicenced activity which could put fishermen lives at risk and they were ″delivering accelerated protection measures within Marine Protection Areas.″
