= Faroe–Shetland Channel =

Area of the north Atlantic to the north of Scotland

Faroe-Shetland Sponge Belt MPA
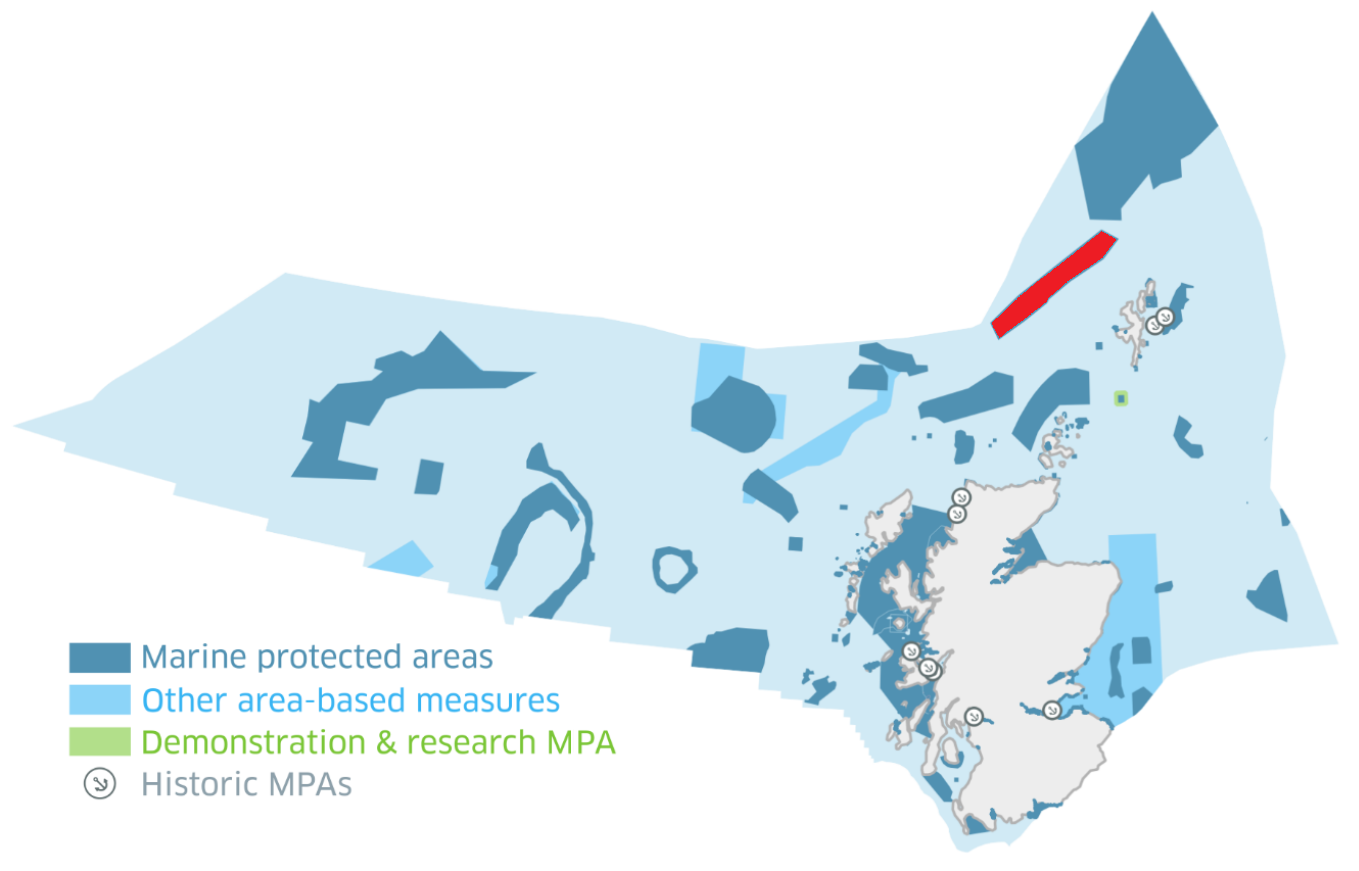
- Faroe-Shetland Sponge Belt MPA shown in red, in Scottish Waters
- Location: North Atlantic, Scotland
- Coordinates: 61°22′N 3°38′W
- Area: 5,278 km^{2} (2,038 sq mi)
- Established: 2014
- Governing body: Joint Nature Conservation Committee (JNCC)

North-east Faroe-Shetland Channel MPA
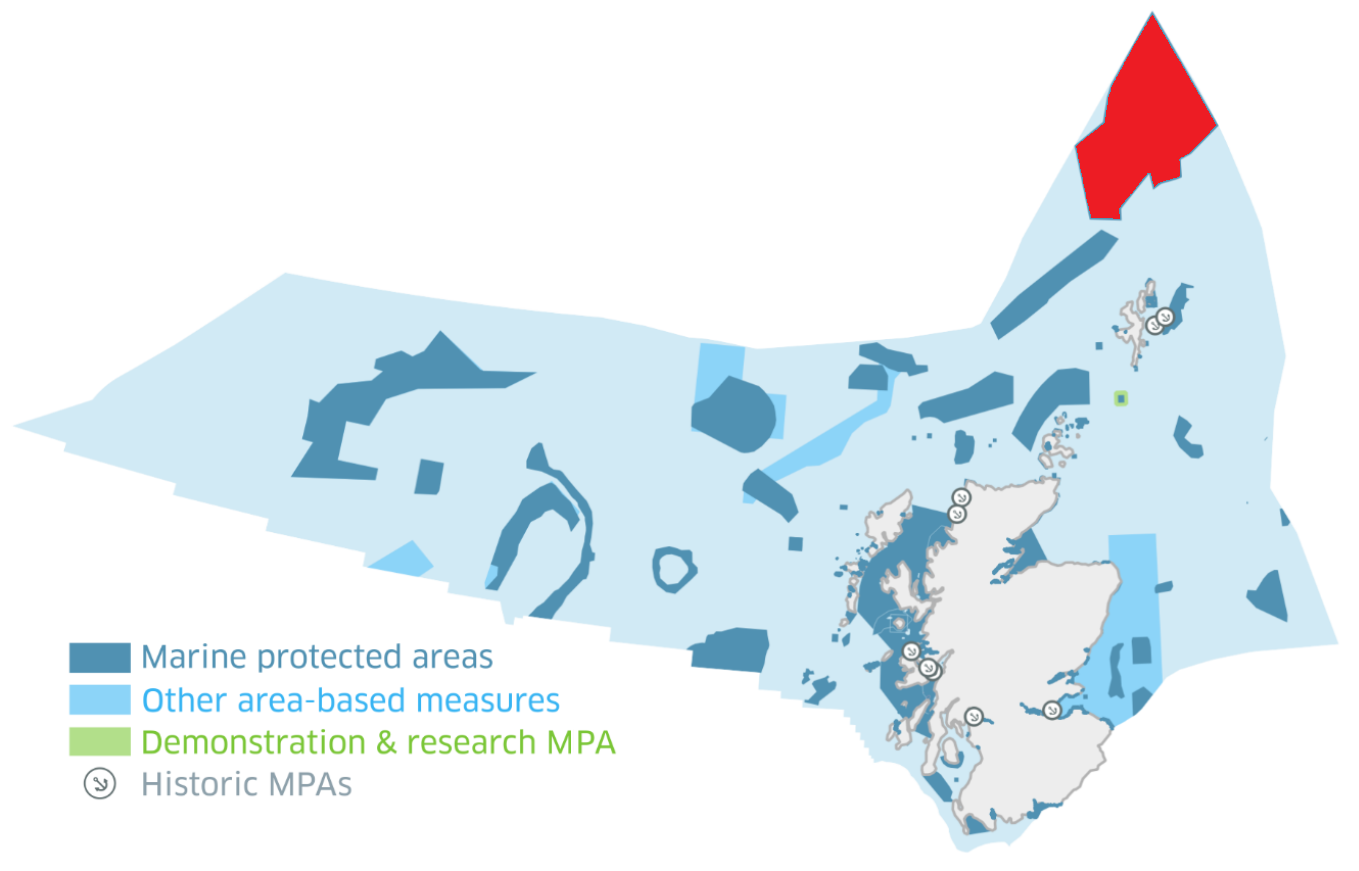
- North-east Faroe-Shetland Channel MPA shown in red, in Scottish Waters
- Location: North Atlantic, Scotland
- Area: 23,682 km^{2} (9,144 sq mi)
- Established: 2014
- Governing body: JNCC

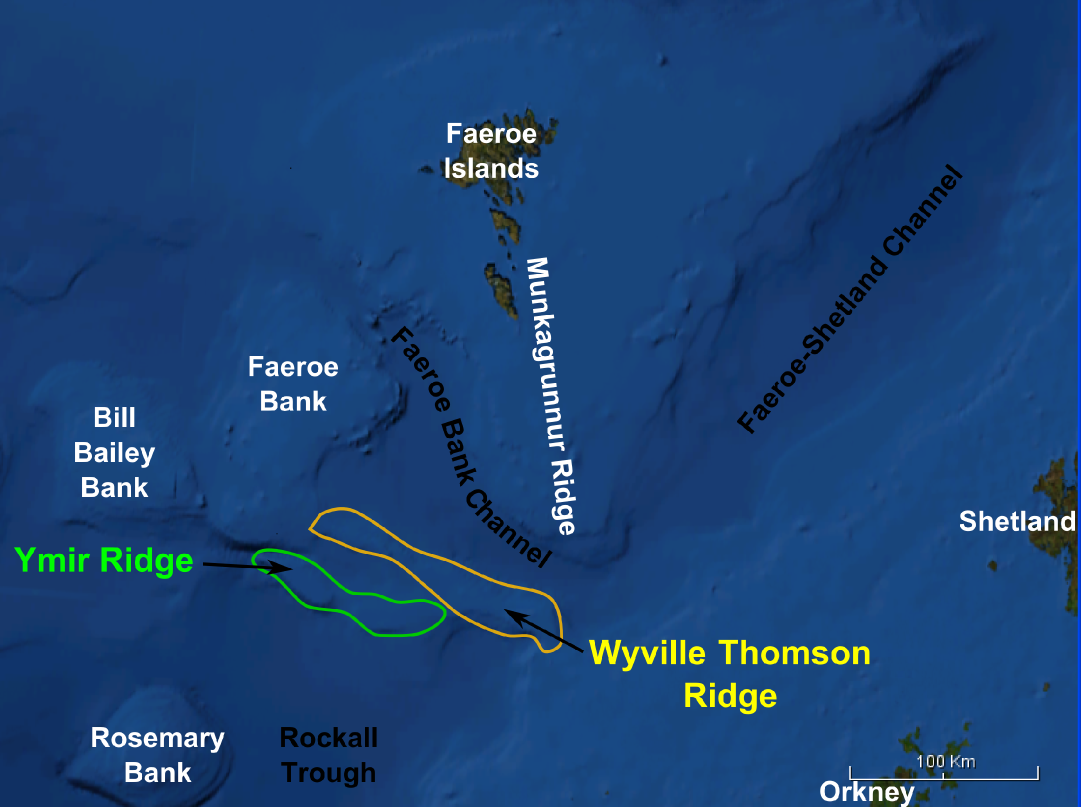
Map of bathymetric features of the Atlantic NW of Scotland

The Faroe–Shetland Channel is stretch of the North Atlantic lying between the two island groups of Shetland and the Faroe Islands. The channel is a rift basin that separates the Scottish and the Faroese continental shelves, and has a maximum depth of 1900 m, compared to the surrounding seabed which mostly lies at 200 m. It was first noted by Charles Wyville Thomson during the mid-nineteenth century.

Strategically, the channel forms part of the GIUK gap.

== Nature and conservation ==
Since 2014 two parts of the channel lying with Scottish Offshore Waters have been designated as Nature Conservation Marine Protected Areas:

- The Faroe-Shetland Sponge Belt MPA covers 527,800 hectares (5,278 km^{2}) in an region of sea where the mixing of relatively warmer North Atlantic water with sub-zero deep water from the Norwegian Sea leads to a diverse range of sea life in the area, including fields of slow-growing deep-sea sponges that are a key feature of the MPA designation. The sponges, which are found on the slopes of the channel at depths of between 400 and 600 m, provide a sheltered habitat that supports creatures such as brittlestars, squat lobsters and burrowing heart urchins. Sand and gravel beds within the channel also support ocean quahog, a large and slow growing clam which have a lifespan of more than 400 years and are thus considered to be amongst the oldest living animals on Earth.
- The North-east Faroe–Shetland Channel MPA covers 2,368,200 hectares (23,682 km^{2}) at the far northern edge of Scotland's sea area. This part of the channel is considered to be an important migratory route for marine mammals such as fin and sperm whales. This part of the channel is also of note for its geological features, which include a series of deep-water mud volcanoes known as the pilot whale diapirs.

== See also ==
- Wyville Thomson Ridge
