= Blackwater, Crouch, Roach and Colne Estuaries Marine Conservation Zone =

Marine Conservation Zone in Essex, England

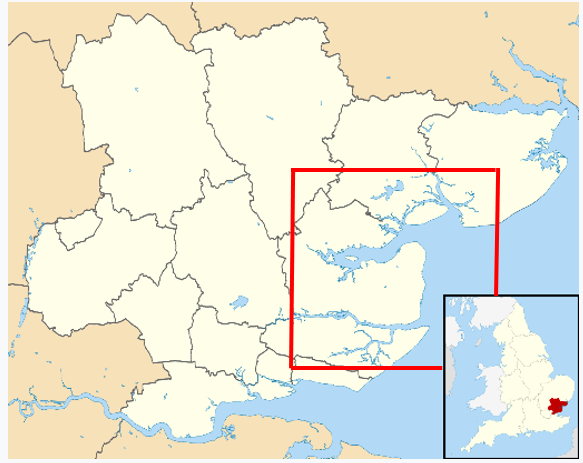
Essex Region UK, Red box highlights BCRC MCZ

Blackwater, Crouch, Roach and Colne Estuaries is a Marine Conservation Zone (MCZ), located in Essex, England. It includes the Blackwater, Colne, Crouch and Roach estuaries as well as the coast between them. It extends from the mean high water mark to where the estuary mouths join the North Sea. With a total area of 284 square kilometres (110 sq mi), it the largest inshore MCZ in England.

== Marine Conservation Zones ==
Marine Conservation Zones are marine areas that are designated in order to protect particular nationally important, rare or threatened species and habitats. MCZ's are usually put in place to protect the named species or habitats from potentially damaging activities. Restrictions will differ between different MCZ's. This depends on which features are at risk and in need of protecting.

There are about 50 MCZs in waters around England. You can see where the zones are on JNCC’s interactive map. One hundred and twenty-seven sites for Marine Conservation Zones were recommended to the government in August 2011. The first 27 of these areas were designated in November 2013. A further 23 sites were designated in the second phase in January 2016, this brought the total area protected by MZC's to 7,886 square miles. A third phase due to be designated in 2018/19 will aim to complete the 'UK Blue Belt'. Similar schemes are operating across the UK to contribute to a wider UK wide network of marine protected areas.

== Designation Features ==
The Blackwater, Crouch, Roach and Colne Estuaries MCZ has been designated for four specific features:

- Native oyster (Ostrea edulis) beds: Recover to favourable condition
- Native oyster (Ostrea edulis): Recover to favourable condition
- Intertidal mixed sediments: Maintain in favourable condition
- Clacton Cliffs and Foreshore: Maintain in favourable condition

Research carried out between 2011 and 2013 by a wide variety of organisations, including; ZSL, Essex Wildlife Trust, University of Essex and the Blackwater Oysterman’s Association, ensured that the native oyster and the habitat its beds provide are listed among the key features. BCRC MCZ is the only site in the UK designated for protection of native oyster beds (the habitat). Within the MZC and as part of the UK’s Biodiversity Action Plan, restoration activities are underway through the Essex Native Oyster Restoration Initiative (ENORI) to restore native oysters, the species, and the native oyster beds, the habitat.

BCRC MCZ protects one of the largest estuaries in the East of England and the largest tidal river in Essex, the Blackwater. The BCRC MCZ already has a number of overlaying designations within the area including Sites of Special Scientific Interest, the Essex Estuaries Special Area of Conservation and Mid Essex coast Special Protection Area. These existing sites protect extensive areas of mudflats and saltmarsh, which support a wide range of species including internationally and nationally important numbers of waterfowl such as Brent Goose and Curlew. Ongoing restoration and conservation work in the BCRC MCZ aims to build upon these existing designations, offering protection to the native oysters, native oyster beds, the Intertidal mixed sediment and Clacton Cliffs and Foreshore.
