= Marine (Scotland) Act 2010 =

Act of the Scottish Parliament

Marine (Scotland) Act 2010 (Note: Section 168(1).)
- Act of the Scottish Parliament
- Scottish Parliament
- Long title: An Act of the Scottish Parliament to make provision in relation to functions and activities in the Scottish marine area, including provision about marine plans, licensing of marine activities, the protection of the area and its wildlife including seals and regulation of sea fisheries; and for connected purposes.
- Citation: 2010 asp 5

Dates
- Royal assent: 10 March 2010
- Commencement: various (Note: Section 168(2).)
Other legislation
Amends	Sea Fisheries (Shellfish) Act 1967; Fisheries Act 1981; Town and Country Planning (Scotland) Act 1997
Repeals/revokes	Conservation of Seals Act 1970
Amended by	Investigatory Powers Act 2016; Digital Economy Act 2017; Biodiversity Beyond National Jurisdiction Act 2026; Licensing Hours Extensions Act 2026
Relates to	Marine and Coastal Access Act 2009

Status: Amended

Text of statute as originally enacted

Revised text of statute as amended

Text of the Marine (Scotland) Act 2010 as in force today (including any amendments) within the United Kingdom, from legislation.gov.uk.

The Marine (Scotland) Act 2010 (asp 5) is an act of the Scottish Parliament which provides a framework which will help balance competing demands on Scotland's seas. It introduces a duty to protect and enhance the marine environment and includes measures to help boost economic investment and growth in areas such as marine energy.

== Provisions ==
The main measures include:

- Marine planning: a new statutory marine planning system to sustainably manage the increasing, and often conflicting, demands on our seas
- Marine licensing: a simpler licensing system, minimising the number of licences required for development in the marine environment to cut bureaucracy and encourage economic investment
- Marine protection areas: strengthened marine nature and historic conservation with new powers to protect and manage areas of importance for marine wildlife, habitats and historic monuments
- Conservation: significantly strengthened protection for seals and a new comprehensive licence system to ensure appropriate management when necessary
- Enforcement: a range of enhanced powers of marine conservation and licensing

== Reception ==
The Royal Society for the Protection of Birds, welcomed the new law but also called for it to be strengthened.

== See also ==
- Scottish Adjacent Waters Boundaries Order 1999
- Marine Directorate, the Scottish Government's marine management directorate
- List of acts of the Scottish Parliament from 2010
- Marine protected area (MPA)
- Conservation biology
- Fisheries management, fish farms
- Marine conservation
- World Commission on Protected Areas
- Marine and Coastal Access Act 2009, covering England and Wales
