= East Caithness Cliffs =

Protected area of cliffs and seas on the east coast of Caithness, Scotland

East Caithness Cliffs SPA
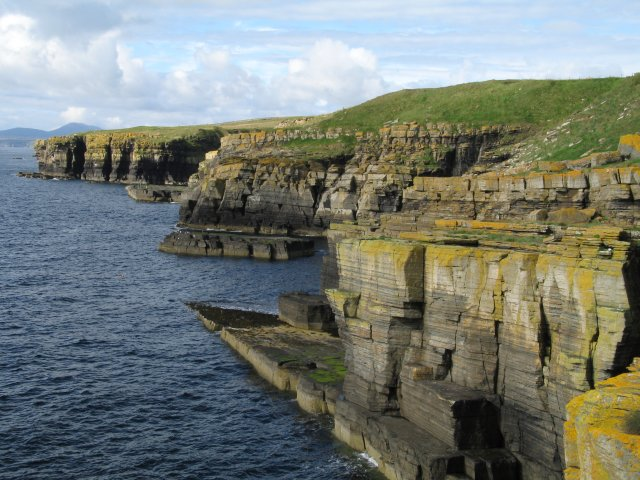
- The cliffs at Mid Clyth

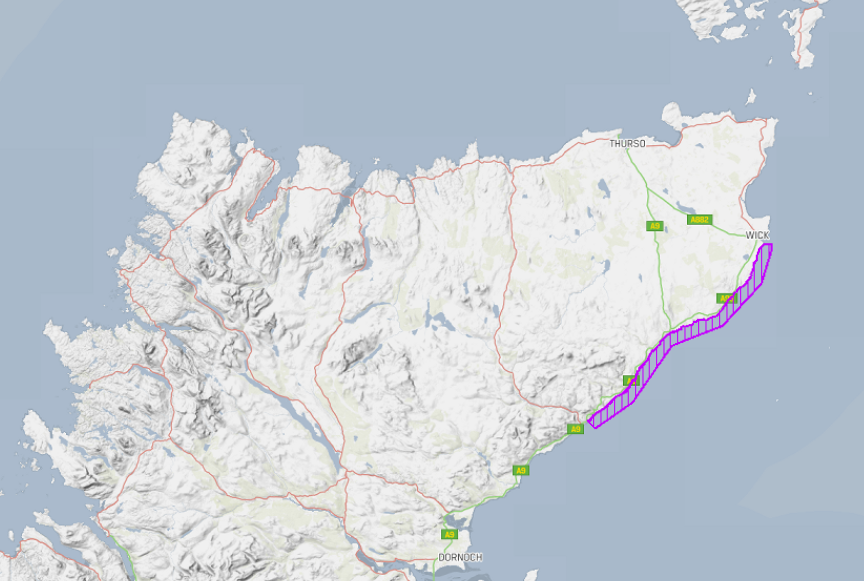
- Location and extent of the East Caithness Cliff SPA in northern Scotland
- Location: Caithness, Scotland
- Area: 11,696.38 ha (45.1600 sq mi)
- Established: 1996
- Governing body: NatureScot

The name East Caithness Cliffs refers to weathered sandstone cliffs on the east coast of Caithness in Scotland. The cliffs, which rise to 150 m at Berriedale, provide ideal nesting conditions for breeding seabirds, and are protected by several overlapping conservation designations:

- The East Caithness Cliffs Special Area of Conservation (SAC) covers the cliffs from the southern boundary of Caithness (a point about 4 km north of Helmsdale in Sutherland) to just south of Wick, an area of 457 hectares (4.57 km^{2}) in total.
- The East Caithness Cliffs Nature Conservation Marine Protected Area protects the sea up to 2 km from the SAC, an area of 11,400 hectares (114 km^{2}) in total.
- The East Caithness Cliffs Special Protection Area (SPA), which covers 11,696 hectares (116.96 km^{2}), includes both the cliffs of the SAC and the seaward area of the MPA.

The area is also protected by six separate Sites of Special Scientific Interest SSSI, which overlap wholly or partly with the other designations:

- Castle of Old Wick to Craig Hammel SSSI
- Craig Hammel to Sgaps Geo SSSI
- Dunbeath to Sgaps Geo SSSI
- Berriedale Cliffs SSSI
- Ousdale Burn SSSI
- Helmsdale Coast SSSI

The cliffs are of particular importance for seabirds, hosting up to 300,000 individuals during the breeding season. This is the most important area on the east coast of Scotland for black guillemot, with over 1,500 individuals breeding here each year. There are also important populations of common guillemot, razorbill, herring gull, black-legged kittiwake, shag, great black-backed gull, cormorant and northern fulmar.

The cliffs are also important for the plant species they support. The cliffs provide a range of habitats that are typical of northern Scotland, although lacking the extreme exposure of Cape Wrath or island locations. Species of note found on the East Caithness Cliffs include roseroot and Scots lovage, whilst meadowsweet is found in more sheltered areas. There are two small areas of saltmarsh in which can be found saltmarsh rush, and herb species are plentiful in ungrazed grassland and heathland areas on the cliff tops. In the southern parts of the area the climate is more moderate, and scrub has developed in gullies. Here can be found tree species such as willow, juniper, hazel, hawthorn and aspen.

The management strategy for the cliffs encourages light grazing of the grass and heathland in order to enable plants to flower and set seed whilst preventing bracken from becoming established. Muirburn is strongly discouraged.
