= Scottish Adjacent Waters Boundaries Order 1999 =

UK Statutory Instrument

- Statutory Instrument
- Parliament of the United Kingdom
- Citation: SI 1999/1126
- Territorial extent: Scotland

Dates
- Made: 13 April 1999
- Commencement: 1 July 1999
Other legislation
Made under	Scotland Act 1998

Status: Current legislation

Text of statute as originally enacted

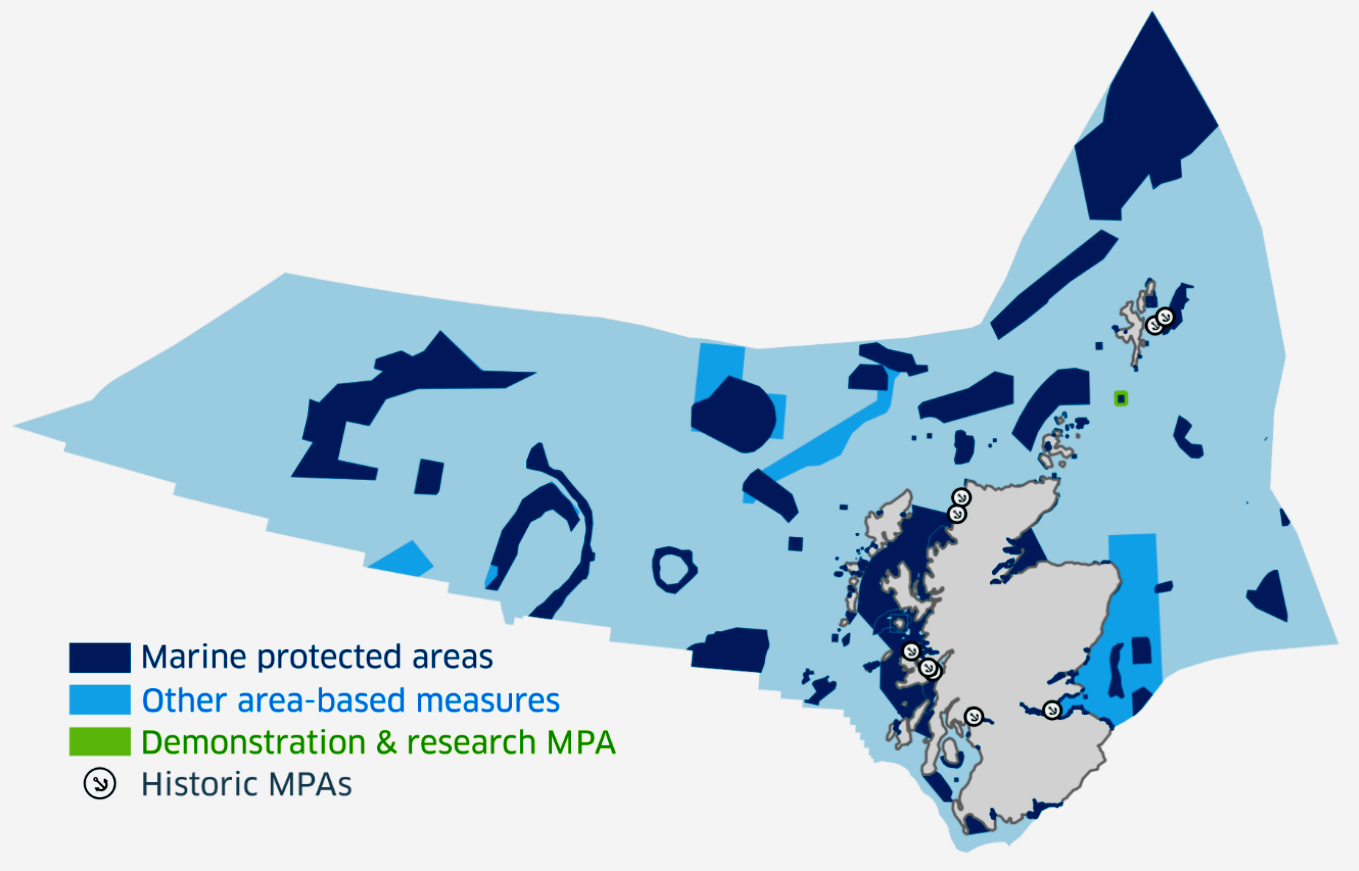
A map showing the location of Scotland's Marine Protected Areas highlights the extent of the Scottish zone and continental shelf adjacent to Scotland.

The Scottish Adjacent Waters Boundaries Order 1999 (SI 1999/1126) is a statutory instrument of the United Kingdom government, defining the boundaries of internal waters, territorial sea, and British fishing limits adjacent to Scotland. It was introduced in accordance with the Scotland Act 1998, which established the devolved Scottish Parliament.

== Defining jurisdictions ==
The territorial waters defined come under the jurisdiction of Scots law, and are also used for defining the area of operation of the Scottish Government (including the Marine Directorate), SEPA, and other Scottish Government agencies and public bodies.

The territorial waters defined as not being Scottish waters come under the jurisdiction of either English law or Northern Ireland law. Because the order defines the territorial limits of the three separate jurisdictions, it comprises a piece of constitutional law in the constitution of the United Kingdom.

== Scottish waters ==
Scottish waters is a colloquial term which can refer to different sea areas, including:

- Internal waters and territorial sea adjacent to Scotland. ("Scotland" as defined in the Scotland Act 1998)
- British Fishing Limits adjacent to Scotland. ("The Scottish Zone" as defined in the Scotland Act 1998)
- The UK continental shelf limits adjacent to Scotland. (Part of the "Scottish offshore marine region" as defined in the Marine and Coastal Access Act 2009)

== Differences with existing boundaries ==
The maritime boundary adopted by the order is an equidistant boundary. This differed from the boundary established by the Civil Jurisdiction (Offshore Activities) Order 1987 (SI 1987/2197) which defined a straight line border between Scotland and England in the North Sea along the latitude of 55° 50' 00"N.

No oil fields were affected by this change as the new boundary only applied to fishing and had no impact on reserved matters. Professor Alex Kemp of the University of Aberdeen argued that the movement of the line did not make much difference from an economic perspective, "because [these] are just a handful of fields, and [no longer] very important ones".

== Potential implications for Scottish independence ==
The Scottish National Party opposed the order and the methods used to calculate the boundary in the North Sea.

In 2015, the Scottish Cabinet Secretary for Rural Affairs and Environment, Richard Lochhead, wrote to the UK Government requesting a review of the order.

In 2001, Mahdi Zahraa of Glasgow Caledonian University, published a discussion paper in the European Journal of International Law detailing different methods of establishing an Anglo-Scottish marine boundary. The author notes that whilst the median line principle would apply as a starting point, a perpendicular boundary, derived from a new straight baseline on the east coast of Scotland and England, combined with an area of shared jurisdiction, would be an alternative equitable solution.

Supporters of Scottish independence such as Craig Murray have also argued for a perpendicular boundary based on a straight baseline.

== See also ==
- Anglo-Scottish border
- Adjacent Waters Boundaries (Northern Ireland) Order 2002, Welsh Zone (Boundaries and Transfer of Functions) Order 2010
