= Marine Directorate =

Directorate of the Scottish Government

Directorate overview
- Formed: 1 April 2009
- Preceding agencies: Scottish Fisheries Protection Agency; Fisheries Research Service; Scottish Government
- Jurisdiction: Scotland and Scottish waters
- Headquarters: Victoria Quay, Leith, Edinburgh
- Employees: 700 (2016)
- Annual budget: £64.7 million (2019-2020)
- Ministers responsible: Mairi Gougeon MSP, Cabinet Secretary for Rural Affairs, Land Reform and Islands; Jim Fairlie MSP, Minister for Agriculture and Connectivity
- Directorate executive: Iain Wallace, Director of Marine
- Parent department: Net Zero Directorates
- Website: Marine Directorate

The Marine Directorate (Scottish Gaelic: Cùisean Mara na h-Alba) is a directorate of the Scottish Government responsible for managing Scotland's seas and freshwater fisheries along with delivery partners NatureScot and the Scottish Environment Protection Agency. Between April 2009 and June 2023 the directorate was known as Marine Scotland.

== History ==
The Marine Directorate was established on 1 April 2009, merging two executive agencies (Fisheries Research Services and the Scottish Fisheries Protection Agency) and the Scottish Government marine and fishery policy divisions.

== Overview ==
=== Responsibilities ===
The Marine Directorate provides management and research of devolved responsibilities such as:

- Licensing of marine activities.
- Sea fisheries.
- Salmon and recreational fishing.
- Marine renewable energy.
- Marine conservation.
- Marine spatial planning.
- Scientific research including sea and freshwater fisheries.
- Enforcement of marine and fisheries law.

=== Staff, assets and budget ===
The Marine Directorate has around 700 staff, covering a range of professions including scientists, sea fishery officers, sailors, policy, administrative and professional/ technical staff.

=== Locations and Assets ===
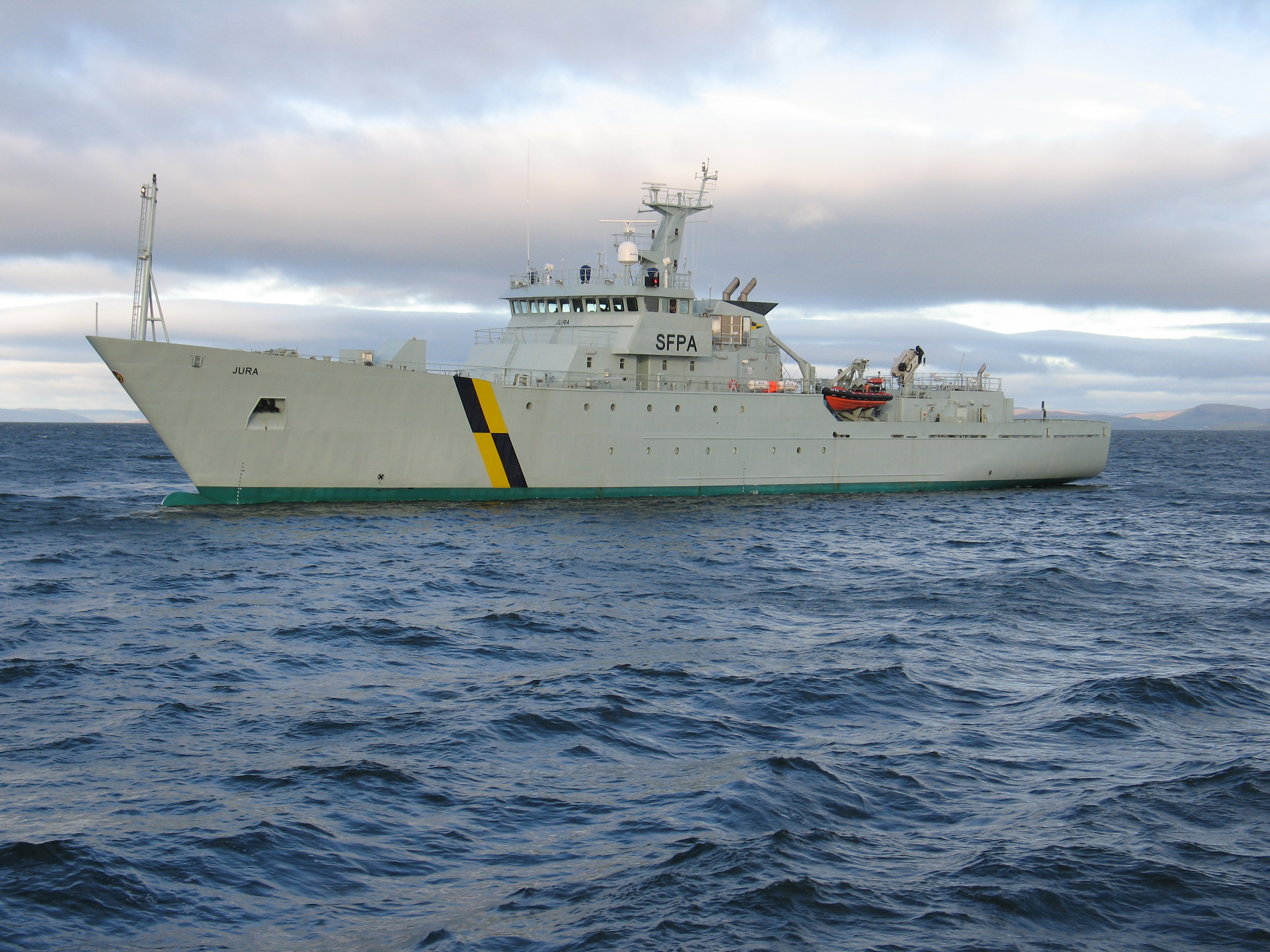
MPV Jura

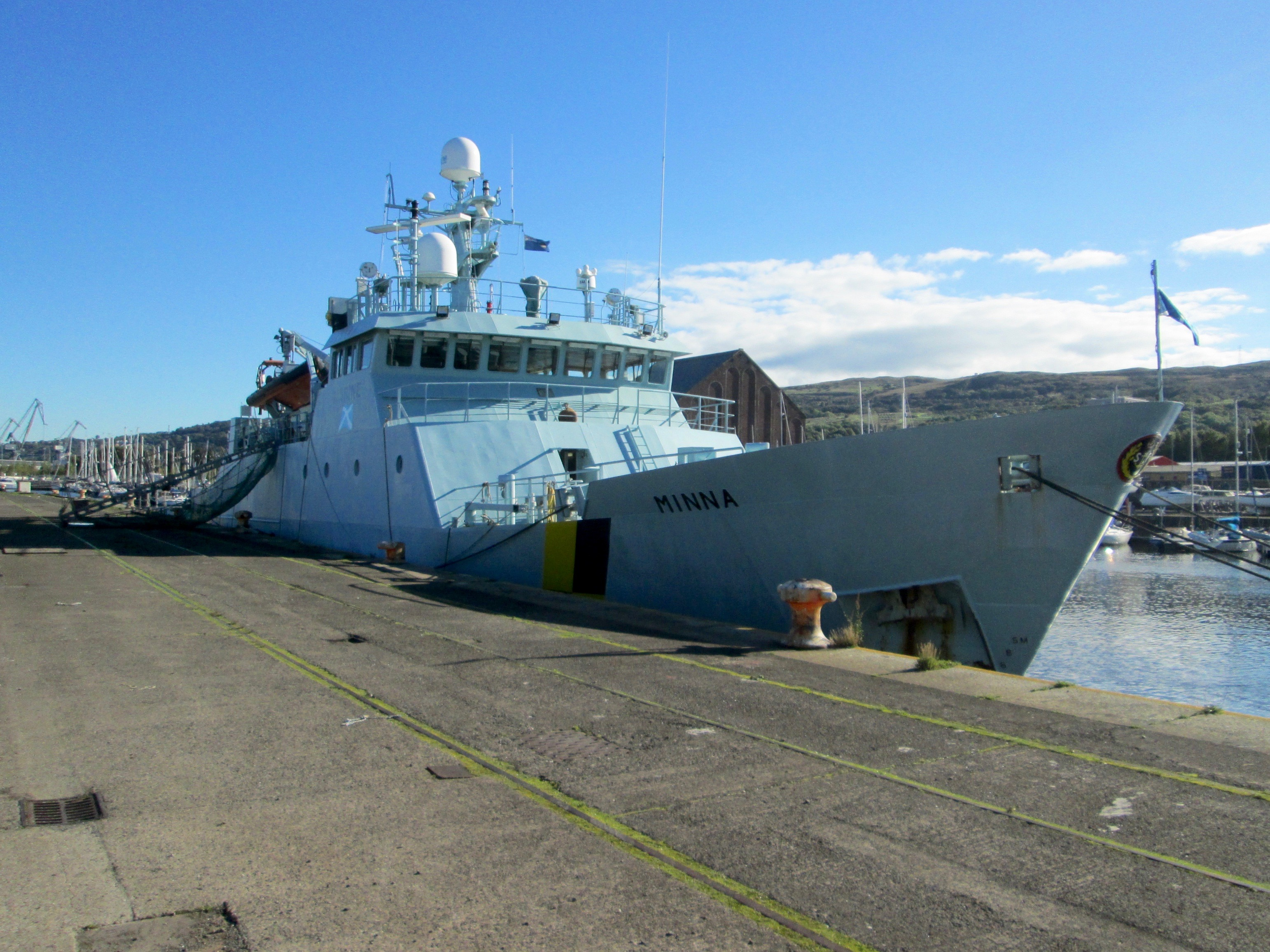
MPV Minna

Staff are located across Scotland including :

- Major Scottish Government offices, for example Victoria Quay and Atlantic Quay.
- The Marine Laboratory in Aberdeen.
- Freshwater laboratories at Faskally and Montrose.
- Fishery offices at Eyemouth, Anstruther, Peterhead, Fraserburgh, Buckie, Kirkwall, Lerwick, Scrabster, Kinlochbervie, Lochinver, Ullapool, Stornoway, Portree, Mallaig, Oban, Campbeltown, and Ayr.

==== Marine Research Vessels ====
The Marine Directorate operates two main research vessels which are fitted with a wide range of deployment and recovery facilities for fishing gear and equipment, scientific and environmental sensors, and data gathering systems:

- MRV Scotia (launched: 1998, length: 68.6 meters, service speed: 13 knots)
- MRV Alba-Na-Mara (launched: 2008, length: 27 meters, cruise speed: 8 knots)

Additionally, MRV Temora (launched: 1992, length: 10 meters, max speed: 10 knots) is used for sampling as part of the Long Term Climate Change Monitoring Programme.

==== Marine Protection Vessels ====
The Marine Directorate operates three Marine Protection Vessels (MPVs):

- MPV Minna (launched: 2003, length: 42 meters, top speed: 14 knots, tonnage: 718 g.r.t.)
- MPV Jura (launched: 2005, length: 84 meters, top speed: 18 knots, tonnage: 2,181 g.r.t.)
- MPV Hirta (launched: 2008, length: 84 meters, top speed: 18 knots, tonnage: 2,181 g.r.t.)

==== Surveillance Aircraft ====
Since August 2025, the Marine Directorate will no longer operate its previously owned aircraft. Aerial surveillance capabilities have transitioned to a cross-government arrangement, now delivered through the UKSAR2G service, operated by the Maritime and Coastguard Agency (MCA). This collaboration ensures continued high-quality aerial monitoring in support of our marine and fisheries enforcement responsibilities.

==== UK Fisheries Monitoring Centre ====
The Marine Directorate operates the UK Fisheries Monitoring Centre (UKFMC), on behalf of the four UK fisheries administrations. The UKFMC acts as the UK single-point-of-contact for manual reporting of ERS, VMS and other EU/national fisheries schemes.

== Divisions ==
=== Director's Office ===
Iain Wallace is interim Director of the Marine Directorate. The Director's Office provides corporate services such as business management, communications, information quality, data management, statistics, socio-economic and geographic analysis.

=== Compliance ===
The Compliance division monitors and enforces marine and sea fishing laws in Scottish waters. It reports as appropriate to the Scottish prosecuting authorities and provides intelligence on fishing activity in the seas around Scotland.

=== Science ===
The Marine Directorate's Science division undertakes research and provides scientific and technical advice to the Scottish Government (and the UK and European Union authorities) on a number of marine and fisheries issues including aquaculture and fish health, freshwater fisheries, sea fisheries and the marine ecosystem in Scotland's seas.

=== Marine Planning & Policy (MPP) ===
The Marine Directorate's Planning & Policy division covers three main policy areas and the Licensing Operations Team (LOT).

==== Marine Spatial Planning ====
The Marine Directorate is involved in marine spatial planning at both at a national and regional level. Scotland's Marine Atlas was published in 2011 as a baseline assessment, with Scotland's first National Marine Plan published in 2015. The information from the Atlas and National Marine Plan is available through maps.marine.gov.scot(NMPi) and marine.gov.scot portals. These portals form part of the Marine Scotland Open Data Network which contributes towards Marine Scotland's INSPIRE and open data obligations

==== Offshore Marine Renewables ====
The Scottish Government is developing plans for offshore wind, wave and tidal energy in Scottish waters. The Marine Directorate will explore how offshore wind, wave and tidal energy can contribute to meeting Scotland's target of generating the equivalent of 100% of electricity demand from renewable sources and also seek to maximise the contribution of these technologies to achieving a low-carbon economy.

==== Marine Conservation ====
The Marine Directorate follows a strategy for Marine Nature Conservation in Scotland's Seas based on the three pillars of species conservation, site protection, and wider seas policies and measures. Work continues on a Marine Protected Area network with 30 nature conservation MPAs designated in 2014.

==== Licensing Operations Team (LOT) ====
The Marine Directorate Licensing Operations team is a central point-of-contact for activities such as depositing or removing objects or substances from the seabed; construction or alteration works, dredging; depositing or using explosives.

=== Aquaculture and Recreational Fisheries (ARF) ===
The ARF division handles policy areas covering Aquaculture, Salmon & Recreational Fisheries, Fishery Grants, Post-EU Referendum (Brexit) and the Crown Estate in Scotland.

=== Sea Fisheries ===
The Sea Fisheries division handles policy areas covering Access to Sea Fisheries, EU Quota Negotiations and Discards, Inshore Fisheries and Coastal Communities, and International Fisheries and Environmental Interactions.

== Ensign ==
Ensign of the former Scottish Fisheries Protection Agency

The Marine Directorate formerly used the ensign of the Scottish Fisheries Protection Agency (SPFA) for its fishery protection vessels. In October 2025 a new ensign and heraldic badge was introduced for use on the Directorate's Marine Protection and Marine Research vessels. The design is similar to that used by the former SPFA, consisting of a defacted Blue Ensign. The badge in the fly of the ensign consists of an anchor and the letters M and D, surrounded by a wreath of thistles, all beneath the Crown of Scotland.

== See also ==
- Fishing in Scotland
- Marine (Scotland) Act 2010
- Marine Management Organisation (of the UK Government)
- Border Force
- Scottish Association for Marine Science
