= Hebrides Terrace Seamount =

Guyot in the Rockall Trough in the northeast Atlantic

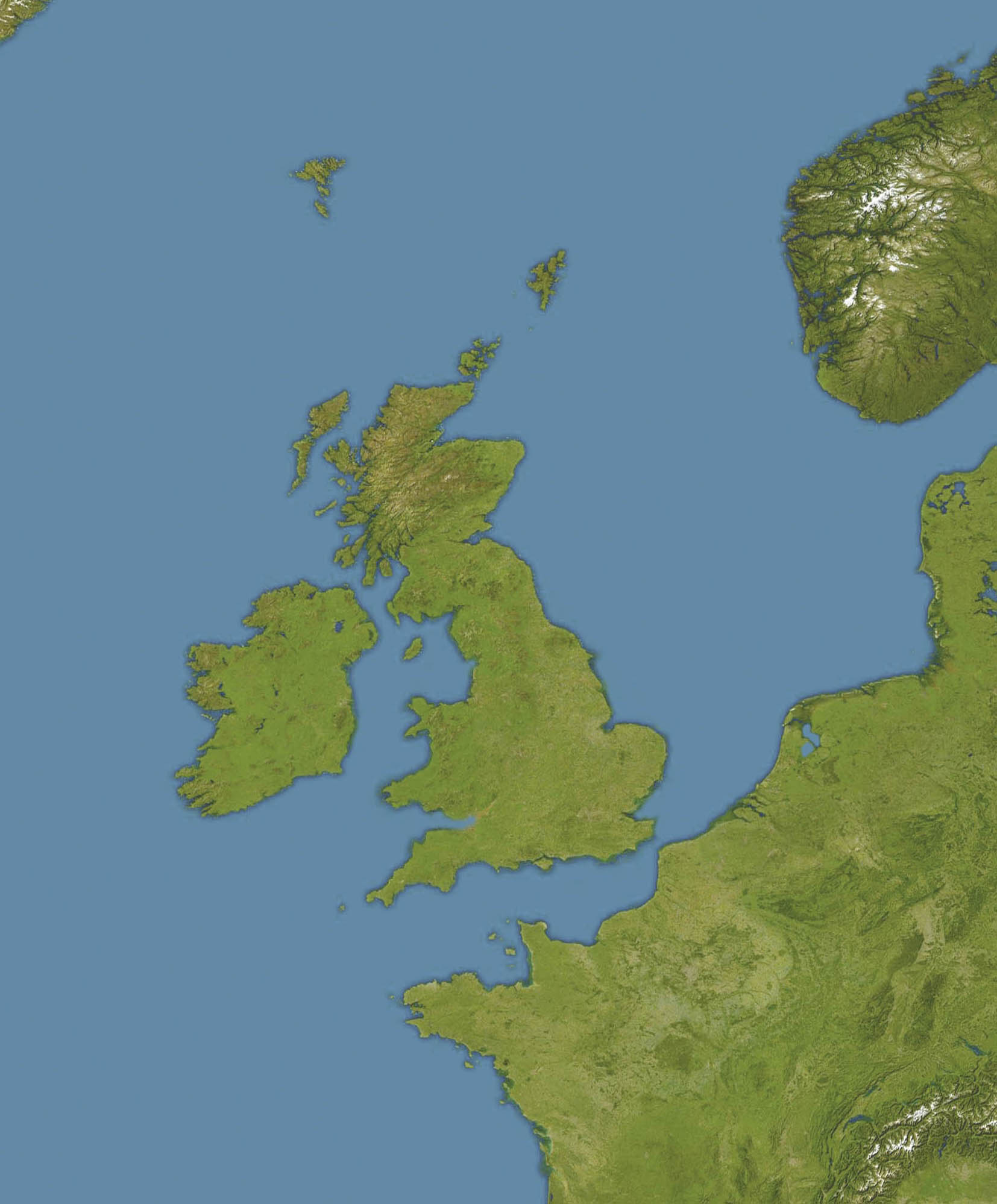
- Location within Oceans around British Isles Location within North Atlantic
- Summit depth: 1,000 m (3,300 ft)

Location
- Location: North Atlantic Ocean
- Coordinates: 56°28′N 10°17′W

Geology
- Type: Guyot

Hebrides Terrace Seamount is a seamount in the Atlantic Ocean, west-southwest from the Hebrides, Scotland. It formed through volcanism during the early Cenozoic in the Rockall Trough 60 million to 67 million years ago and afterwards sank below sea level. Presently, it is a flat-topped underwater mountain that rises to about 980 metres (3,220 ft) depth. "Coral gardens" that host a number of animals are found on its slopes.

== Geography and geomorphology ==
The seamount lies in the southern Rockall Trough, at the foot of the Scottish continental slope and 166 kilometres (103 mi) west-southwest of Barra Head, Hebrides. It is the smallest of three seamounts in the Rockall Trough; the other two are Anton Dohrn Seamount and Rosemary Bank both north of Hebrides Terrace Seamount, and farther west is the Rockall Bank. It straddles the political border between the United Kingdom and Ireland.

The Hebrides Terrace Seamount is a volcanic guyot, a seamount with a flat top and steep slopes, that rises to a depth of about 980 metres (3,220 ft). It is about 28 by 37 kilometres (17 mi × 23 mi) wide at its basis and its southern and western flanks feature canyons, escarpments and gullies. The surrounding terrain at 2,300 metres (7,500 ft) depth is covered by debris of Plio-Pleistocene age; the debris deposits are almost 1 kilometre (0.62 mi) thick. The Barra and Donegal fans, two sediment fans that form a larger complex, border the Hebrides Terrace Seamount to the north and south, respectively. The seamount has diverted sediment flows, leading to the formation of these two fans and the accumulation of sediments east of Hebrides Terrace Seamount.

Rocks dredged from Hebrides Terrace Seamount have a tholeiitic basaltic composition and define two separate suites, one aluminium-rich and the other aluminium-poor. They contain phenocrysts of augite, olivine, pigeonite, plagioclase and titanomagnetite, which together with ilmenite and pyroxene also occur in the groundmass. The seamount is the location of a positive gravity anomaly that is thought to indicate the presence of a 17 kilometres (11 mi) thick igneous body.

== Geologic history ==
The formation of the Hebrides Terrace Seamount began after the Cretaceous-Palaeogene extinction event. In the early Cenozoic, three pulses of volcanic activity generated the seamount. The volcanism may be correlative to the early Cenozoic Hebridean volcanic province. Ages of 67-60 million years have been obtained on Hebrides Terrace Seamount, as well as 62±1, 51±1 and 48±1 million years ago which coincide with activity at Anton Dohrn Seamount. These dates have been interpreted as indicating fluctuations of the Iceland hotspot.

After the end of volcanic activity, its top was flattened perhaps by Paleocene erosion that has been recognized in the region although other processes may be involved as well. This along with subsidence during the Eocene, Oligocene and in a lesser measure during the Miocene and later time lowered its summit below sea level.

Evidence of more recent seismic activity is found along its southern slopes. On 13 April 1980 a M_{L} 3.5 earthquake occurred just west of Hebrides Terrace Seamount; it was probably not an underwater explosion and may have been instead caused by movements along a local fault. Isostatic processes may have caused the earthquake. Another M_{L} 3.1 earthquake occurred south of the seamount in 1986.

== Life ==
Xenophyophores (mainly Syringammina fragilissima), sponges and corals (such as Solenosmilia variabilis) occur on Hebrides Terrace Seamount, principally on its slopes, and form so-called "coral gardens". These also host black corals, crinoids, egg cases of elasmobranchs, glass sponges and ophiuroids. The faunal communities vary depending on the depth, the substrate (bedrock, cobbles, corals, gravel and sand), the nature of the watermass surrounding them and internal tides which modulate the nutrient supply. The complicated oceanographic regime may facilitate the concentration of nutrients at the seamount, enabling the development of rich biological communities.

Beaked whales, fin whales, harbour porpoises, long-finned pilot whales have been sighted on the seamount. Fish species encountered at Hebrides Terrace Seamount include Atlantic codling, false boarfish and roundnose grenadier. Overfishing has decimated orange roughy spawning aggregations that formerly occurred at Hebrides Terrace Seamount. Sharks and other fish have also declined since the 1970s.

== Marine Protected Area ==
The Hebrides Terrace Seamount, together with a nearby seabed feature known as the Barra Fan, are together designated by the Scottish Government as a Nature Conservation Marine Protected Area named the Barra Fan and Hebrides Terrace Seamount Marine Protected Area.
