= Rockall Plateau =

Plateau in the Atlantic Ocean

Coordinates: 57.0°N 17.0°W

The Rockall Plateau is a bathymetric high west of Scotland and Ireland that forms a major part of the Rockall–Porcupine margin. Its southeastern margin is formed by the Rockall Trough and its northwestern margin by the Iceland Basin of the northern Atlantic Ocean. The plateau has been an important area for fisheries for at least 200 years, although the level of fishing effort has varied greatly over time. The earliest records show that Atlantic cod was initially an important catch, followed by haddock and more recently blue whiting, monkfish and megrim as well. Protected areas have been put in place in several locations over the plateau, following the discovery of damage caused by bottom trawling for such demersal species.

== Topography ==
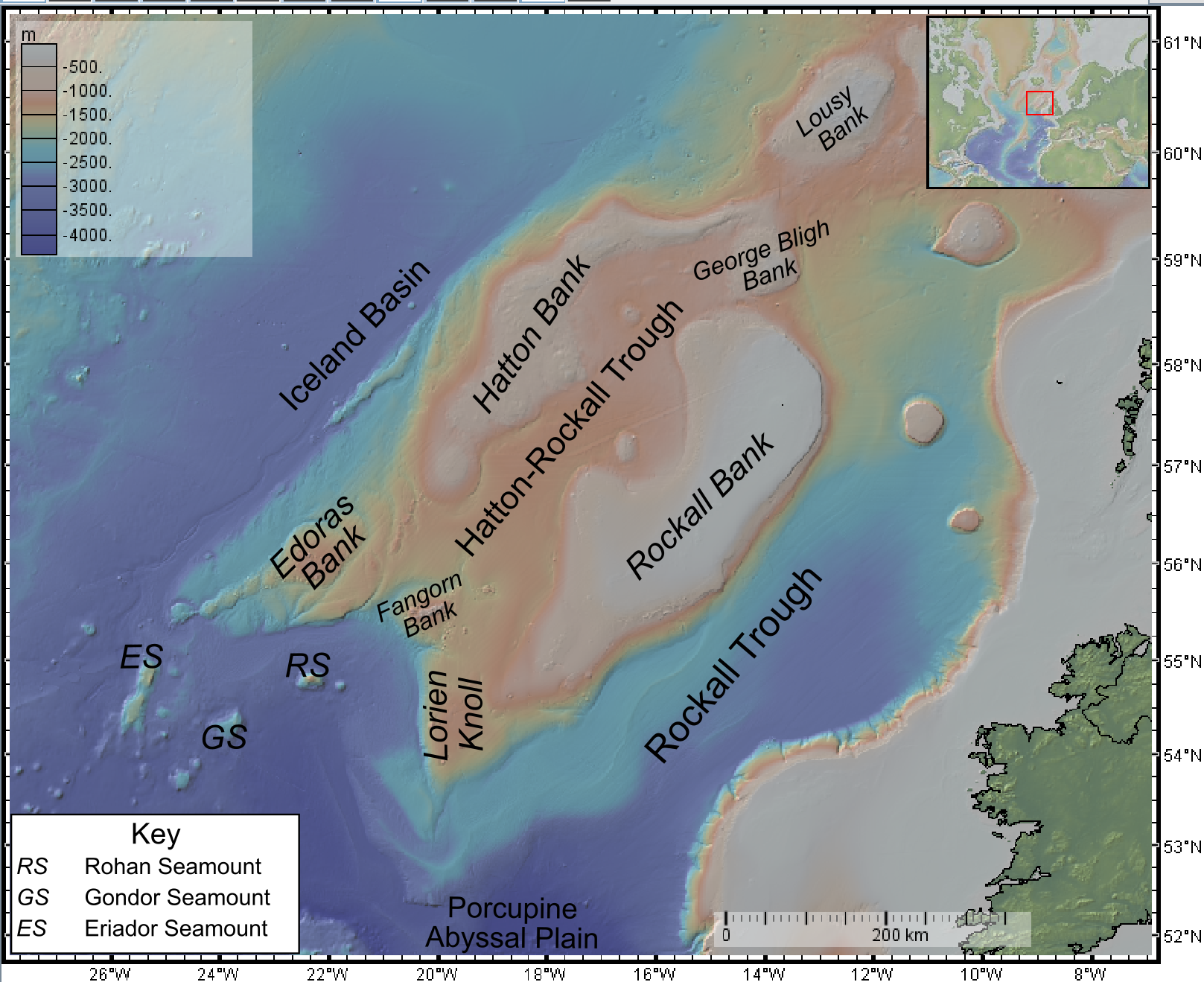
Bathymetric map of the Rockall Plateau

The southwest–northeast trending Rockall Plateau measures approximately 750 km x 450 km at a depth of about 1800 m. It consists of a number of separate highs, known as banks: the most important being the Rockall Bank and Hatton Bank, together with adjacent smaller banks, such as Edoras Bank and George Bligh Bank. Other features of the Rockall Plateau have been officially named after features of Middle-earth in the fiction of J. R. R. Tolkien, e.g. Eriador Seamount, Rohan Seamount, Gondor Seamount, Fangorn Bank, Edoras Bank, Lorien Knoll, Isengard Ridge.

== Geology ==
The plateau is a block of mostly normal thickness (~30 km) continental crust, which has in the past been described as a microcontinent, before the floor of the Rockall Basin to the southeast was confirmed as highly thinned continental crust rather than oceanic crust. The crust beneath the Hatton-Rockall Basin, roughly halfway between the plateau's northwest and southeast margins, is thinner due to rifting. The age of this rifting is uncertain, with the basin fill thought probably to be Cretaceous to Paleogene in age, although the possibility of Triassic and/or Jurassic rifting cannot be ruled out. The boundary with the Rockall Basin is known to be mostly faulted, with the development of large tilted fault blocks, such as in the Connall Basin. The details of the southwestern margin are mostly concealed by a thick Paleocene volcanic layer, although large normal faults throwing down from the Edoras and Fangorn banks with west-east and north-south trends respectively, have been interpreted, as have sub-volcanic layers of probable early Paleocene and Cretaceous age. The northwestern margin of the plateau is interpreted to be a volcanic passive margin, with well-developed Seaward Dipping Reflectors. To the northeast, the high separating the Iceland and Rockall basins narrows markedly north of George Bligh Bank, continuing with Lousy Bank and Bill Bailey's Bank, which are not normally regarded as part of the plateau. A series of volcanic centres and seamounts have been interpreted across the plateau, based on their morphology, gravity signature and from limited seabed sampling and scientific drilling. The details of the deeper geology of large parts of the plateau are obscured by the presence of lavas associated with these igneous centres. The lavas are covered by a thin discontinuous layer of Eocene to recent sediments.

== Ecology ==
The plateau, with its irregular topography, provides a wide range of habitats for marine creatures. The Rockall Bank is the shallowest part of the plateau rising to 120 m below sea level. The deeper southern and western parts of the bank are scoured by iceberg ploughmarks over a depth range of 250–400 m. These features are part-filled by postglacial sediments providing distributed areas of hard substratum enabling the growth of colonies of the cold-water scleractinian coral Lophelia pertusa, with their associated diverse fauna. The Hatton-Rockall Basin lies at greater than 1 km water depth and is dominated by a muddy substratum. Large parts of the basin floor are affected by polygonal faulting within the underlying muds, covering an area of more than 37,000 km^{2}. Parts of the basin floor have been interpreted as representing possible cold-seep habitats, based on the observation of bacterial mats, indicative of a reducing environment in the surface sediment. This is supported by the discovery of new species of chemosymbiotic bivalves sampled from one of the proposed seeps. It has been proposed that the fluids responsible for the seep have moved upwards along the polygonal fault system. Hatton Bank is the second largest on the plateau and rises to about 460 m below sea level. Although most of the bank has a coarse sandy seabed, there are areas of exposed rock and, as with the Rockall Bank, edges of iceberg ploughmarks provide additional areas of hard substratum. This habitat supports sclerectinian corals, lace corals, black corals, soft and cup corals, and gorgonians, sometimes in the form of "coral gardens". Additionally, there are various sponges (locally forming large aggregations of glass sponges), sea cucumbers, anemones and brachiopods.

== Fisheries ==
The earliest record of fishing over the Rockall Plateau dates from 1805, with reports of vessels from Shetland handlining for cod. This cod fishery grew, and 50 years later, many vessels based in Shetland and Eastern England were taking part. Handlining was progressively replaced by steam-driven longlining towards the end of the 19th-century and eventually by trawling. As the amount of cod being landed declined, an important haddock fishery developed. This peaked in the 1930s, before also declining. This reduction in haddock catches was briefly reversed in the 1970s with the arrival of a large Soviet fishing fleet. Haddock remains an important fishery on the plateau. From the 1970s, a fishery developed to exploit blue whiting, for which the plateau forms an important spawning area. Other shallow water fisheries include those for monkfish and megrim. Fisheries that target deeper water bottom fish, such as blue ling, ling, roundnose grenadier, orange roughy and deepwater sharks, are now restricted to areas beyond national jurisdictions, such as the Hatton Bank due to the evidence of unsustainable impacts both on these and other deepwater species caused by these fisheries.

== Protected areas ==
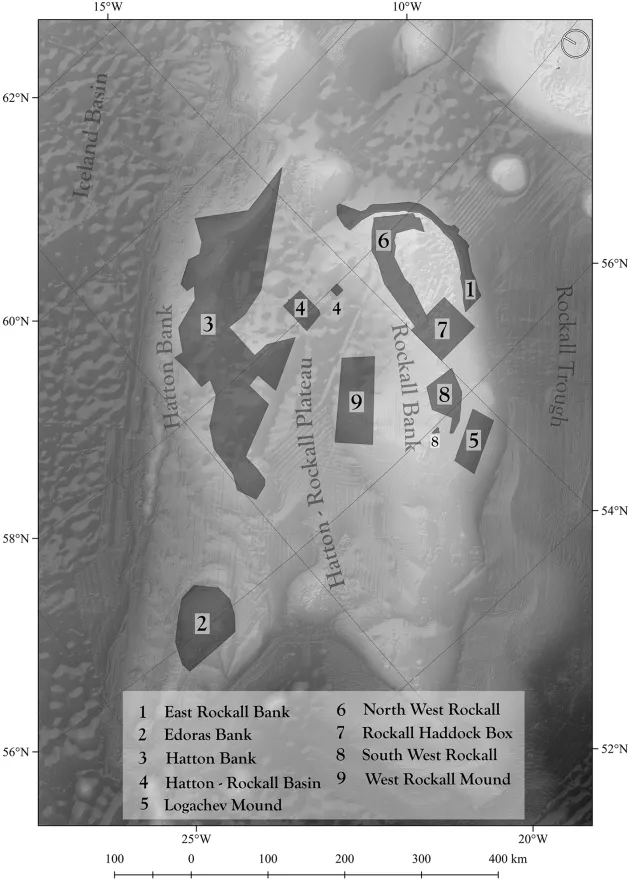
Protected areas on the Rockall Plateau from Johnson et al. (2019). It does not include the West of Scotland Marine Protected Area, which came into force in 2020

The evidence of damage to vulnerable marine ecosystems, such as deepwater corals and aggregations of sponges, as a result of fishing for demersal species across the Rockall Plateau, has led to a series of areas being subject to various degrees of protection. There are three types of protected area; Marine protected areas (MPAs), Special Areas of Conservation (SACs) and North East Atlantic Fisheries Commission (NEAFC) closures. The shallowest parts of Edoras Bank and Hatton Bank are both areas closed by the NEAFC to "Bottom trawling and fishing with static gear, including bottom set gillnets and long-lines". The Hatton Rockall Basin MPA is intended to protect deepwater sponge aggregations and aspects of the shallow geology. The Rockall Haddock Box is an area known to have high densities of both juvenile and adult haddock and is currently closed to fishing except with longlines to protect juvenile fish. George Bligh Bank lies almost entirely within the West of Scotland Marine Protected Area, which prohibits the use of demersal fishing gear within the MPA, both mobile and static.
