= Rosemary Bank =

Seamount west of Scotland in the Rockall Trough

Coordinates: 59°25′N 10°15′W

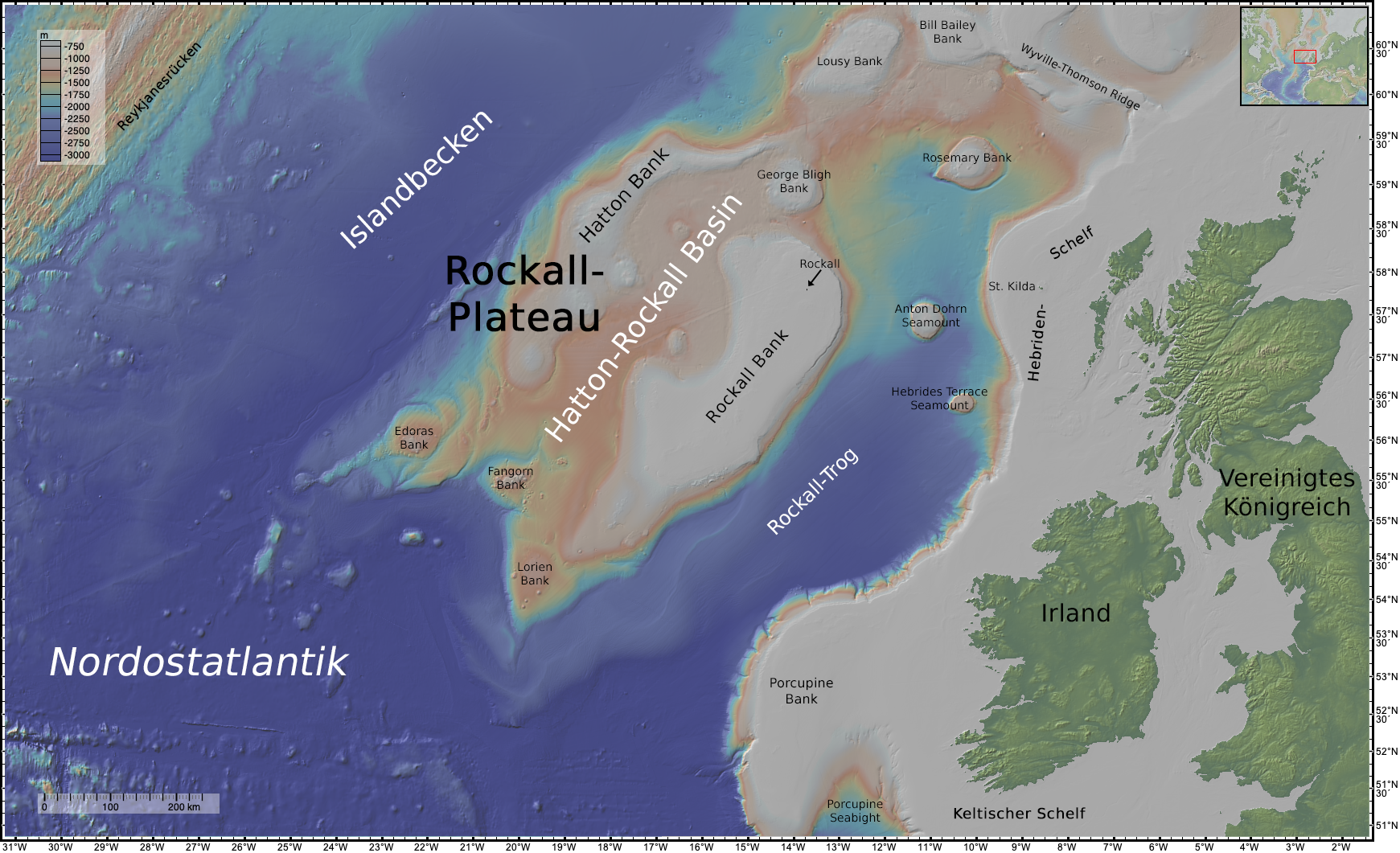
Map showing the Rockall Plateau and surrounding bathymetric features including Rosemary Bank

Rosemary Bank is a seamount approximately 120 kilometres (75 mi) west of Scotland, located in the Rockall Trough, in the northeast Atlantic. It was discovered in 1930 by the survey vessel HMS Rosemary, from which it takes its name. It is one of only three seamounts known in Scottish waters, along with the Anton Dohrn Seamount and Hebrides Terrace Seamount.

Rosemary Bank hosts a range of important habitats including deep sea sponge aggregations and cold water coral. Many species of fish, including orange roughy, blue ling, leafscale gulper shark and Portuguese dogfish are also found here.

In 2014 the bank was declared a Nature Conservation Marine Protected Area (NCMPA) in order to protect the sponge aggregs and the cenozoic marine geomorphology of the seabed. In 2020 it was replaced by the West of Scotland Marine Protected Area, which covers a much larger area.

The feature originated about 70 million years ago, as a result of volcanic activity. Rosemary Bank rises to approximately 1,000 metres (3,300 ft) above the sea floor, its highest point being 400 metres (1,300 ft) below sea-level. Around its base lies a narrow "moat", where the sea-bottom is up to 300 m (980 ft) lower than the surrounding terrain. The lowest parts of these area are approximately 2,300 metres (7,500 ft) below sea level.
