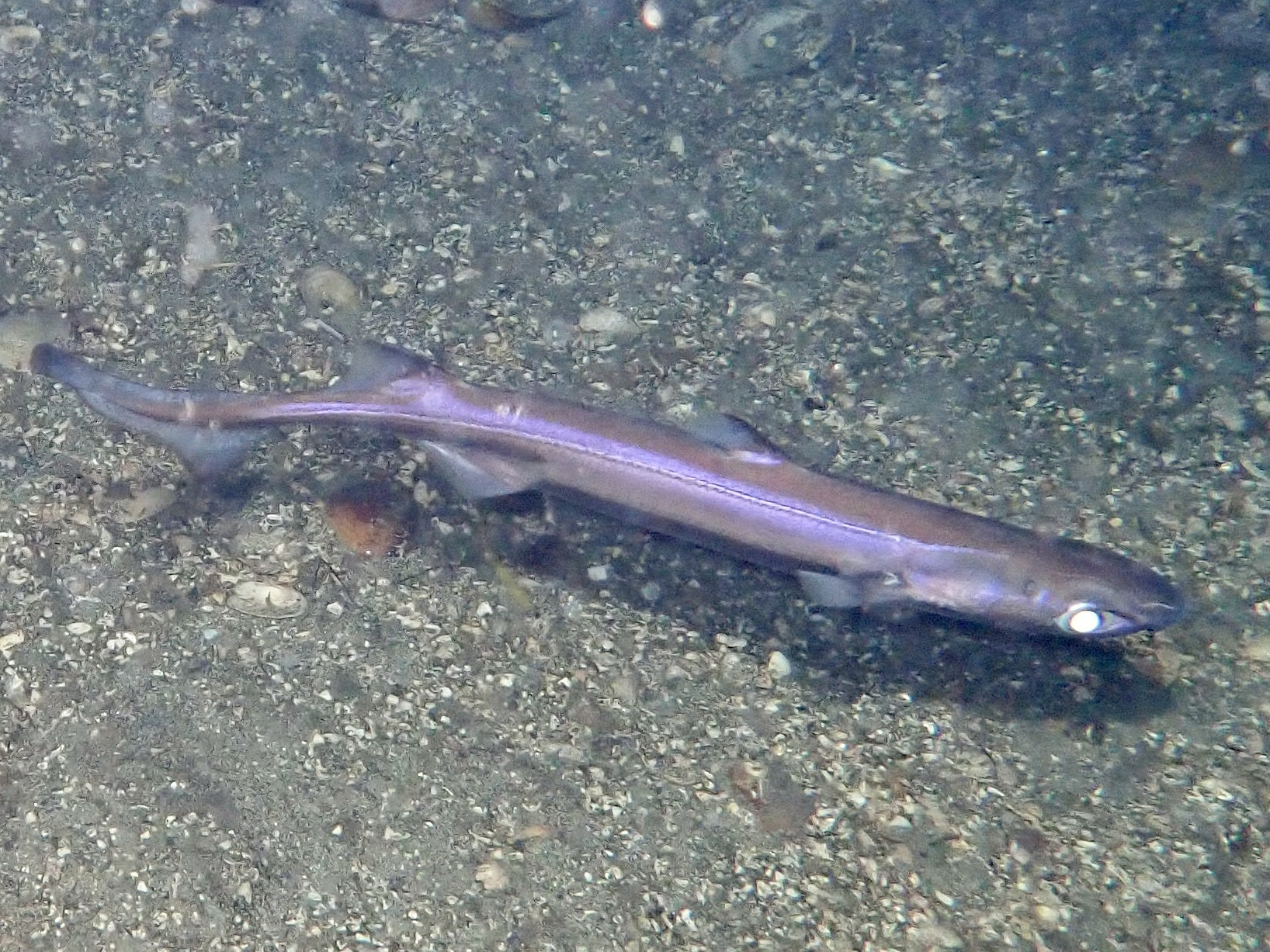

Conservation status
- Vulnerable (IUCN 3.1)

Scientific classification
- Kingdom: Animalia
- Phylum: Chordata
- Class: Chondrichthyes
- Subclass: Elasmobranchii
- Division: Selachii
- Order: Squaliformes
- Family: Etmopteridae
- Genus: Etmopterus
- Species: E. spinax

Binomial name
- Etmopterus spinax (Linnaeus, 1758)
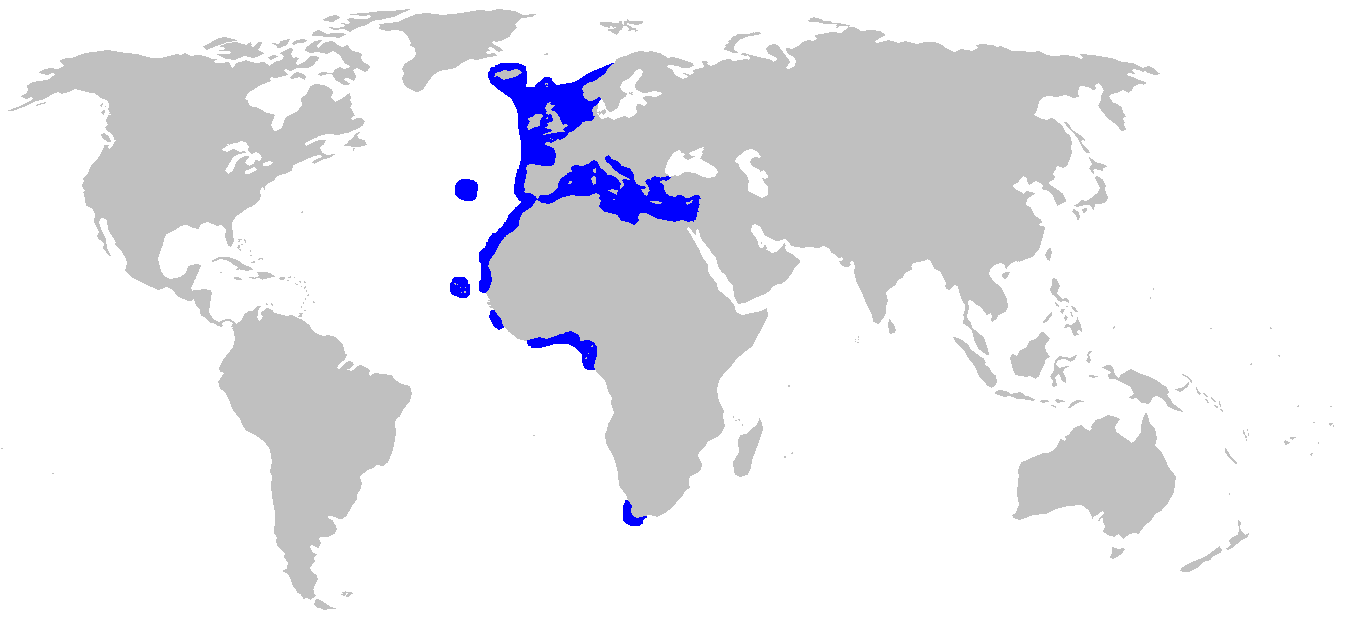
- Range of the velvet belly lantern shark

Synonyms
- Etmopterus aculeatus Rafinesque, 1810; Spinax gunneri Reinhardt, 1825; Spinax linnei Malm, 1877; Spinax niger* Cloquet, 1816; Spinax vitulinus* de la Pylaie, 1835; Squalus infernus Blainville, 1825; Squalus niger Gunnerus, 1763; Squalus spinax Linnaeus, 1758; * ambiguous synonym

= Velvet belly lanternshark =

Species of shark

The velvet belly lanternshark (or simply velvet belly) (Etmopterus spinax) is a species of dogfish shark in the family Etmopteridae. One of the most common deepwater sharks in the northeastern Atlantic Ocean, the velvet belly is found from Iceland and Norway to Gabon and South Africa at a depth of 20–2,490 m (66–8,169 ft). A small shark generally no more than 45 cm (18 in) long, the velvet belly is so named because its black underside is abruptly distinct from the brown coloration on the rest of its body. The body of this species is fairly stout, with a moderately long snout and tail, and very small gill slits. Like other lanternsharks, the velvet belly is bioluminescent, with light-emitting photophores forming a species-specific pattern over its flanks and abdomen. The ventral photophores are thought to function in counter-illumination, which camouflages the shark against predators and prey. The bioluminescent flank markings may play a role in intraspecific communication.

Young velvet bellies feed mainly on krill and small bony fish, transitioning to squid and shrimp as they grow larger. There is evidence that individuals also move into deeper water as they age. This species exhibits a number of adaptations to living in the deep sea, such as specialized T-cells and liver proteins for dealing with the higher concentrations of heavy metals found there. Velvet bellies often carry a heavy parasite load. It is ovoviviparous, giving birth to litters of six to 20 young every two to three years. This species has virtually no commercial value, but large numbers are caught as bycatch in deepwater commercial fisheries. It has been assessed as Near Threatened by the International Union for Conservation of Nature, the heavy fishing pressure throughout its range and its slow reproductive rate are raising conservation concerns.

== Taxonomy ==
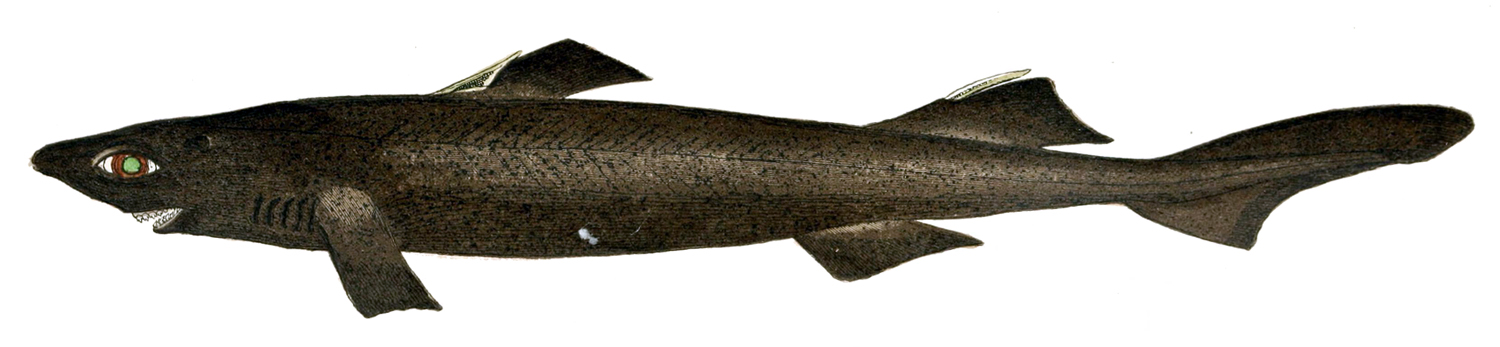
Profile view of a velvet belly lanternshark, from Les Poissons (1877).

The velvet belly was originally described as Squalus spinax by Swedish natural historian Carl Linnaeus, known as the "father of taxonomy", in the 1758 tenth edition of Systema Naturae. He did not designate a type specimen; the specific epithet spinax is in reference to the spiny dorsal fins. This species was later moved to the genus Etmopterus via the synonymy of Constantine Samuel Rafinesque's Etmopterus aculeatus with Squalus spinax.

The velvet belly is grouped with the Caribbean lanternshark (E. hillianus), fringefin lanternshark (E. schultzi), brown lanternshark (E. unicolor), broadbanded lanternshark (E. gracilispinis), combtooth lanternshark (E. decacuspidatus), and dwarf lanternshark (E. perryi) in having irregularly arranged, needle-shaped dermal denticles. Its common name comes from this shark's black ventral surface, which is sharply delineated from the rest of its body like a patch of velvet.

== Distribution and habitat ==
The range of the velvet belly is in the eastern Atlantic, extending from Iceland and Norway to Gabon, including the Mediterranean Sea, the Azores, the Canary Islands, and Cape Verde. It has also been reported off Cape Province, South Africa. This shark mainly inhabits the outer continental and insular shelves and upper slopes over mud or clay, from close to the bottom to the middle of the water column. It is most common at a depth of 200–500 m (660–1,640 ft), though in the Rockall Trough, it is only found at a depth of 500–750 m (1,640–2,460 ft). This species has been reported from as shallow as 20 m (66 ft), and as deep as 2,490 m (8,170 ft).

== Description ==
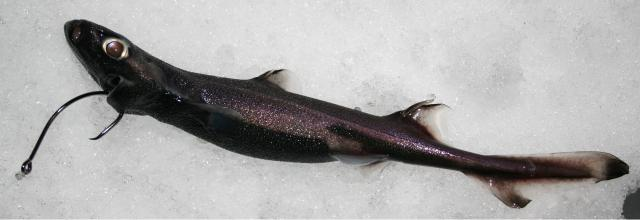
The black underside of the velvet belly lanternshark gives it its common name.

The velvet belly is a robustly built shark with a moderately long, broad, flattened snout. The mouth has thin, smooth lips. The upper teeth are small, with a narrow central cusp and usually fewer than three pairs of lateral cusplets. The lower teeth are much larger, with a strongly slanted, blade-like cusp at the top and interlocking bases. The five pairs of gill slits are tiny, comparable in size to the spiracles. Both dorsal fins bear stout, grooved spines at the front, with the second much longer than the first and curved. The first dorsal fin originates behind the short and rounded pectoral fins; the second dorsal fin is twice the size of the first and originates behind the pelvic fins. The anal fin is absent. The tail is slender, leading to a long caudal fin with a small lower lobe and a low upper lobe with a prominent ventral notch near the tip.

The dermal denticles are thin with hooked tips, arranged without a regular pattern well-separated from one another. The coloration is brown above, abruptly transitioning to black below. There are thin black marks above and behind the pelvic fins, and along the caudal fin. The velvet belly possesses numerous photophores that emit a blue-green light visible from 3–4 m (9.8–13.1 ft) away. Varying densities of photophores are arranged in nine patches on the shark's sides and belly, creating a pattern unique to this species: photophores are present along the lateral line, scattered beneath the head but excluding the mouth, evenly on the belly, and concentrated around the pectoral fins and beneath the caudal peduncle. The maximum reported length is 60 cm (24 in), although few are longer than 45 cm (18 in). Females are larger than males.

== Biology and ecology ==
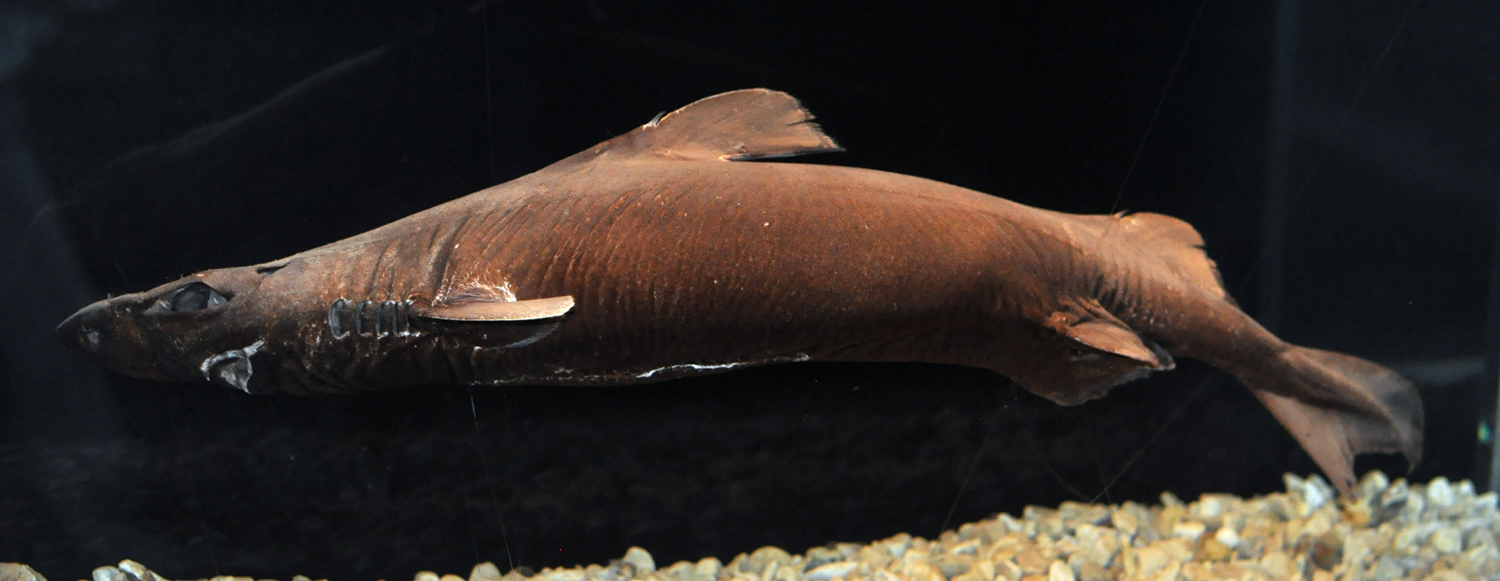
Velvet belly lanternshark preserved in formalin.

Along with the blackmouth catshark (Galeus melastomus) and the Portuguese dogfish (Centroscymnus coelolepis), the velvet belly is one of the most abundant deep-sea sharks in the northeastern Atlantic. It is found individually or in small shoals. Samplings in the Mediterranean have found females outnumbering males across all ages; this imbalance increases in the older age classes. In the Rockall Trough and the Catalan Sea, large adults are found in deeper waters than juveniles, which may serve to reduce competition between the two groups. However, this pattern has not been observed at other sites in the eastern Mediterranean.

The velvet belly's liver accounts for 17% of its body mass, three-quarters of which is oil, making it nearly neutrally buoyant. To deal with the higher concentrations of heavy metals in the deep sea, the velvet belly has T-cells in its bloodstream that can identify and mark toxic compounds for elimination. These T-cells are produced by a lymphomyeloid gland in its esophagus called a "Leydig's organ", which is also found in some other sharks and rays. In its liver, specialized proteins are also capable of detoxifying cadmium, copper, mercury, zinc, and other toxic contaminants. The velvet belly's bioluminescence is thought to function in counter-illumination, which eliminates the shark's silhouette and camouflages it from upward-looking predators. Its bioluminescence may also serve a social function, such as finding mates or co-ordinating groups, as the pattern is species-specific. The velvet belly is an important food of larger fishes such as other sharks; a major predator of this species is the longnosed skate (Dipturus oxyrinchus).

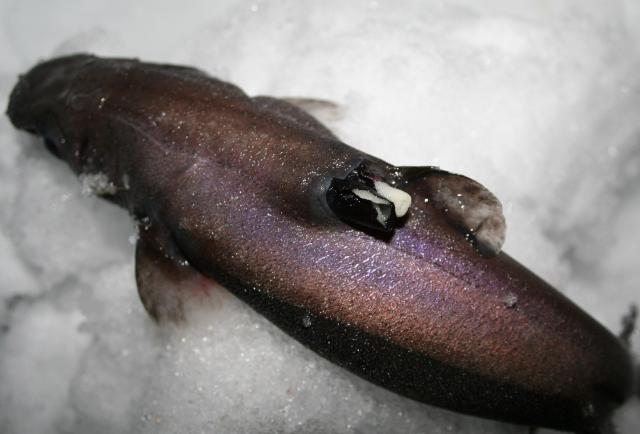
Velvet bellies are often heavily parasitized; this shark has an Anelasma squalicola barnacle attached near the fin spine.

Numerous parasites are known for this species, and both juveniles and adults often carry heavy parasite loads. Known internal parasites include the monogenean Squalonchocotyle spinacis, the tapeworms Aporhynchus norvegicus, Lacistorhynchus tenuis, and Phyllobothrium squali, and the nematodes Anisakis simplex and Hysterothylacium aduncum. Some of these parasites use the velvet belly's prey as intermediate hosts and are acquired via ingestion, while others use the shark itself as an intermediate host. The barnacle Anelasma squalicola, an external parasite, attaches to the shark's dorsal spine socket and penetrates deeply into the muscle, in the process often providing an attachment site for a second (and rarely a third) barnacle. Infestation by this barnacle reduces its host's fecundity by impairing the development of the reproductive organs.

=== Feeding ===
As generalist predators, velvet bellies feed on crustaceans (e.g. pasiphaeid shrimp and krill), cephalopods (e.g. ommastrephid squid and sepiolids), and bony fishes (e.g. shads, barracudinas, lanternfishes, and pouts). Sharks off Italy also eat small amounts of nematodes, polychaete worms, and other cartilaginous fishes. Studies of velvet bellies off Norway and Portugal, and in the Rockall Trough, have found small sharks under 27 cm (11 in) long feed mainly on the krill Meganyctiphanes norvegica and the small fish Maurolicus muelleri. As the sharks grow larger, their diets become more varied, consisting mainly of squid and the shrimp Pasiphaea tarda, as well fishes other than M. muelleri. It has been speculated that smaller velvet bellies may be too slow to catch fast-moving cephalopods. The cephalopod diet of adults overlaps with that of the Portuguese dogfish; the latter species may avoid competition with the velvet belly by living in deeper water. The bite force exerted by the velvet belly is only around 1 N.

=== Life history ===
The velvet belly is ovoviviparous, with the embryos hatching inside the uterus and being sustained by a yolk sac. The reproductive cycle may be two to three years long, with ovulation occurring in early autumn, fertilization in the summer (or possibly in the winter if females are capable of storing sperm), and parturition in late winter or early spring. The gestation period is under one year. The litter size is six to 20, with the number of young increasing with female size. At birth, the young measure 12–14 cm (4.7–5.5 in) long. The shark's bioluminescence develops before birth; the yolk sac is fluorescent before any photophores have formed, suggesting the mother transfers luminescent materials to her offspring. The first luminous tissue appears when the embryo is 55 mm (2.2 in) long, and the complete pattern is laid down by the time it is 95 mm (3.7 in) long. At birth, the young shark is already capable of counter-illumination with 80% of its ventral surface luminescent.

The growth rate of the velvet belly is slow, though faster than some other deep-sea sharks, such as the leafscale gulper shark (Centrophorus squamosus) or the shortspine spurdog (Squalus mitsukurii). Males mature sexually at 28–33 cm (11–13 in) long and females at 34–36 cm (13–14 in) long. The average age at maturity is 4.0 years for males and 4.7 years for females, though four-year-old mature individuals of both sexes have been caught in the wild, along with immature females over eight years old. Males and females eight and 11 years old, respectively, have been caught in the wild; the potential lifespan of this species has been estimated at 18 years for males and 22 years for females.

== Human interactions ==
Throughout their range, substantial quantities of velvet bellies are caught as bycatch in bottom trawls meant for shrimp and lobsters, and deepwater longlines meant for other fish. Lacking commercial value, these sharks are almost always discarded with extremely high mortality, though occasionally they are dried and salted or made into fishmeal. The IUCN has listed the velvet belly under Least Concern overall, as its population remains stable across much of its range, and it is afforded some protection in the Mediterranean from a 2005 ban on bottom trawling below 1,000 m (3,300 ft). It has been assessed as Near Threatened, as its numbers have declined by almost 20% from 1970 to 1998–2004. The slow reproductive rate of this species limits its capacity to recover from population depletion.
