= Melanella gagei =

Scientific classification
- Kingdom: Animalia
- Phylum: Mollusca
- Class: Gastropoda
- Subclass: Caenogastropoda
- Order: Littorinimorpha
- Family: Eulimidae
- Genus: Melanella
- Species: M. gagei

Binomial name
- Melanella gagei Bouchet & Warén, 1986

Species of gastropod

Melanella gagei is a species of small sea snail, a marine gastropod mollusk in the family Eulimidae.

== Description ==
The length of the shell attains 3.17 mm, its diameter 0.19 mm.

== Distribution ==
This abyssal marine species occurs on the Rockall Trough in the Bay of Biscay.
