= Rockall Basin =

Geological feature northwest of Scotland and Ireland

Coordinates: 56°00′N 12°00′W

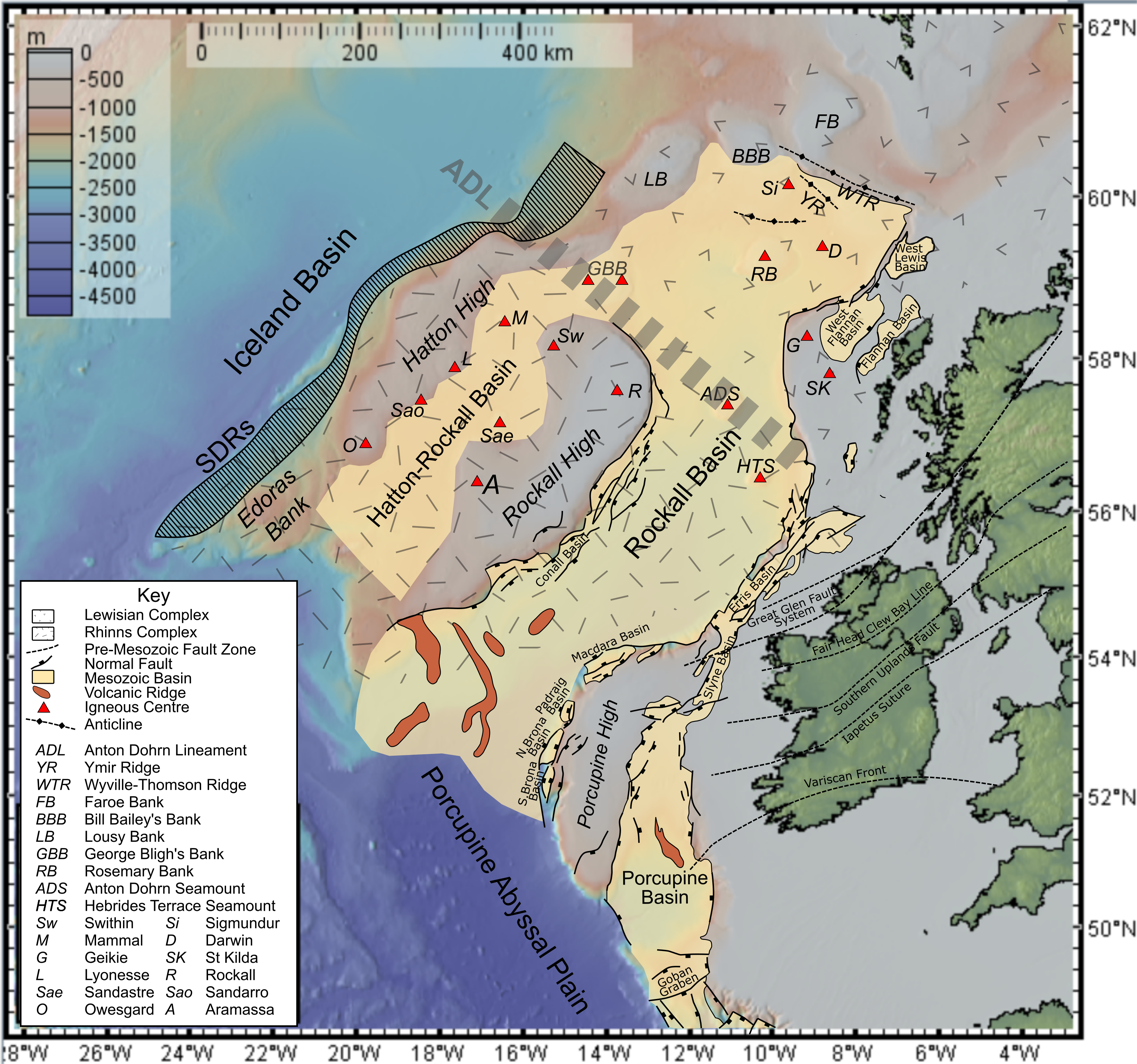
Geology of the Rockall–Porcupine margin

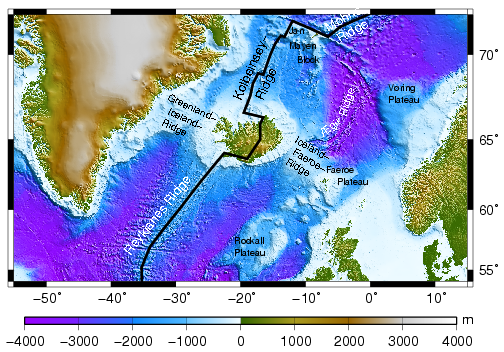
North Atlantic around Iceland

The Rockall Basin is a large (approximately 800 by 150 kilometres (500 by 90 mi)) sedimentary basin that lies beneath the deepwater bathymetric feature, the Rockall Trough. Both are named after Rockall, a rocky islet lying 301.4 km (187.3 mi) west of St Kilda. The basin is flanked to the northwest by the Rockall High (part of the larger Rockall Plateau), to the southeast by the Porcupine High, to the north by the Wyville-Thomson Ridge and to the southwest by the Porcupine Abyssal Plain.

== Geological structure ==
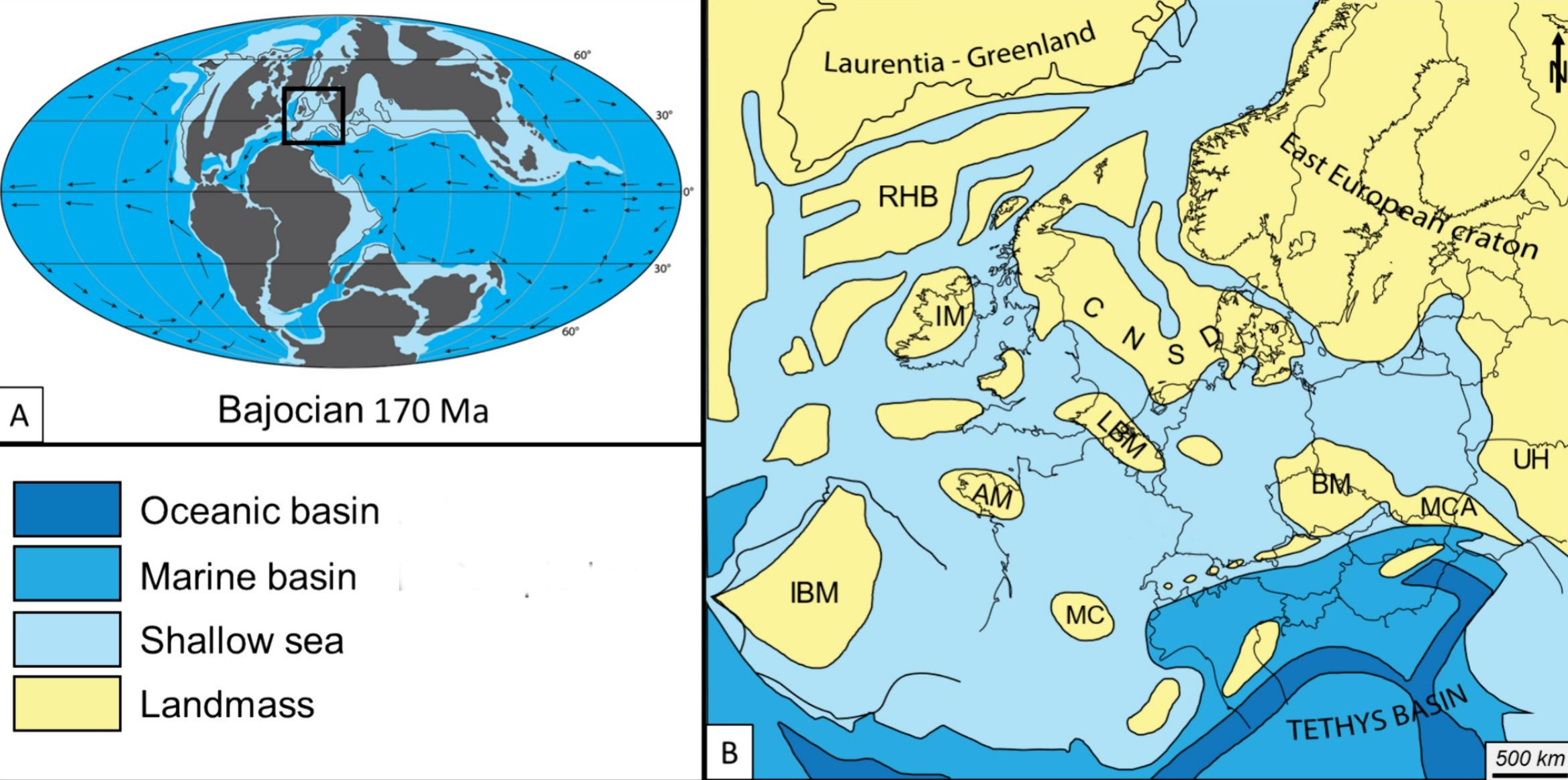
Paleogeographic map of Europe during the Bajocian age of the Middle Jurassic, showing the position of the Rockall Bank (RHB), and the Rockall Basin to the immediate southeast

The nature of the crust beneath the Rockall Trough has long been a matter of debate. Originally thought to be oceanic crust, it is now generally considered to be highly stretched continental crust. However, some groups of researchers continue to favour either oceanic or transitional style crust, particularly at the southern end of the basin.

The Rockall Basin forms part of a chain of highly extended Mesozoic rift basins between the Charlie–Gibbs and Senja fracture zones. It includes: the Faroe-Shetland Basin, the Møre Basin, and the Vøring Basin. There are indications that the Rockall Basin developed within an earlier rift system, which is likely to be of Triassic to Middle Jurassic in age, by analogy with the nearby Slyne-Erris Basins. The age of the main rift phase in the Rockall Basin is strongly debated, with Late Jurassic, Early-, Mid- and Late Cretaceous all being suggested.

During the Jurassic period, the Rockall Basin formed a seaway between the emergent Rockall-Hatton landmass (equivalent to the modern submerged Rockall Bank) and the emergent Hebrides Platform (comprising the modern Outer Hebrides).

One of the features of the Rockall Basin is the Anton Dohrn Seamount. It lies 600 metres (2,000 ft) beneath the surface, rising 1,500 metres (4,900 ft) from the surrounding seabed. The Rockall Plateau finished forming approximately 55 million years ago, a continental block that lies between Greenland and Europe when the ancient continent of Laurasia was split apart by prolonged rifting. The Rockall islet is the highest point of the plateau, rising 17.15 m (56 ft 3 in) above sea level. It is made of a type of peralkaline granite.

=== Economic geology ===
To date, there has been comparatively little drilling to explore for oil and gas within the Rockall Basin and only two discoveries have been made: Benbecula in the northern UK Rockall (Shell originally Enterprise Oil) and Dooish in the northern Irish Rockall (Shell originally Enterprise Energy Ireland). The discoveries show that, at least locally, there is a working petroleum system. Rights to exploit these resources are disputed between the United Kingdom, Ireland, Iceland and the Faroe Islands (a possession of Denmark). This topic is addressed in Rockall Bank dispute.

== See also ==
- Hatton Basin
