= Melanella myriotrochi =

- Shell of Melanella myriotrochi

Scientific classification
- Kingdom: Animalia
- Phylum: Mollusca
- Class: Gastropoda
- Subclass: Caenogastropoda
- Order: Littorinimorpha
- Family: Eulimidae
- Genus: Melanella
- Species: M. myriotrochi

Binomial name
- Melanella myriotrochi Bouchet & Warén, 1986

Species of gastropod

Melanella myriotrochi is a species of sea snail, a marine gastropod mollusk in the family Eulimidae.

== Description ==
The length of the shell attains 2.84 mm, its diameter 1.19 mm.

== Distribution ==
This abyssal marine species occurs in the Atlantic Ocean in the Rockall Trough.
