= West of Scotland Marine Protected Area =

Area of the North North Atlantic

West of Scotland MPA
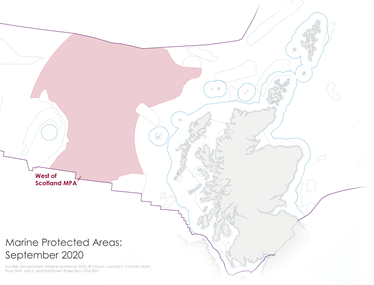
- The location and extent of the West of Scotland MPA
- Location: North Atlantic, Scotland
- Coordinates: 58°37′43″N 11°00′08″W
- Area: 107,773 km^{2} (41,611 sq mi)
- Designation: Scottish Government
- Established: 2020
- Operator: Marine Scotland
- Website: West of Scotland MPA

The West of Scotland Marine Protected Area covers a large area of the North Atlantic to the west of the Outer Hebrides. The Marine Protected Area (MPA) was designated by the Scottish Government in 2020, replacing the Rosemary Bank MPA, which covered a much smaller area. Covering a sea area of over 100,000 square kilometres (39,000 sq mi), it is the largest marine protected area in Europe.

The MPA covers a diverse range of marine landscapes. Moving west, these include: the steep gradient of the continental slope; the sediment plains of the Rockall Trough; and the rising slopes of George Bligh Bank and the Rockall Bank. The area also includes two isolated seamounts: Anton Dohrn and Rosemary Bank. It protects several important habitats including deep-sea sponge aggregations and cold water coral reefs and gardens. Six species of deep-sea fish are specifically protected within the MPA: blue ling, orange roughy, leafscale gulper shark, gulper shark, Portuguese dogfish and round-nose grenadier.
