= Barra Fan and Hebrides Terrace Seamount Marine Protected Area =

Seabed features in the North Atlantic

The Barra Fan and Hebrides Terrace Seamount MPA
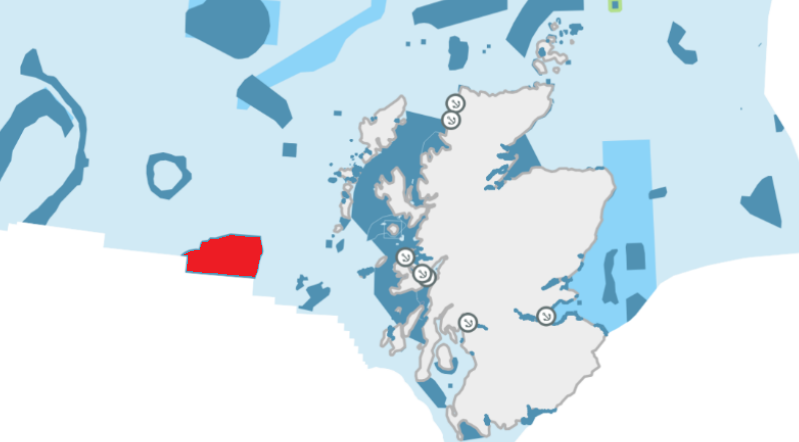
- The location and extent of The Barra Fan and Hebrides Terrace Seamount MPA, shown in red
- Location: North Atlantic, Scotland
- Coordinates: 56°36′N 9°43′W
- Area: 4,373 km^{2} (1,688 sq mi)
- Designation: Scottish Government
- Established: 2014
- Operator: Marine Scotland

The Barra Fan and Hebrides Terrace Seamount is the name given to a Nature Conservation Marine Protected Area that lies in Scottish waters to the west of the Outer Hebrides, adjacent to the boundary with Ireland. It covers two distinct geological features of the North Atlantic Ocean: the Barra Fan and the Hebrides Terrace Seamount.

== Barra Fan ==
The Barra Fan is a geological protected feature of the North Atlantic Ocean to the west of the Scottish island of Barra. It was formed by a series of submarine landslides that affected an area of subsea sediments. The fan lies to the east of the Hebrides Terrace Seamount, in a region known as the Hebridean Slope, where the seabed drops from the continental shelf, at a depth of c. 150 m below sea level, down to Rockall Trough (c. 2300 m below sea level). The topography of the seabed in the Barra Fan was modified by the action of icebergs grounding on the seabed during the ice ages, and has also been affected by the action of oceanic currents.

== Hebrides Terrace Seamount ==
The seamount of the Hebrides Terrace is thought to represent the remnant of an ancient volcano that rises to a height of almost 1 km above the surrounding seabed. It lies to the west of the Barra Fan, and supports a diverse range of marine life, including cold-water corals and deep sea sponges. The effect the seamount has on underwater currents is thought to ensure a good supply of food for many species of fish in the area, and the seamount is particularly associated with the orange roughy, a large long-living deep-sea fish. Several species of whale and shark also visit the area.

The seamount is the location of a positive gravity anomaly that is thought to indicate the presence of an igneous body of rock some 17 km thick.
