= Anton Dohrn Seamount =

Guyot in the Rockall Trough in the northeast Atlantic

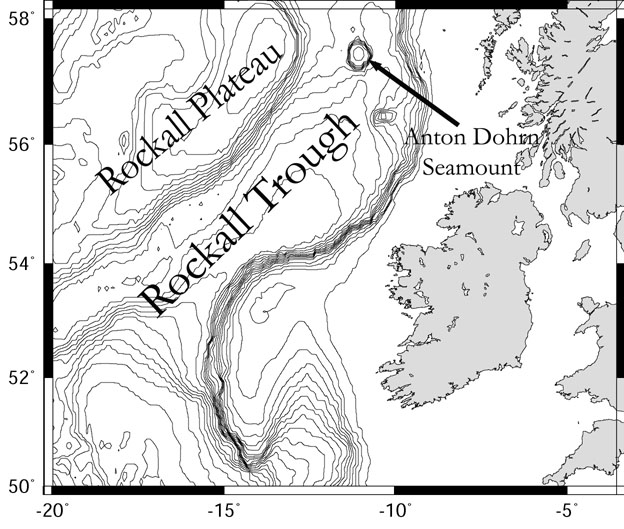

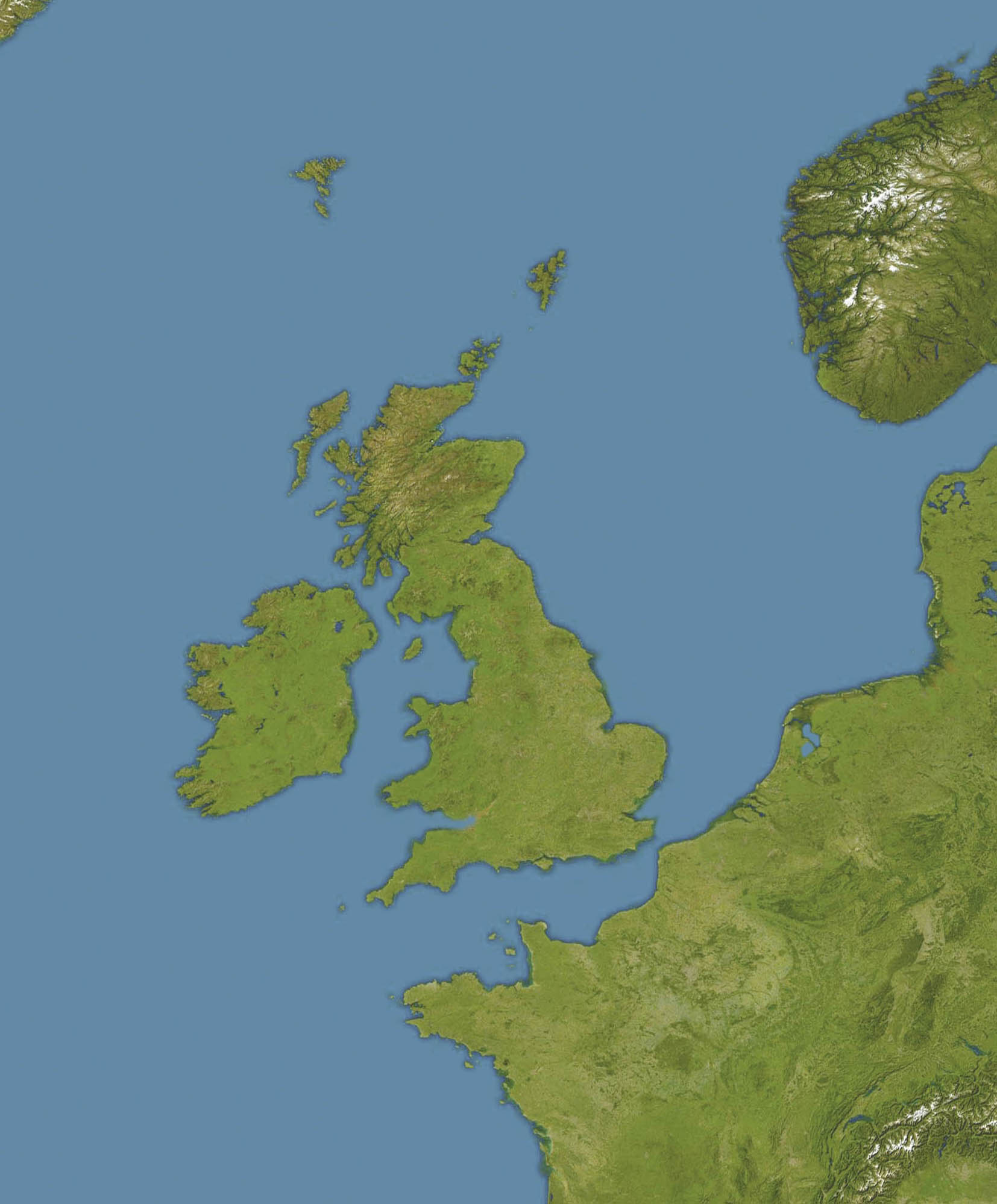
- Location within Oceans around British Isles Location within North Atlantic
- Summit depth: 600 m (2,000 ft)
- Height: 1,500 m (4,900 ft)

Location
- Location: North Atlantic Ocean
- Coordinates: 57°30′N 11°00′W
- Country: United Kingdom (EEZ)

Geology
- Type: Guyot
- Last eruption: ~40 million years

The Anton Dohrn Seamount is a guyot in the Rockall Trough in the northeast Atlantic. It is 1.8 kilometres (1.1 mi) high and is topped with pinnacles, one of which reaches a depth of 530 metres (1,740 ft). Away from the flat top upon which the pinnacles rest, the slopes fall off steeply into the Rockall Trough and a moat in the sediment that surrounds the seamount.

It appears to be a volcano formed by basaltic lava and tuff. It formed during the Cretaceous and Paleogene and was proposed to be a source for bentonite layers across the British Isles. After the Cretaceous, subsidence and erosion lowered its top until it sank below sea level. The seamount was discovered in 1958.

Anton Dohrn Seamount hosts a diverse ecosystem characterized by reefs formed by cold water corals, sponges and xenophyophorans, which themselves host a number of animals. It has been affected by human fishing operations, however.

== Name and research history ==
Anton Dohrn Seamount is also known as Anton Dohrn Kuppe, a name used by German charts, and as Anton Dohrn bank. It was discovered on 22 September 1958 by the survey vessel Gauss during the Polarfront programme and later surveyed on 18–19 April 1959 by the fishery research vessel FFS Anton Dohrn, itself named after the naturalist Anton Dohrn, founder of the Stazione Zoologica Anton Dohrn (SZN) in Naples, Italy.

== Geography and geomorphology ==
Anton Dohrn Seamount is located in the northeast Atlantic Ocean west of Scotland, approximately halfway between St Kilda (Hebrides) and Rockall, about 155 kilometres (96 mi) west of the former. It lies in the Rockall Trough, an over 2,000 metres (6,600 ft) deep submarine depression of unclear origin. North-northeast lies the Rosemary Bank and Hebrides Terrace Seamount is found south-southeast from the seamount. The seamount is located inside the exclusive economic zone of the United Kingdom.

Anton Dohrn Seamount is a 1.8 kilometres (1.1 mi) high and about 45 kilometres (28 mi)–40 kilometres (25 mi) wide circular guyot with a flat top at 1,100–530 metres (3,610–1,740 ft) depth. Flat-topped seamounts are unusual in the North Atlantic. The shallowest point of the seamount lies at about 530 metres (1,740 ft) depth and is formed by a pinnacle that protrudes from the c. 600 metres (2,000 ft) deep summit platform. A 100 metres (330 ft) thick layer of sediment covers the flat top and appears to be reworked by storms and sea currents. Mounds, slope breaks and other volcanic pinnacles are located on the flat top. The seamount tilts southeastward.

Beyond the margin of the flat top, the slopes of Anton Dohrn Seamount drop down to 2,400 metres (7,900 ft) depth. The steep slopes have been variously described as either lacking a sediment cover or featuring gravelly sediments along with outcropping bedrock. There are cliffs, ridges and rockfalls but no gullies or canyons. Parasitic cones lie on the northwestern slope. A moat surrounds the seamount and reaches depths of about 2,300 metres (7,500 ft). It might have formed either through erosion of surrounding sediments by ocean currents or through isostatic subsidence.

== Geology ==
The crust underneath Anton Dohrn Seamount is much thinner than underneath the British Isles and the Rockall Plateau east and west of the seamount, respectively, and the Mohorovičić discontinuity is located at a shallower depth. The crust may be either stretched continental crust or oceanic crust, and is covered by sediments. At Anton Dohrn Seamount the crust appears to be unusually shallow, perhaps due to the Iceland plume's buoyancy. The Iceland plume has uplifted terrain as far as 1,000 kilometres (620 mi) from the plume. A 100 kilometres (62 mi) long crustal lineament known as the Anton Dohrn Lineament crosses through the seamount; it may extend into Scotland and Rockall Bank and runs in northwest–southeast direction.

Anton Dohrn Seamount is probably formed mostly by basaltic lava and tuffs which define a transitional to alkaline suite. The rocks contain feldspar and olivine phenocrysts as well as plagioclase. They are covered with ferromanganese crusts and vesicles contain carbonates, clay and zeolites which formed through alteration. Chalks of Maastrichtian age, Eocene nearshore conglomerates and Miocene muds and sands have also been recovered. A granite rock has been dredged as well; it may be a dropstone from icebergs and such exotic rocks have been found in other dredge samples.

== Geologic history ==
Anton Dohrn Seamount is a former volcano. Radiometric dating of volcanic rocks dredged from it has yielded ages of 70 ± 1, 62 ± 1, 47 ± 1 and 41 ± 1 million years ago, indicating episodic activity over 29 million years. Pulses of volcanic activity of similar age have been identified at other volcanoes in the region and may reflect fluctuations of the Iceland plume. The onset of volcanic activity may have been the consequence of crustal extension in the region. The activity during the Cretaceous implies that rifting in the North Atlantic was already underway at that time. At that time, the Rockall Trough was at least 1 kilometre (0.62 mi) deep.

Xenoliths found in volcanic rocks indicate that at Anton Dohrn volcanic activity involved interactions between magma and sediments, resulting in phreatomagmatic eruptions that could have dispersed volcanic ash in the region. This volcanic ash erupted by Anton Dohrn may be the source of post-Cenomanian bentonites of the British Isles but the age and composition of the bentonites do not support this theory. The seamount was once proposed to be the source of Turonian tephra deposits in Western Europe before its Maastrichtian age was established.

During the Cretaceous the seamount was about 2 kilometres (1.2 mi) higher than present, perhaps even reaching 2,000 metres (6,600 ft) height above sea level; presumably it was then eroded during the Paleocene when a wave of erosion took place in western Britain and stripped much of the volcanic centres of northwest Scotland. An episode of crustal subsidence in the Cretaceous-Oligocene also played a role in lowering Anton Dohrn Seamount. The pinnacles on the seamount may be leftover volcanic conduits that resisted erosion. Sedimentation covered the seamount and its flanks in the Eocene and continued afterwards.

== Ecology ==
Barnacles and brachiopods grow on the top of the seamount, and echinoderms, corals and cirripedes also occur there. On the sandy or gravelly substrate serpulids and sponges are found. The seamount may be a shark nursery. Finally, the bivalve Xylophaga anselli has been found at Anton Dohrn Seamount and the Hebrides slope.

A number of ecosystems have been found on Anton Dohrn Seamount, including coral gardens, cold water coral reefs and sponge and xenophyophore communities; this seamount is the first place in the United Kingdom where coral gardens have been discovered. The sandy and cobbly terrain of the slopes with occasional bedrock outcrops is populated by reefs that grow on bedrock or on cobbles. They mostly occur on the sides of the seamount, on mounds on the flat top and its margin, perhaps for hydrodynamic reasons or because substrates favourable for the development of the reefs are found there. There is a vertical stratification, with Lophelia found at shallower depths than Solenosmilia. Corals such as antipatharians like Leiopathes sp., small bamboo corals, large gorgonians and soft corals like as Anthomastus sp. have also been found at parasitic vents. The cold water coral cover can become so thick that the underground disappears underneath it.

Dropframe camera surveys have seen anemones, anthozoans, ascidians, the asteroid (starfish) Henricia sp., bamboo corals, caryophyllids, cerianthids, antipatharian corals with various shapes, the corals Desmophyllum dianthus, Lophelia pertusa and Solenosmilia variabilis, echinoderms including brisingids and crinoids, glass sponges, gorgonians, holothurians, the ophiuroids Ophiactis balli and Ophiomusium lymani, the pencil urchin Cidaris cidaris, pycnogonids, the scleractinian Madrepora oculata, the seapen Pennatula phosphorea, sea urchins, sea whips, serpulids, soft corals such as Gersemia sp. and Anthomastus sp., lobose, large and encrusting sponges, stylasterids and xenophyophores. Decapods, fish including Lepidion eques, the eel Synaphobranchus kaupi and squat lobsters Munida sp. have also been encountered.

Seamounts are considered to be biodiversity hotspots, and there are proposals to make Anton Dohrn Seamount a Special Area of Conservation. The region is considered to be "the cradle of deep-sea biology" as Victorian-era scientists sampled the regional fauna. Ocean currents around Anton Dohrn Seamount are complicated and formed by various water masses. Internal tides at the seamount appear to be important for its ecosystem.

The seamount has been impacted by deep water fishing. Lost fishing gear and trawl marks have been found on Anton Dohrn Seamount, and animals found at its foot have ingested microplastics. In October 2020 the seamount was made part of the West of Scotland Marine Protected Area by the Scottish Government in attempt to protect the area's ecology.
