= Wyville Thomson Ridge =

Feature of the North Atlantic Ocean floor between the Faroe Islands and Scotland

Coordinates: 60.13°N 7.60°W

Highest point
- Elevation: −400 m (−1,300 ft)

Dimensions
- Length: 100 km (62 mi)
- Width: 30 km (19 mi)

Geography
- Location: North Atlantic Ocean

Geology
- Mountain type: Submarine ridge

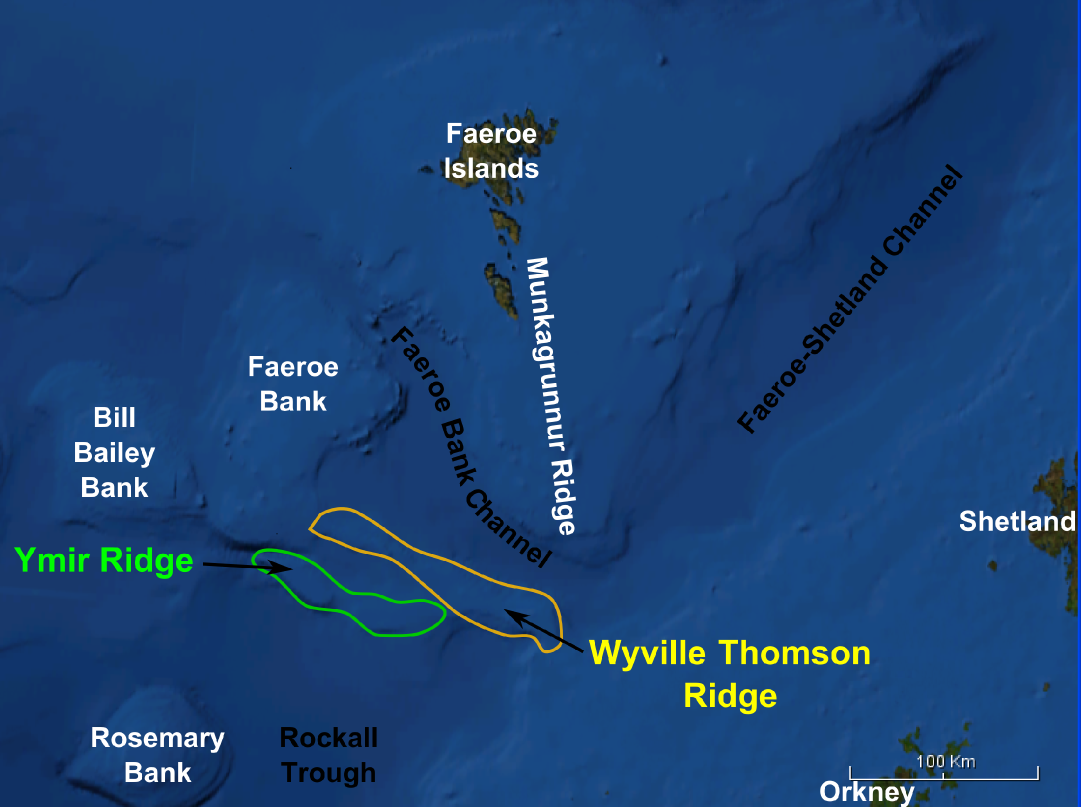
Map of bathymetric features of the Atlantic NW of Scotland

The Wyville Thomson Ridge is a bathymetric feature of the North Atlantic Ocean floor ca. 200 km in length, located between the Faroe Islands and Scotland. The ridge separates the Faroe–Shetland Channel to the north from the Rockall Trough to the south. Its significance lies in the fact that it forms part of the barrier between the colder bottom waters of the Arctic and the warmer waters of the North Atlantic.

The Wyville Thomson Ridge is named after Charles Wyville Thomson who pioneered the first exploration of the area.

== Geology ==
The Wyville Thomson Ridge, and the smaller but similar Ymir Ridge, form the northern boundary to the Rockall Basin, a mainly Mesozoic rift structure. The current form of the ridge is an anticline with up to 2 km of amplitude, formed by a period of shortening during the Eocene to Miocene period. This fold is interpreted to have formed by the reactivation of a pre-existing fault, and is, therefore, classified as an inversion structure.
