= Hatton Basin =

Sedimentary basin off the west coast of Ireland

Coordinates: 57°N 19°W

The Hatton Basin or Hatton-Rockall Basin is a ca. 600 km long SW–NE trending sedimentary basin, located off the west coast of Ireland, within the Rockall–Porcupine margin. It lies between the Hatton and Edoras Banks to the west and the Rockall Bank to the east. The basin contains about 4,000 m of sediments of probable Cretaceous to Cenozoic age. Its relationship to the Rockall Basin remains uncertain.

== Fill ==
Only the uppermost part of the fill of the Hatton Basin is known with certainty, based on DSDP boreholes (sites 116 & 117) and ODP borehole 982. The interpretation of the deeper parts relies on correlation with older sequences known from the Hatton Bank.

The basement is thought to consist of metamorphic rocks of Paleoproterozoic age, based on sampling from the Rockall High. The oldest sedimentary rocks proven in the area are Albian (uppermost Lower Cretaceous) mudstones and sandstones, encountered in two British Geological Survey boreholes drilled on the Hatton Bank. By comparison with neighbouring basins both Paleozoic and Mesozoic sequences are expected to be present in the Hatton Basin.

The proven Cenozoic sequence starts with Paleocene lavas, part of the North Atlantic Igneous Province, overlain by Eocene claystones. There is then a major hiatus, with the next youngest preserved strata above the unconformity (known regionally as C30) being of Upper Eocene to Lower Oligocene age. The remainder of the sequence consists of Miocene to Pleistocene calcareous oozes.

== Development ==
The basin is understood to be a result of rifting within the Hatton–Rockall plateau. The age of the rifting is poorly constrained, but is thought to be of Cretaceous age. From wide-angle seismic profiles over the basin and the adjacent highs, a stretching factor of about 2 has been estimated.

== Ecology ==
Hatton-Rockall Basin MPA
- IUCN category IV (habitat/species management area)
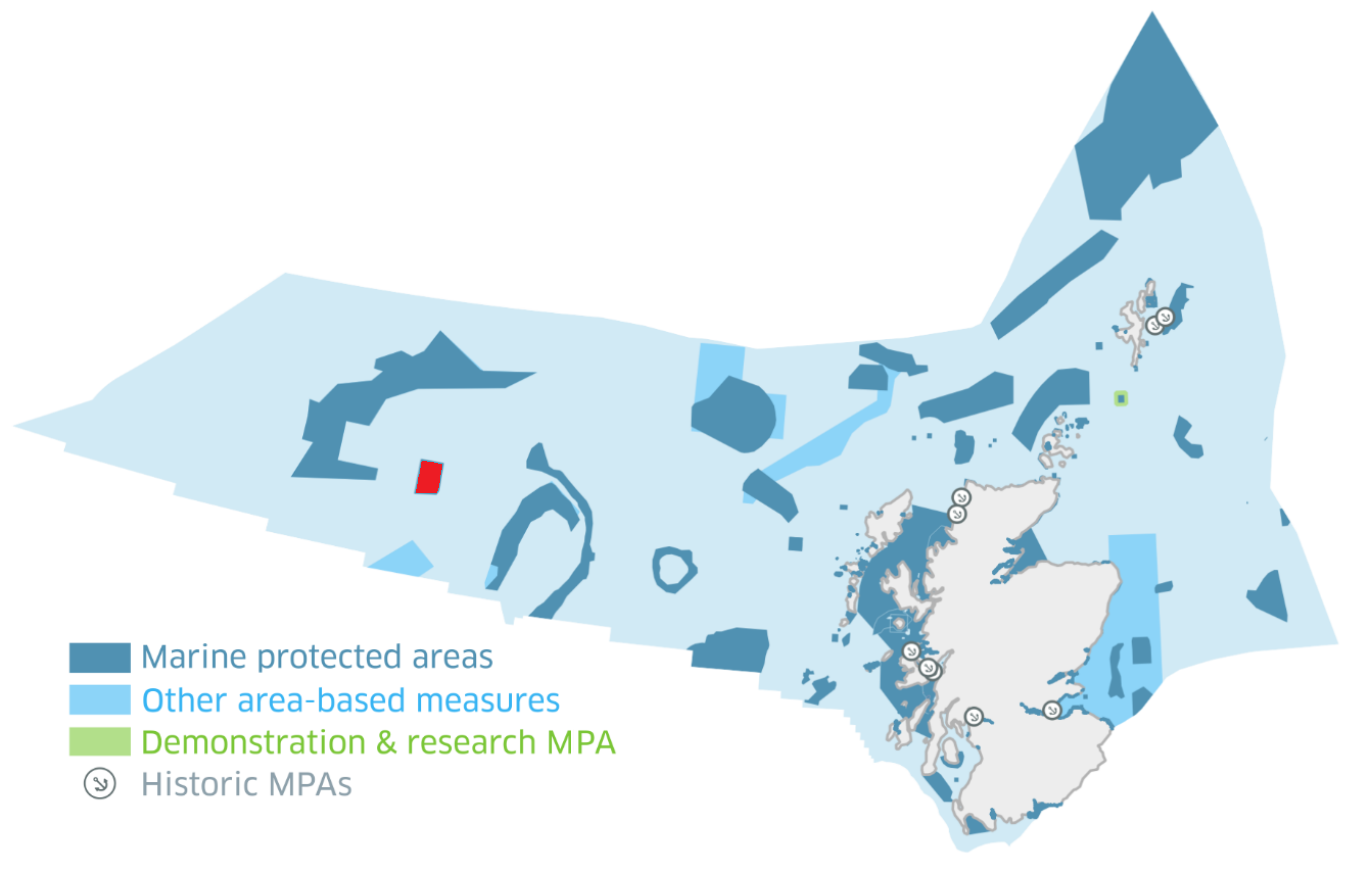
- The location and extent of the Hatton-Rockall Basin MPA, shown in red
- Location: North Atlantic, Scotland
- Area: 1,256 km^{2} (485 sq mi)
- Designation: Scottish Government
- Established: 2014
- Operator: Marine Scotland

The basin floor, which is all deeper than 1,000 m, is characterised by a muddy seabed that is home to various echinoderms, including sea cucumber, starfish and sea urchins. The seabed is affected by an unusual example of polygonal faults that produce relief on the seabed, which provides a habitat for deep-sea sponges, such as the bird's nest sponge (Pheronema carpenteri). The aggregation of sponges along these features alter the surrounding seabed such that other animals, such as brittlestars can thrive.

In 2014 an area of 1,256 square kilometres (485 sq mi) of the Hatton-Rockall Basin was declared a Nature Conservation Marine Protected Area. The MPA is designated a Category IV protected area by the International Union for Conservation of Nature.
