= George Bligh Bank =

Seamount in the Rockall Trough in the northeast Atlantic, west of Scotland

George Bligh Bank is a seamount that lies in the Rockall Trough in the northeast Atlantic, west of Scotland, centred at approximately 59°N, 14°W at the northern end of both the Hatton and Rockall Banks.

George Bligh Bank is part of the Rockall-Hatton Plateau, a large piece of continental crust that separated from the northwest European continental margin around 100 million years ago. It is not of volcanic origin and thus is not recognized as a seamount under the OSPAR Convention, even though it rises more than 1000 m from the surrounding seafloor. The bank is a roughly circular feature about 75 km in diameter with a summit at approximately 450 m rising from a depth of over 1000 m. The ‘moat’ around the base of George Bligh Bank deepens from north to south and is deeper than 1650 m in the south.

Lack of sediment cover on the upper flanks and summit of George Bligh Bank is thought to be related to increased current flow as a result of the topography.

Photographic and video observations were made on George Bligh Bank during 2005, covering a depth range from 425 to 1338 m. Diverse communities of sedentary suspension-feeding organisms were observed along five of the seven transects, with some evidence of localised hard coral (Lophelia pertusa) frameworks. Community composition on George Bligh Bank is similar to those observed on other hard substrata in the deep northeast Atlantic.

George Bligh Bank is named after the fisheries research vessel RV George Bligh that discovered the seamount during her maiden voyage in service with the Ministry of Agriculture, Fisheries and Food (United Kingdom) in April 1921

In October 2020 the seamount was made part of the West of Scotland Marine Protected Area by the Scottish Government in attempt to protect the area's ecology.
