= Rockall–Porcupine margin =

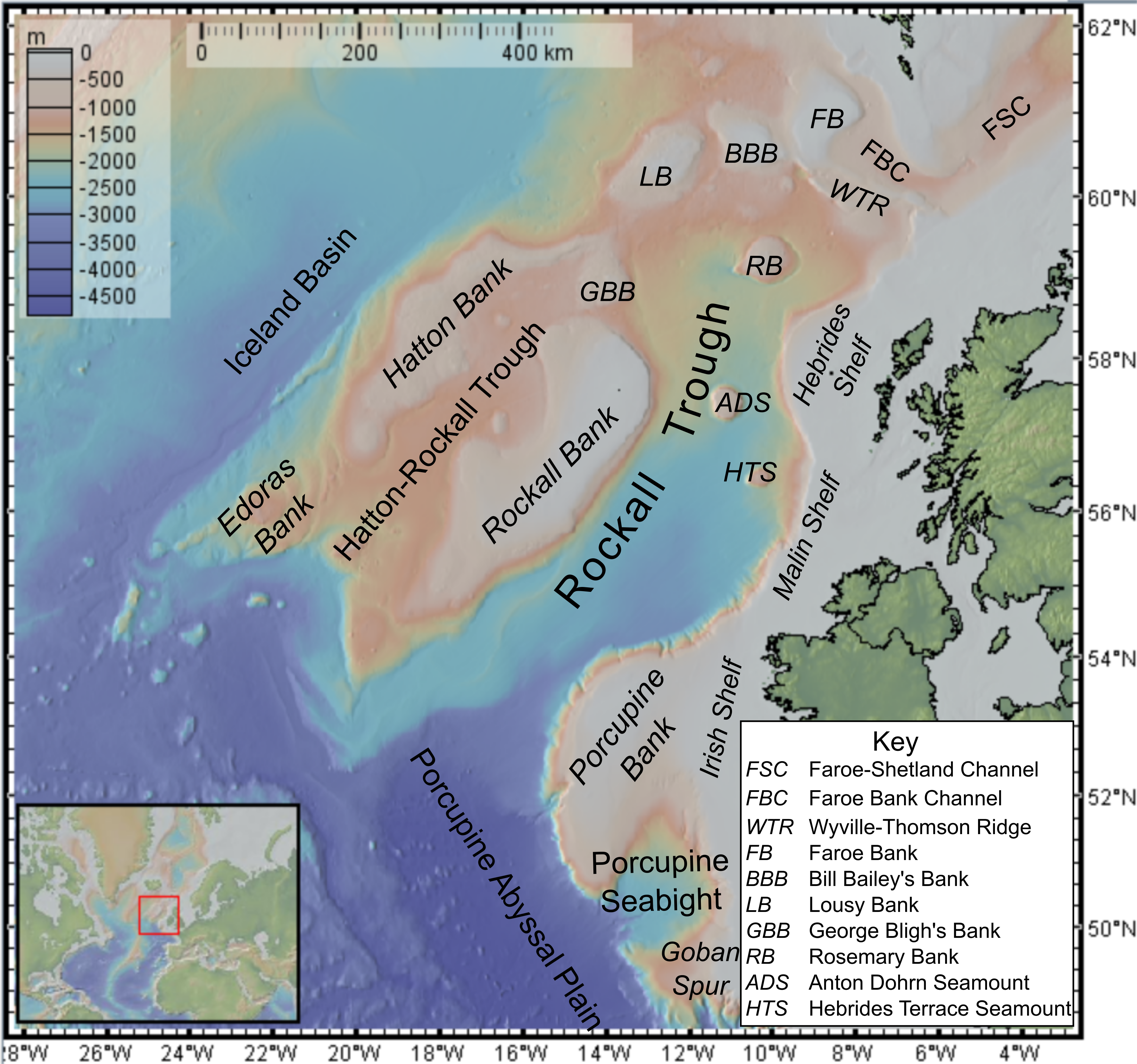
Bathymetric map of the Rockall–Porcupine margin

The Rockall–Porcupine margin or Irish-Scottish margin is part of the continental margin of Northwestern Europe, lying to the west of Ireland and Scotland. The margin is unusually extensive, ranging from 600 km to 1,000 km away from the nearest land. It consists of a series of relative bathymetric highs, known as banks, with intervening deep water troughs containing several seamounts. It formed as a result of multiple periods of rifting, continuing intermittently through the whole of the Mesozoic era, culminating in break-up at the end of the Paleocene epoch, forming the northern Atlantic Ocean.

== Topography ==
The topography of the Rockall–Porcupine margin consists of a series of relatively shallow water banks, with intervening deeper water areas. To the west of the Scottish and Irish landmasses, the continental shelf is formed by the Hebrides Shelf in the north, the Malin Shelf, which straddles the UK–Ireland boundary, and the Irish Shelf. To the southwest of Ireland, beyond the Irish Shelf, lies the deepwater Porcupine Seabight, with the Goban Spur to the south and the Porcupine Bank to the north and west, dividing the seabight from the Rockall Trough. The deepwater Rockall Trough extends for about 1,000 km from the Porcupine Abyssal Plain in the south, to the Wyville-Thomson Ridge in the north. There are a group of seamounts in the northern Rockall Trough, including the Hebrides Terrace, the Anton Dohrn and Rosemary Bank seamounts. To the northwest of the Rockall Trough a series of highs is developed between the trough and the Iceland Basin of the northern North Atlantic. In the northeastern part the intervening high is narrow and segmented into the George Bligh, Lousy and Bill Bailey banks. To the southwest, the high is much broader and is known as the Rockall Plateau. On the southeastern side of the plateau is the Rockall Bank, on the northwestern side are the smaller Edoras Bank and the larger Hatton Bank. In the centre of the plateau is the Hatton–Rockall Trough (or Basin).

== Geology ==
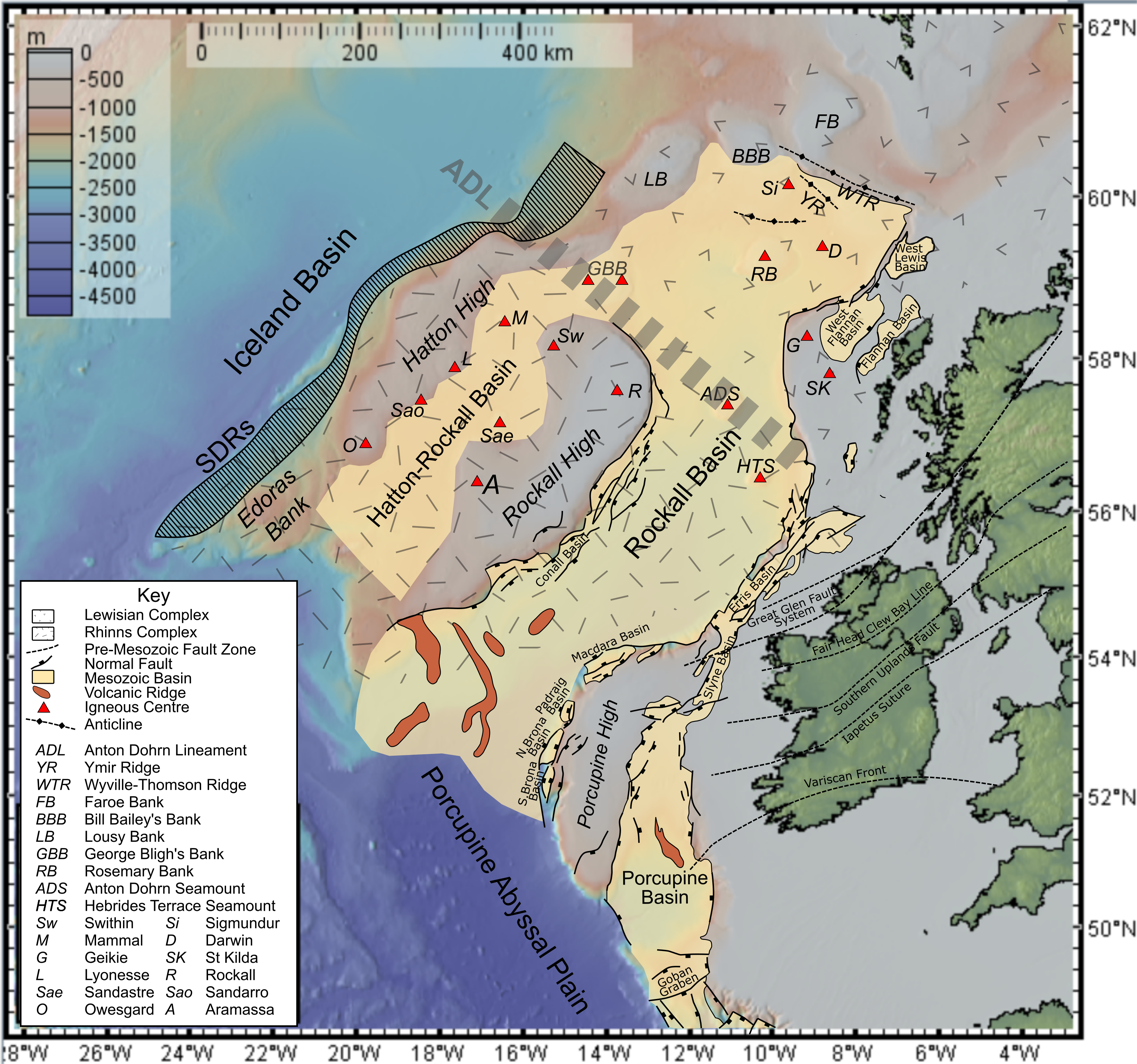
Geology of the margin

The structure of the Rockall-Porcupine region is mostly the result of Mesozoic rifting. However, before the Triassic, the margin was formed of several contrasting crustal blocks. To the north of the Great Glen Fault system, the crust is Paleoproterozoic or older in age, although two distinct blocks have been identified, the Lewisian complex to the northeast and rocks correlated with the Rhinns complex to the southwest. The boundary between these two blocks has been correlated with the northwest–southeast trending Anton Dohrn Lineament. The Great Glen Fault system is interpreted to extend west of Ireland, crossing the Porcupine Basin and Porcupine Bank, continuing into the eastern Rockall Basin. This is the most northerly of a set of major sub-parallel fault zones of Caledonian age, including the Fair Head–Clew Bay lineament, the Southern Uplands Fault and the Iapetus Suture. Further south, the eastern flank of the Porcupine Basin is assumed to be crossed by the Variscan front.

The oldest preserved unmetamorphosed sedimentary rocks are Carboniferous in age, interpreted to be deposited as two sequences, before and after the Variscan orogeny. They are known from the northern Porcupine Basin and the Slyne and Erris Basins to the north. Late Permian syn-rift deposits are recorded from the Slyne Basin. Sequences of Triassic age are known from drilling results or interpreted from seismic data along the eastern part of the margin from the Porcupine Basin, both flanks of the Irish sector of the Rockall Basin, through the Slyne and Erris basins up to the West Lewis Basin on the eastern flank of the northern UK Rockall Basin. Most of the faults that bound the Triassic sequences are thought to be of Jurassic age. The current rift basin geometries are interpreted to have developed during the middle to late Jurassic in the Porcupine Basin, Slyne and Erris basins and probably in the Rockall Basin. The late Jurassic period saw the greatest degree of crustal stretching, with hyperextension developed in the southern half of both the Rockall and Porcupine basins, although the amount of true oceanic crust that formed is thought to be limited. This rifting event is thought to have stopped in the earliest Cretaceous in the Porcupine Basin, although the lack of well penetrations and the general poor imaging in the Rockall Basin due to later intrusions mean that models that include significant rifting in the early Cretaceous there cannot be ruled out.

Volcanic ridge systems have been interpreted in both the southern Rockall and Porcupine basins. In the Rockall basin there are at least four ridges, known as the Barra Volcanic Ridge System, originally described in 1988, when they were dated as early Cretaceous in age. More recently, these ridges have been interpreted as intrusions that were formed as part of the North Atlantic Igneous Province and therefore of Paleocene to Eocene age. In the Porcupine Basin, the Porcupine Median Volcanic Ridge has been interpreted as an extensive (>85 km in length) set of coalesced volcanic features formed during the early Cretaceous. The Porcupine Basin is also interpreted to have been uplifted during the early Cretaceous by 200–700 m. This transient uplift and the contemporaneous volcanic ridges may be related to the presence of anomalously hot mantle. Scientific drilling on the Porcupine High shows that most of the Lower Cretaceous sequence is missing with only a thin Aptian to Upper Cretaceous sequence preserved. Albian age sediments were also penetrated on the Hatton High in a window through Paleogene lavas, although these were faulted, folded and subsequently eroded (with removal of an estimated ~1,500 m of younger beds) before deposition of a thin sequence of Plio-Pleistocene age. From the analysis of seismic velocities, it is thought likely that rocks of similar age are present in the Hatton-Rockall Basin, although the possibility of an older Mesozoic section cannot be ruled out. Thick Upper Cretaceous sequences are developed in the Porcupine and Rockall basins, while rocks of this age are thin on the Porcupine High and missing on the Hatton and Rockall highs.

The Paleocene period saw the onset of magmatism in the North Atlantic Igneous Province at about 62 million years ago, continuing up to the start of the Eocene. On the Rockall-Porcupine margin this magmatism is expressed as extensive lava flows on the highs associated with numerous igneous centres. On the line of eventual break-up between NW Europe and East Greenland, seismic reflection data show well-developed Seaward Dipping Reflectors developed on the northwestern edge of much of the Edoras and Hatton highs, showing that this was a volcanic passive margin. On the Hatton-Rockall High, there are several igneous centres, including the Rockall, Lyonesse, Sandaro, Sandastre, Mammal and George Bligh complexes. In the northern Rockall igneous centres include the Anton Dohrn, Rosemary Bank and Hebrides Terrace seamounts and the Darwin and Geikie igneous centres. Sill complexes are developed in many parts of the Rockall Basin and quite extensively in the Porcupine Basin.

Cenozoic sedimentary rocks reach up to 2 km thick in the Rockall Basin and 4 km thick in the Porcupine Basin. Paleocene sediments, beneath the North Atlantic Igneous Province lavas, are known from the northern Rockall Basin and the West Lewis Basin, passing from non-marine on the basin flanks to fully marine within the basin. Within the Porcupine Basin, the Lower Paleocene interval shows continuation of the Chalk deposition that is characteristic of the underlying Upper Cretaceous. In contrast the Upper Paleocene basin margin sequences are dominated by deltaic sandstones, that continue up into the Eocene. During the late Eocene, water depths increased over the whole margin, leading to the onset of deepwater current circulation. This is marked by a major submarine unconformity, close to the Eocene–Oligocene boundary, which is known as C30. Contourite deposition became widespread in the deepwater areas from the Oligocene onwards. During the Oligocene to Miocene the northern part of the margin was affected by pulses of compression. One of the largest structures formed at this time was the Wyville Thomson Ridge, a 180 km long anticline, trending WNW–ESE, which marks the northern boundary of the Rockall Basin.

== Oceanography ==
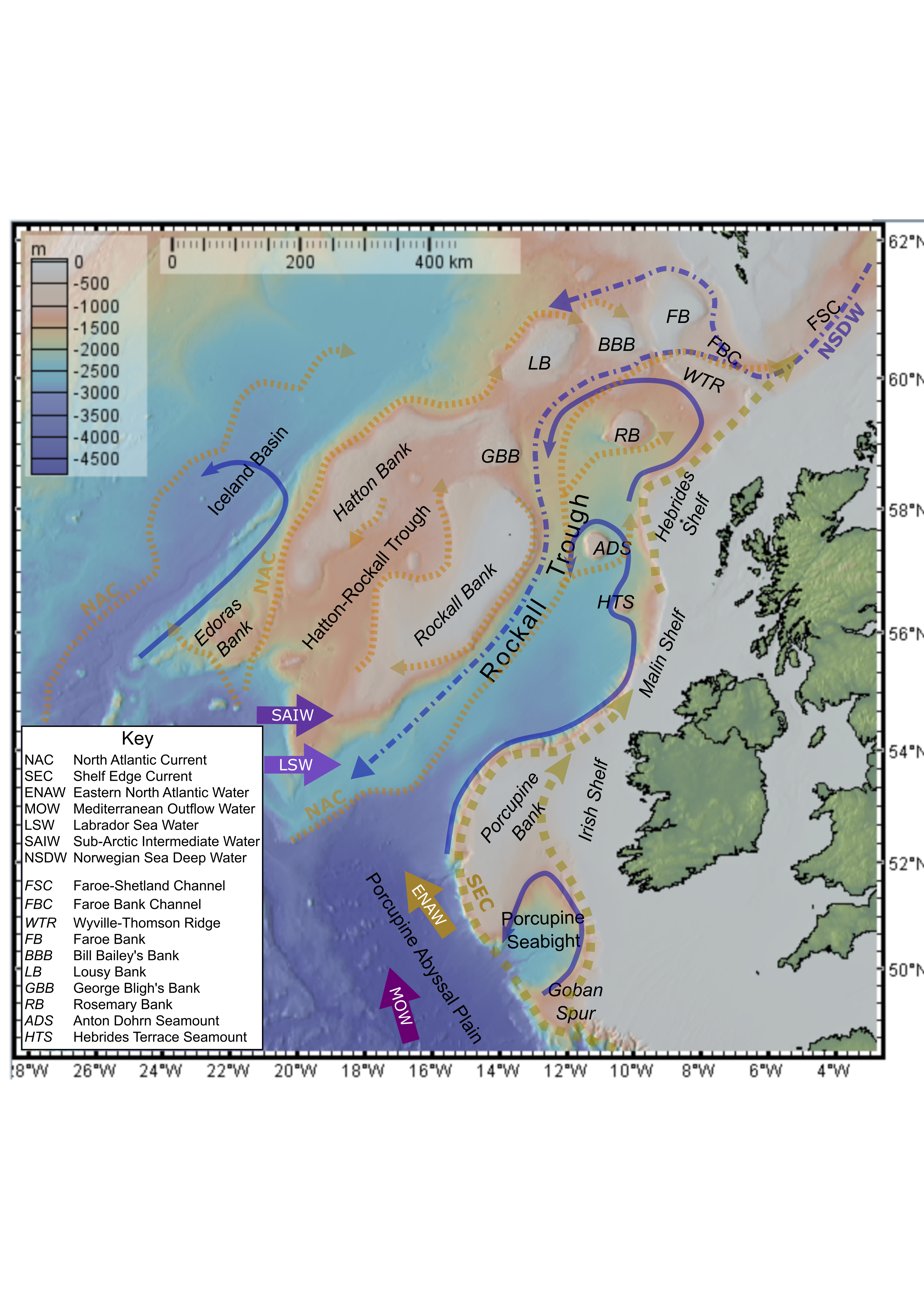
Main direction of movement of water masses into the margin and patterns of circulation

The complex topography of the Rockall-Porcupine margin has a strong influence on the distribution of water masses in the region. Several water masses are known from the margin, including: Antarctic Bottom Water (AABW), North East Atlantic Deep Water (NEADW), Labrador Sea Water (LSW), Mediterranean Overflow Water (MOW), Norwegian Sea Deep Water (NSDW), Subarctic Intermediate Water (SAIW), Eastern North Atlantic Water (ENAW), North Atlantic Central Water (NACW), which are all distinguished by their characteristic temperatures, chemistries and salinities. The AABW water mass is found only in the deepest areas below about 4,000 m such as in the Porcupine Abyssal Plain. It partly mixes with the overlying NEADW, which is found in the deeper parts of the Porcupine Seabight and the Rockall Trough over a depth range of about 4,000 m to 2,000 m. Above the NEADW the LSW is observed up to a depth of about 1,200 m. To the eastern side the deep water areas the MOW is identified over a depth range of about 1200 m to 700 m. To the west of the Rockall Trough, the same depth interval is identified as SAIW. The uppermost water mass is ENAW or NACW and has a depth range of 100–600 m. There is a permanent thermocline over a depth range of 600–1,000 m, between the warmer shallower waters that interact with the atmosphere and the colder deeper waters.

The AABW is northward moving and enters the southernmost part of the Rockall Trough. The NADW is confined to the Rockall Trough and Porcupine Seabight. The LSW and SAIW both enter the area from the west along the southern edge of the Rockall Plateau, before entering the Rockall Trough and the Porcupine Seabight where they become confined. The MOW moves northwards along the eastern edge of the Atlantic entering the same deeper water areas, although it remains unclear how far north the MOW extends into the Rockall Trough. In the Porcupine Seabight, a strong northward current is observed at about 1,000 m depth. At the northern end of the seabight, the current weakens and turns south along the western margin, forming an anticlockwise circulation. In the Rockall Trough strong northward currents are observed along the eastern margin, which also form an overall clockwise circulation pattern. The northward moving contour currents on the eastern side of the trough involve NADW and LSW, with fast velocities recorded in the 2,000–3,000 m depth range. The southward current on the western margin may involve water from the NSDW that has overflowed the Wyville-Thomson Ridge. At shallower levels the eastern edges of the deeper water areas are affected by the Shelf Edge Current (SEC), which moves northwards in the top 400–500 m, carrying ENAW water. The North Atlantic Current (NAC) carries WNAW water through the Iceland Basin, The Hatton-Rockall Trough and the western Rockall Trough. The ENAW and NACW water masses, carried by the SEC and NAC respectively, increasingly mix as they move northwards through the Rockall Trough, forming a single mass as they enter the Norwegian Sea.

Contour currents transport and deposit sediment along the slopes at the edges of the highs in the form of contourites. Sediment is also transported down the slopes in submarine canyons by turbidity currents. Submarine canyons are widely developed on the south side of the Goban Spur (e.g. the Whittard Canyon), on the eastern side of the Porcupine Seabight (the Gollum Channel system), on the western and northern edges of the Porcupine Bank and along the margins of the southwestern Rockall Plateau. During the last glaciation, glacial material was transported to the margin, resulting in the formation of the Barra-Donegal Fan. Ice-rafted blocks are widespread over the margin.

== Ecology ==
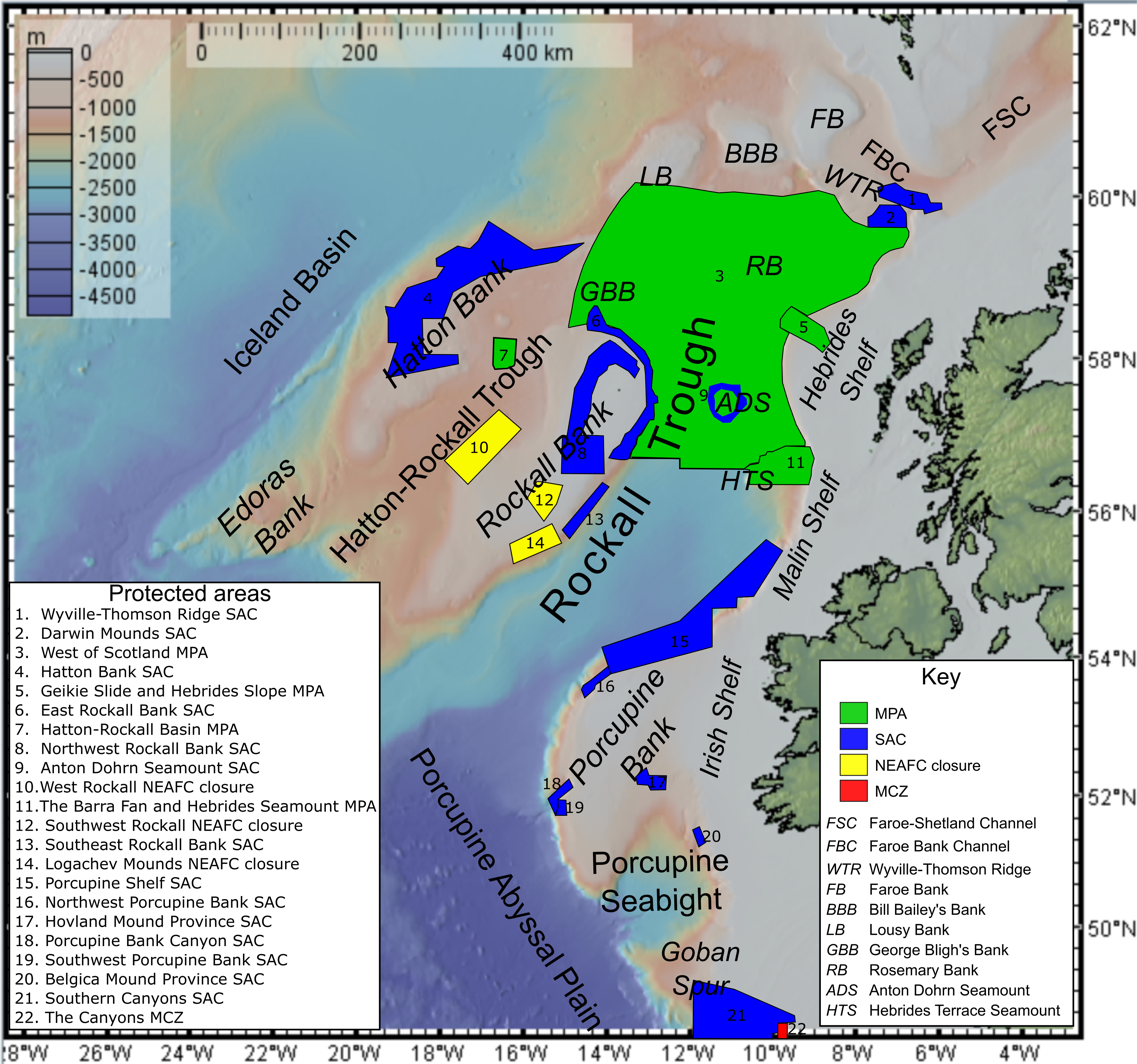
Marine protected areas of the Rockall-Porcupine margin

The two large shallow areas in the margin, the Rockall and Porcupine banks, both well above the thermocline, are regions of high biological productivity, which influence the surrounding areas, as organic material is transported down slope into the deeper basins. This material is then transported laterally along the slopes by the contour currents, providing food for a variety of organisms.

The area supports cold-water coral colonies and carbonate mound fields such as the Logachev Mounds; the trough supports a rich deep sea fish population. There are also unusual aggregations of deep-sea sponges, in particular the encrusting sponge and bird's nest sponge. A range of other species are found amongst the sponge beds, which are considered biodiversity hotspots. For the bird's nest sponge associated species include ascidians, Foraminifera, polychaetes and burrowing anemones, whilst for the encrusting sponge beds species such as sea anemones, ascidians, crinoids and ophiuroids are found. The area is also home to brittlestars: filter feeders which live on the seabed.

Fish that are found over the margin include both pelagic (found within the water column) and demersal (living and feeding on or near the water bottom) species. Information about the types of fish found, their depth ranges and abundance come mainly from longlining and bottom trawling respectively.

Deepwater shark species, such as the birdbeak dogfish, leafscale gulper shark and the portuguese dogfish, are often the target of commercial fishing or form large percentages of the bycatch. These sharks all have long reproductive cycles that involve slow rates of growth, late maturation, and the production of small numbers of young. This makes them highly vulnerable to exploitation and, as apex predators in these habitats, any major reduction in abundance is likely to have significant affects on the ecosystem.

The distribution of cetaceans around the margin has been studied using a mix of passive acoustic monitoring, direct observations from boats and to a lesser extent from the air. Blue whales are occasionally seen in both the Rockall Trough and the Porcupine Seabight. Other baleen whales recorded are Sei, found occasionally from the Goban Spur to the Hatton-Rockall Basin, Fin whales are commonest in the summer and are distributed across the margin, Minke whales are commonest in spring and are also found across the margin, and Humpback whales that are only observed occasionally in the spring and summer. A single Northern right whale has been recorded from the area. Amongst the beaked whales, the Northern bottlenose whale is the commonest, being recorded in the Rockall Trough, Porcupine Bank and Hatton-Rockall Basin. Cuvier's beaked whale is known from the northwestern margin of the Porcupine Bank, Sowerby's beaked whale from the northern Rockall Trough and the Edoras Bank, and a single record of a group of True's beaked whales in the Rockall Trough. The Sperm whale, the largest of the toothed whales, is known from most of the margin, particularly along the eastern edge of the whole extent of the Rockall Trough. Ten species of oceanic dolphins have been recorded, the Common dolphin, which is the commonest, Orca, False killer whale, Long-finned pilot whale. Risso's dolphin, Striped dolphin, Atlantic white-sided dolphin, Bottlenose dolphin, White-beaked dolphin and Harbour porpoise. The abundance and distribution of cetaceans still show the influence of whaling, which ceased in middle of the 20th-century, particularly in the case of the northern right whale and the sei whale. The northern right whale probably became locally extinct at that time, with the only individual observed over the margin most likely coming from the remaining western Atlantic population. Cetacean populations are potentially vulnerable to acoustic interference from both military sonar and the acquisition of seismic reflection data for hydrocarbon exploration.

The effects of commercial fisheries on the habitats found across the margin have been widely studied, with evidence found of significant destruction of seafloor communities by bottom trawling and large amounts of bycatch (non target species taken) associated with longlining and bottom trawling. This led to calls for restrictions to be brought in for these fishing methods, including the banning of bottom trawling over large areas and attempts to significantly reduce the amount of bycatch in longlining.

In 2023, there were 22 areas afforded some level of protection across the margin. These include four Marine Protected Areas (MPAs), fourteen Special Areas of Conservation (SACs), three North-East Atlantic Fisheries Commission (NEAFC) closures and one Marine Conservation Zone (MCZ). The largest of these is the West of Scotland MPA, which covers an area of 107,773 km^{2}, and is contiguous with the Geikie Slide and Slope MPA (2,215 km^{2}), the Darwin Mounds SAC (1,377 km^{2}), the East Rockall Bank SAC (3,645 km^{2}) and the Barra Fan and Hebrides Terrace Seamount MPA (4,373 km^{2}). The purpose of these protected areas is to prevent further damage to vulnerable ecosystems and hopefully to allow recovery of areas that have suffered damage. Repeat monitoring of the Darwin Mounds, protected since 2004, in 2011 and 2019 suggest that any such recovery is likely to be extremely slow, possibly taking centuries.
