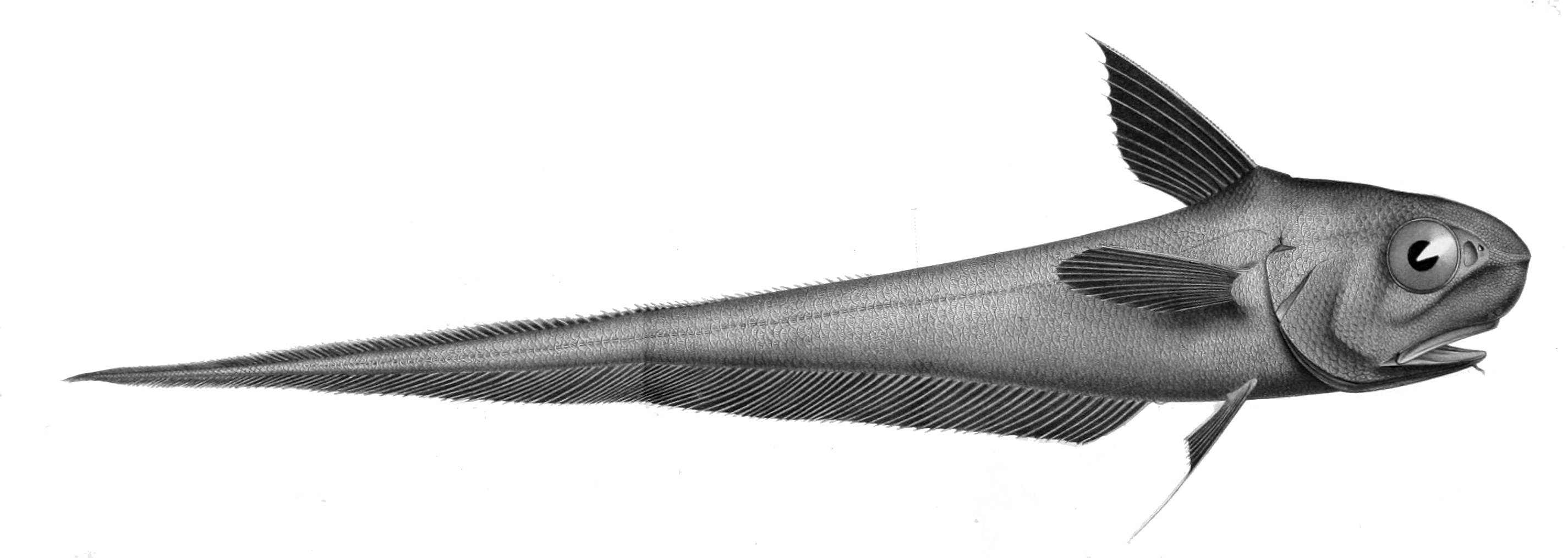

Conservation status
- Critically Endangered (IUCN 3.1)

Scientific classification
- Kingdom: Animalia
- Phylum: Chordata
- Class: Actinopterygii
- Order: Gadiformes
- Suborder: Macrouroidei
- Family: Macrouridae
- Genus: Coryphaenoides
- Species: C. rupestris

Binomial name
- Coryphaenoides rupestris Gunnerus, 1765

Synonyms
- Coryphaena rupestris (Gunnerus, 1765); Coryphaenoides (Coryphaenoides) rupestris Gunnerus, 1765; Coryphaenoides norvegicus (Nilsson, 1832); Ledipoleprus norvegicus Nilsson, 1832; Macrourus stroemii Reinhardt, 1825; Macrurus norvegicus (Nilsson, 1832); Macrurus rupestris (Gunnerus, 1765)

= Coryphaenoides rupestris =

Species of fish

Coryphaenoides rupestris is a species of marine ray-finned fish in the family Macrouridae. Its common names include the rock grenadier, the roundnose grenadier and the roundhead rat-tail. In France it is known as grenadier de roche and in Spain as granadero de roca. It is a large, deep-water species and is fished commercially in the northern Atlantic Ocean.

== Description ==
The roundnose grenadier is a deep water fish sometimes reaching over a metre (yard) in length. The rounded head is large with a broad snout, the abdomen small and the tail long and tapering to a pointed tip. At the front of the snout there is a blunt, tube-like scute or scale and there is a small barbel under the chin. There are three rows of small teeth at the front of the mouth but only one row at the back. The scales on the body are densely packed and covered with small spines. The dorsal fin has two spines and 8 to 11 soft rays and the pelvic fin has 7 to 8 soft rays, the outer one of which is greatly elongated. The general body colour is brownish-grey but the inside of the mouth, the orbits round the eyes, the gill cavities and the fins are dark brownish black.

== Distribution ==
The roundnose grenadier is found in the northern Atlantic Ocean at depths between 400 and 1,200 m (1,300 and 3,900 ft) and occasionally at much greater depths. It tends to spend the summer in deep waters and the winter in shallower locations. Its range normally extends from Baffin Island, Greenland, Iceland and Norway south to the New England Seamounts and North Africa. It is found on continental shelves and in the vicinity of seamounts and knolls.

== Biology ==
The roundnose grenadier sometimes forms dense shoals at depths of about 600 to 900 metres (2,000 to 3,000 ft). It makes a daily vertical migration, returning later to the seabed where it feeds on small invertebrates including shrimps, amphipods and cumaceans, and to a lesser extent, cephalopods and various fishes, including lanternfishes. The roundnose grenadier is a batch spawner and is believed to migrate to the vicinity of Iceland to spawn in late summer or autumn. The females reach maturity when they are nine to eleven years old and the males when they are rather younger. Up to 35,000 eggs can be produced at a time.

== Fishery ==
Commercial fishing for the roundnose grenadier started in the 1960s. The former USSR, Poland, and the German Democratic Republic were the main countries involved, sending factory ships to undertake midwater trawls in the Atlantic Ocean. Catches peaked at over 80,000 tonnes (88,000 short tons) in 1971. More recently, French and Spanish vessels have predominated and the total annual catch has been under 20,000 tonnes (22,000 short tons) in most years since 1980. The flesh of the fish is white with a pleasant texture and is sold as seafood. In 2010 in the United Kingdom, the roundnose grenadier was listed as a "UK Priority Species" for conservation purposes on the grounds that it is a long-lived fish taking many years to mature and that numbers were declining. It was suggested that if no actions to conserve the fish were taken, it would become extinct within the next 10 years.
