= 1904 in the United Kingdom =

Events from the year 1904 in the United Kingdom.

== Incumbents ==
- Monarch – Edward VII
- Prime Minister – Arthur Balfour (Coalition)

== Events ==
- 1 January – Number plates are introduced as cars are licensed for the first time. A speed limit of 20 miles per hour (32 km/h) is introduced.
- 25 January – Halford Mackinder's influential paper The Geographical Pivot of History is delivered to the Royal Geographical Society in London.
- 26 January
  - Daily Mirror re-launched as a daily morning pictorial newspaper using photographs.
  - Financier Whitaker Wright commits suicide at the Royal Courts of Justice in London immediately following his conviction for fraud.
- 12 March – Britain's first surface electric trains begin running from Liverpool to Southport on the Lancashire and Yorkshire Railway.
- 26 March – 80,000 demonstrators gather in Hyde Park, London, to protest against the importation of Chinese labourers to South African gold mines.
- 8 April – Entente Cordiale signed between the United Kingdom and France.
- 25 April – Herbert Beerbohm Tree establishes an Academy of Dramatic Art, which will become RADA, at His Majesty's Theatre in the Haymarket (London).
- May – Royal Horticultural Society completes the move of its demonstration garden to RHS Garden, Wisley, Surrey from Chiswick.
- 4 May – Charles Rolls and Henry Royce meet for the first time, at the new Midland Hotel, Manchester, to agree production of Rolls-Royce motor cars; the first produced under their joint names in Manchester are launched in December.
- 24 May – Celebration of Empire Day introduced to the UK by Lord Meath.
- 9 June – The London Symphony Orchestra performs its first concert.
- 28 June – The Danish liner SS Norge is wrecked on Helen's Reef off Rockall with the loss of 635 lives.
- 1 July–23 November – Great Britain and Ireland compete at the 1904 Summer Olympics in St. Louis, Missouri and win one gold and one silver medal.
- 21 July – Official opening of Birmingham Corporation Water Department's scheme bringing water to the city from the Elan Valley Reservoirs in Wales via the Elan aqueduct.
- 3 August – A British expedition under Colonel Francis Younghusband takes Lhasa in Tibet.
- September – Start of 1904–1905 Welsh Christian revival.
- 1 September – Griffin Park football ground, home of Brentford F.C., opens in west London.
- c. October – Mrs H. Millicent McKenzie is appointed Associated Professor of Education at the University College of South Wales and Monmouthshire in Cardiff, the first woman in Britain to hold a professorial title.
- 11 October – Loftus Road football stadium, home of Shepherd's Bush F.C., opens in west London.
- 20 October – Admiral "Jackie" Fisher takes office as First Sea Lord, initiating a period of modernisation of the Royal Navy.
- 21 October – Dogger Bank incident: the Baltic Fleet of the Imperial Russian Navy, heading for the Russo-Japanese War, mistakes British fishing trawlers in the North Sea for Japanese torpedo boats and opens fire, sinking one, and causing serious diplomatic conflict between Russia and Britain.
- Late October – The first members of what will become the Bloomsbury Group move to the Bloomsbury district of London.
- c. November – Finchley fire brigade becomes the first to take delivery of a petrol-engined self-propelled motor fire pump.
- 9 November – Bahamian Dr. Allan Glaisyer Minns becomes Mayor of Thetford, the first Black person to hold such an office in Britain.
- 16 November – John Ambrose Fleming patents the first thermionic vacuum tube, the two-electrode diode ("oscillation valve" or Fleming valve).
- 7 December – Royal Navy torpedo boat destroyer HMS Spiteful (1899) begins sea trials as the first capital warship to be powered solely using fuel oil.
- 10 December
  - John Strutt, 3rd Baron Rayleigh wins the Nobel Prize in Physics "for his investigations of the densities of the most important gases and for his discovery of argon in connection with these studies".
  - William Ramsay wins the Nobel Prize in Chemistry "in recognition of his services in the discovery of the inert gaseous elements in air, and his determination of their place in the periodic system".
- 24 December – The Coliseum Theatre in London opens.
- 27 December – The stage play Peter Pan, or The Boy Who Wouldn't Grow Up premières in London.

=== Undated ===
- Hill House, Helensburgh, Scotland, designed by Charles Rennie Mackintosh, completed.
- Licensing Act permits magistrates to refuse renewal of a pub licence if there are sufficient in the area (on payment of compensation).
- Victoria University dissolved, its remaining constituents, Victoria University of Manchester and the University of Leeds, becoming independent institutions.

== Publications ==
- G. K. Chesterton's novel The Napoleon of Notting Hill.
- Joseph Conrad's novel Nostromo.
- W. H. Hudson's novel Green Mansions: a romance of the tropical forest.
- Hermann Muthesius' study Das englische Haus begins publication in Berlin.
- Frederick Rolfe's novel Hadrian the Seventh.
- Saki's short story collection Reginald.
- Report of the Inter-Departmental Committee on Physical Deterioration.

== Births ==
- 13 January – Richard Addinsell, composer (died 1977)
- 14 January
  - Cecil Beaton, photographer (died 1980)
  - Hector Grey, Scottish street trader and company director (died 1985)
- 18 January – Cary Grant, actor (died 1986)
- 11 February – Roy MacNairy, cricketer (died 1962)
- 28 February – Anthony Havelock-Allan, film producer (died 2003)
- 1 March – Margaret Steuart Pollard, née Gladstone, oriental scholar, bard of the Cornish Gorsedd, philanthropist and eccentric (died 1996)
- 6 March – Hugh Williams, actor and dramatist (died 1969)
- 8 March – C. R. Boxer, historian (died 2000)
- 30 March – Wilfred White, equestrian (died 1995)
- 8 April – John Hicks, economist, Nobel Prize laureate (died 1989)
- 14 April
  - Sir John Gielgud, actor (died 2000)
  - Elizabeth Irving, actress (died 2003)
- 23 April – Ivor Montagu, aristocrat, documentary film maker, table tennis player and Communist activist (died 1984)
- 26 April – Jimmy McGrory, footballer (died 1982)
- 27 April – Cecil Day-Lewis, poet (died 1972)
- 6 May – Max Mallowan, archaeologist (died 1978)
- 8 May – John Snagge, radio personality (died 1996)
- 20 May – Margery Allingham, writer (died 1966)
- 26 May – George Formby, entertainer (died 1961)
- 28 May
  - George Beck, Roman Catholic prelate, Archbishop of Liverpool (died 1978)
  - Margaret Harris, costume designer (died 2000)
- 4 June – Jack Lauterwasser, racing cyclist (died 2003)
- 6 June – Lesley Blanch, writer and fashion editor (died 2007)
- 8 June – Angus McBean, photographer (died 1990)
- 24 June – Francis Leslie Ashton, writer (died 1994)
- 1 July – Gordon Gunson, footballer (died 1991)
- 4 July – Angela Baddeley, actress (died 1976)
- 5 July – Josephine Wilson, actress (died 1990)
- 10 July – Tom Tippett, footballer (died 1997)
- 12 July – Edward Max Nicholson, environmentalist (died 2003)
- 14 July – Richard Clarkson, aeronautical engineer (died 1996)
- 27 July – Anton Dolin, dancer and choreographer (died 1983)
- 16 August – Mollie Maureen, actress (died 1987)
- 19 August – George de la Warr, alternative physician (died 1969)
- 24 August – Ida Cook, campaigner for Jewish Holocaust refugees and (as Mary Burchell) romance novelist (died 1986)
- 26 August – Christopher Isherwood, novelist (died 1986)
- 19 September – Enid Hattersley, politician (died 2001)
- 29 September – Greer Garson, actress (died 1996)
- 2 October – Graham Greene, author (died 1991)
- 7 October – Cyril Horn, speed skater (died 1987)
- 20 October – Anna Neagle, actress (died 1986)
- 31 October – Elisabeth Collins, painter and sculptor (died 2000)
- 2 November – Hugh Lygon, aristocrat (died 1936)
- 11 November – J. H. C. Whitehead, mathematician (died 1960)
- 14 November
  - Harold Larwood, fast bowler (cricket) (died 1995)
  - Michael Ramsey, Archbishop of Canterbury (died 1988)
- 16 November – Norman Feather, nuclear physicist (died 1978)
- 9 December – Alan King-Hamilton, barrister and judge (died 2010)
- 12 December – Edward Pilgrim, victim of bureaucracy (died 1954)

== Deaths ==
- 17 January – Sir Henry Keppel, admiral (born 1809)
- 26 January – Whitaker Wright, fraudulent financier (born 1846) (suicide)
- 8 February – Alfred Ainger, biographer (born 1837)
- 22 February – Sir Leslie Stephen, writer and critic (born 1832)
- 5 March – John Lowther du Plat Taylor, founder of the Army Post Office Corps (born 1829)
- 17 March – Prince George, Duke of Cambridge, grandson of King George III (born 1819)
- 5 April – Tom Allen, boxing champion (born 1840)
- 16 April – Samuel Smiles, author and reformer (born 1812)
- 8 May
  - Eadweard Muybridge, photographer and motion picture pioneer (born 1830)
  - Frederick York Powell, historian and scholar (born 1850)
- 10 May – Sir Henry Morton Stanley, Welsh explorer and journalist (born 1841)
- 1 July – George Frederic Watts, symbolist painter and sculptor (born 1817)
- 22 July – Wilson Barrett, playwright and actor (born 1846)
- 12 August – William Renshaw, tennis player (born 1861)
- 4 October – Violet Nicolson ("Laurence Hope"), poet (born 1865)
- 7 October – Isabella Bird, explorer, writer, photographer and naturalist (born 1831)
- 12 November – George Lennox Watson, naval architect (born 1851)
- 24 November – Christopher Dresser, designer influential in the Anglo-Japanese style (born 1834)
