= Helen's Reef =

Reef near the Atlantic isle of Rockall

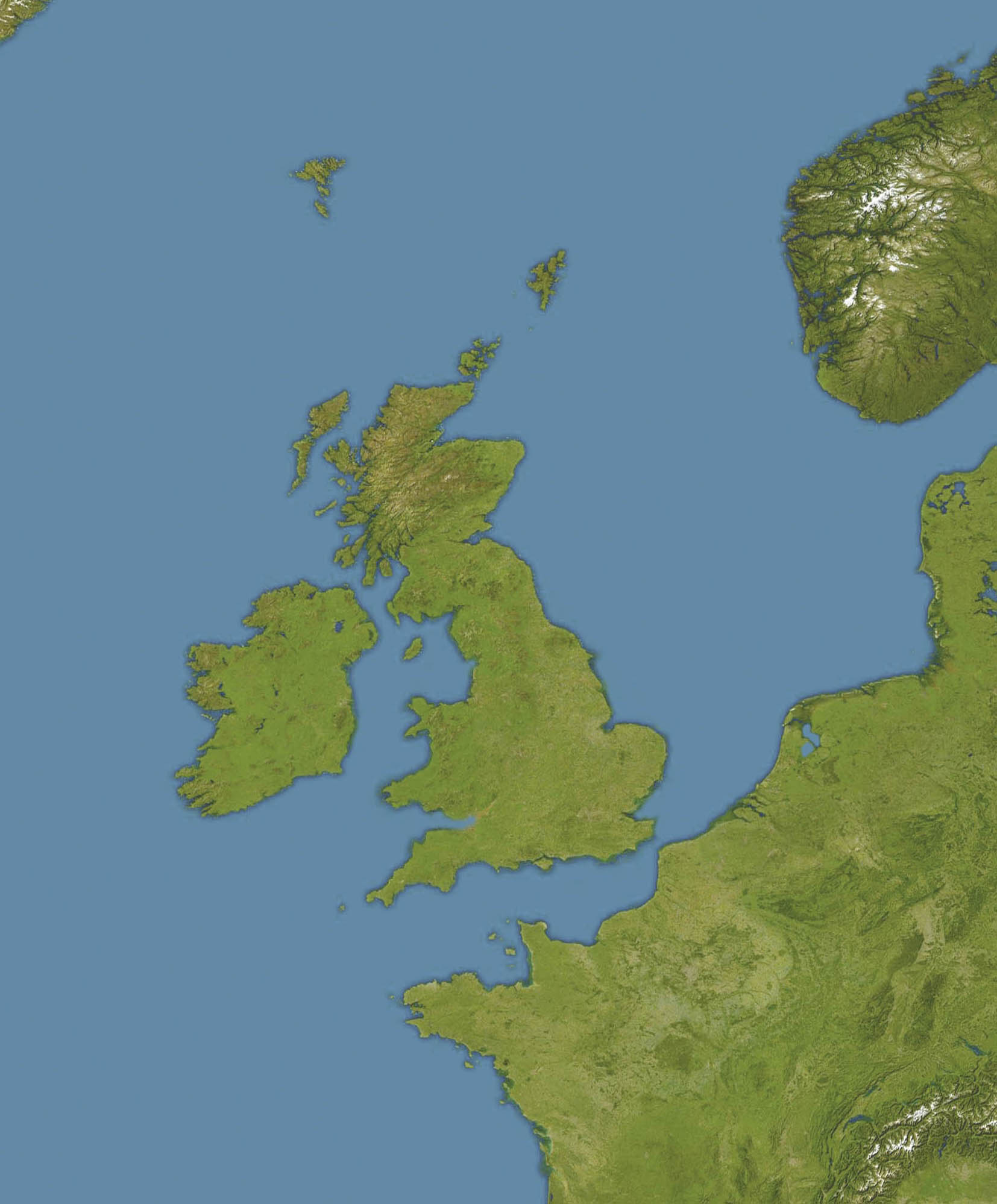
- Location within Oceans around British Isles

Geography
- Location: North-East Atlantic
- Coordinates: 57°36′17″N 13°38′4″W
- Highest elevation: −2 m (-7 ft)

Administration
- United Kingdom

Helen's Reef is a series of skerries in the North Atlantic, two kilometres (one nautical mile) northeast of the larger islet of Rockall and outcrop of Hasselwood Rock, within the United Kingdom's exclusive economic zone. The skerries are covered at high tide or in rough seas, and are often only visible as breaking waves. Its highest elevation is lower than 6 feet under sea level.

It is within the 12-nautical-mile-radius (22-kilometre) territorial waters of Rockall, which is claimed by the UK as of 1955 and incorporated into the UK by the Island of Rockall Act 1972. This claim was previously long disputed by Ireland, but the dispute is resolved as of 31 March 2014.

== History ==
Helen's Reef was named after the brigantine Helen of Dundee, bound for Quebec, which foundered at Hasselwood Rock in 1824. The vessel struck between nine and ten o'clock on the morning of 17 April. After some twelve hours struggling to keep her afloat and make for safety, water had almost filled the hold. The captain ordered the passengers onto the deck with warm clothing. Difficulty was experienced launching the boats, and one had to be repaired after being holed on the stock of the kedge anchor;

On 28 June 1904 the 3,318-ton DFDS steamer SS Norge, with 795 people including 240 children on board bound for New York, foundered on the reef. 635 lives were lost with most of the 163 survivors being taken to Stornoway. The wreck was found a century later in 65 metres (213 ft) of water.

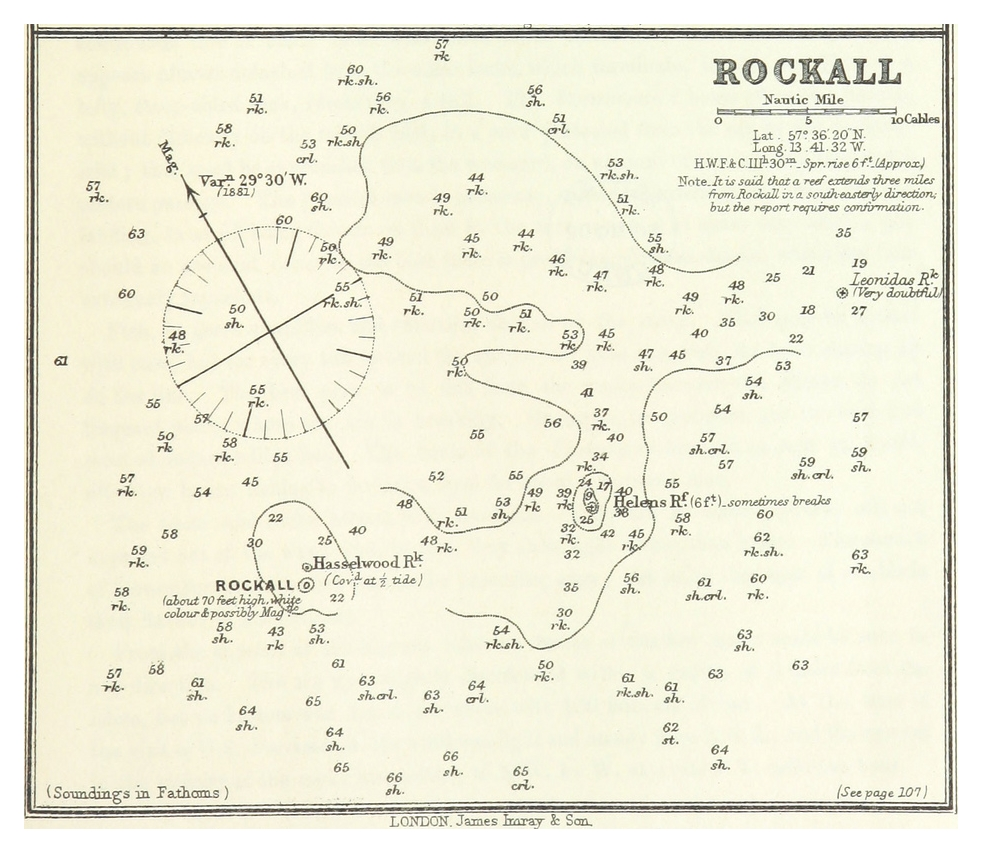
ROCKALL – Nautical chart – Atlantic Sea Pilot, 1884

== Geology ==
Helen's Reef is the tip of a narrow curvilinear shoal rising from 100 metres (330 ft) depth, located approximately 2 miles (3.2 km) east of Rockall Island. The reef coincides with a large negative magnetic anomaly encircling Rockall Island. Echo-sounder traverses and observations by divers have shown that the reef forms a narrow pinnacle that breaches the surface and rises from a plateau at 12 metres (39 ft) depth. That plateau comprises spurs and buttresses with steep or vertical, joint-controlled or columnar-jointed faces descending to 20 metres (66 ft) and 30 metres (98 ft) depth. The south-eastern face is similarly steep and joint controlled, as on Rockall Island. Both Rockall and Helen's Reef may represent resistant stacks formed during a period of lower sea level.

=== Composition ===
Rock samples obtained by divers in the 1970s show that Helen's Reef is predominantly composed of microgabbro with an equigranular (2–3 mm), holocrystalline, subophitic texture. These dark grey samples bear very light grey speckles in the coarser-grained facies. Mineral constituents include unaltered, colourless forsterite, pale green to pale brown pyroxene (endiopside) and plagioclase (bytownite) laths. Chromian magnetite occurs as dispersed cubes and octahedra; although it is a minor phase, its high chromium content (up to 13.5 % Cr_{2}O_{3}) may account for the prominent magnetic anomaly.

In the southern reef, a finer-grained, microporphyritic olivine-dolerite—a rock with small olivine crystals set in a fine-grained matrix—forms a sharp chilled contact against the microgabbro. In the northern reef, local cumulates of olivine and pyroxene with subordinate plagioclase indicate that heavier crystals sank under gravity as the magma cooled. These layered cumulate textures hint at further stratification in the unexplored deeper base of the reef.

Chemical analyses indicate that Helen's Reef rocks differ markedly from tholeiitess of the Mid-Atlantic Ridge but resemble Tertiary gabbroic intrusions, especially olivine-gabbro sills on Skye that belong to the Porphyritic Central Magma Series of Mull and Ardnamurchan.

=== Age and significance ===
Potassium–argon dating of the microgabbro samples yielded a Late Cretaceous age of 81 ± 3 Ma, which predates the 52 ± 9 Ma aegirine granite of Rockall Island and reveals an earlier, previously unsuspected phase of igneous activity in the region.

The Cretaceous magmatism at Helen's Reef may relate to one of two spreading events that isolated the Rockall Plateau microcontinent: the opening of the Rockall Trough in the Middle–Early Cretaceous or the opening of the Labrador Sea beginning around 80 Ma. The positioning of the microgabbros along the western margin of the Rockall Trough favours their intrusion during the trough's formation. This activity may be linked to the early opening of the North Atlantic Ocean, including the contemporaneous formation of the Rockall Trough and the Bay of Biscay.
