= Volutopsius castaneus =

Scientific classification
- Kingdom: Animalia
- Phylum: Mollusca
- Class: Gastropoda
- Subclass: Caenogastropoda
- Order: Neogastropoda
- Family: Buccinidae
- Genus: Volutopsius
- Species: V. castaneus

Binomial name
- Volutopsius castaneus (Mörch, 1858)

Species of gastropod

Volutopsius castaneus is a species of sea snail, a marine gastropod mollusk in the family Buccinidae, the true whelks.
