= Aird an Rùnair =

- Headland
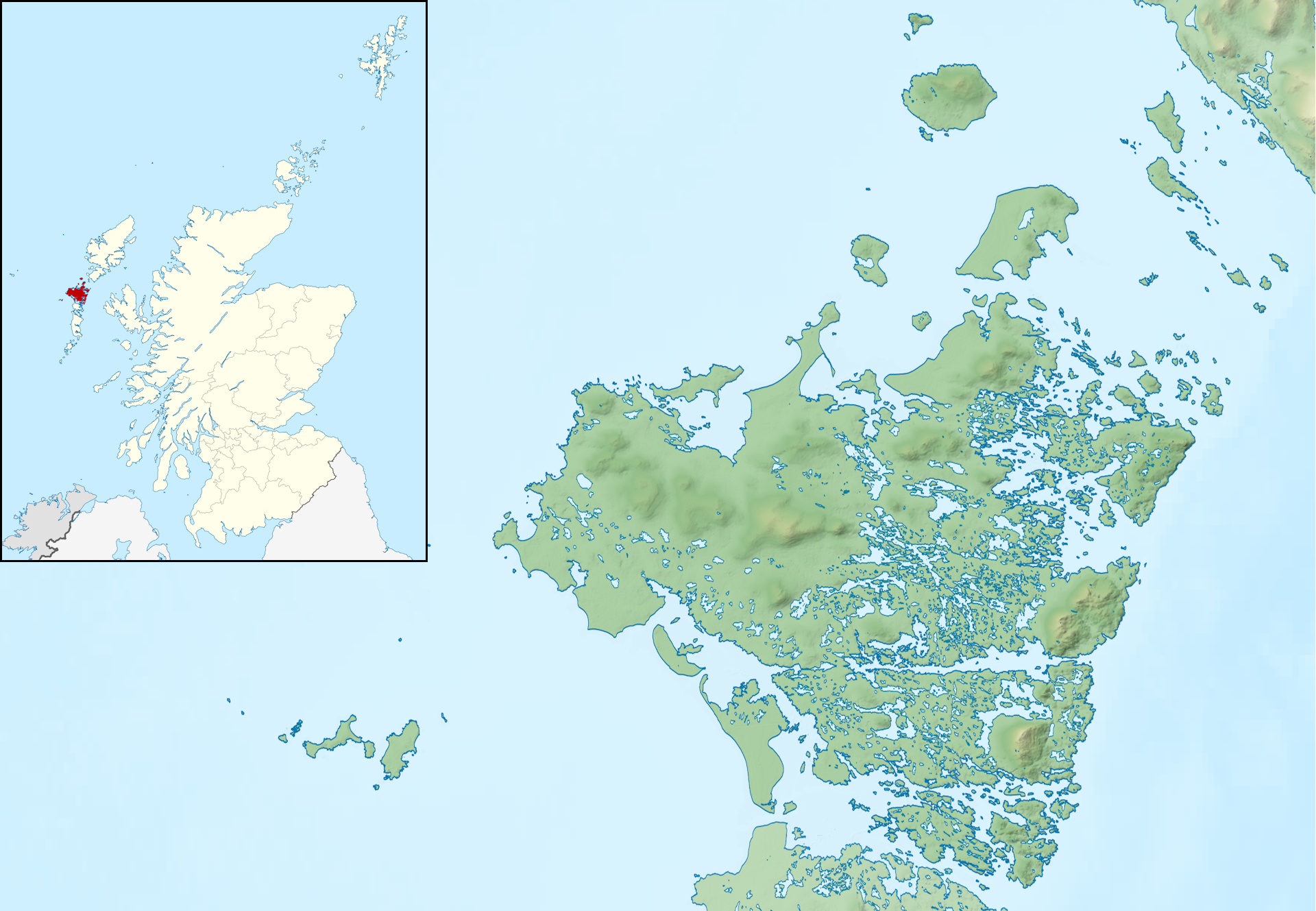
- Location within North Uist
- Coordinates: 57°36′10″N 7°32′39″W
- Grid position: NF 68977 70519

Aird an Rùnair is the most westerly point of the island of North Uist, in the Western Isles, of Scotland. The headland is approximately 4 kilometres (2.5 mi) south-west of Balmartin.

The nearest permanently inhabited settlement to the disputed territory of Rockall is the crofting township of Hogha Gearraidh, 1.5 kilometres (0.93 mi) east of Aird an Rùnair, which is itself 367 kilometres (228 mi), or 198.1 nmi east of the rock.
