= Pyrulofusus =

Scientific classification
- Kingdom: Animalia
- Phylum: Mollusca
- Class: Gastropoda
- Subclass: Caenogastropoda
- Order: Neogastropoda
- Family: Buccinidae
- Genus: Pyrulofusus; Mörch, 1857

Genus of gastropods

Pyrulofusus is a genus of sea snails, marine gastropod mollusks in the family Buccinidae, the true whelks.

== Species ==
Species within the genus Pyrulofusus include:

- Pyrulofusus deformis (Reeve, 1847)
