= Hasselwood Rock =

Skerry in the North Atlantic ocean

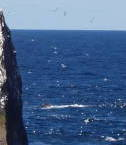
- Hasselwood Rock visible as breaking waves 200 metres north of Rockall

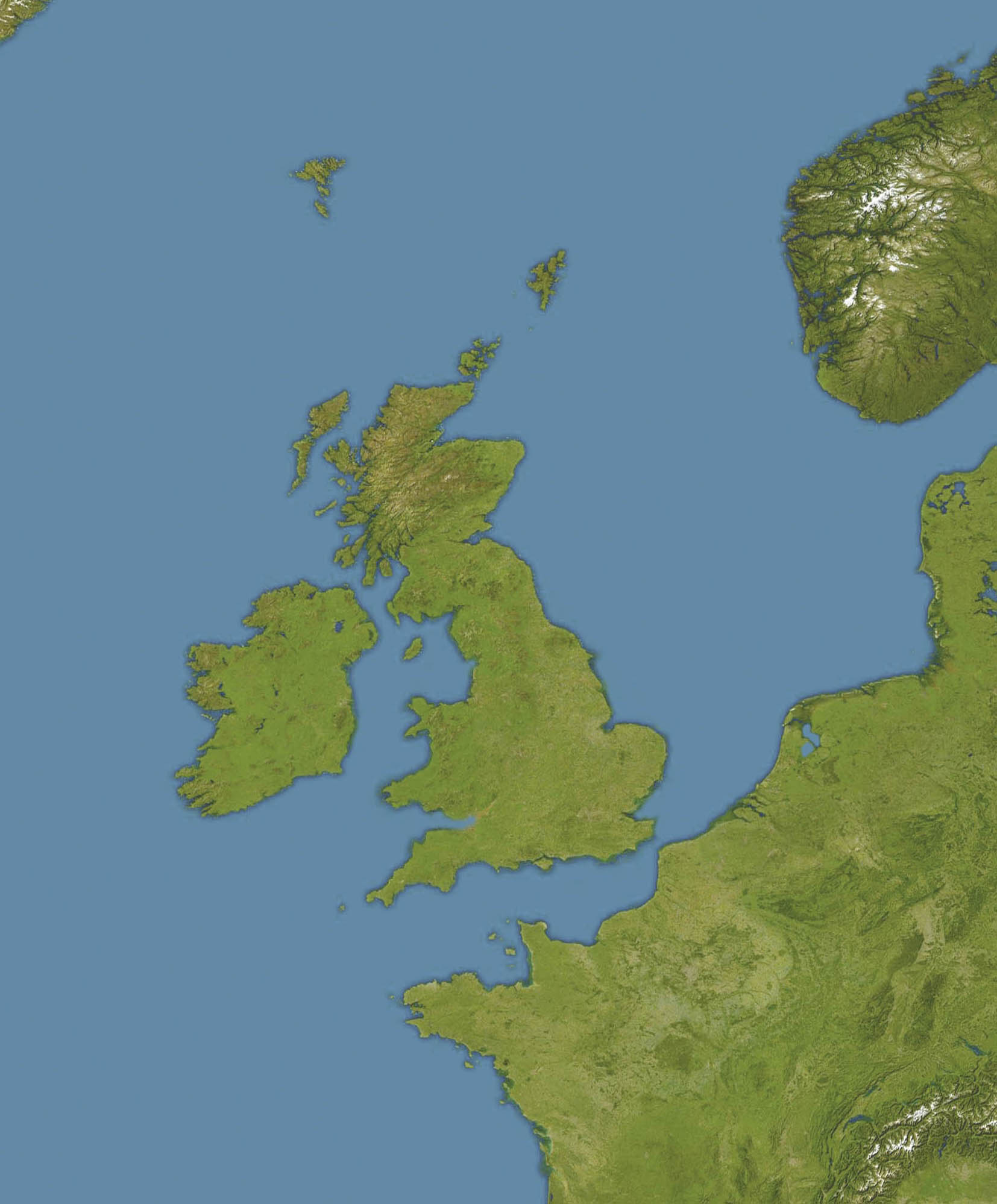
- Location within Oceans around British Isles

Geography
- Location: North Atlantic
- Coordinates: 57°35′52″N 13°41′15″W
- Area: 300 m^{2} (3,200 sq ft)
- Highest elevation: 1 m (3 ft)

Administration
- United Kingdom (Exclusive economic zone)

Hasselwood Rock is a 1-metre-high (3 ft 3 in) uninhabitable skerry 200 metres North of Rockall in the North-east Atlantic Ocean.

== Location and characteristics ==
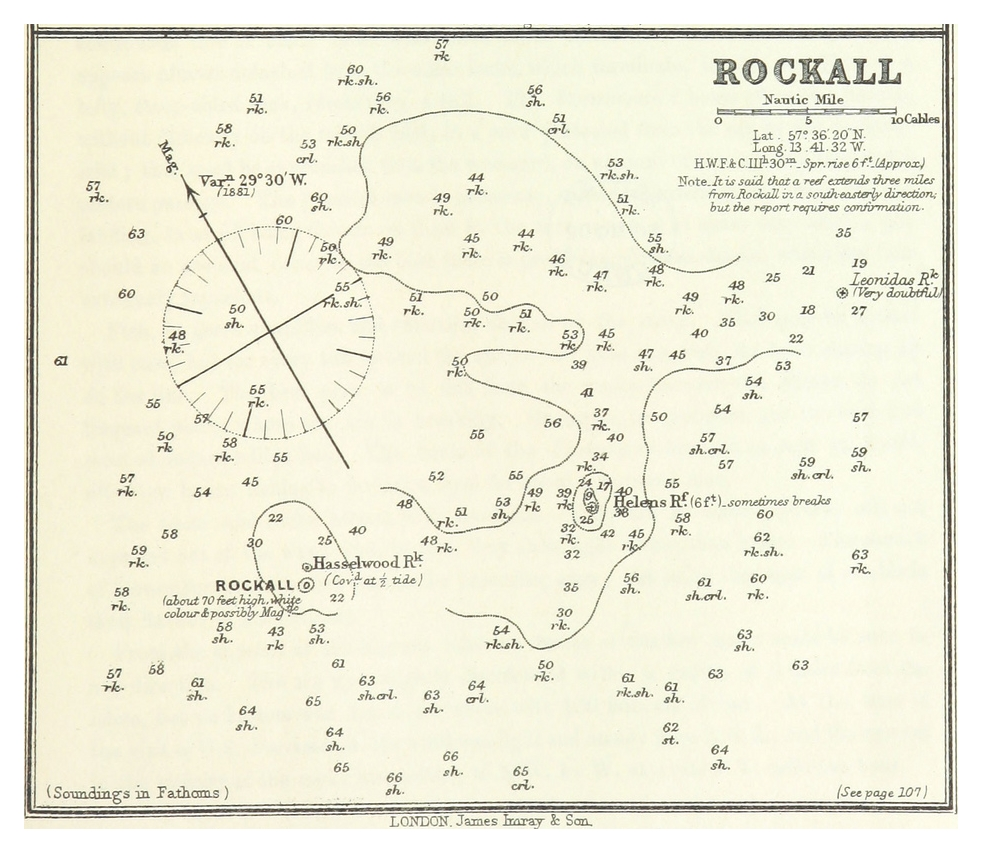
ROCKALL – Nautical chart – Atlantic Sea Pilot, 1884

Hasselwood Rock is some 200 m (660 ft) north of the larger outcrop of Rockall. Expeditions and landings on Hasselwood Rock have not been reported.

The rock is approximately 1 m (3 ft) above low water, and 13 m (43 ft) in diameter, with an area of approximately 130 m^{2} (1,400 sq ft). It is covered at high tide and in heavy seas, often only visible as breaking waves. The only other rocks in the area—those of Helen's Reef—are almost 2 km (1.2 mi) to the north-east.

The upper part of Hasselwood Rock is the destroyed cone of an extinct volcano. The geological composition is unknown.

== SS Norge disaster ==
In 1904, the SS Norge ran aground on the Rock in fog with the loss of over 635 lives. The sinking remains the worst maritime disaster involving a Danish merchant ship. It was the worst civilian disaster in the Atlantic Ocean until the Titanic sank eight years later.
