= Vigia (nautical) =

Warning on a nautical chart indicating an unsurveyed potential hazard

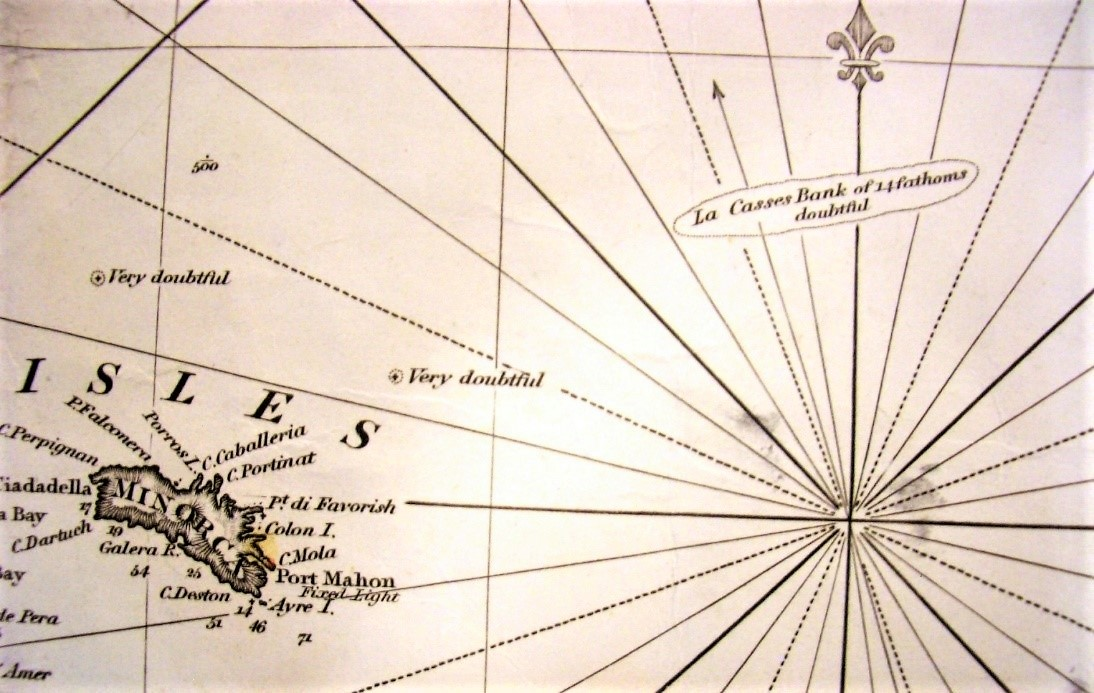
Three vigias marked on JW Norie's 1852 chart of the Mediterranean, "La Casses Bank of 14 fathoms doubtful" (top right), and two "Very doubtful" vigias (left). None of these three features actually exist.

A vigia is a warning on a nautical chart indicating a possible rock, shoal, or other hazard which has been reported but not yet verified or surveyed.

Some nonexistent vigias have remained on successive charts for centuries as a precaution by hesitant hydrographers. One such example was "Las Casses Bank", a vigia between Menorca and Sardinia in the Mediterranean Sea, which first appeared on charts in 1373 and remained on some charts as late as 1852.

Another notable false vigia was 'Aitkins' Rock' off the northwest coast of Ireland, first reported in 1740 with six further reports over the following eighty years the supposed rock was blamed for numerous lost ships. Surveys by the Royal Navy in 1824, 1827, and 1829 failed to locate the rock, until a final extensive six week survey in 1840 using two brigs led to the conclusion that the rock had never existed. Captain Alexander Thomas Emeric Vidal, who led the final survey, noted that such false sightings were likely due to floating debris or whales.

The term vigia is derived from the Spanish vigía or Portuguese vigia, from the Latin vigilia.

== See also ==
- Phantom islands – Island recorded on maps but proven nonexistent
- Terra incognita – "Unknown land", area not mapped by cartographers
