= Rockall =

Uninhabited islet in the North Atlantic Ocean

Disputed island
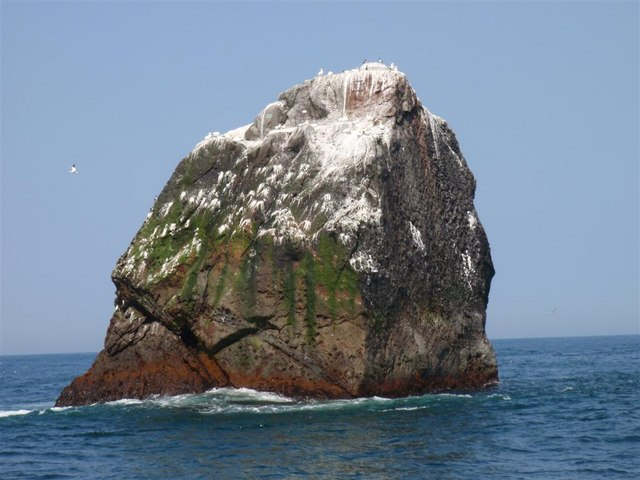
- Rockall's south and east faces, November 2008

- Topographic map centred on Rockall

Geography
- Location: North-east Atlantic
- Coordinates: 57°35′46.7″N 13°41′14.3″W
- OS grid reference: MC035165
- Area: 784.3 m^{2} (8,442 sq ft)
- Highest elevation: 17.15 m (56.27 ft)

Administration
- United Kingdom
- Country: Scotland
- Council area: Comhairle nan Eilean Siar

Demographics
- Population: 0

Rockall (/ˈrɒkɔːl/) is a 17.15-metre-high (56 ft 3 in), uninhabitable granite islet in the North Atlantic Ocean. It is 301 kilometres (187 statute miles; 163 nautical miles) west of Soay, St Kilda, Scotland; 423 kilometres (263 statute miles; 228 nautical miles) north-west of Tory Island, Ireland; and 700 kilometres (430 statute miles; 380 nautical miles) south of Iceland. The nearest permanently inhabited place is in North Uist, 367 kilometres (228 mi; 198 nmi) east in Scotland's Outer Hebrides.

The granite rock from which Rockall is comprised formed during the Paleogene period, by magmatism as part of the North Atlantic Igneous Province. Rockall, Hasselwood Rock, 200 metres north, and the skerries of Helen's Reef two kilometers to the northeast are the only emergent parts of the Rockall Plateau. Twenty-nine-metre waves just east of Rockall were reported in 2006 as the largest ever recorded by scientific instruments in the open ocean.

Rockall has appeared on maps since at least 1550 and in literature since at least 1698. Marine surveyors, scientists, adventurers, amateur radio operators, and environmental activists have variously landed on or briefly occupied the islet. The earliest documented landing on Rockall was in 1811 by a small Royal Navy party led by Basil Hall, prompting its first-named part and only occupiable area, Hall's Ledge. The longest known continuous occupation is 45 days, achieved solo in 2014 by Nick Hancock, a surveyor from Edinburgh.

Possession of Rockall was for many decades deemed imperative to claims to the vast surrounding fisheries and oil-rich Atlantic seabed. The Irish Times claims to have reported on the economic value of Rockall's fisheries as long ago as 1861. To prevent Khrushchev's USSR setting up an equipment base without permission, the United Kingdom claimed Rockall which may have been widely seen as terra nullius in 1955 by official press release, metal plaque with flagpole; and specified it by domestic law as part of Scotland in 1972. The UK claims a 12-nautical-mile (22-kilometre) territorial sea at Rockall. While never claiming sovereignty of Rockall, Ireland maintains that UK claims to Rockall are invalid. Denmark (on behalf of the Faroes) and Iceland have lodged claims of the adjoining seabed.

== Etymology ==
The origin and meaning of the name Rockall is uncertain. The name Rocabarraigh is used in Scots Gaelic folklore for a mythical rock that is supposed to appear three times, its last appearance being at the end of the world: "Nuair a thig Rocabarra ris, is dual gun tèid an Saoghal a sgrios". ('When Rocabarra returns, the world will likely come to be destroyed'). Another idea is the name Rockall derives from the Gaelic Sgeir Rocail, meaning 'skerry of roaring' or 'sea rock of roaring', although rocail can also be translated as 'tearing' or 'ripping'.

The Scottish Gaelic name for Rockall, Ròcal, may derive from an Old Norse name that may contain the element fjall, meaning 'mountain'. It is also suggested the name Rockall is from the Norse *rok, meaning 'foaming sea', and kollr, meaning 'bald head'—a word that appears in other place names in Scandinavian-speaking areas.

Legends around the seafaring Irish monk Brendan the Navigator state that he described Rockall in the sixth century.

Irish mythology giant Fionn mac Cumhaill (Finn McCool) allegedly scooped up a chunk of what is now Ulster to fling at a Scottish rival. It missed, instead landing in the Irish Sea to become the Isle of Man. The void left behind filled with water to become Lough Neagh. McCool is then alleged to have thrown a pebble that became what is now widely known as Rockall—alternatively, the pebble flew off north-west as he lifted the chunk of land or when it landed into the sea.

Rockall appears on a 1550 Portuguese chart as 'Rochol', and on one of 1606 as 'Rocol'. The map Nova Francia alio nomine dicta Terranova, anno 1504 (c. 1594), by Cornelis Claeszoon, Jan Doetecom, and Petrus Plancius, shows Rockall named Rookol.

Rockall is named Rokol in its first-known literary reference, Martin Martin's 1698-published A Late Voyage to St Kilda. The book states: "... and from it lies Rokol, a small rock sixty leagues [300 km] to the westward of St Kilda; the inhabitants of this place call it Rokabarra."

== Location ==
In 1956, British scientist James Fisher referred to Rockall as "the most isolated small rock ... in the oceans of the world". An all round navigational beacon was first installed on Rockall's summit in 1972. Rockall's location was precisely determined by Nick Hancock during his 2014 expedition.

Rockall's nearest land point is the uninhabited Soay, 301.3 kilometres (162.7 nmi) east in Scotland's St Kilda archipelago. Rockall's nearest inhabited area is Hirta, St. Kilda's largest island, 303.2 kilometres (163.7 nmi) east and populated intermittently at a single military base. Rockall's nearest permanently inhabited settlement is near Hogha Gearraidh crofting township, which is located 366.8 km (198.1 nmi) east of Rockall on North Uist's Aird an Rùnair headland, at Ordnance Survey grid reference NF 705 711 (57°36′33″N 7°31′7″W).

Rockall is 423.2 kilometres (263.0 statute miles; 228.5 nautical miles) north-west of Tory Island, County Donegal, Ireland. Rockall is also 700 kilometres (430 statute miles; 380 nautical miles) south of Iceland.

== History ==
=== Earliest mentions ===
What is now known as Rockall appears in Scots and Irish mythology (see "Etymology" section above). Rockall appears on maps from 1550 onward. The first-known literary reference to the islet is in Martin Martin's A Late Voyage to St. Kilda, published in 1698 (see "Etymology" section above).

=== Shipping disasters ===
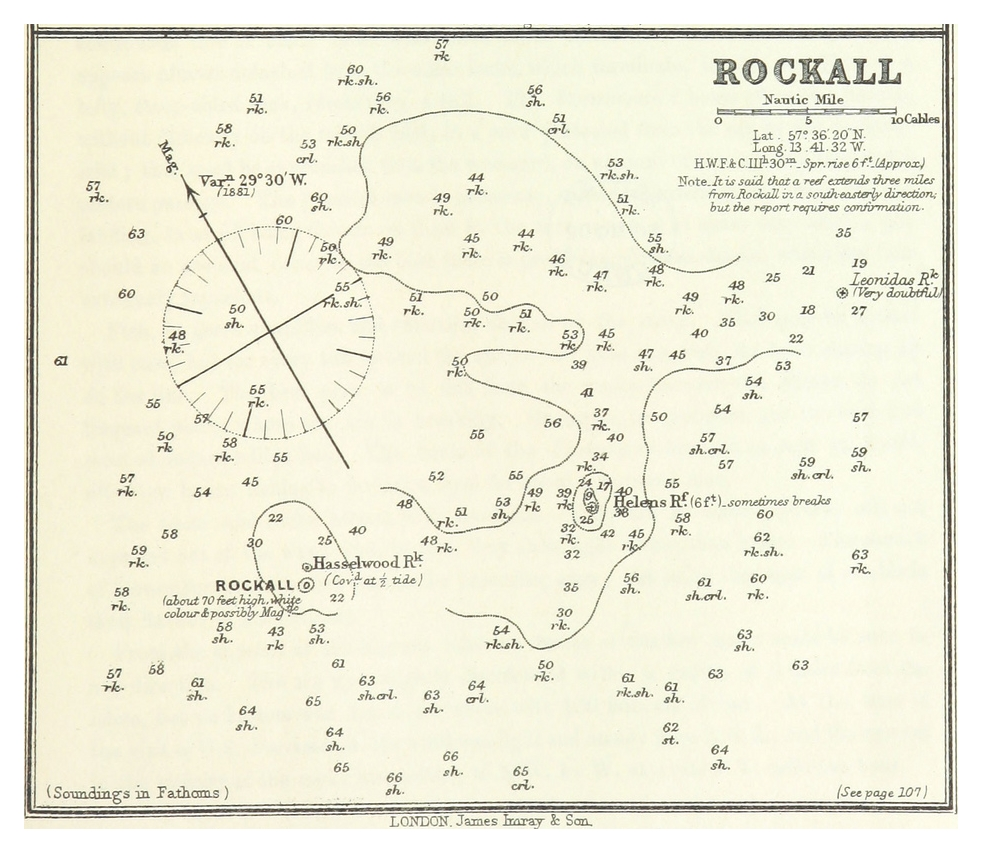
Rockall – Nautical chart – Atlantic Sea Pilot, 1884

There have been various disasters on the neighbouring Hasselwood Rock and Helen's Reef (the latter having been named in 1830).

- 1686 – a Spanish, French, or Spanish-French ship ran aground around Rockall. Several of the Spanish and French crew saved their lives by reaching St. Kilda in a pinnace. Some details of this event were recounted by Martin Martin in his A late voyage to St Kilda, published in 1698.
- 1824 – Brigantine Helen of Dundee, bound for Quebec, shipwrecked with fatalities, giving its name to what subsequently became known as Helen's Reef.
- 1839 – Charlotte of Hull wrecked on Rockall around Christmas
- 1904 – Danish ship SS Norge foundered on Hasselwood Rock in fog with the loss of more than 635 of its 750 passengers. The sinking remains the worst maritime disaster involving a Danish merchant ship, and was at the time the worst civilian disaster in the Atlantic Ocean—until the Titanic sank eight years later. The Norge sinking led to a proposal by D. & C. Stevenson for an unattended lightship to be moored close to the rock.

=== Recorded visits to Rockall ===
In 1971, Lord Kennet remarked, "There can be no place more desolate, despairing and awful."

The website for The Rockall Club as at July 2025 states, "Total authenticated Rockall landings to date: 146 individuals".

==== HMS Endymion – Rockall's first landing ====
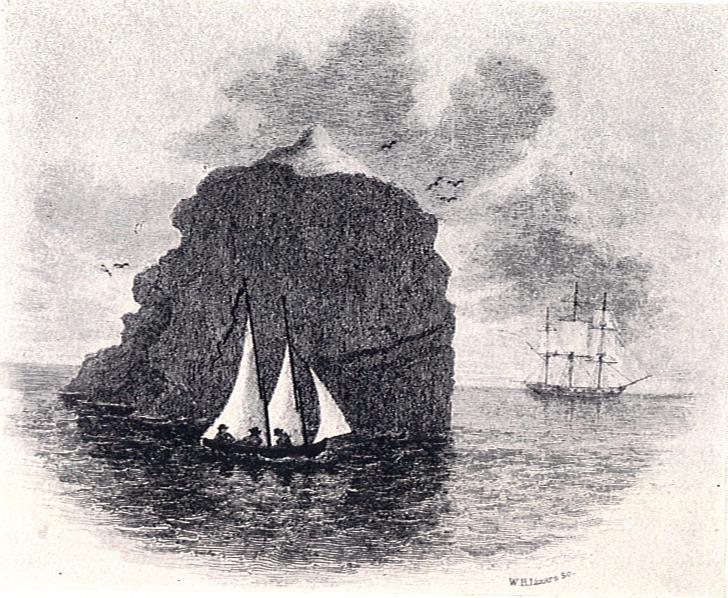
An illustration depicting HMS Endymion's landing party in their small boat at Rockall, with Endymion in the background

The earliest recorded landing on Rockall is often dated 8 July 1810. Royal Navy officer Basil Hall has been reported leading a small landing party from the frigate HMS Endymion to the summit. However, research by James Fisher (see "Location" section above), in the log of Endymion and elsewhere, reports the actual date for this first landing was Sunday 8 September 1811.

The landing party left Endymion for the rock by boat. Endymion, while taking depth measurements around Rockall, lost visual contact with the rock as a haze descended. The ship drifted away, stranding the landing party. The party attempted a return to the ship, but in the haze could not find Endymion, and soon gave up to return to Rockall.

The haze became a fog. The lookout sent to the top of Rockall re-spotted the ship, but it turned away from Rockall before the party in their boats reached it. Finally, just before sunset, Endymion was again spotted from the top of Rockall, and the party was able to re-board. The Endymion crew reported they had searched for five or six hours, firing their cannon every ten minutes. Hall related this and other adventures in his book Fragment of Voyages and Travels Including Anecdotes of a Naval Life.

==== 19th-century surveying and scientific visits ====
An engraving of Rockall from 1862

The exact position of Rockall and the size and shape of the Rockall Bank were first charted in 1831. This was by Captain A. T. E. Vidal, a Royal Navy surveyor. It is uncertain if this visit produced a landing.

In the summer of 1862, Mr Johns of HMS Porcupine landed on Rockall but did not reach the summit. This was whilst the ship was surveying the seabed prior to the laying of a transatlantic telegraph cable.

Miller Christy in 1896 led Rockall's first scientific expedition. The Royal Irish Academy chartered the Granuaile, and sponsored Christy's study of the flora and fauna. Two landing attempts were unsuccessful. Irish naturalist Robert Lloyd Praeger, who was on the trip, described it in his 1937 memoir The Way That I Went:

Eventually we put out a sea-anchor, and drifted to leeward all night, pitching and rolling. Next morning at 3.45 we were awakened by a cry of "Rockall at last". We rushed on deck in all sorts of costume or absence of costume. And there it was, half a mile to windward, a solitary speck of rock amid the wilderness of foam-flecked billows [..] All day we hung about the rock, coming at intervals as close as we dared [..] The sea roared about the rock, often enveloping it in foam two-thirds of the way up...

==== British annexation ====
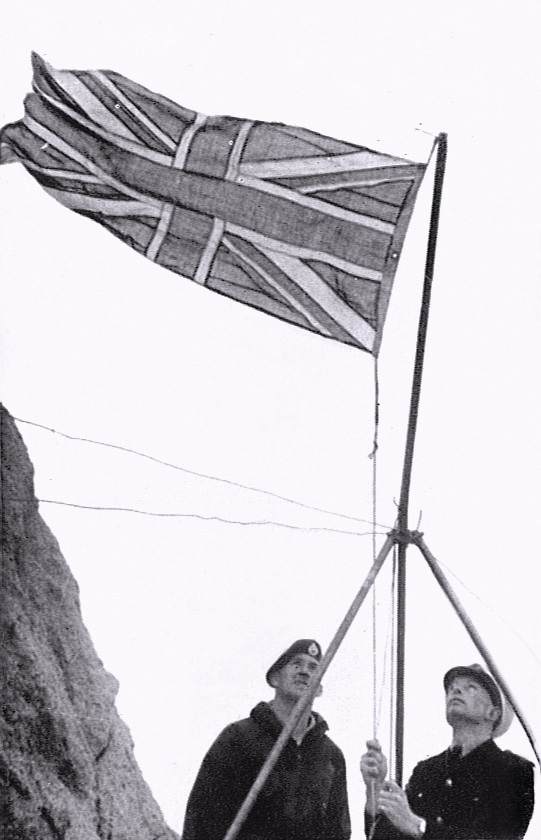
Lieutenant Commander Desmond Scott hoists the Union Flag in 1955

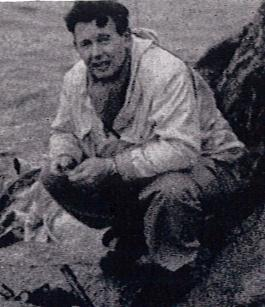
James Fisher at Rockall

The initial incentive for UK annexation of Rockall was the test-firing of the UK's first guided nuclear weapon, the American-made Corporal missile. The missile was to be launched over the North Atlantic from South Uist. The Ministry of Defence was concerned that the unclaimed Rockall could give the Soviet Union opportunity to spy on the test. Thus, in April 1955, the Admiralty was ordered to seize Rockall and declare UK sovereignty, lest it became a foreign observers' outpost.

On 18 September 1955, Rockall was annexed by the British Crown. To do so, four men were winched onto the islet by a Royal Navy helicopter from HMS Vidal (coincidentally named after the man who first charted the islet). The four were Lieutenant-Commander Desmond Scott RN, Sergeant Brian Peel RM, Corporal AA Fraser RM, and James Fisher (a civilian naturalist and former Royal Marine). The Admiralty announced the annexation on 21 September 1955. Fisher took rock samples for study by the British Geological Society.

The landing team cemented in a brass plaque on Hall's Ledge and hoisted the Union Flag to stake the UK's claim. The plaque inscription read:

BY AUTHORITY OF HER MAJESTY QUEEN ELIZABETH THE SECOND, BY THE GRACE OF GOD OF THE UNITED KINGDOM OF GREAT BRITAIN AND NORTHERN IRELAND AND OF HER OTHER REALMS AND TERRITORIES, QUEEN, HEAD OF THE COMMONWEALTH, DEFENDER OF THE FAITH, ETC. ETC. ETC. AND IN ACCORDANCE WITH HER MAJESTY'S INSTRUCTIONS DATED 14. 9. 55. A LANDING WAS EFFECTED ON THIS DAY UPON THE ISLAND OF ROCKALL FROM H.M.S. VIDAL. THE UNION FLAG WAS HOISTED AND POSSESSION OF THE ISLAND WAS TAKEN IN THE NAME OF HER MAJESTY. [Signed] R H Connell, CAPTAIN, H.M.S. VIDAL, 18 SEPTEMBER 1955

A geographic author in a wider study of 2012 opines Rockall was terra nullius (owned by no one), until this intended annexation. The Fleet Air Arm Officers' Association supports this view, stating "Rockall was the British Empire's final territorial expansion".

On 7 November 1955, J. Abrach Mackay, an 84-year-old local councilor and member of the Clan Mackay, protested the annexation; he declared: "My old father, God rest his soul, claimed that islet for the Clan of Mackay in 1846 and I now demand that the Admiralty hand it back. It's no' theirs." The British Government ignored his protest.

==== Deploying an all-round light beacon ====
In 1971, Captain T. R. Kirkpatrick RE led the landing party on a British government expedition named "Exercise Top Hat". Top Hat was mounted from RFA Engadine with two aims:

1. The principal aim of the exercise was to lay a flat surface on the top of Rockall so that an all-round visual light could be erected in future. This was achieved by blowing the top 5 feet (1.5 m) off Rockall, leaving a flat area of 12 by 5 feet (3.7 by 1.5 m).
2. A secondary aim was to deck qualify (Note: "Deck Landing Qualification—Landings performed on board ships for the purpose of qualifying pilots and aircrew members for shipboard operations.") one holdover pilot.

Both aims were achieved. The landing party included Royal Engineers, Royal Marines, and civilian members from the Institute of Geological Sciences in London. The party was landed by winch line from the Wessex 5 helicopters of the Royal Naval Air Services Commando Headquarters Squadron, commanded by Lt Cmdr Neil Foster RN.

As well as collecting samples of the aegirine granite, "rockallite", for later analysis in London, the top of the rock was blown off using a newly developed blasting technique, precision pre-splitting. This created a level area that was drilled to take the anchorages for the light beacon installed the following year. Two phosphor bronze plates were chased into the wall above Hall's Ledge, each secured by four 80-tonne rock-anchor bolts. UK authorities sent teams in 1973 on RFA Tidepool and in 1974 on HMS Tiger, to land on the rock to repair the navigational beacon. They also sent a team by Chinook helicopter to update the beacon in July 1982.

==== Tom McClean stays 40 days solo ====
Dublin-born adventurer and ex-SAS member Tom McClean lived on the islet from 26 May 1985 to 4 July 1985 to strengthen the British claim to the rock, living in a "wooden box". This solo visit set a new record stay of 40 days.

==== The first female landings – Sue Hiscock and Christine Howson ====
The second landing of 1988 was the Nature Conservancy Council landing from FPV Noma. Sue Hiscock at this point became the first woman to land on Rockall. Christine Howson in the same expedition became the second woman to land on Rockall. Hiscock's husband Eric also landed as part of this expedition.

==== Greenpeace visits and a 42-day record ====
Flag of the self-proclaimed "Global State of Waveland"

In 1997, three members of the environmentalist organisation Greenpeace occupied the islet for 42 days. Among the three was John Vidal, unrelated to Vidal mentioned in a previous visit.

The Greenpeace team called Rockall Waveland, to protest against oil exploration. Greenpeace declared the islet to be a "new Global State" (as a spoof micronation) and offered citizenship to anyone willing to take their pledge of allegiance. The British Government's response was to state that "Rockall is British territory. It is part of Scotland and anyone is free to go there and can stay as long as they please".

Vidal claimed that the Greenpeace team unscrewed the 1955 plaque and re-fixed it back to front. They also positioned a solar-powered beacon on the existing navigation aid frame.

Greenpeace returned for a second landing, this time in 1998 with eight people (three of whom stayed overnight). They upgraded the beacon. This light though succumbed to an Atlantic storm two years later. Greenpeace added their own plaque that read, "Let the sun and wind do their work. Leave the oil beneath the waves." Vidal stated in 2010, "I am told that the British plaque has now disappeared."

==== Radio hams ====
Rockall was the last of the unnumbered Islands On The Air (IOTA) in Europe. On 16 June 2005, the first amateur radio (ham radio) activation of Rockall took place. The club station MS0IRC/P was set up and operated on HF frequencies. The IOTA number EU-189 was issued to Rockall as a result of this activation. The nine person landing team, plus safety and radio equipment, was from Islands Radio Club Outer Hebrides. They included two radio operators, James Cameron and David Woods. The two worked with 262 stations in the three-and-a-half hours in which they broadcast. The team cut short their landing to nine hours due to incoming bad weather, unfulfilling their plan to stay overnight.

In 2011 a group of seven Belgian amateur radio operators travelled on CDT Fourcault to Rockall. Two of them, Patrick Godderie and Rudi Marleen, landed on the rock on 1 October to set up a radio station transmitting for 15 hours. They used HF frequencies under the call sign "MM0RAI/P". They stayed one night unsheltered on the islet.

==== Nick Hancock stays 45 days solo ====
On 31 May 2013, Chartered Surveyor and adventurer Nick Hancock from Edinburgh and a TV crew from BBC's The One Show sailed to the islet aboard Orca III. He planned to survive solo on Rockall for 60 days, raising money for Help for Heroes. He unsuccessfully attempted to land and survive on the islet. He had landed for the first time the previous year on a reconnaissance expedition coinciding with Queen Elizabeth II's Diamond Jubilee. The weather conditions at the time "were not favourable" according to a Maritime and Coastguard Agency official.

On 5 June 2014, Hancock landed on Rockall to begin his 60-day attempt. After losing supplies in a force-9 storm, he left Rockall after 45 days. He thus surpassed McClean's 40 day solo record by five days, and the 42-day record set by the Greenpeace group by three days.

==== Rigid inflatable boat landing ====
In 2016 Neil McGrigor led the first landing done by rigid inflatable boat (RIB). This group installed a new navigation beacon and used a drone to record a 60-second video featuring overhead views of Rockall.

==== Cam Cameron rescue after 30 days ====
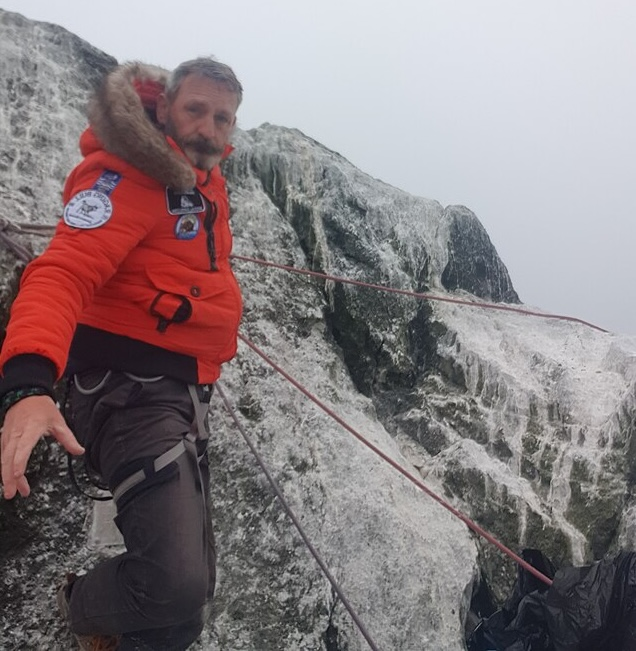
Cam Cameron on Rockall, 3 June 2023

In May 2023, Chris "Cam" Cameron from Buckie, a science teacher and former Gordon Highlander, began an attempt to stay 60 days on Rockall. He was raising funds for military charities. He was accompanied by a radio operator, Adrian Styles, and Bulgarian mountaineer Emil Bergmann. Styles and Bergmann planned to leave after a week. The group landed on Rockall on 30 May, having sailed from Inverkip on the Firth of Clyde. The attempt ended after 30 days when deteriorating weather conditions required Cameron's rescue by HM Coastguard.

=== Circumnavigations ===
The "Round Rockall" sailing race, sponsored by Galway Bay Sailing Club, runs from Galway, Ireland, around Rockall and back. It was held in 2012 to coincide with the finish of the 2011–12 Volvo Ocean Race around the world.

The 2015–2016 Clipper Round the World Yacht Race race 12 from New York to Derry was extended around Rockall despite previous promises to crew from Sir Robin Knox-Johnston that this would not happen again after the race to Danang. In July, 2022, the 2019–2020 Clipper Round the World Race (delayed for 2 years by COVID) was again extended on Leg 8 to go around Rockall before completing the leg at the mouth of the River Foyle in Ireland. The fleet had crossed the Atlantic in record time, and the City docks in Derry had no room for the fleet of 11 boats to berth. The race organisers sent the fleet around Rockall in order to extend the leg by approximately one day's sailing time to clear the docks in Derry.

In 2017, the Safehaven Marine team led by Frank Kowalski set a world record for the Long Way Round Circumnavigation of Ireland via Rockall. The Barracuda-style naval patrol, search, and rescue vessel Thunder Child completed the route in 34 hours, 1 minute, and 47 seconds. Set in an anti-clockwise direction, the new record – the first of its kind – is now subject to ratification by Irish Sailing and the Union Internationale Motonautique, the world governing board for all powerboat activity.

== Geography ==
=== Dimensions ===
Rockall rises sheer to a height of 17.15 m (56 ft 3 in). Rockall is about 25 metres (80 ft) wide and 31 m (102 ft) long at its base.

=== Hall's Ledge and other features ===
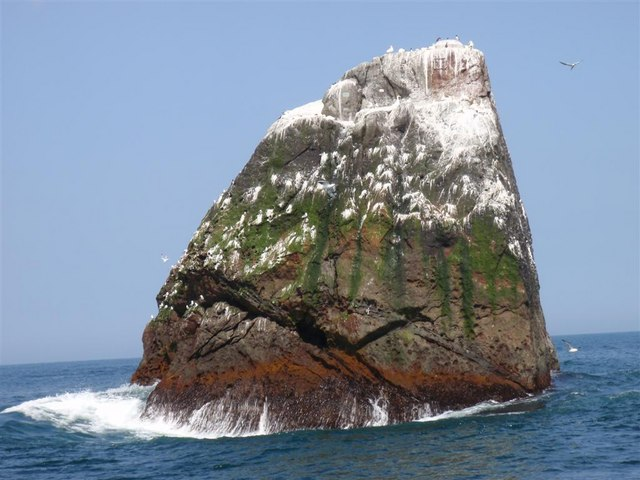
Rockall's south face, and north-facing side view of the east face cliff

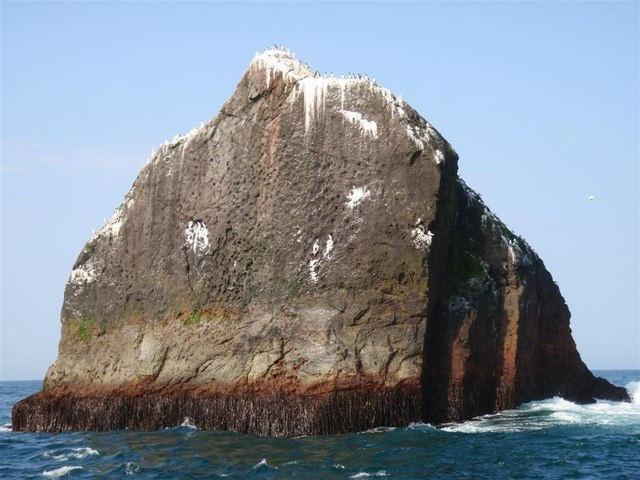
Diagonal view of the east face cliff

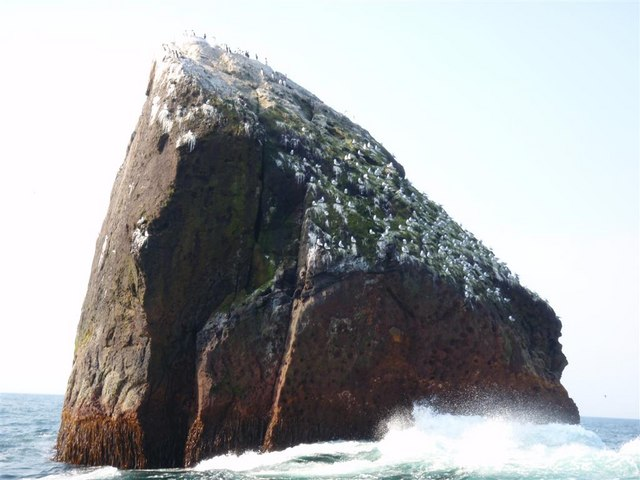
View from the north, showing side view of the east face cliff

Ocean swell hitting Rockall from the west was described by Nick Hancock as "exactly where you don't want it", for a successful landing attempt. A small step in the cliff on the western flank acts as a landing "platform". From there, anyone landing commences a fast, vertical scramble to safety out of the ocean swell zone. A traverse across the west face is then needed to reach the summit.

In 1971, Exercise Top Hat by the Corp of Royal Engineers blew the top 5 feet (1.5 m) off Rockall. That left a flat area of 12 feet by 5 feet at its longest and widest. This is the area cleared for an all-round navigation beacon (see #Deploying an all-round light beacon above).

Hall's Ledge on the south face is both Rockall's first-named location and only occupiable area. It was named in 1955 after Basil Hall, the first recorded person to land on Rockall (see "History" section above). The ledge measures just 3.5 by 1.3 m (11 ft 6 in by 4 ft 3 in) and is just 4 metres (13 ft) from Rockall's summit. William Dick in 1975 named a second feature on Rockall, Paul's Cave.

The British Geological Survey (BGS) reports that "a sill, 0.5 to 1.0 m thick and dipping at 30° to 35° to the east-north-east intrudes the lower part of the island," that, "on the south face, can be seen to bifurcate." The BGS add that Rockall is "cut by a series of joints, one set of which is responsible for the north–south orientation of the near-vertical east-facing cliff".

=== Helen's Reef and other surrounding features ===
Rockall is the largest of one of a few emergent elements of a large submarine plateau, the Rockall Bank, alongside the nearby Hasselwood Rock and Helen's Reef. Rockall Bank lies directly south of the Rockall Plateau. It is separated from the Outer Hebrides by the Rockall Trough, itself located within the Rockall Basin (also known as the Hatton Rockall Basin).

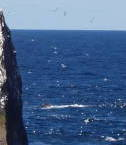
View north to Hasselwood Rock, visible as breaking waves 200 metres from Rockall

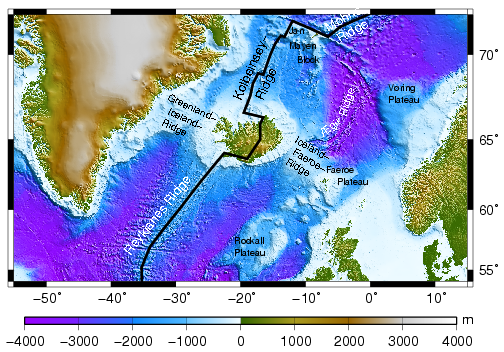
The Rockall Trough separating Ireland and Great Britain from the Rockall Plateau on which Rockall is situated

Hasselwood Rock, 200 metres north, and several other pinnacles of Helen's Reef, are smaller at half the size of Rockall or less. While similarly remote, those other formations are legally not islands nor points on land. That is because they are often submerged completely, only revealed momentarily above certain types of ocean surface waves.

=== Climate and weather ===
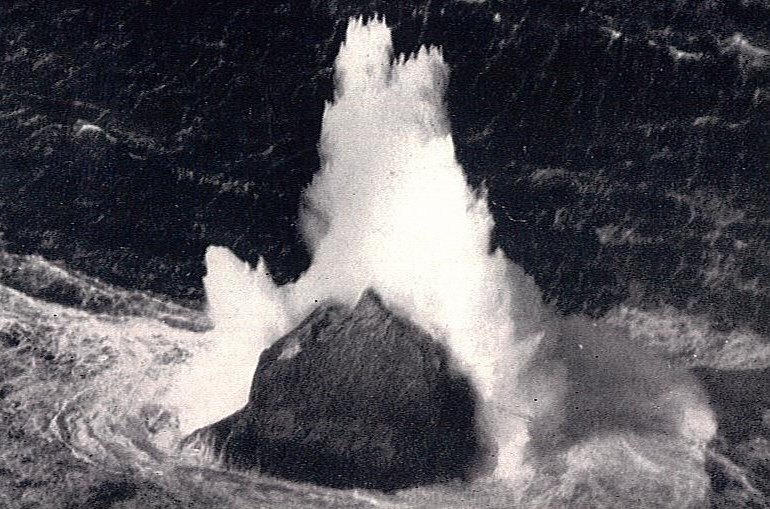
Large waves breaking over the islet on 11 March 1943, photographed by RAF Coastal Command

Although Rockall does not sustain a weather station, Rockall's isolated setting dictates an extremely oceanic climate without heat or cold extremes. The North Atlantic Current influences waters near Rockall.

Rockall's name has been given to one of the 31 sea areas named in the British Meteorological Office's shipping forecast since 1949. It was reported in 2006 that those onboard a British oceanographic research vessel just east of Rockall in February 2000 experienced the largest waves ever recorded by scientific instruments in the open ocean. A shipborne wave recorder measured individual waves up to 29.1 m (95 ft 6 in) from crest to trough, and a maximum significant wave height of 18.5 m (60 ft 8 in). Those measurements are higher than Rockall's 17.15 m (56 ft 3 in) summit.

== Geology ==
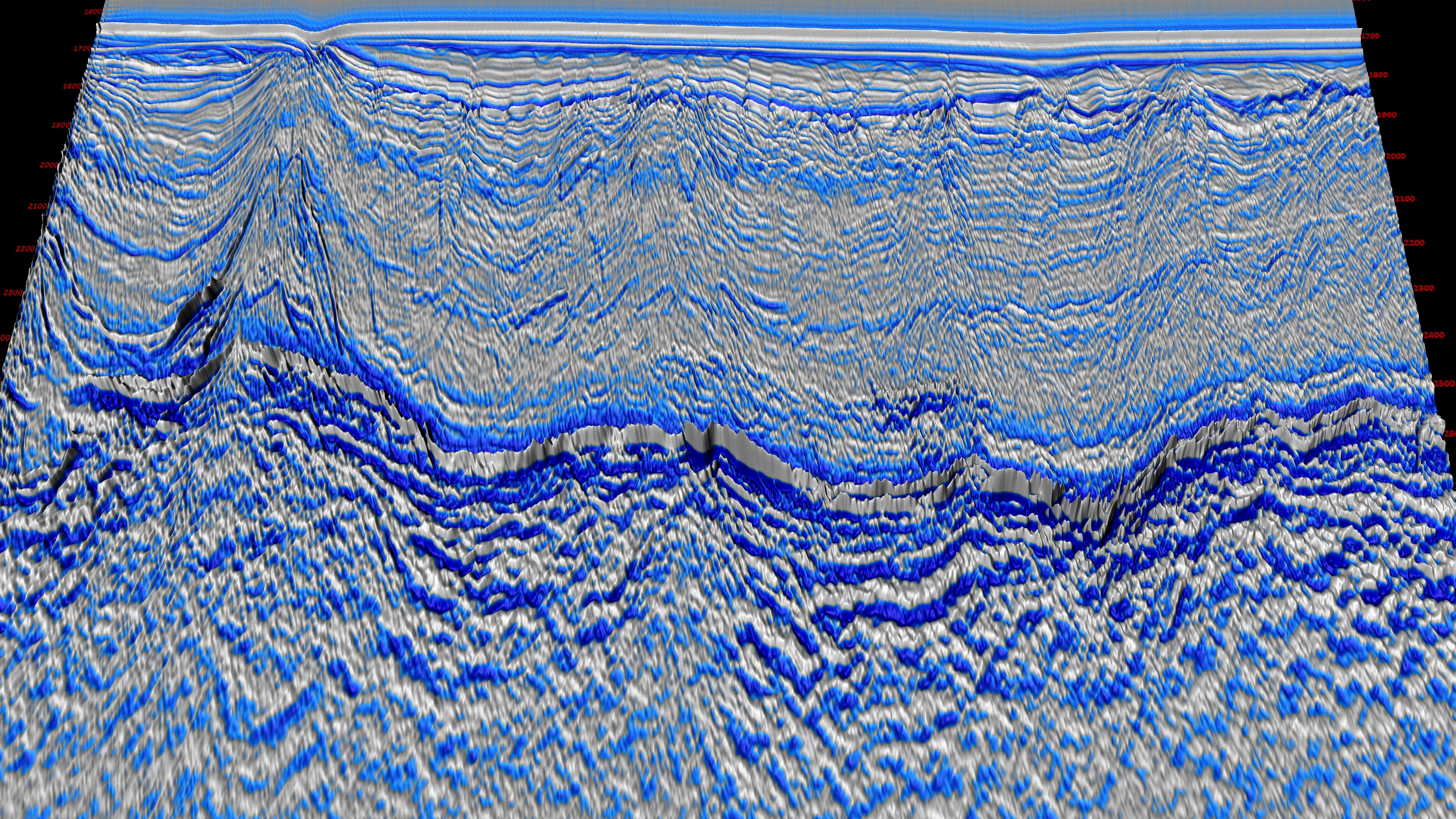
Seabed oil survey

Rockall is made of a type of peralkaline granite that is relatively rich in sodium and potassium. Within this granite are darker bands richer in iron because they contain two iron-sodium silicate minerals called aegirine and riebeckite. The darker bands are a type of granite that geologists have named "rockallite", although use of this term is now discouraged.

In 1975, a mineral new to science was discovered in a rock sample from Rockall. The mineral is called bazirite, named after the chemical elements barium and zirconium. Bazirite has the chemical formula of BaZrSi_{3}O_{9}.

Rockall forms part of the deeply eroded Rockall Igneous Centre that was formed as part of the North Atlantic Igneous Province. It was formed approximately 52±8 million years ago based on rubidium–strontium dating, as part of the breakup of Laurasia. Greenland and Europe separated and the north-east Atlantic Ocean was formed between them, eventually leaving Rockall as an isolated islet. The geological features of Rockall led to its designation as a Site of Special Scientific Interest.

The RV Celtic Explorer surveyed the Rockall Bank in 2003. The Irish light vessel Granuaile (the same name as the steamer on the RIA 1896 botany survey) was chartered by the Geological Survey of Ireland, on behalf of the Department of Communications, Marine and Natural Resources, to conduct a seismic survey of the Rockall Bank and the Hatton Bank in July 2004, as part of the Irish National Seabed Survey.

== Ecology ==
Rockall's only permanent multicellular inhabitants are common periwinkles and other marine molluscs. Small numbers of seabirds, mainly fulmars, northern gannets, black-legged kittiwakes, and common guillemots, use the rock for resting in summer. Gannets and guillemots occasionally breed successfully if the summer is calm with no storm waves washing over the rock. In total there have been just over twenty species of seabird and six other animal species observed (including the aforementioned molluscs) on or near the islet.

Cold-water coral biogenic reefs have been identified on the wider Rockall Bank, which are contributing features for the East Rockall Bank and North-West Rockall Bank SACs.

=== Discovery of new species ===
In December 2013, surveys by Marine Scotland discovered four new species of animal in the sea around Rockall. These are believed to live in an area where hydrocarbons are released from the seabed, known as a cold seep. The discovery has raised the issue of restricting some forms of fishery to protect the sea bed. The species are:

- Volutopsius scotiae – a sea snail about 10 cm (4 in) long
- Thyasira scotiae – a clam
- Isorropodon mackayi – a clam in the order Veneroida
- Antonbruunia sociabilis sp. – a marine worm in the order Phyllodocida

== Fishing ==
Possession of Rockall was for many decades deemed imperative to claims to the vast surrounding fisheries and oil-rich Atlantic seabed. The Irish Times claims to have reported on the economic value of Rockall's fisheries, as long ago as 1861. The waters around Rockall contain stocks of fish such as haddock, monkfish, squid, blue whiting, and megrim. In 2021, the Irish Seafood Sector Task Force stated that squid landings by Irish vessels from the seas around Rockall ranged from under 300 tonnes in 2016 to more than 1,000 tonnes in 2017 and 2019.

As of 2026, approximately 30 fishing vessels were landing fish from the waters around Rockall into the Scottish harbours of Kinlochbervie, Peterhead, Scrabster, and Ullapool. Historically, the waters were also fished by vessels from the Irish harbour of Killybegs. In 2024, the Irish South and West Fish Producers Organisation stated that the waters around Rockall had accounted for around 3% of the total fish it landed.

The Rockall haddock fishery was certified by the Marine Stewardship Council in 2018. In 2022, the certification was suspended after vessels were found to have entered protected areas with vulnerable marine ecosystems. The certification was reinstated in 2026 following the MSC being provided with enhanced access to vessel monitoring system data, strengthened fleet management practices, and improved self-reporting procedures.

== Ownership ==
=== 20th century ===
Exclusive economic zones of the UK, Ireland, Faroe Islands (Denmark) and Iceland around Rockall

Until 1955, Rockall was legally terra nullius. The UK claimed Rockall on 18 September 1955 when "Two Royal Marines and a civilian naturalist, led by Royal Navy officer Lieutenant Commander Desmond Scott, raised a Union flag on the islet and cemented a plaque into the rock". The landing was effected using a helicopter that took off from the survey ship HMS Vidal. NATO and Soviet submarines regularly patrolled the North Atlantic during this period. UK motivations behind the 1955 decision to claim Rockall as UK territory were revealed in documents subsequently declassified in May 2017: the UK Government had Cold War worries that Rockall could be used by "hostile agents" to spy on the future South Uist missile testing range, because it was within the radio-electrical range. The operation was known as Operation Rockall.

The British Island of Rockall Act 1972 (c. 2) formally annexed Rockall to the United Kingdom as part of the County of Inverness. The UK considers Rockall administratively part of the Isle of Harris.

In 1988, the UK and Ireland signed an exclusive economic zone (EEZ) boundary agreement ignoring the rock per the United Nations Convention on the Law of the Sea (UNCLOS). The agreement stated, "the location of Rockall was irrelevant to the determination of the boundary". Tánaiste Peter Barry opined Rockall as irrelevant when determining the boundaries of the EEZ, since the rock is uninhabitable. This bilateral agreement is disputed by Denmark (on behalf of the Faroes) and Iceland.

In 1994, two Scottish fishery inspectors were "kidnapped" by a Donegal vessel after they boarded it off Rockall. The ship's captain had been instructed to proceed to the nearest Scottish port for an alleged fishery offence. Instead he decided to steam for Killybegs with the two inspectors onboard. This caused a chase in the north Atlantic. After the Irish Department of Foreign Affairs intervened, the two officers were returned to their mother ship.

On 25 July 1997, the UK ratified UNCLOS, that states that "Rocks which cannot sustain human habitation or economic life of their own shall have no exclusive economic zone or continental shelf". This limits territorial sea claims to a 12-nautical-mile (22 km) radius, and therefore allows free passage in waters beyond this. The UK claims Rockall along with a 12 nautical mile-radius territorial sea around the islet inside the country's EEZ. The UK also claims "a circle of UK sovereign airspace" over Rockall. As the rock lies within the United Kingdom's EEZ, the UK claims sovereign rights for the purpose of exploring and exploiting, conserving and managing the natural resources of the area, including jurisdiction over the protection and preservation of the marine environment. The ratification of UNCLOS opened up fishing grounds around Rockall, leading to protests from the UK fishing workforce.

The Scottish Adjacent Waters Boundaries Order 1999 declared the area around Rockall to be under the jurisdiction of Scots law rather than English law.

=== 21st century ===
In 2011, Irish Tánaiste and Minister for Foreign Affairs and Trade, Eamon Gilmore, stated, "While Ireland has not recognised British sovereignty over Rockall, it has never sought to claim sovereignty for itself. The consistent position of successive Irish Governments has been that Rockall and similar rocks and skerries have no significance for establishing legal claims to mineral rights in the adjacent seabed and to fishing rights in the surrounding seas."

In March 2012, the UK Government Foreign and Commonwealth Office provided a response to a freedom of information request that stated that the UK's interpretation of UNCLOS was that Rockall was not entitled to an exclusive economic zone or continental shelf, but was entitled to a 12 nautical mile territorial sea, which merged with a 200 nautical mile Extended Fishery Zone, 200 nautical mile continental shelf, and other zones, along with sovereign airspace over Rockall. The response further noted that the UK, Denmark (on behalf of the Faeroe Islands), and Ireland had each submitted claims for extended continental shelves to the Commission on the Limits of the Continental Shelf concerning areas of the Rockall Bank and Hatton Rockall Plateau.

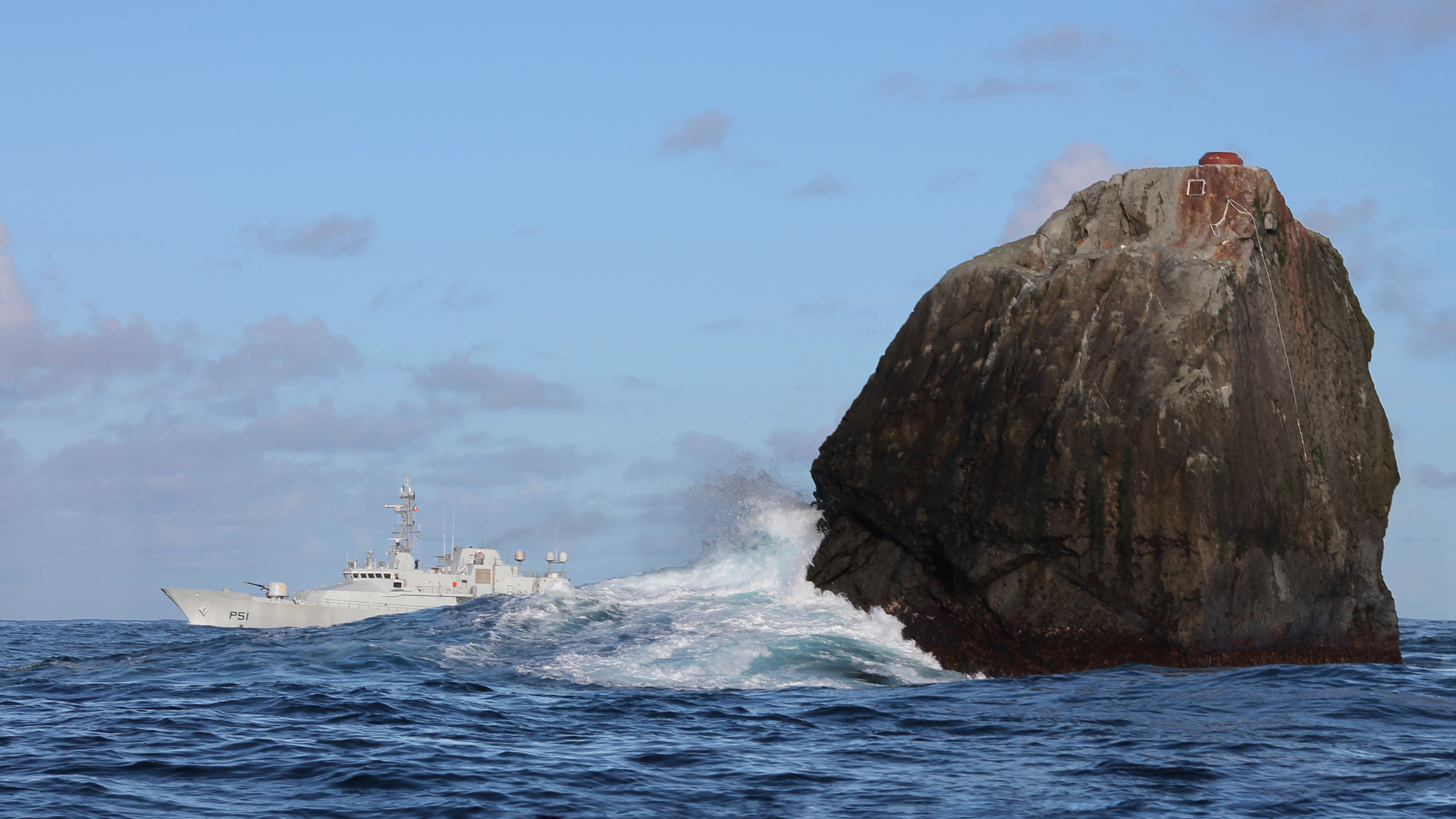
The Irish Naval Service vessel LÉ Róisín at Rockall, 12 October 2012

On 12 October 2012, Irish Naval Service ship LÉ Róisín was reported exercising a "showing the flag" patrol around the rock.

With effect from 31 March 2014, the UK and Ireland published EEZ limits which included Rockall within the UK's EEZ.

In 2017, the UK Government laid The Crown Estate Transfer Scheme 2017, a statutory instrument, which transferred ownership of Rockall to Crown Estate Scotland.

On 31 May 2019, the Scottish Government notified the Irish Government of intended enforcement action in respect to fishing around Rockall, which it described as "illegal activity". In June 2019, Scottish Government Cabinet Secretary for Rural Economy Fergus Ewing stated that Irish vessels could be boarded if they fished within 12 nautical miles of Rockall. A Scottish Government spokesperson stated, "Irish vessels, or any non-UK vessels for that matter, have never been allowed to fish in this way in the UK's territorial sea around Rockall" and "Should the illegal fishing continue, routine enforcement action will be implemented to protect our fisheries interests."

On 25 June 2019, Irish Minister for Foreign Affairs and Trade, Simon Coveney, supplemented the previous positions of Peter Barry and Eamon Gilmore by stating, "Rockall and similar rocks and skerries should have no significance for establishing legal claims to continental shelf. This position is now reflected in the 1982 United Nations Convention on the Law of the Sea which provides at Article 121, paragraph 3 that 'Rocks which cannot sustain human habitation or economic life of their own shall have no exclusive economic zone or continental shelf.'" He did so in the context of, "present difficulties between Ireland and Scotland over fishing within 12 miles of Rockall." Coveney ruled out dispatching Irish Naval Service vessels to Rockall. In the same month, Irish taoiseach Leo Varadkar stated "We don't have a claim on it. We don't accept any other sovereign claim on it".

In June 2019, the European Commission stated "the question of sovereignty over Rockall is a matter of international law" and that "According to EU law, there is equal access to Union waters and resources and, in the absence of authorised restrictions, any fishing vessels having an EU quota can legally fish around Rockall."

Following the UK leaving the EU on 31 January 2020, the EU–UK Trade and Cooperation Agreement came into force on 1 January 2021. Three days later, the Northern Celt, an Irish fishing boat based out of Greencastle, County Donegal, was boarded and ordered to leave the 12 nautical mile zone around Rockall by officers of a Marine Scotland patrol boat.

Since 2021, fishing licences issued by the UK to EU vessels have excluded access to the 12 nautical mile zone around Rockall. In 2023, Irish Minister for Agriculture, Food and the Marine, Charlie McConalogue stated that this action was costing the Irish fishing industry up to €7 million per year.

In 2024, a proposed bilateral agreement between the governments of Ireland and Scotland would have allowed Irish fishing vessels to return to the 12 nautical mile zone. The proposal was vetoed by the UK's Foreign Secretary, David Cameron.

In 2025, Irish Minister of State with responsibility for the marine, Timmy Dooley, stated that negotiations were ongoing with the UK Government around reinstating Irish fishermen's access to fishing waters at Rockall. Dooley stated that "Ireland has not sought to claim sovereignty over Rockall" and that Ireland's position was that "a rock incapable of sustaining human habitation does not allow for the creation of a territorial sea".

== In popular culture ==
- English poet Michael Roberts published a poem "Rockall" in his 1939 collection, Orion Marches. The poem describes a shipwrecked traveller on the rock.
- In the 1951 novel The Cruel Sea by Nicholas Monsarrat, Rockall features as the place of the final act of HMS Saltash's war. It is here the ship takes the surrender of two German U-boats on the last day of World War Two in Europe.
- The 1955 British landing, complete with the trappings such as hoisting the flag, caused a certain amount of popular amusement, with some seeing it as a sort of farcical end to imperial expansion. The satirists Flanders and Swann sang a successful piece entitled "Rockall", playing on the similarity of the word to the vulgar expression 'fuck all', meaning 'nothing': "The fleet set sail for Rockall, Rockall, Rockall, To free the isle of Rockall, From fear of foreign foe. We sped across the planet, To find this lump of granite, One rather startled gannet; In fact, we found Rockall."
- In The Goon Show episode "Napoleon's Piano" (first broadcast October 1955), Bluebottle lands on the piano as it is floating in the English Channel and cements a brass plate to it in the belief that it is Rockall. Rockall was the launching site for the prototype "Jet-propelled guided NAAFI" in the Goon Show episode of the same name (January 1956). In the episode "The Sale of Manhattan" (November 1955) the legal team of Bannister and Crun (Seagoon's lawyers) were "said to be the finest lawyers in Rockall."
- It has been suggested by several critics that Rockall is the rock that forms the setting for William Golding's 1956 novel Pincher Martin.
- The Master, a 1957 novel by T. H. White, is set inside Rockall.
- David Frost, when hosting the 1962–1963 BBC satirical TV programme That Was the Week That Was, recited a list of the dwindling British colonial possessions, ending with the words, "... and sweet Rockall."
- Storm Over Rockall was a 1965 novel by W. Howard Baker, part of a series of novels based on the espionage television series Danger Man.
- "Ether", the opening track of the English post-punk band Gang of Four's 1979 debut album, Entertainment!, features the satirical line 'There may be oil under Rockall'. The bulk of the song deals with the then-ongoing Troubles in Northern Ireland and is critical of British actions there; the line alludes anticlimactically to the dispute between Ireland and the UK over Rockall.
- The Icelandic instrumental jazz-funk fusion band Mezzoforte's track Rockall was a minor hit in Europe in 1983 and was used as a signature tune by several European radio chart shows.
- The Irish folk group The Wolfe Tones made Rockall the subject of their 1976 song "Rock on, Rockall", which asserted an Irish claim to the rock.
- A club, The Rockall Club, has been established for people who have landed there.
- In series 2, episode 2, of the television series The Ambassador, "Vacant Possession" (first broadcast on 25 April 1999), an Irish protester lands on Rockall and claims it for his nation, sparking a diplomatic row.
- In 2000 BBC Choice broadcast two series of a topical panel show titled Good Evening Rockall in which panellists put forward events to be included in a news bulletin ostensibly targeting the rock. Sue Perkins hosted the second series.
- The duo and solo project of Runrig songwriters Calum and Rory MacDonald is called The Band from Rockall.

== See also ==
- List of islands of Scotland
- List of outlying islands of Scotland
- Seán Dublin Bay Rockall Loftus – Irish environmentalist, barrister, and politician (1927–2010)
- Okinotori
