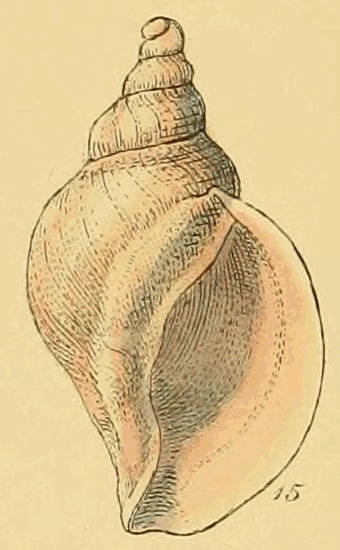
- Volutopsius norwegicus shell

Scientific classification
- Kingdom: Animalia
- Phylum: Mollusca
- Class: Gastropoda
- Subclass: Caenogastropoda
- Order: Neogastropoda
- Family: Buccinidae
- Genus: Volutopsius; Mörch, 1857

= Volutopsius =

Genus of gastropods

Volutopsius is a genus of sea snails, marine gastropod mollusks in the family Buccinidae, the true whelks.

== Species ==
Species within the genus Volutopsius include:

- Volutopsius castaneus
- Volutopsius deformis (Reeve, 1847)
- Volutopsius norwegicus (Gmelin, 1791)
- Volutopsius scotiae (Fraussen, McKay & Drewery, 2013)
