= Alexander Thomas Emeric Vidal =

Vice-Admiral Alexander Thomas Emeric Vidal
- Born: 1792
- Died: April 5, 1863 (aged 70–71); Clifton, Bristol
- Military career
- Allegiance: United Kingdom of Great Britain and Ireland
- Branch: Royal Navy
- Service years: 1803–1863
- Rank: Vice-Admiral
- Commands: HMS Barracouta; HMS Aetna; HMS Styx; HMY William & Mary

Alexander Thomas Emeric Vidal (1792 – 5 February 1863) was an officer of the Royal Navy. He became an accomplished surveyor, and reached the rank of vice-admiral.

== Early life ==
Vidal was born in 1792, the youngest of four children of Emeric Vidal, who served in the Royal Navy. Alexander followed his father, embarking on a naval career in December 1803 when he joined HMS Illustrious as a 1st class volunteer. He served alternately under Sir Charles Hamilton, Michael Seymour and W. Shield. He initially served in the English Channel, off the north coast of Spain and in the West Indies, until November 1805. He later joined the Royal Naval College at Portsmouth, before joining Lavinia in November 1809. Here he served under Lord William Stuart, and George Digby. He spent three years aboard the Lavinia at the rank of midshipman, and saw service in the Mediterranean and West Indies, and at Cádiz and Lisbon.

== Promotion ==
He then served on the Home Station, successively aboard HMS Salvador del Mundo, HMS Niobe, HMS Cornwall, HMS Namur, HMS Bann and HMS Conway. He sailed aboard the Conway to the North American Station, and on arrival, spent time on the Great Lakes working in a surveying role. He was briefly employed as flag-lieutenant to Commodore Sir Edward Owen, before receiving his commission, dated February 1815. He was appointed to HMS Leven in August 1818, rising to the post of first lieutenant under William Owen. The death of Commander Cudlip led to Vidal being appointed to his first command, that of HMS Barracouta, and in May 1823 he was confirmed with promotion to the rank of Commander. He accompanied Owen on his voyage to Africa and on his return to England in October 1825, he was promoted to post-captain.

== Hunt for Aitkin's Rock ==
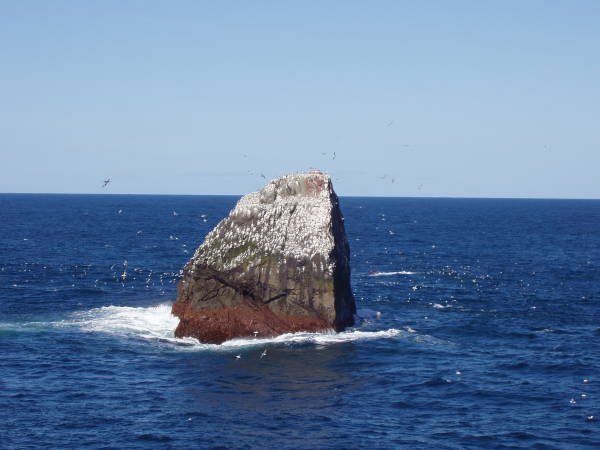
Rockall, first surveyed by Vidal in 1831

Aitkin's Rock was a supposed rock in the North Atlantic. Despite being observed and named by a merchant, it had not been reliably charted, and expeditions, by HMS Gannet in 1824; HMS Harrier and HMS Badger in 1827; and HMS Pylades and HMS Dispatch had all failed to locate it. In the summer of 1830, the Admiralty placed Vidal in command of HMS Onyx and HMS Leveret and ordered him to investigate. There had been at least seven separate reports of the potential hazard, said to be small and protruding only about four feet from the water. Francis Beaufort worked out a rough position for the rock and Vidal set out to investigate. He spent six weeks charting the supposed locations and all of the positions in between, without discovering any evidence. Satisfied that the rock was a mere vigia, he returned to port. During his surveys in search of the rock, he discovered and charted Vidal bank, and the next year became the first to accurately chart and describe Rockall.

== African mapping ==
Vidal sailed aboard HMS Aetna in December 1835, carrying 12 chronometers. He intended to calculate the meridian arc length to the Cape Verde Islands, and the west coast of Africa. He eventually carried out detailed surveys all along the African coast, so that by 1838 the Secretary of the Royal Geographical Society could remark of the survey that

This tedious undertaking is drawing to a close, and will then be of equal utility to the fair traders and the anti-slavery cruisers. It is fortunately in the hands of such a man as Captain Vidal, R.N., who has steadily devoted himself during a long period of ill-health, to complete this unpopular work, and to connect with it a minute examination of the Canary Islands.

Vidal then carried out surveys of the Azores aboard HMS Styx from September 1841 until January 1845. He then moved aboard the yacht William & Mary to complete the work.

== Later life and legacy ==
Vidal was promoted to rear-admiral on 27 January 1851, and vice-admiral on 17 June 1859. He had married Sarah Antoinette, daughter of Henry Veitch, the Consul General of Madeira, in October 1839 and had two sons, Owen Alexander (b. 1841) and Beaufort Henry (b. 1842). Following his wife's death in 1843, Vidal emigrated to Canada, where he joined his eldest brother Richard Emeric Vidal in the founding of Sarnia, Ontario. He died at Clifton, Bristol on 5 February 1863, aged 73.

The survey ship HMS Vidal, launched in 1951, was named in his honour. In 1955 a party from HMS Vidal were landed on Rockall to claim it as part of the United Kingdom, thus claiming the islet that Alexander Vidal had first surveyed over a hundred years before.

== See also ==
- O'Byrne, William Richard (1849). "Vidal, Alexander Thomas Emeric" . A Naval Biographical Dictionary . John Murray – via Wikisource.
