= Island of Rockall Act 1972 =

Act of the Parliament of the United Kingdom

Island of Rockall Act 1972 (Note: Section 2.)
- Act of Parliament
- Parliament of the United Kingdom
- Long title: An Act to make provision for the incorporation of that part of Her Majesty's Dominions known as the Island of Rockall into that part of the United Kingdom known as Scotland, and for purposes connected therewith.
- Citation: 1972 c. 2
- Territorial extent: United Kingdom

Dates
- Royal assent: 10 February 1972
- Commencement: 10 February 1972 (Note: The Acts of Parliament (Commencement) Act 1793.)
Other legislation
Amended by	Local Government (Scotland) Act 1973

Status: Amended

Text of statute as originally enacted

Revised text of statute as amended

Text of the Island of Rockall Act 1972 as in force today (including any amendments) within the United Kingdom, from legislation.gov.uk.

The Island of Rockall Act 1972 (c. 2) is an act of the Parliament of the United Kingdom formally incorporating the island of Rockall into the United Kingdom to protect it from Irish and Icelandic claims. The act as originally passed declared that the Island of Rockall was now part of the Scottish county of Inverness-shire (it is now in the Western Isles).

The act has a single effective section, which, as originally enacted, read:

As from the date of the passing of this Act, the Island of Rockall (of which possession was formally taken in the name of Her Majesty on 18 September 1955 in pursuance of a Royal Warrant dated 14 September 1955 addressed to the Captain of Her Majesty's Ship Vidal) shall be incorporated into that part of the United Kingdom known as Scotland and shall form part of the District of Harris in the County of Inverness, and the law of Scotland shall apply accordingly.

It was amended by section 214(2) of, and paragraph 202 of schedule 27 to, the Local Government (Scotland) Act 1973 (c. 65) to transfer administrative control to the Western Isles Council when Inverness-shire was abolished.
