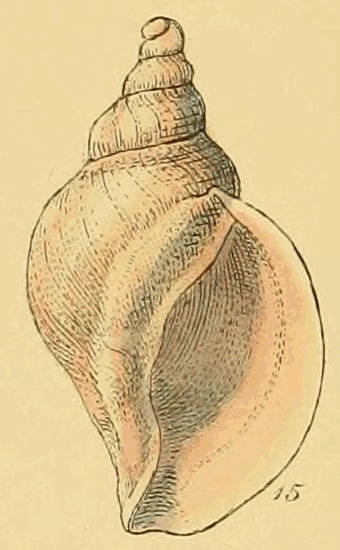
- Volutopsius norwegicus shell

Scientific classification
- Kingdom: Animalia
- Phylum: Mollusca
- Class: Gastropoda
- Subclass: Caenogastropoda
- Order: Neogastropoda
- Family: Buccinidae
- Genus: Volutopsius
- Species: V. norwegicus

Binomial name
- Volutopsius norwegicus (Gmelin, 1791)

Synonyms
- Strombus norwegicus Gmelin, 1791; Volutopsius norvegicus (Gmelin, 1791); Fusus largillierti Petit de la Saussaye, 1851; Volutopsius norwegicus var. dautzenbergi Schlesch, 1929

= Volutopsius norwegicus =

Species of gastropod

Volutopsius norwegicus is a species of sea snail, a marine gastropod mollusk in the family Buccinidae, the true whelks.
