= Francis Leslie Ashton =

English writer (1904–1994)

- Born: 24 June 1904; Chapel en le Frith, Derbyshire, England
- Died: July 1994 (aged 90); Ely, Cambridgeshire, England

Francis Leslie Ashton (24 June 1904 – July 1994) was an English writer known for his first novel Breaking of the Seals in 1946 and a kind of sequel Alas, That Great City from 1948. The two novels concern disasters involving objects orbiting the Earth in prehistoric times. In 1952 he co-wrote Wrong Side of the Moon with his brother Stephen, which concerns space travel.

== Personal life ==
- Francis Leslie Ashton was born on 24 June 1904 in Chapel-en-le-Frith, Derbyshire to Mary Alice and William Ashton. Ashton had two siblings, Elizabeth Bruce (1902–1994) and Stephen Thurstan Ashton (1907–1991).
- Ashton died in Ely, Cambridgeshire in July 1994 aged 90 years.
