= HMS Vidal =

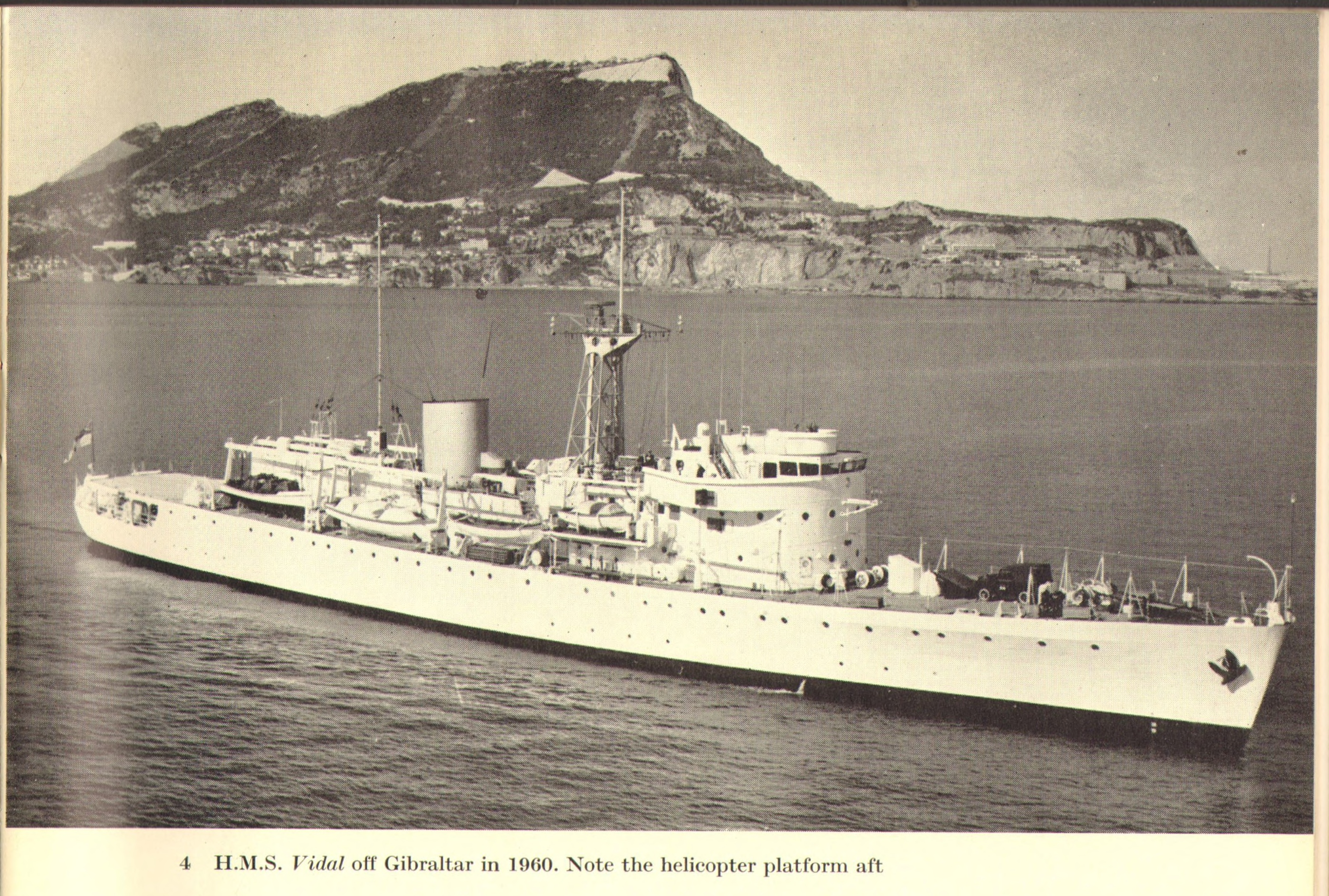

History

United Kingdom
- Name: HMS Vidal
- Builder: Chatham Dockyard
- Laid down: 5 July 1950
- Launched: 31 July 1951
- Completed: 29 March 1954
- Commissioned: 1954
- Fate: Broken up in June 1976

General characteristics
- Class & type: Survey ship
- Displacement: 1,885 long tons full load
- Length: 297 ft (91 m)
- Beam: 40 ft (12 m)
- Propulsion: Four diesel motors; two shafts
- Speed: 16 knots
- Complement: 161
- Armament: 4 × 3pdr saluting guns; depth charges
- Aircraft carried: 1 × Westland Dragonfly helicopter

HMS Vidal was a survey ship of the Royal Navy. She was designed specifically as a surveying vessel, and was the first survey ship to carry a helicopter. In 1955, a group from Vidal formally annexed Rockall in the North Sea to the United Kingdom.

== Construction and naming ==
Vidal was built at Chatham Dockyard, and was the last surface vessel built at the Dockyard. She was also the first survey ship designed to carry a helicopter. Vidal was laid down on 5 July 1950, was launched on 31 July 1951 and completed on 29 March 1954 at a cost of £1,345,000. In common with most of the survey ships of the period, she was named after an influential surveyor or explorer of the Royal Navy. In her case, this was the nineteenth century surveyor Alexander Thomas Emeric Vidal, who had surveyed much of the coast of Africa, and ranged into the Atlantic to survey the tiny islet of Rockall. So far she has been the only ship of the Navy to bear the name.

Vidal was 315 feet (96 m) long overall and 297 feet (91 m) between perpendiculars, with a beam of 40 feet (12 m) and a draught of 13 feet (4.0 m). The ship was designed to displace 1,565 long tons (1,590 t) standard and 1,885 long tons (1,915 t) full load, but was heavier as built, with a standard displacement of 1,940 long tons (1,970 t) standard and 2,200 long tons (2,200 t) full load. She was powered by four Admiralty Standard Range (ASR-1) Diesel engines, giving a total of 2,940 shaft horsepower (2,190 kW) and driving two shafts, giving a speed of 15.9 knots (18.3 mph; 29.4 km/h). The ship was air conditioned to ease operations in extreme temperatures, and was the first Royal Navy ship built with cafeteria messing. Helicopters operated included the Hiller HT.1, the Westland Dragonfly and the Westland Wasp.

The ship was armed with four 3-pounder (47 mm) saluting guns, and could carry depth charges. She had a crew of 161.

== Career ==
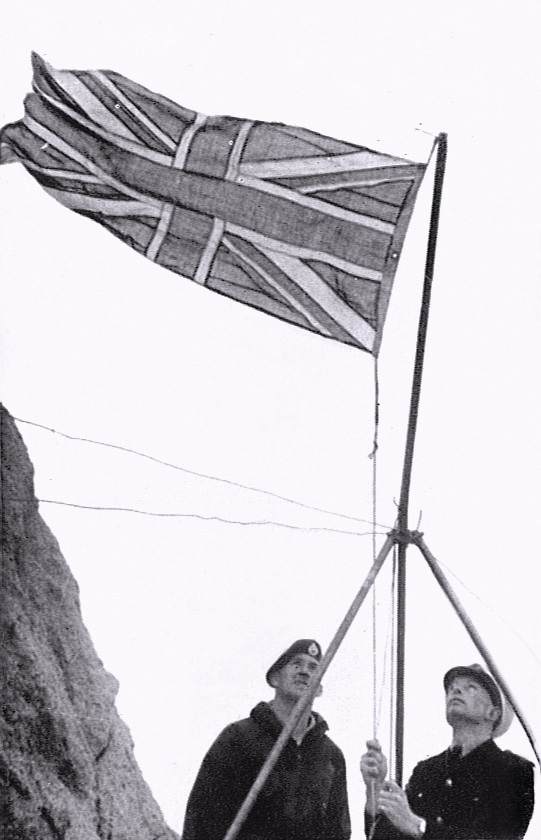
A party from HMS Vidal hoist the Union Flag over Rockall in 1955

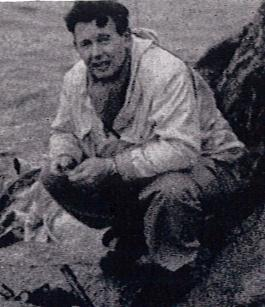
James Fisher on the 1955 Rockall expedition

Vidal spent her career carrying out surveys for the Navy, and supporting scientific work for the British government. The development of the Cold War led the British government to decide to formally annex Rockall. This was authorised on 14 September 1955, with orders from Queen Elizabeth II transmitted to the Vidal detailing

On arrival at Rockall you will effect a landing and hoist the Union flag on whatever spot appears most suitable or practicable and you will then take possession of the island on our behalf.

The Vidal arrived in position the following day, but were unable to land any men as poor weather prevented the helicopter from flying.

On 18 September 1955 at precisely 10.16 am, Lieutenant-Commander Desmond Scott RN, Sergeant Brian Peel RM, Corporal AA Fraser RM, and James Fisher (a civilian naturalist and former Royal Marine), were deposited on the island by a Royal Navy helicopter from HMS Vidal. The team cemented in a brass plaque on Hall's Ledge and hoisted the Union Flag to stake the UK's claim.

The inscription on the plaque read:

By authority of Her Majesty Queen Elizabeth II, by the Grace of God of the United Kingdom of Great Britain and Northern Ireland and of her other realms and territories Queen, Head of the Commonwealth, Defender of the Faith, and in accordance with Her Majesty's instructions dated the 14th day of September, 1955, a landing was effected this day upon this island of Rockall from HMS Vidal. The Union flag was hoisted and possession of the island was taken in the name of Her Majesty. [Signed] R H Connell, Captain, HMS Vidal, 18 September 1955.

The plaque was still in place in 1997, but was found missing after the rock was visited by Greenpeace protesters.

The formal annexation of Rockall was announced by the Admiralty on 21 September 1955.

In 1964 Vidal carried the Chief Hydrographer, Admiral Sir Edmund Irving to Leningrad for talks with Admiral Anatoliy Rassokho, his counterpart in the Soviet Union. In 1967 she transported scientists and personnel to Aldabra Atoll[Circular SZR/7/67 of The Royal Society] ? and Diego Garcia.

The Vidal was broken up in Bruges in June 1976.
