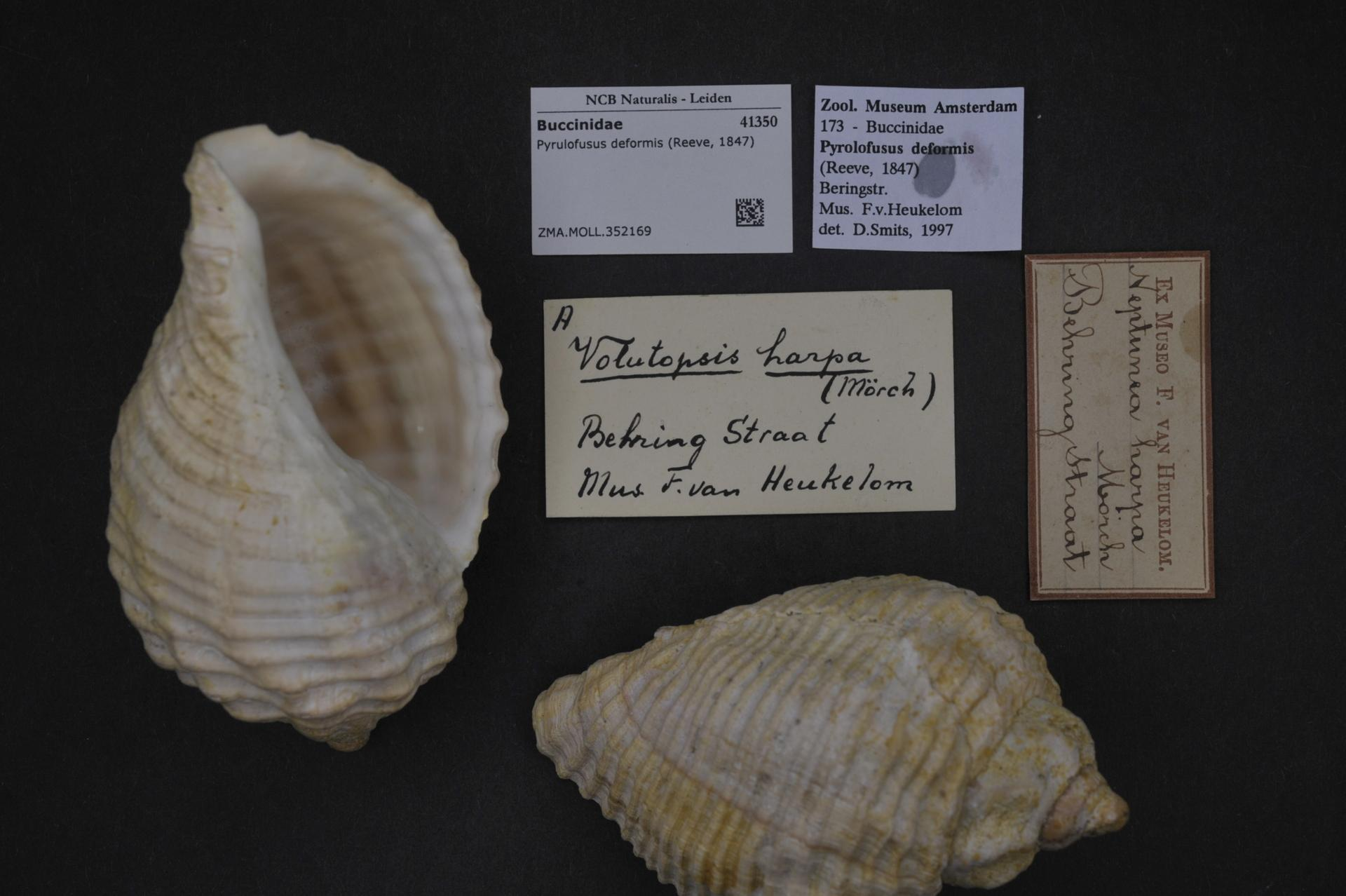

Scientific classification
- Kingdom: Animalia
- Phylum: Mollusca
- Class: Gastropoda
- Subclass: Caenogastropoda
- Order: Neogastropoda
- Family: Buccinidae
- Genus: Pyrulofusus
- Species: P. deformis

Binomial name
- Pyrulofusus deformis (Reeve, 1847)

Synonyms
- Volutopsius deformis (Reeve, 1847)

= Pyrulofusus deformis =

Species of gastropod

Pyrulofusus deformis, common name the warped whelk, is a species of sea snail, a marine gastropod mollusk in the family Buccinidae, the true whelks.

== Description ==
This species attains a size of 170 mm.

== Distribution ==
It can be spotted in the Arctic region.
