= Roy MacNairy =

English cricketer

Roy MacNairy (11 February 1904 – 5 September 1962) was an English cricketer active from 1924 to 1926 who played for Lancashire. He was born in Barrow-in-Furness and died in Huddersfield. He appeared in one first-class match, scoring four runs with a highest score of 4* and took one wickets with a best analysis of one for 23. Details of his batting who bowling styles are unrecorded.
