= SS Norge =

Danish passenger liner (1881–1904)

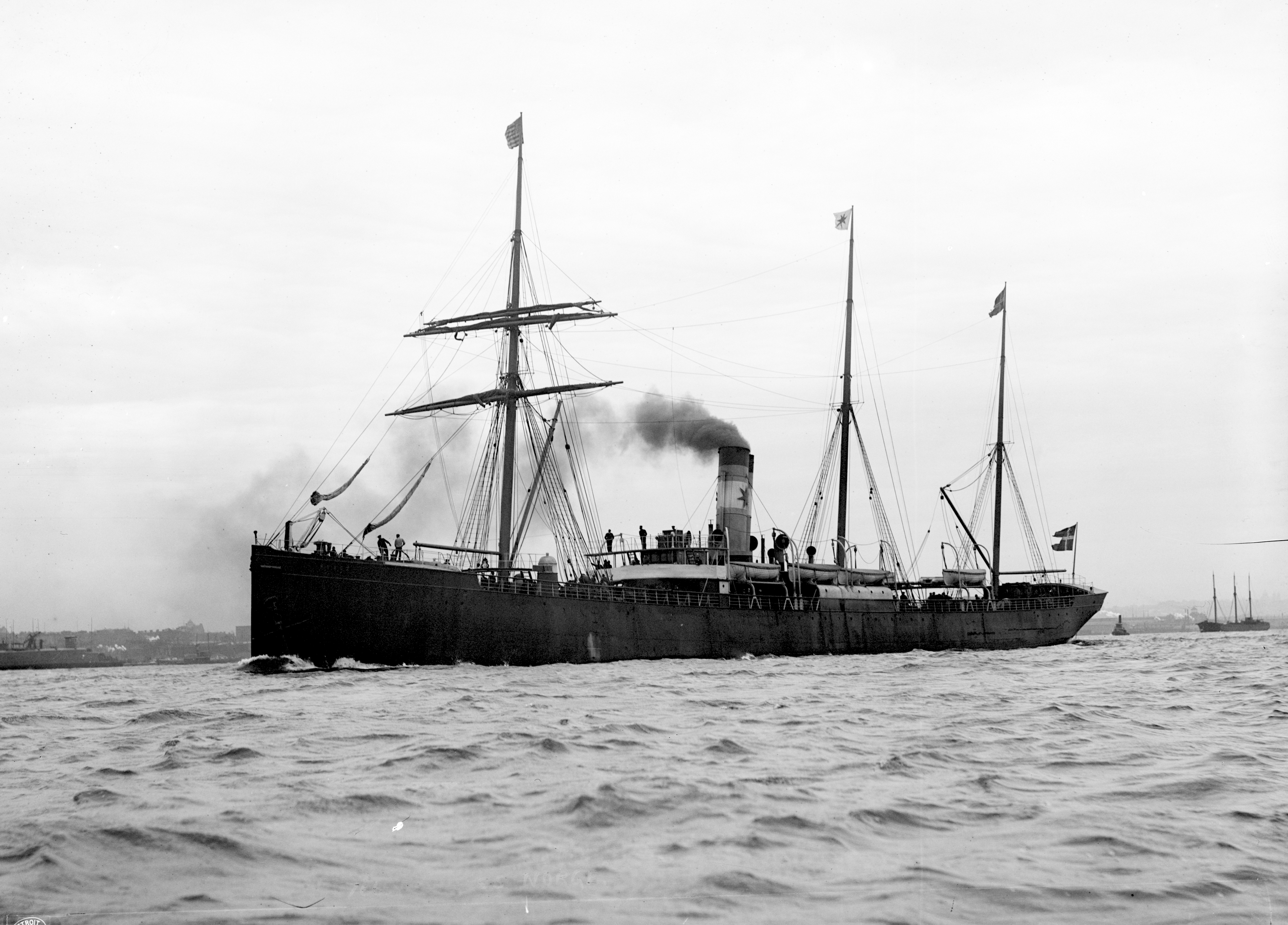
- Norge

History
- Name: 1881: Pieter de Coninck; 1889: Norge
- Namesake: 1881: Pieter de Coninck; 1889: Scandinavian word for Norway
- Owner: 1881: Theodore C. Engels & Co; 1889: A/S D/S Thingvalla; 1898: Det Forenede D/S
- Port of registry: 1881: (Belgium) Antwerp; 1889: (Denmark) Copenhagen
- Builder: Alexander Stephen & Sons, Linthouse
- Yard number: 252
- Launched: 11 June 1881
- Fate: Grounded and sank on 28 June 1904 57.5967°N 13.6887°W

General characteristics
- Class & type: passenger steamship
- Tonnage: 3,310 GRT, 2,445 NRT
- Length: 346.5 ft (105.6 m)
- Beam: 38.2 ft (11.6 m)
- Depth: 32.7 ft (10.0 m)
- Installed power: 1,400 ihp
- Propulsion: triple-expansion steam engine
- Speed: 10 kn (19 km/h)
- Capacity: 800 passengers

SS Norge was a transatlantic ocean liner that was launched in 1881 in Scotland, and was lost in 1904 off Rockall with great loss of life. Her final voyage was from Copenhagen, Kristiania and Kristiansand, bound for New York, carrying passengers many of whom were emigrants. It was the biggest civilian maritime disaster in the Atlantic Ocean until the sinking of Titanic eight years later, and is still the largest loss of life from a Danish merchant ship.

== History ==
=== Pieter de Coninck ===
Alexander Stephen and Sons of Linthouse, Glasgow built the ship in 1881 as Pieter de Coninck for the Belgian company Theodore C. Engels & Co of Antwerp. She was 3,359 GRT and 3,700 tonnes deadweight (DWT), her 1,000 kW (1,400 ihp) engine gave a speed of 10 knots (19 km/h). She could carry a maximum of 800 passengers.

=== SS Norge ===
In 1889, she was sold to a Danish company, A/S Dampskibs-selskabet Thingvalla, for its Stettin-Copenhagen-Kristiania-Kristiansand-New York service and renamed Norge. On 20 August 1898, Norge collided with the French fishing brigantine La Coquette in fog. La Coquette broke in two and sank, and 16 of the 25 crew aboard drowned. After financial difficulties, Thingvalla was bought in 1898 by Det Forenede Dampskibs-Selskab (DFDS), Copenhagen, which served the route as "Scandinavia-America Line". By then, the capacity of Norge was 1,100 passengers; 50 first class, 150 second class, and 900 third class.

== Final voyage ==
On 22 June 1904, Norge left Copenhagen under the command of Captain Valdemar Johannes Gundel. After taking on Norwegian emigrants at Kristiania and Kristiansand, the ship set course across the Atlantic Ocean, travelling north of Scotland to New York City. She was carrying a crew of 68 and 727 passengers. Among the steerage passengers, there were 296 Norwegians, 236 Russians, 79 Danes, 68 Swedes, and 15 Finns. Half of the steerage passengers had prepaid tickets, paid for by relatives living in the United States.

On 28 June, Norge ran aground on Hasselwood Rock, close to Rockall, in foggy weather. She was reversed off the rock after a few minutes, but the collision had ripped holes in the hull, and water began pouring into the hold. The crew of the Norge began lowering the lifeboats, but the first two lowered were destroyed by waves. Of the eight lifeboats on board, only five were successfully launched. Many passengers jumped overboard, only to drown. The Norge sank twelve minutes after the collision. Captain Gundal stayed with the ship as it sank, but managed to swim to one of the lifeboats.

According to author Per Kristian Sebak's account, more than 635 people died during the sinking, among them 225 Norwegians. The first survivors to be rescued, a group of 26, were found by the Grimsby trawler Sylvia. Thirty-two more were picked up by the British steamship Cervonax, and 70, including Captain Gundal, by the German steamship Energie. Some of the 160 survivors spent up to eight days in open lifeboats before rescue. Several more people died in the days that followed rescue, as a result of their exposure to the elements and swallowing salt water. Among the survivors was the poet Herman Wildenvey.

== Wreck today ==
The disaster remains the worst in Danish maritime history. The wreck of Norge was found off Rockall in July 2003 in 65 metres (213 ft) of water.

== See also ==
- List of United Kingdom disasters by death toll
