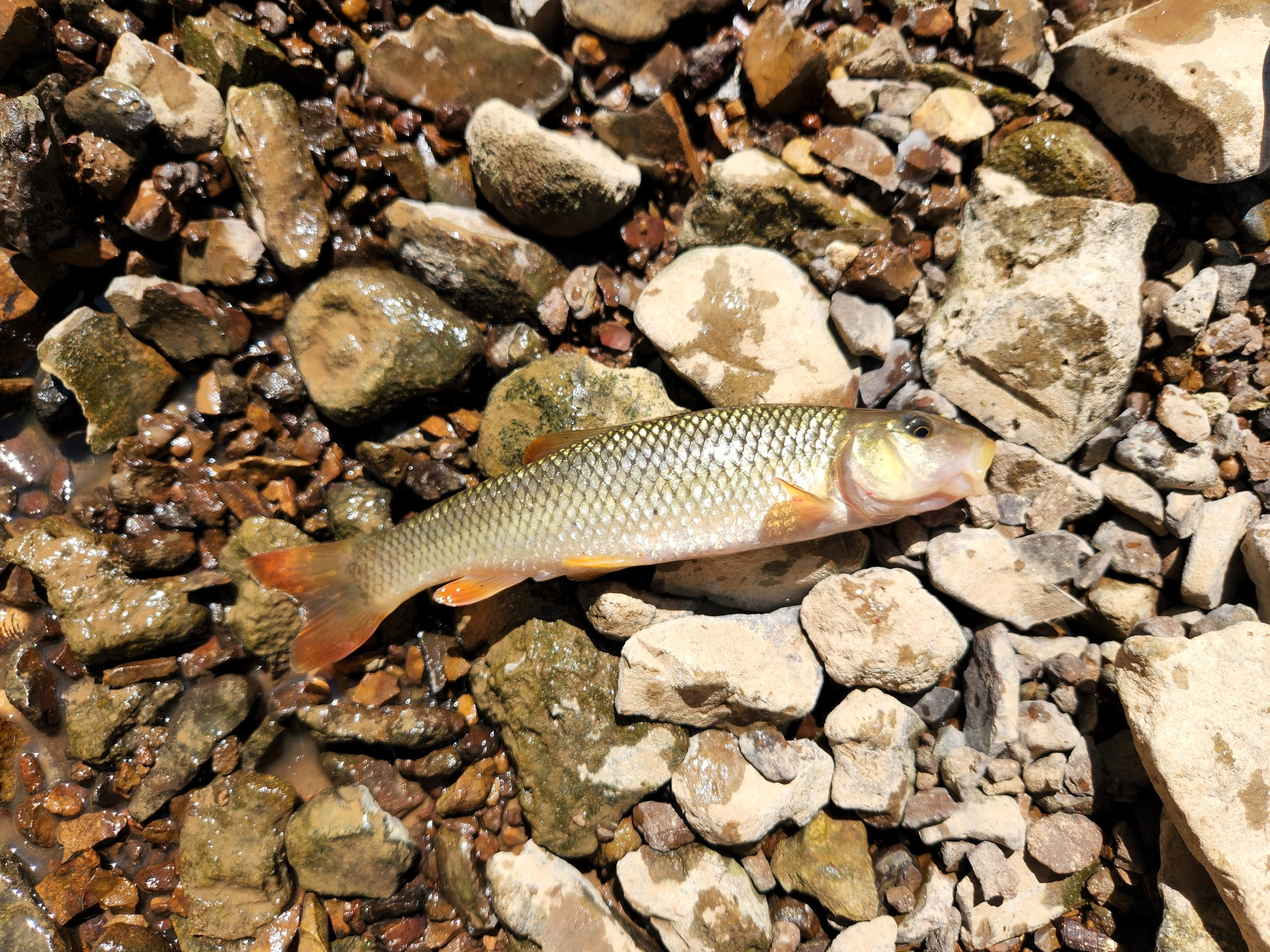

Conservation status
- Least Concern (IUCN 3.1)

Scientific classification
- Kingdom: Animalia
- Phylum: Chordata
- Class: Actinopterygii
- Order: Cypriniformes
- Family: Leuciscidae
- Subfamily: Pogonichthyinae
- Genus: Nocomis
- Species: N. effusus

Binomial name
- Nocomis effusus Lachner & R. E. Jenkins, 1967

= Redtail chub =

Species of fish

The redtail chub (Nocomis effusus) is a species of freshwater fish belonging to the family Leuciscidae, the shiners, daces and minnows. This species is found in the U.S. states of Tennessee and Kentucky.

== Geographic distribution ==
The redtail chub is found in north central Tennessee as well as south central Kentucky. Specifically, it is found in the central and western portions of the Ohio River basin, including in the upper Green, upper Barren, Cumberland, Duck, and lower Tennessee rivers. The impoundment of Lake Cumberland likely extirpated the species from the impounded area, as Nocomis has specific habitat requirements, including flowing water and medium gravel needed for successful reproduction. The redtail chub has not been found in the same waters as the river chub. This might be because of some interspecific interactions. However, the redtail chub prefers smaller streams than the river chub, so interspecific competition does not offer the entire explanation. It has been suggested that the two species could have shared habitat in what is now Cumberland Lake. Virtual restriction of redtail chub to Highland Rim habitats which are only marginally occupied by the river chub suggests a powerful physiographic component to these distributions. Apparently the redtail chub is strongly tied to the Mississippian gravel habitats of the Highland Rim.

== Ecology ==
Adult redtail chubs feed primarily on aquatic invertebrates, including small mollusks, insects, earthworms, and crustaceans. A potential predator of the redtail chub is the channel catfish, Ictalurus punctatus, which has been found preying on related species in Pennsylvania. The river chub could be considered a potential competitor, although it is not currently known to share habitat with the redtail chub. The redtail chub prefers clear rocky runs and pools of creeks and small rivers. It is also found in clear upland streams with predominantly gravel substrates. The right size gravel is extremely important because the redtail chub, like all Nocomis species, uses its mouth in order to collect the gravel to create nests in which to spawn. It prefers small to moderate sized streams, with low to moderate gradients and commonly with a riffle-pool type habitat. The redtail chub prefers coolwater streams with a moderate pH. Stream gradient, turbidity, and coal mine pollution probably restrict its present distribution and abundance. Gravel addition as a habitat restoration measure has been successful in reinstating the species' range. Some interspecific competition might exist between the redtail chub and the river chub (Nocomis micropogon), resulting in an altered distributional pattern. This is because the two species are thought to be allopatric. The redtail chub breeds in late spring and females reach sexual maturity around the 2-year mark.

== Life history ==
The redtail chub spawns in late spring, and only once per year. Sexual maturity is reached in the second year, when males begin to grow much more rapidly than females, and reach greater sizes. Average clutch size is anywhere from 500–1000 ova. The redtail chub, like all Nocomis species, creates troughs in which to breed. To do this, it will pick up small to medium-sized gravel with its mouth, and construct a nest about 6" tall. The male will guard the trough after eggs and sperm are released. Females often spawn in the nests of several males. The males will defend the nest and eggs until hatching takes place. Males will defend the nest from other members of the same species, however they often share their nests with members of other species including Clinostomus funduloides, Notropis rubellus, N. leuciodus, Lythrurus ardens, and species of Chrosomus. If the proper gravel shoals are not available, or if they are covered in silt, breeding can be hindered or even stopped entirely. There is no parental care after the eggs' hatching.

== Conservation and management ==
While the redtail chub is not federally listed as endangered or threatened, it has not been evaluated for such findings. There are not currently management practices in place for this species. The abundance of the redtail chub is thought to be in decline as the fish if used as bait by anglers and costs around $12 a dozen retail, making harvesting a lucrative trade.

Many other species rely on redtail chub nests for their own breeding. Decline of the redtail chub could lead to the decline of other species.

A closely related species, the hornyhead chub (N. biguttatus), has successfully bred in captivity.
