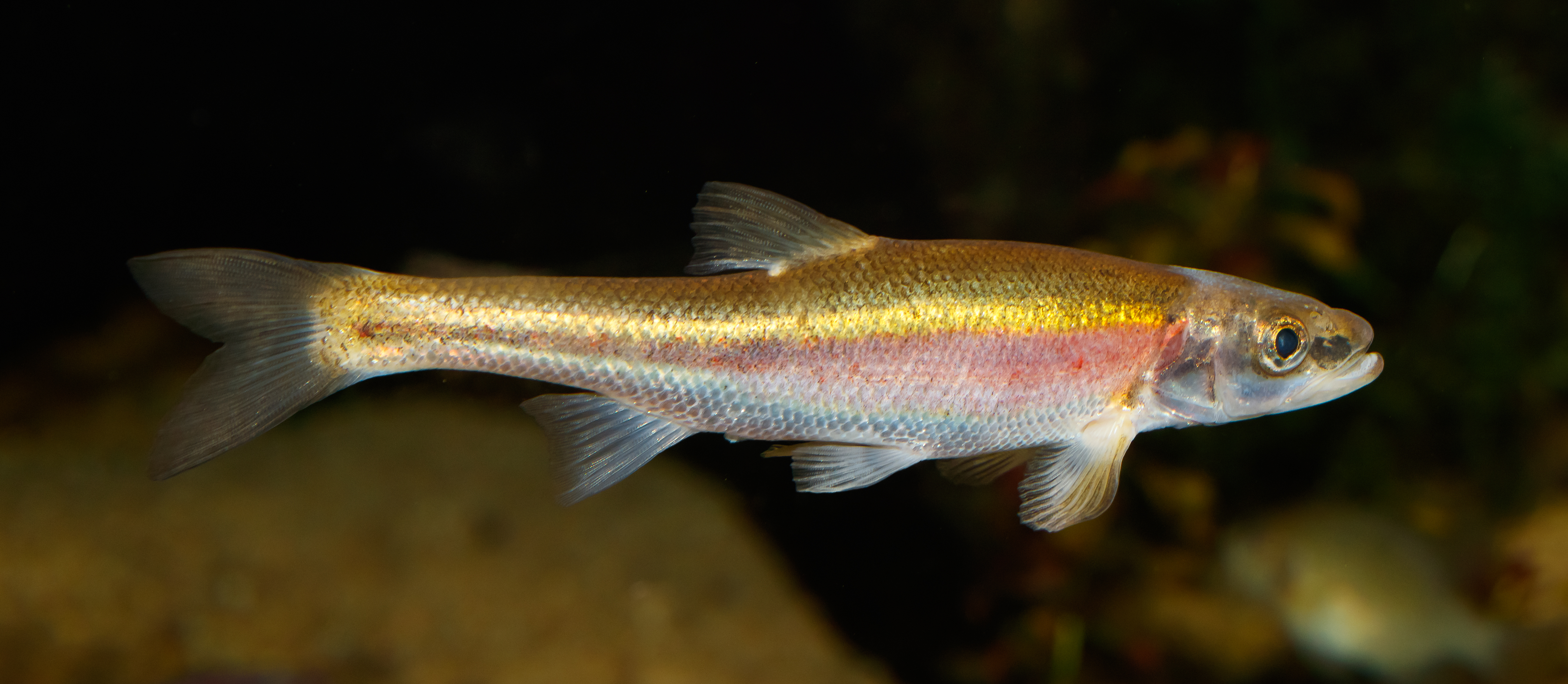
- Clinostomus elongatus

Conservation status
- Least Concern (IUCN 3.1)

Scientific classification
- Kingdom: Animalia
- Phylum: Chordata
- Class: Actinopterygii
- Order: Cypriniformes
- Family: Leuciscidae
- Subfamily: Pogonichthyinae
- Genus: Clinostomus
- Species: C. elongatus

Binomial name
- Clinostomus elongatus (J. P. Kirtland, 1840)

Synonyms
- Luxilus elongatus Kirtland, 1840; Squalius proriger Cope, 1865

= Redside dace =

Species of fish

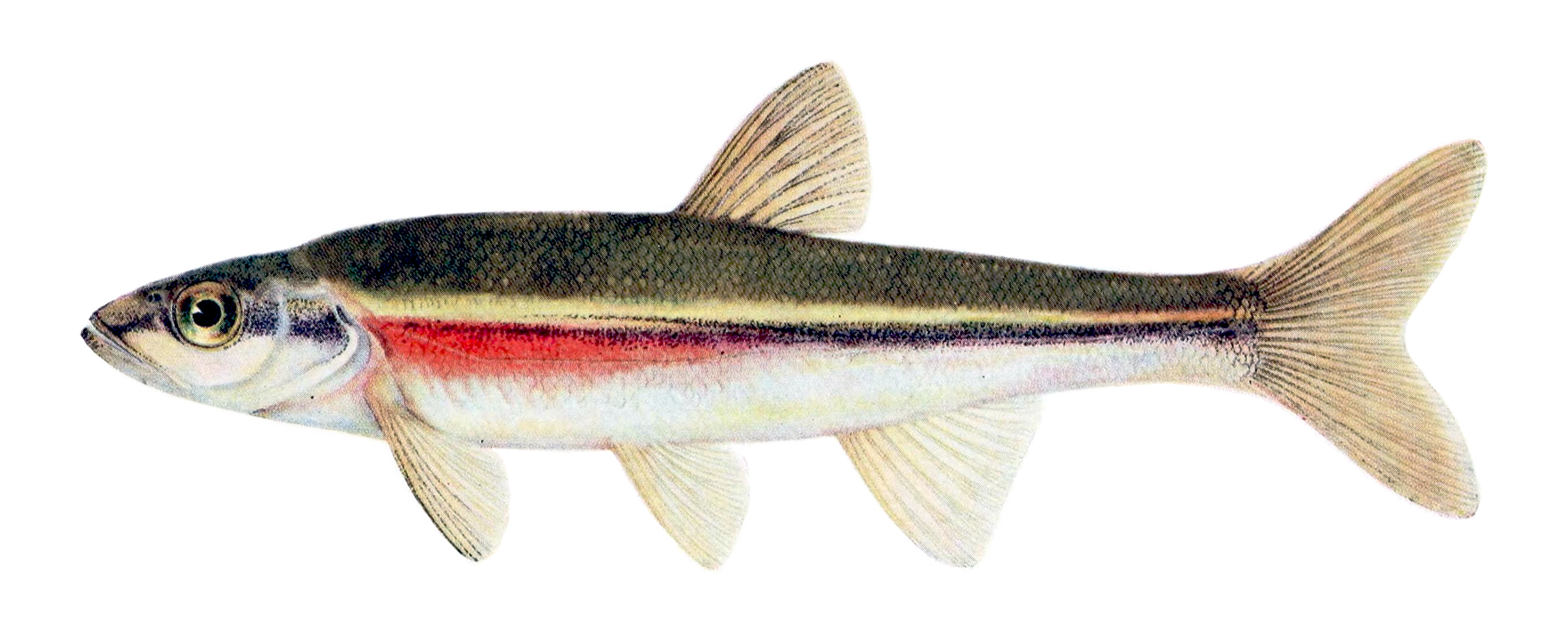
Painting of a redside dace by Ellen Edmonson.

The redside dace (Clinostomus elongatus) is a North American species of freshwater ray-finned fish in the family Leuciscidae. It is a surface-feeding specialist, thus acting as a conduit for nutrient transfers between terrestrial and aquatic environments. This fish is also known as an indicator species as it is sensitive to environmental disturbances.

== Taxonomy ==
American naturalist Jared Potter Kirtland described the redside dace in 1840. The species name elongatus is Latin for "prolonged" or "elongated", referencing the distinctive head and mouth shape.

== Description ==
The redside dace is brightly colored, with a wide red stripe extending from the head to the dorsal fin, running along the middle of the body. A bright yellow stripe generally extends from the head to caudal fin above the red lateral stripe. The back of this fish is generally dark, ranging from green to dark blue. Distinguishing it from other minnows, this species has a very large terminal mouth and protruding lower jaw, which is an effective adaptation for capturing prey from below.

The species' maximum total length is around 120 mm (4.7 in) but 65 mm (2.6 in) is the average of adults. Age estimation with scales suggests that redside dace do not live over four years. Within their first year of life, redside dace may attain a length of 31–48 mm (1.2–1.9 in) by late summer.

The redside dace is similar in appearance to the rosyside dace (Clinostomus funduloides), however the redside dace has a longer and more slender body with brighter red coloration on its sides. The two species are also allopatric.

== Distribution ==
=== United States ===
Redside dace are most abundant in Pennsylvania, especially in the upper parts of the Susquehanna River drainage. It is also found in some tributaries of the Laurentian Great Lakes, as well as in the Ohio River drainage and the upper parts of the Mississippi River drainage. Scattered populations exist in the states of Indiana, Michigan, Minnesota, and Wisconsin.

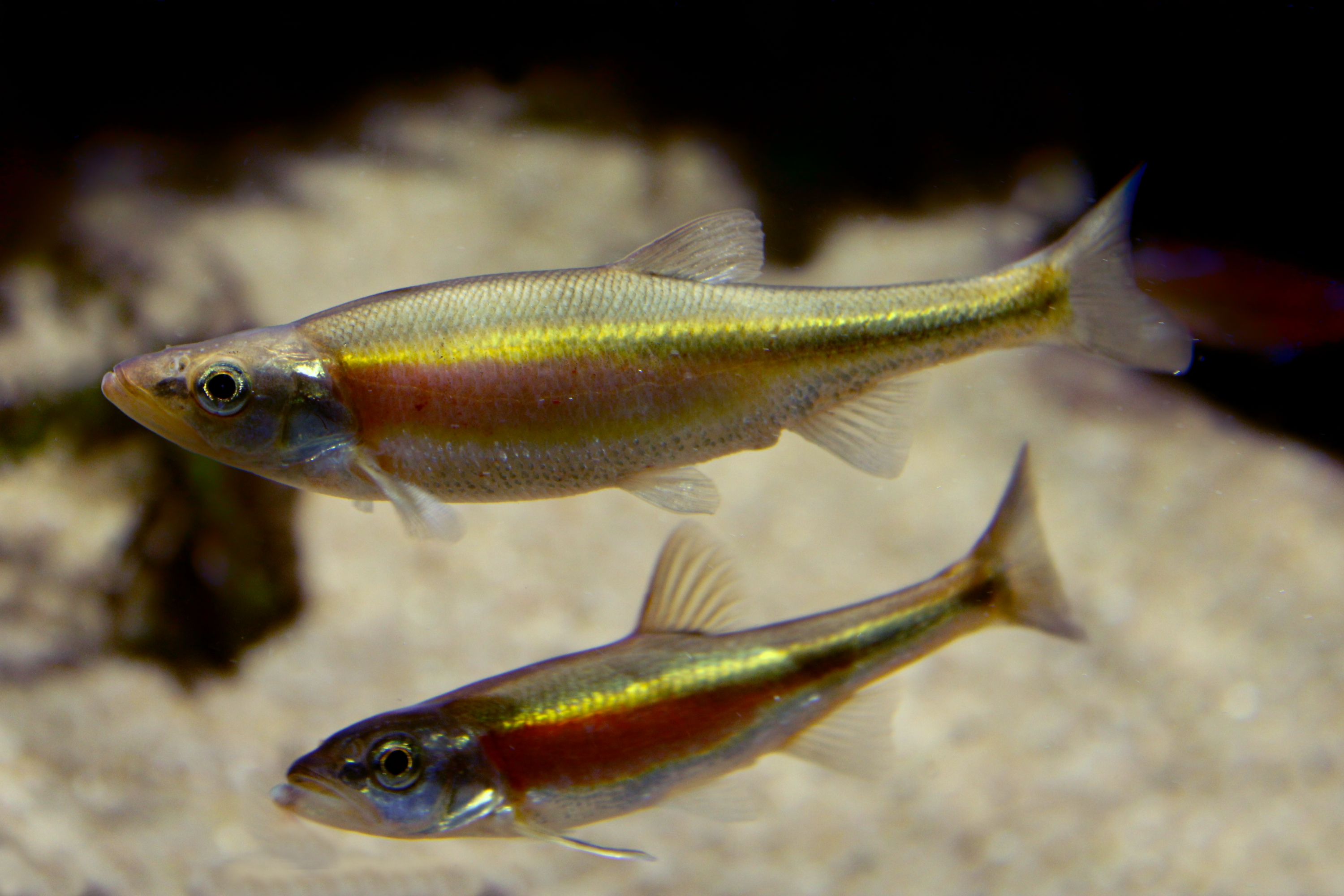
Captive redside dace held in a private aquarium.

=== Canada ===
The distribution of redside dace is mainly limited to southern Ontario with the Two Tree River on St. Joseph Island as an exception. Most populations have been identified in streams draining into the western portion of Lake Ontario, from Pringle Creek near Oshawa to Spencer Creek near Hamilton. Smaller populations exist in the drainages of Lake Simcoe (such as the Holland River system), Lake Erie (Irvine Creek), Berczy Creek in Markham and Lake Huron (Saugeen River system).

== Habitat ==
The species favours slow-moving, cool, and clear headwaters of river systems, with copious overhanging riparian vegetation, especially grasses, forbs, and low shrubs. A preferred stream features a succession of riffles, necessary for spawning, and pools, inhabited outside the breeding season.

== Diet ==
The redside dace is a midwater and surface specialist, regularly consuming terrestrial insects representing families of Empididae and Formicidae and aquatic insects of Chironomidae and order Ephemeroptera.

== Reproduction ==
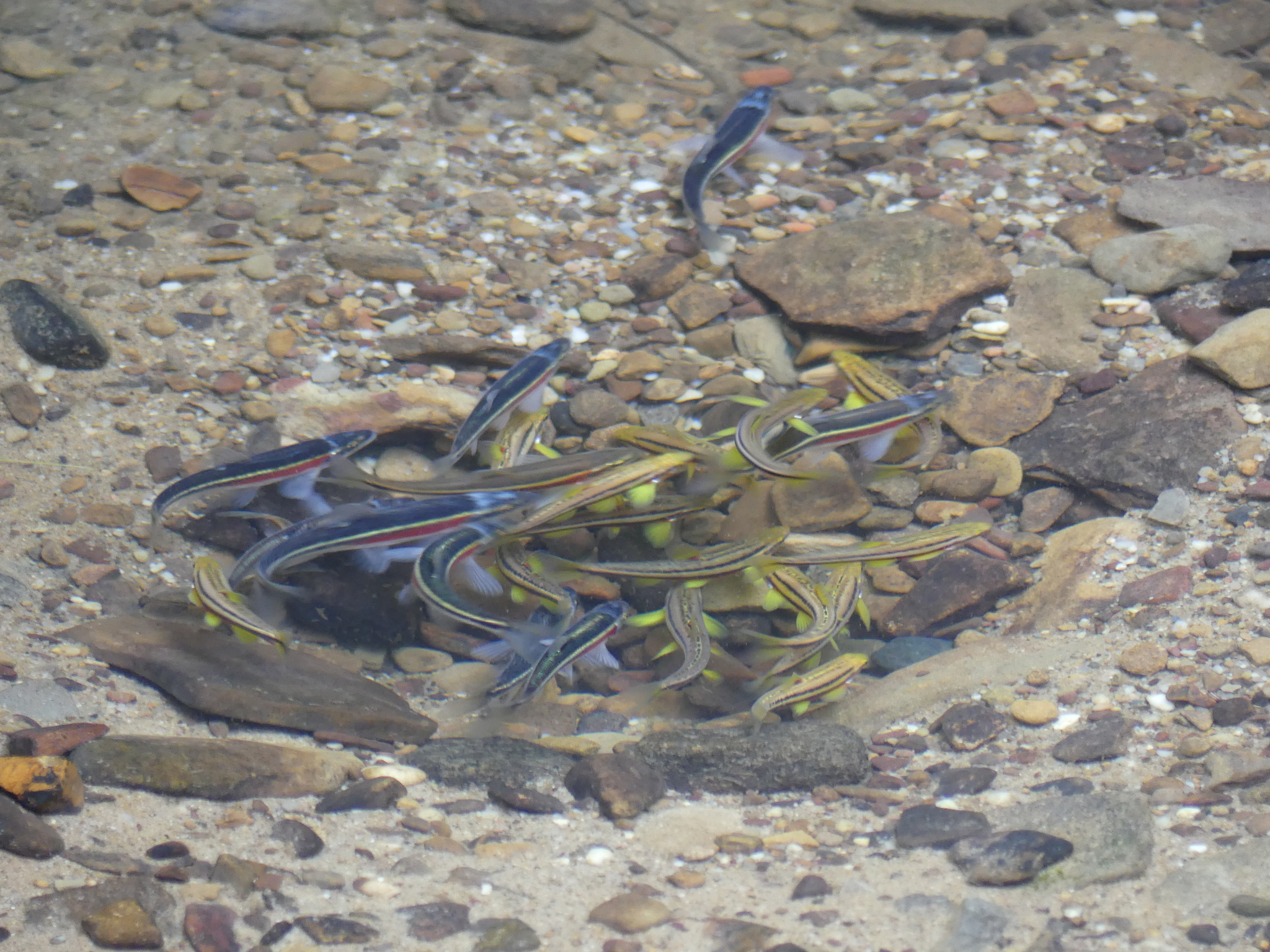
Redside dace and southern redbelly dace (Chrosomus erythrogaster) spawning on a gravel nest in Hocking County, Ohio.

Redside dace will opportunistically spawn over gravel nests called chub mounds built by creek chub (Semotilus atromaculatus), hornyhead chubs (Nocomis spp.) or stonerollers (Campostoma spp.). Spawning generally occurs in spring but the exact timing depends on location (or more specifically, latitude and climate) when water temperatures are at or near 18 °C (64 °F). During this time, males will leave pool habitat and begin staging near spawning gravel. Before spawning, males will engage in territorial displays and courtship behaviors. The act of spawning consists of multiple males gathering around a female, where both fish emit gametes simultaneously. The fertilized eggs are non-adhesive and remain in the nest, receiving no further parental care.

== Management ==
Although globally secure with locally abundant populations, the redside dace has declined in many areas of its range; some populations have been extirpated. The redside dace is listed as endangered in Indiana and Ontario, as threatened in Michigan, and as special concern in Wisconsin. Declines in redside dace are largely attributed to habitat destruction, more specifically deforestation, urbanization, and water pollution. Due to its intolerance for modified habitat, they could be considered an indicator species. Redside dace have limited use by humans but are occasionally kept in aquaria due to its stunning appearance.
