= Warrior shiner =

Conservation status
- Near Threatened (IUCN 3.1)

Scientific classification
- Kingdom: Animalia
- Phylum: Chordata
- Class: Actinopterygii
- Order: Cypriniformes
- Family: Leuciscidae
- Genus: Lythrurus
- Species: L. alegnotus

Binomial name
- Lythrurus alegnotus (Snelson, 1972)

Synonyms
- Notropis bellus alegnotus Snelson, 1972; Lythrurus bellus alegnotus (Snleson, 1972)

Species of fish

The warrior shiner (Lythrurus alegnotus) is a species of fish that is native to Alabama.

== Description ==
The shiner has a compressed body with large eyes and dark lips and chin. The upper body of the shiner has dark stripe and dots, and is a light olive color. The shiner is distinguishable from the blacktip shiner due to the dark strip around the side of the warrior shiner. The shiner is about 7.5 centimeters, with eleven to twelve anal fins. Breeding males have red colored fins.

== Taxonomy ==
It was originally treated as a subspecies of the blacktip shiner. However, it has since been treated as a unique species by a number of sources.

== Habitat ==
The shiner lives in small to medium-sized freshwater streams with minimal gradient and substrate ranging from sand to bedrock. The shiner prefers to live in deep pools that are downstream from water willows. The fish mainly lives in the Black Warrior River system in Alabama. Populations of Lythrurus alegnotus co-exist with populations of Lythrurus bellus in Lost Creek in Walker County, Alabama, the North River, and in Yellow Creek and Hurricane Creek in Tuscaloosa County, Alabama.

== Conservation status ==
The shiner is rated as near-threatened by the International Union for Conservation of Nature. Its habitat range is less than 7,500 square kilometers, and many local populations of Lythrurus alegnotus have gone extinct due to the continued degradation of stream quality and the effects of strip-mining. The shiner is not considered to be vulnerable because of the existence of more than ten population centers and the lack of fragmentation in population distribution. However, the IUCN still recommends the continued monitoring of warrior shiner populations and their habitat.
