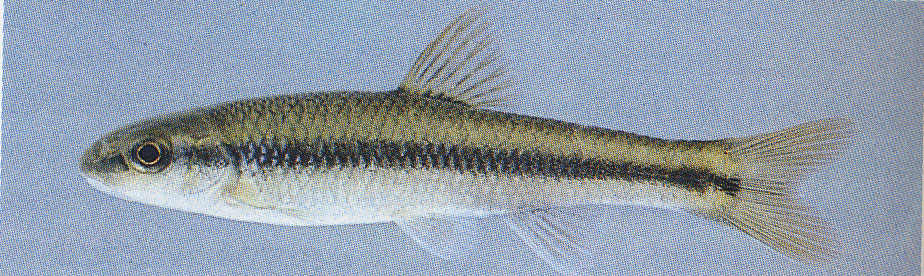
- Nocomis micropogon

Conservation status
- Least Concern (IUCN 3.1)

- Secure (NatureServe)

Scientific classification
- Kingdom: Animalia
- Phylum: Chordata
- Class: Actinopterygii
- Division: Teleostei
- Order: Cypriniformes
- Family: Leuciscidae
- Genus: Nocomis
- Species: N. micropogon

Binomial name
- Nocomis micropogon (Cope, 1865)

Synonyms
- Ceratichthys micropogon Cope, 1865

= River chub =

Species of fish

The river chub (Nocomis micropogon) is a species of freshwater ray-finned fish belonging to the family Leuciscidae, the shiners, daces and minnows. It is one of the most common fishes in North American streams.

== Appearance and anatomy ==
The river chub is a robust minnow, dark olivaceous above to dusky yellow below, with orange-red fins, large scales, a large slightly subterminal mouth, and a small barbel (whisker-like organ) at the corners of the jaw. During the breeding season, sexually mature males develop pinkish-purple coloration, and swollen heads with tubercles between the eyes and snout tip (they are sometimes called hornyheads). The river chub grows to a maximum of about 33 centimetres (13 in), with males larger than females. Common length is about 13.5 cm (5.3 in).

== Distribution ==
The river chub is among the most common fishes in North American streams. Its range extends primarily through most of the Great Lakes and Appalachian regions. The river chub is found in clear, medium to large creeks and rivers with moderate to swift current over rock and gravel substrate, from southeast Ontario and southern New York to Michigan and Indiana, south to northwest South Carolina to northwest Alabama. This includes the Susquehanna River system, James River system, Great Lakes basin (except Lake Superior), Ohio River basin, Santee River, Savannah River, and Coosa River. It has been introduced into the Ottawa River system in Ontario, and may owe its presence in the Santee, Savannah and Coosa Rivers to introduction by fishermen emptying bait buckets. The river chub is generally considered widespread and abundant with no apparent major threats. Exceptions are Illinois, where it is considered Critically Imperiled in its very limited range on the Wabash River; Alabama, where it is considered Imperiled; and in Georgia it is ranked as Vulnerable. Populations in Ohio have been extirpated by turbidity and siltation in western regions and are threatened by acid mine drainage in the coal region. Also, dams have inundated areas that were once habitat for the river chub eliminating bits of its range.

== Ecology ==
The river chub is prey for larger fish and is used as bait by fishermen seeking large game fish such as bass and catfish. Its diet consists primarily of aquatic invertebrates. One study of river chub stomach contents in western New York found that insects were 70% of the volume of food consumed, plants or protists 20% (mainly filamentous algae), crustaceans 5% (primarily Cambarus), and mollusks 4% (primarily gastropods), plus a few fish and arachnids. Caddisfly larvae and fly larvae (primarily Simulium and Chironomus) made up just over half the total food consumed. Mayflies (mainly baetids) were about 6% of the total. Other insects consumed were Coleoptera (beetles), Hemiptera (true bugs), Hymenoptera (bees, wasps, and ants), Plecoptera (stoneflies), Neuroptera (net-winged insects like laceflies), and Lepidoptera (butterflies and moths).

The river chub presence in a stream is a good indicator of water quality. They are intolerant of pollution, turbidity and siltation, and require a minimum pH 6.0. They provide ecological services to mussels (as glochidia hosts), and nest associates, some of which may not spawn in its absence. Fresh-water mussels release small masses of microscopic larvae known as glochidia in a loose gelatinous matrix. The glochidia encyst on the gills of river chubs where they metamorphose into juveniles and then drop off. It is suspected that the river chub feeds on the gelatinous masses as it does drifting insects. The river chub is host to mussels including the endangered fine-rayed pigtoe, Tennessee clubshell and probably many other amblemine glochidia.

Nest associates of the river chub include species of the Clinostomus, Luxilus, Lythrurus, Notropis, Chrosomus, Rhinichthys, and Semotilus genera. Preference for river chub nests by nest associates may be due to a lack of spawning habitat for some species, but some require the association with pebble nest builders to reproduce. For example, in an effort to establish a more viable population, pebble nest associate Chrosomus cumberlandensis was bred in aquaria with a man made pebble nest, and milt from a breeding male river chub was added to induce spawning. Nest associates and host may equally benefit from their affiliation. Also, hybridization among nest associates is not uncommon. One example is the Nocomis micropogon X Rhinichthys cataractae which is sometimes identified as Pararhinichthys bowersi.

== Life history ==
The river chub lives up to 5 years, reaching sexual maturity in its second year. In late spring the breeding male builds a pebble nest close to the bank of the stream in low to moderate current. Females produce about 500–1000 eggs that are probably spread among several different males' nests. The pebble nest also provides spawning habitat for several other minnow species.

In early spring the adult male river chub undergoes pronounced changes in his appearance in preparation for breeding. His head swells and grows well-developed tubercles from eyes to snout tip. Small tubercles grow on the outer part of his first several pectoral fin rays and his body develops a pinkish-purple coloration. When the water temperature reaches 16–19 °C (61–66 °F) he finds an area in low to moderate current, typically 0.5–1 m (1 ft 8 in – 3 ft 3 in) deep and begins to build a pebble nest. Nest construction begins with the river chub male creating a shallow depression 0.5–1 m (1 ft 8 in – 3 ft 3 in) in diameter by removing the stones with his mouth and depositing them on the lateral margins. Next, collecting a relatively uniform set of up 10,000 pebbles about 1 cm (0.39 in) in size from as far away as 25 m (82 ft), he builds a short platform and then a 20–30 cm (7.9–11.8 in) high circular mound with a central trough on the upstream slope. When a gravid female enters the trough he presses her against the side by placing his caudal peduncle over hers and lodging her head between his opercle and pectoral fin. The male fans the nest and defends it from rivals with head butting and circle swim behaviors.

The eggs hatch in 5–6 days and the larvae grows to become a 19 mm (0.75 in) long juvenile in about 57 days. At two years the river chub is 95–110 mm (3.7–4.3 in) and sexually mature. Its maximum life span is 5 years and it can grow up to 33 cm (13 in). In addition to the breeding male's changes, other sexual dimorphic characters include slightly larger paired, anal, and dorsal fins in the female, and faster growth rate and larger size in the male. For example, a typical four-year-old male is about 18 cm (7.1 in) and female about 13 cm (5.1 in).

== Current management ==
River chub is one of the most common fishes in its range. About 20% of North American minnows are considered imperiled. None of the imperiled is a mound builder like the river chub. The main threats it faces are pollution, siltation, and habitat destruction primarily by dam building. Like many minnow species it requires flowing water over coarse substrate to reproduce so dams impact its range negatively. Dams can also trap the stone and gravel sediments and keep them from replenishing the waters below. This sediment-starved condition has impacted some species, such as the redd nesting northern hog sucker and black redhorse, that require natural deposits of coarse material to spawn, but typically the river chub continues to be able to find gravel to build its own spawning habitat.

The river chub does suffer where pollution, turbidity and siltation, acid mine drainage and acid precipitation/deposition impact its habitat. It has been extirpated in areas with excess turbidity and siltation in western Ohio. Riparian buffers in agricultural areas can help keep turbidity and contaminants from waterways. The Swatara Creek in Pennsylvania had no fish due to acid mine drainage. Limestone treatments and wetlands were built to mitigate the acid mine drainage and the river chub was one of the first species to return.
