= Bruce W. Stallsmith =

Bruce W. Stallsmith is a professor of biology at the University of Alabama in Huntsville (UAH) in Huntsville, Alabama and served as the 2000–2008 president of the North American Native Fishes Association (NANFA). He now serves as the Research Grant Chair for NANFA.

His current research interests include the reproductive ecology of the Telescope Shiner, Notropis telescopus; the effects of 11-ketotestosterone in the Scarlet Shiner, Lythrurus fasciolaris; the threatened status of the Flame Chub, Hemitremia flammea; and the genetic variability of the Stippled Studfish, Fundulus bifax, a fish endemic to the Tallapoosa drainage system in Alabama.

Stallsmith teaches Introduction Biology, Organismal Biology, Vertebrate Zoology, and Vertebrate Reproduction at UAH.
