= Wolfpen Hollow =

Valley in the U.S. state of Missouri

Wolfpen Hollow is a valley in northern Oregon County in the Ozarks of southern Missouri, United States.

The headwaters of the intermittent stream are at 36°52′55″N 91°25′45″W and the confluence with Bull Camp Hollow is at 36°50′33″N 91°24′33″W.

Wolfpen Hollow took its name from the wolf pen, a device used to snare wolves.
