= Mountain shiner =

Conservation status
- Least Concern (IUCN 3.1)

Scientific classification
- Kingdom: Animalia
- Phylum: Chordata
- Class: Actinopterygii
- Order: Cypriniformes
- Family: Leuciscidae
- Subfamily: Pogonichthyinae
- Genus: Lythrurus
- Species: L. lirus

Binomial name
- Lythrurus lirus (Jordan, 1877)

Synonyms
- Nototropis lirus Jordan, 1877

Species of fish

The mountain shiner (Lythrurus lirus) is species of freshwater ray-finned fish belonging to the family Leuciscidae, the shiners, daces and minnows. The species can be found in drainages within Virginia, Alabama, Tennessee and Northwestern Georgia. In addition, the species is nearly restricted to the Coosa River system above the Fall Line in the Alabama River drainage. The environment of the species is fresh benthopelagic water, and it lives in a temperate range from 38°N-33°N. Lythrurus lirus typically prefers clear flowing creeks and/or small rivers. These waters typically have moderate gradients and bottom materials that range from sand-gravel to rubble-boulders. The population of this species is represented by large subpopulations and locations. However, while the total adult population is not known specifically, it is speculated to be large. The normal length of the species is typically 6 cm but it has been recorded that the maximum length to be 7.5 cm, which was a male. The peak of their mating season is between the months of May and June.

== Geographic distribution ==
The species of the genus Lythrurus are commonly found in small streams that are distributed mainly in drainages of the Gulf Coast, locations in the Mississippi Valley, and the Piedmont region of the Atlantic Seaboard. The mountain shiner normally located above the Fall Line in Tennessee region, and prefers freshwaters that are of temperate climate. The geographical range which it inhabits is from 38°N to 33°N. Now, the exact population size is not known, however, it is assumed to be fairly large. The temporal variation of population size could be subjected to extrinsic factors. An example of this for the population size variance would be the annual, seasonal and even daily level changes that occur in aquatic systems. These fluctuations are a possibly explanation of why there are sometimes subpopulations that are isolated from other populations within the same river or streams.

== Ecology ==
It prefers benthopelagic freshwater. These waters are typically clear flowing, riffle-type creeks, streams or small rivers. These types of waters can range from sand-gravel to rubble-boulder bottoms, and contain moderate gradients. The mountain shiner and the redfin shiner are considered "sister taxa". Since these two species are sister taxa it is safely assumed that they both have similar feeding habits and most likely feed on the same organisms.

Now the competition of the mountain shiner consists of mainly of the other species within the same subpopulation of Lythrurus and also other species like darters that are located within the same region. The main predators of this species are larger taxa of fish, which include the different species of trout.

== Life history ==
Little data has been recorded on the life history, specifically, but data has been collected on its size, spawning and migrating patterns. The mountain shiner is a native species to North American and is not documented in other countries. According to a paper done by Shmidt, he states that the maximum length for most species in the genus Lythrurus is less than 70mm. For the mountain shiner specifically, the average adult size is between 35-55mm. However, some male specimens have been documented to reach a maximum size of 75 mm (Facts about mountain shiner). This rare maximum length could be due to the environment as well as nutrients that are available and maybe limited pressure from predators within the aquatic system.

The typically mating season for the mountain shiner is in between the time span of May and can end between the months of June/July, depending on location. Now the species does make seasonal migrations throughout the year. However these migrations are not of extensive distances. They travel approximately less than 200 km from their original location. The locations that they will migrate to are normally for either breeding or are winter grounds for hibernation.

== Current management ==
Currently, mountain shiners are a least concern species on the Red List of the International Union for Conservation of Nature. With its status as a low conservation concern, the species does not have any significantly required management or monitoring. However, some research actions are being conducted on the species. The mountain shiner though has some localized threats that are not a major problem for the species as a whole. However, research is ongoing to collect more data to help better understand the patterns and habits of this species, found in four states.

Even though the species has never been listed as an endangered species on the Red List, localized threats to L. lirus could exist. The main threat towards the species is human interference. One cause for this is anthropogenic modification of habitats. This can occur with the reduction of streams, dams placed changing the flow of streams connected to rivers and contaminants that are introduced to the aquatic systems via run off from agricultural lands. These changes are in excess of the natural course of fluctuating water levels previously discussed.
