= Horned chub =

Horned chub may refer to:

- Semotilus atromaculatus, a small minnow, a freshwater fish found in the eastern US and Canada
- Hornyhead chub (Nocomis biguttatus), a small species of minnow in the northern central USA to Canada
