= Cherryfin shiner =

Conservation status
- Least Concern (IUCN 3.1)

Scientific classification
- Kingdom: Animalia
- Phylum: Chordata
- Class: Actinopterygii
- Order: Cypriniformes
- Family: Leuciscidae
- Subfamily: Pogonichthyinae
- Genus: Lythrurus
- Species: L. roseipinnis

Binomial name
- Lythrurus roseipinnis (O. P. Hay, 1885)

Synonyms
- Minnilus rubripinnis O. P. Hay, 1881; Notropis roseipinnis O. P. Hay, 1885

Species of fish

The cherryfin shiner (Lythrurus roseipinnis) is a species of fish native to Mississippi, Alabama, and Louisiana in the southeastern United States. A 2007 analysis of the genus Lythrurus noted that individuals assigned to the cherryfin shiner exhibited significant genetic divergence and that there is greater genetic diversity within this species than current taxonomy reflects.

== Description ==
It is distinguished by having black spots on the tips of its dorsal and anal fins. Males in breeding condition have pale to bright red fins, giving the fish the common name cherryfin shiner. It has a fairly large eye with a deep, compressed body that is pale olive above with a dusky stripe on its back. It also has a dark stripe on the rear half of its side and dusky colored lips and chin. Adults reach lengths up to 3 inches (7.6 cm) and have 11-12 anal rays and 36-49 lateral scales. This fish is very similar to the pretty shiner, and their ranges meet north of Mobile Bay in southern Alabama, but are otherwise geographically separated.

== Distribution ==
It ranges across the Gulf Coast from extreme eastern Louisiana north of Lake Pontchartrain, eastward across much of southern Mississippi, to extreme southeastern Alabama around Mobile Bay. In Mississippi, its range also includes the Yazoo River, Big Black River, and Bayou Pierre drainages in the Mississippi River watershed. One specimen has been recorded from Coles Creek in Mississippi.

== Habitat ==
The cherryfin shiner occupies headwater streams and small rivers with moderate currents that provide riffle and riffle-pool habitats with sand or sand-gravel bottoms.

== Behavior ==
It feeds primarily during the day on aquatic insects.

== Conservation status ==
This is a common fish with a relatively stable population.
