= Henley Hollow =

Valley in the US state of Missouri

Henley Hollow is a valley in Warren County in the U.S. state of Missouri. The intermittent stream in Henley Hollow is a tributary to Little Lost Creek in the Little Lost Creek State Forest.

The headwaters are at 38°49′09″N 91°16′00″W and the confluence is at 38°46′37″N 91°16′12″W.

Henley Hollow most likely bears the name of a pioneer citizen.
