= Gobble Hollow =

Valley in the US state of Missouri

Gobble Hollow is a valley in eastern St. Francois County in the U.S. state of Missouri. It is a tributary to the Little Saint Francois River.

The headwaters of the intermittent stream in the valley are at 37°41′20″N 90°14′38″W and the confluence with the Little Saint Francois is at 37°41′28″N 90°16′59″W.

Gobble Hollow was so named due to the presence of wild turkeys in the valley.
