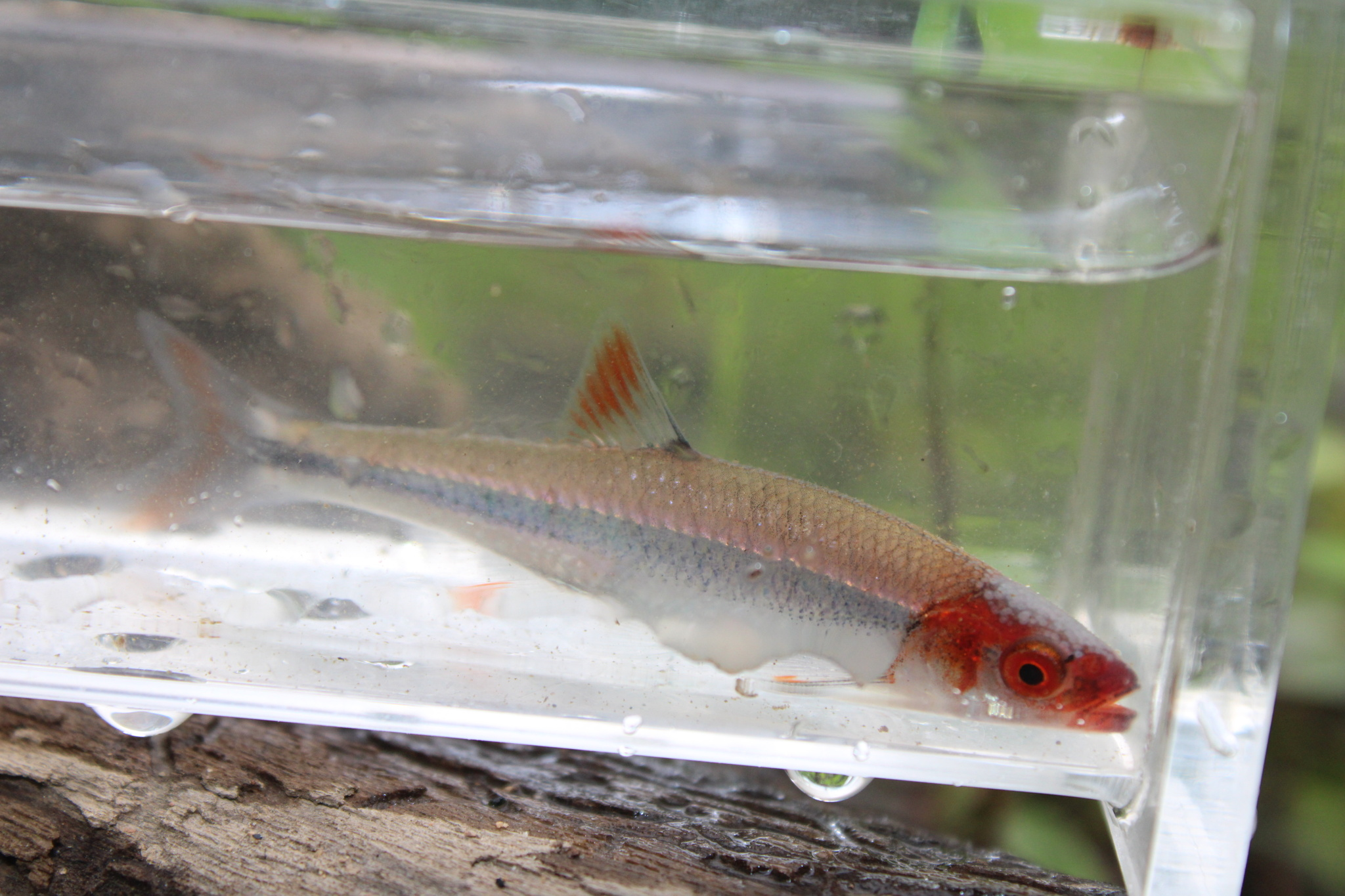

Conservation status
- Least Concern (IUCN 3.1)

Scientific classification
- Kingdom: Animalia
- Phylum: Chordata
- Class: Actinopterygii
- Order: Cypriniformes
- Family: Leuciscidae
- Subfamily: Pogonichthyinae
- Genus: Lythrurus
- Species: L. matutinus

Binomial name
- Lythrurus matutinus (Cope, 1870)

Synonyms
- Alburnellus matutinus Cope, 1870

= Pinewoods shiner =

Species of fish

The pinewoods shiner (Lythrurus matutinus) is a species of freshwater ray-finned fish belonging to the family Leuciscidae, the shiners, daces and minnows. It is one of the six species endemic to North Carolina, where it is native to the Neuse River basin, with a single introduced record from the Haw River. The fish is about 8.6 cm. in length, and is the fourth longest fish endemic to North Carolina. The fish also has red tail, dorsal, and pelvic fins. The rest of it is gray, except for the area right under the dorsal fin.
