= Ouachita shiner =

Ouachita Mountain shiner

Conservation status
- Least Concern (IUCN 3.1)

Scientific classification
- Kingdom: Animalia
- Phylum: Chordata
- Class: Actinopterygii
- Division: Teleostei
- Order: Cypriniformes
- Family: Leuciscidae
- Subfamily: Pogonichthyinae
- Genus: Lythrurus
- Species: L. snelsoni

Binomial name
- Lythrurus snelsoni (H. W. Robison, 1985)

Synonyms
- Notropis snelsoni Robison, 1985

Species of fish

The Ouachita shiner or Ouachita Mountain shiner (Lythrurus snelsoni) is a species of ray-finned fish in the family Leuciscidae, the shiners, daces and minnows. It is found only in the upper Little River system in the Ouachita Mountains of Arkansas and Oklahoma in the United States.
