= Bluefin stoneroller =

Conservation status
- Least Concern (IUCN 3.1)

- Apparently Secure (NatureServe)

Scientific classification
- Kingdom: Animalia
- Phylum: Chordata
- Class: Actinopterygii
- Order: Cypriniformes
- Family: Leuciscidae
- Subfamily: Pogonichthyinae
- Genus: Campostoma
- Species: C. pauciradii

Binomial name
- Campostoma pauciradii Burr and Cashner, 1983

Species of fish

The bluefin stoneroller (Campostoma pauciradii) is a species of freshwater ray-finned fish in the family Leuciscidae, the shiners, daces and minnows. This fish is endemic to the southeastern United States.

== Distribution ==
It is found primarily in the Altamaha and Apalachicola river watersheds in Georgia and Alabama. There are also records from the Alabama and Tennessee river watersheds in Georgia.

== Ecology ==
The bluefin stoneroller lives in rocky riffles, runs, and sometimes pools in streams.

== Life history ==
It can be distinguished from other members of the genus Campostoma by its number of gill rakers, which usually number 12-16, as well as the blue-green fin coloration in breeding males and meristic trait variation.
