= Bigmouth chub =

Conservation status
- Least Concern (IUCN 3.1)

Scientific classification
- Kingdom: Animalia
- Phylum: Chordata
- Class: Actinopterygii
- Order: Cypriniformes
- Family: Leuciscidae
- Subfamily: Pogonichthyinae
- Genus: Nocomis
- Species: N. platyrhynchus

Binomial name
- Nocomis platyrhynchus Lachner & R. E. Jenkins, 1971

Species of fish

The bigmouth chub (Nocomis platyrhynchus) is a species of freshwater fish belonging to the family Leuciscidae, the shiners, daces and minnows. This species is found in the eastern United States.

== Description ==
The bigmouth chub has a body length that averages 15.2 centimeters and can reach up to 21.4 centimeters. The chub has an elongated body that is nearly circular in cross section. It has a triangular head and a pointy snout. The mouth of the chub is medium-sized and has a barbell on each side.

The chub has eight dorsal fin rays, eight pelvic fin rays, seven anal fin rays, and fourteen to seventeen pectoral fin rays.

The fish is covered with cycloid scales. The scales on the chub's dorsal section, or top of the fish, have brown pigment. The scales on the ventral section, or bottom of the fish, lack pigment and are white in appearance.

== Habitat ==
It is generally found in pools and fast moving waterways in North Carolina, Virginia, West Virginia. Many populations are located in the New River of West Virginia and its tributaries. The fish prefers clear rivers with warm temperatures. The substrate of rivers inhabited by the bigmouth chub ranges from pebbles to boulders. It avoids the shallowest parts of rivers and waterways, and tends to be found near substrate.

== Reproduction ==
The chub reproduces through spawning. Spawning occurs in gravel spawning mounds created by the male. The mounds tend to be located in areas with small to large-sized gravel and with medium water speeds.

== Conservation status ==
It is ranked as being of least concern by the International Union for Conservation of Nature. The fish is not seen as at risk for extinction due to its large and stable population size, large habitat range and a lack of wide-scale threats to its survival.
