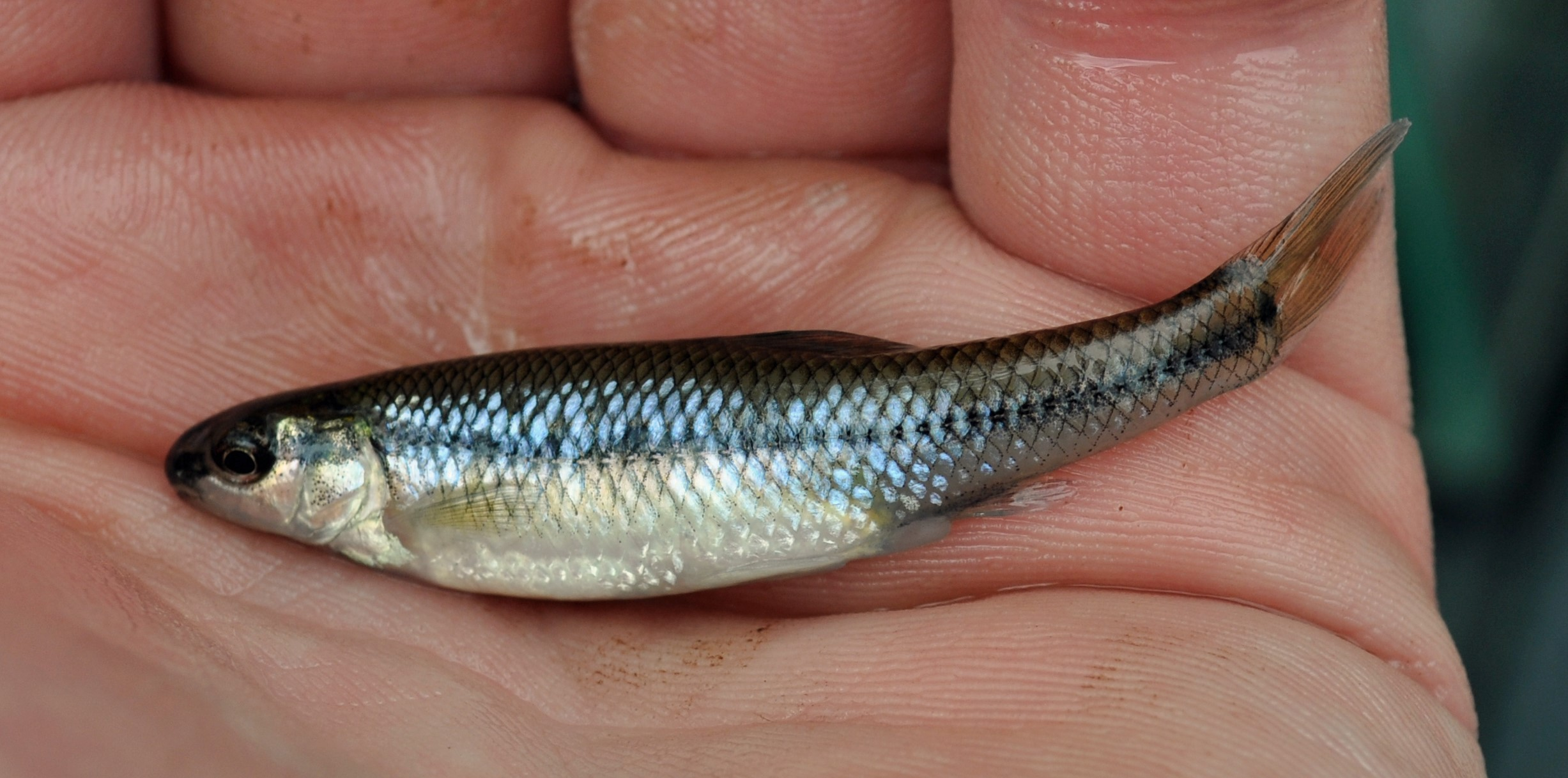
- Campostoma anomalum

Scientific classification
- Kingdom: Animalia
- Phylum: Chordata
- Class: Actinopterygii
- Order: Cypriniformes
- Family: Leuciscidae
- Subfamily: Pogonichthyinae
- Genus: Campostoma; Agassiz, 1855

Type species
- Rutilus anomaleus Rafinesque, 1820

= Campostoma =

Genus of fishes

Campostoma, the stonerollers, is a genus of freshwater ray-finned fish in the family Leuciscidae, the shiners, daces and minnows. The fishes in this genus are found in North America.

== Species ==
- Campostoma anomalum (Rafinesque, 1820) (Central stoneroller)
- Campostoma oligolepis C. L. Hubbs & Greene, 1935 (Largescale stoneroller)
- Campostoma ornatum Girard, 1856 (Mexican stoneroller)
- Campostoma pauciradii Burr & Cashner, 1983 (Bluefin stoneroller)
- Campostoma pullum (Agassiz, 1854)
- Campostoma spadiceum (Girard, 1856) (Highland stoneroller)
