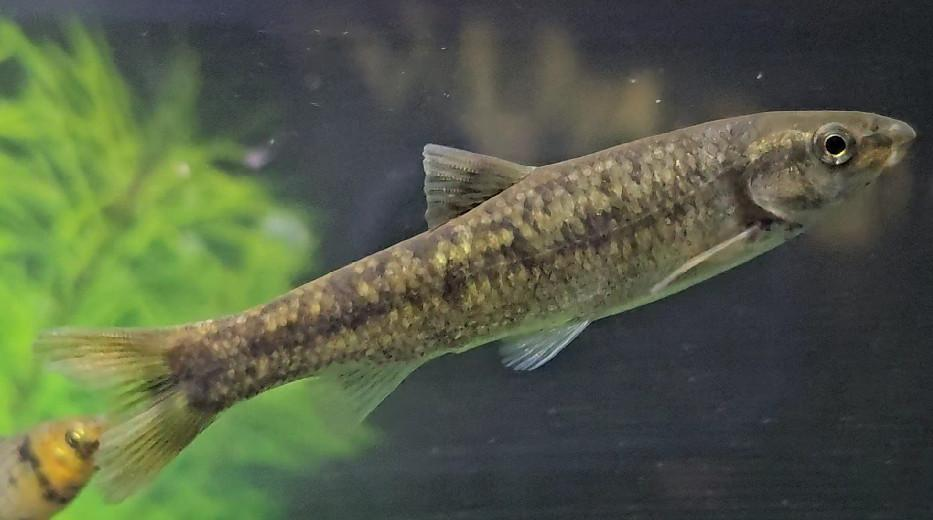

Scientific classification
- Kingdom: Animalia
- Phylum: Chordata
- Class: Actinopterygii
- Division: Teleostei
- Order: Cypriniformes
- Family: Leuciscidae
- Subfamily: Pogonichthyinae
- Genus: Campostoma
- Species: C. pullum

Binomial name
- Campostoma pullum Agassiz, 1854

Synonyms
- Campostoma anomalum pullum

= Campostoma pullum =

Species of fish

Campostoma pullum is a species of freshwater ray-finned fish in the family Leuciscidae, the shiners, daces and minnows. It is endemic to the United States. It is one of the 324 fish species found in Tennessee.
