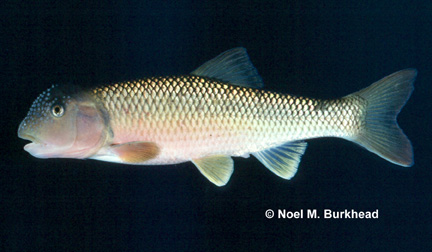

Conservation status
- Least Concern (IUCN 3.1)

Scientific classification
- Kingdom: Animalia
- Phylum: Chordata
- Class: Actinopterygii
- Order: Cypriniformes
- Family: Leuciscidae
- Subfamily: Pogonichthyinae
- Genus: Nocomis
- Species: N. raneyi

Binomial name
- Nocomis raneyi Lachner & R. E. Jenkins, 1971

= Bull chub =

Species of fish

The bull chub (Nocomis raneyi) is a species of freshwater fish belonging to the family Leuciscidae, the shiners, daces and minnows. This fish is found in the Atlantic drainages of the eastern United States between the James River in Virginia and the Neuse River in North Carolina, predominantly above the Fall Line. It can grow to 32 cm (13 in) total length, although more commonly it is about 18 cm (7.1 in). It is a chubby fish with pointed snout, small, subterminal mouth, gold or brown sides, pale or yellowish fins, and in spawning males, rose color on the belly.
