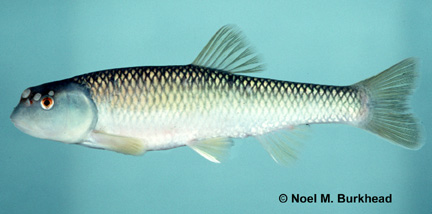

Conservation status
- Least Concern (IUCN 3.1)

Scientific classification
- Kingdom: Animalia
- Phylum: Chordata
- Class: Actinopterygii
- Order: Cypriniformes
- Family: Leuciscidae
- Subfamily: Pogonichthyinae
- Genus: Nocomis
- Species: N. leptocephalus

Binomial name
- Nocomis leptocephalus (Girard, 1856)

Synonyms
- Ceratichthys leptocephalus Girard, 1856; Nocomis bellicus Girard, 1856; Nocomis leptocephalus interocularis Lachner & Wiley 1971

= Bluehead chub =

Species of fish

The bluehead chub (Nocomis leptocephalus) is a species of freshwater fish belonging to the family Leuciscidae, the shiners, daces and minnows. native to North America. Its name is due to its appearance, as breeding males have a blue head and develop large nuptial tubercles. Adult bluehead chubs are, on average, between 70 and 160 mm (2.8 and 6.3 in) in length. They have a robust body with uniformly large scales. The scales are present on the belly and breast. They have a pored body, a weakly falcate pectoral fin, and pharyngeal teeth. They have a large mouth, small eyes, and a terminal barbel. Other characteristics include a darkened lateral band, spot on the caudal fin, and red coloration of the fins and iris of the eyes. They have 40 lateral line scales and 8 anal rays. The bluehead chub is a freshwater fish, and lives in pools, rivers, and streams. They feed on insects and plants.

== Habitat ==
Bluehead chubs inhabit freshwater pools, creeks, and small to medium rivers with sandy or rocky bottoms. They live in warm to cool waters that have swift currents and are usually turbid.

== Reproduction and life cycle ==
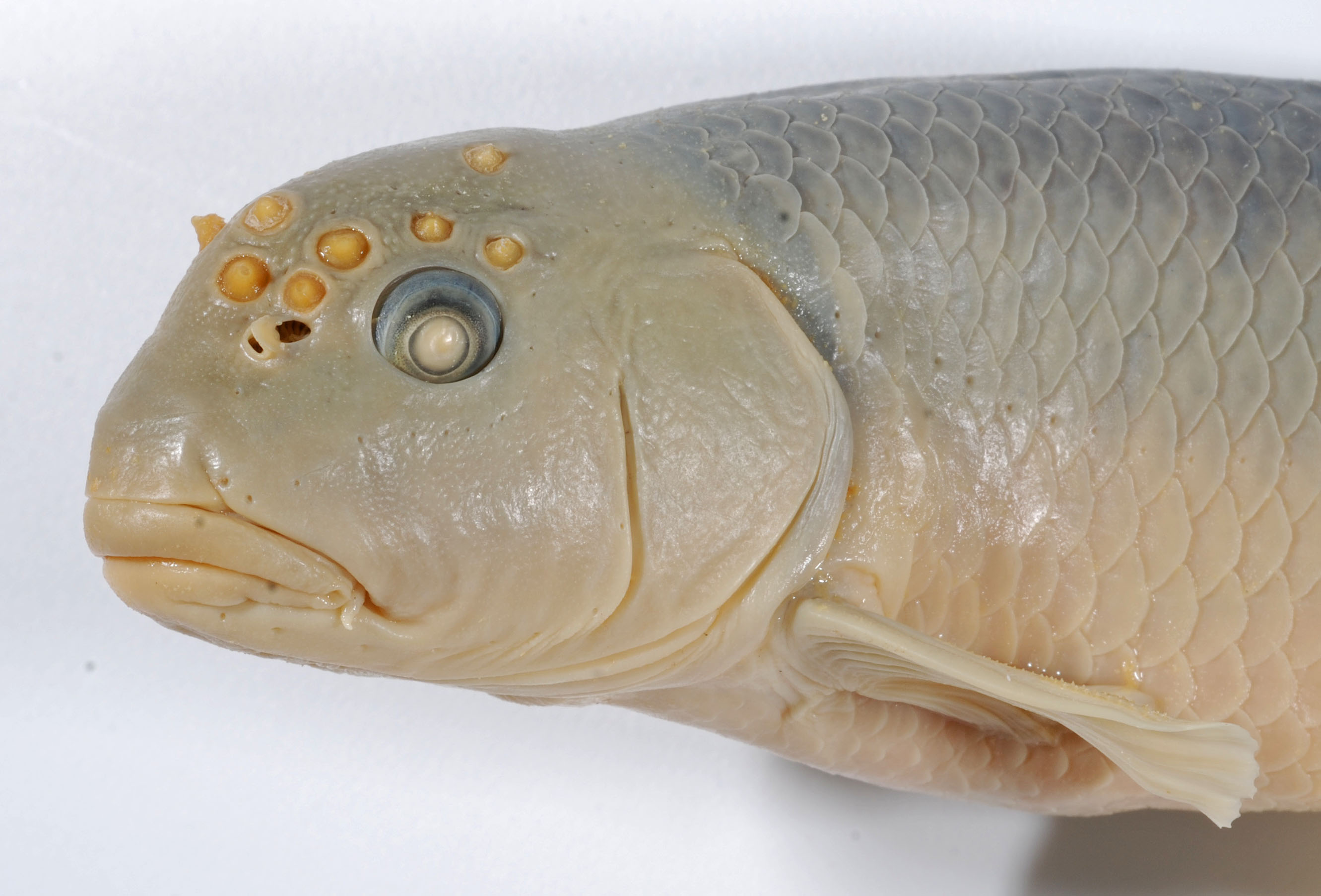
Breeding tubercles on male. NB:This specimen is discoloured due to preservation. The head would be blue, with white tubercles, in life.

Bluehead chubs spawn in the spring and reproduce by external fertilization in which the female releases eggs onto the bottom and the male releases milt to fertilize the eggs. The male makes a nest of gravel in a mound for the female to deposit the eggs. After fertilization, the male guards the eggs until they hatch. They mature for three years before reaching reproductive maturity.

== Distribution ==
The bluehead chub is native to the United States and can be found in the southeastern United States. It is distributed throughout the York River system of Virginia, the Atlantic and Gulf coast drainage, and the lower Mississippi River drainage into Mississippi and Louisiana. Its range includes Virginia, West Virginia, Alabama, Mississippi, North Carolina, Florida and Louisiana. As a result of bait bucket releases by fishermen, the bluehead chub has spread to multiple drainage basins in which it is not native.

== Etymology ==
The genus name Nocomis comes from the Native American name for "grandmother".
