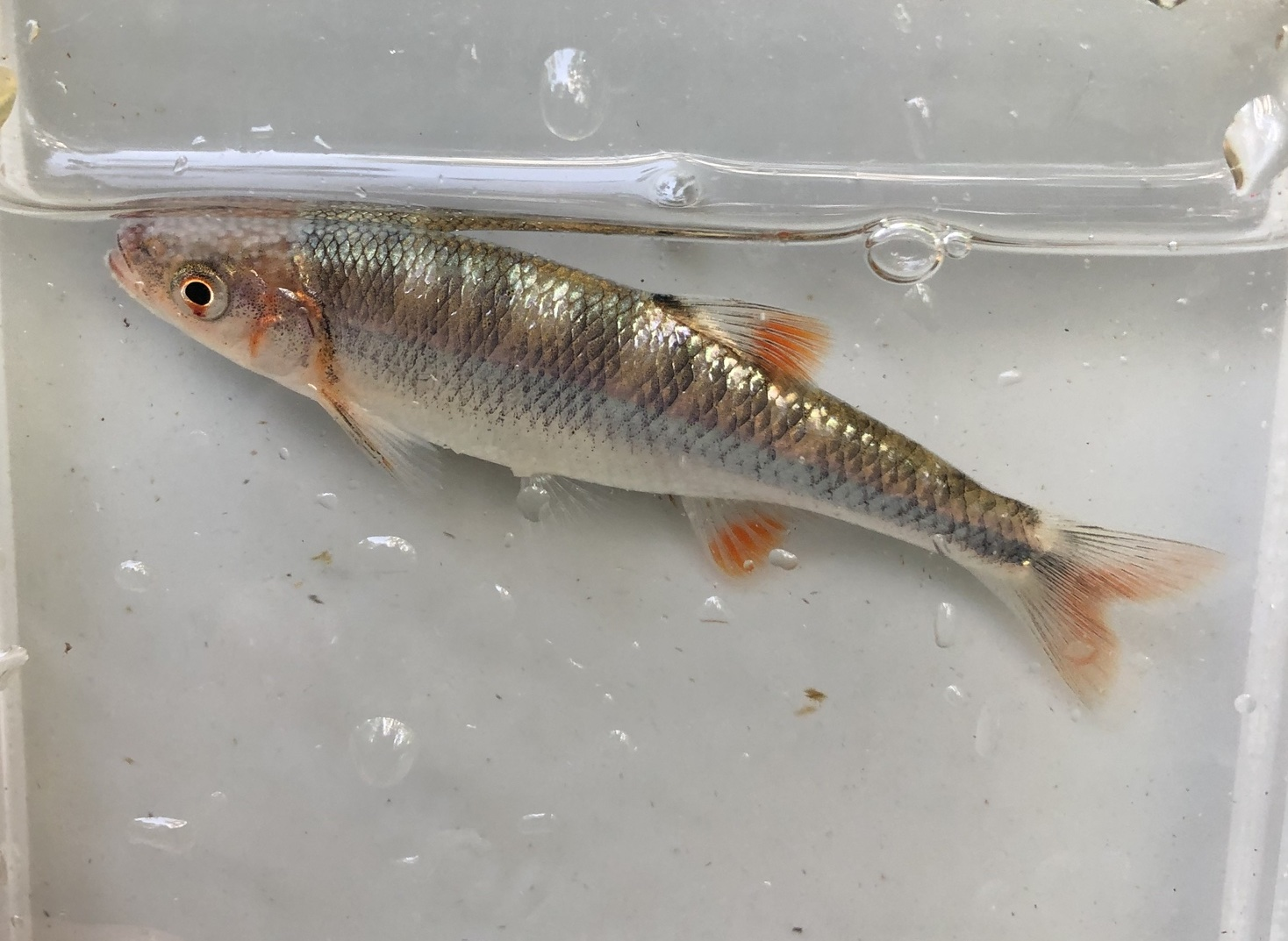
- Male in breeding coloration

Conservation status
- Least Concern (IUCN 3.1)

- Secure (NatureServe)

Scientific classification
- Kingdom: Animalia
- Phylum: Chordata
- Class: Actinopterygii
- Division: Teleostei
- Order: Cypriniformes
- Family: Leuciscidae
- Genus: Lythrurus
- Species: L. fasciolaris

Binomial name
- Lythrurus fasciolaris (Gilbert, 1891)

Synonyms
- see text under Taxonomy

= Scarlet shiner =

Species of fish

The scarlet shiner (Lythrurus fasciolaris) is a freshwater fish native to the eastern United States.

== Appearance and anatomy ==
Scarlet shiners get their name from the bright coloration of breeding males, who display a vibrant red on their dorsal, caudal, pelvic, anal, and pectoral fins. The dorsal fin often has a dark blotch at the front of its base. Females and non-breeding males tend to display less distinct coloration on their bodies besides faint red on their fins. An adult's average length is 2 to 3 inches (5.1 to 7.6 cm), with a maximum of 4 inches (10 cm).

Scarlet shiners can be distinguished from the redfin shiner (L. umbratilis) by the four to eleven saddle bands or tiger stripes over the back and upper sides, which can be seen more clearly on males, and have more slender bodies that are laterally compressed. They also have fewer anal fin rays, averaging nine to eleven. Non-breeding males and females still have the silver-blue coloration and the typical cryptic coloration of dark on top and lighter white or cream colored belly. Breeding males of both species develop tubercles on their heads; however, L. fasciolaris generally does not have tubercles on its cheeks, and the lower jaw bears one row of tubercles versus two in L. umbratilis.

== Geographic distribution ==
Scarlet shiners live in subtropical, benthopelagic freshwater environments. Scarlet shiners thrive in waterways that have clear water, and they tend to occupy the higher gradient streams with coarser substrates. Typically, the scarlet shiner's habitat is situated around the Ohio River basin, but they range down as far as Eagle Creek in Kentucky. The species can be found specifically in the southwestern part of Ohio down to the Scioto River and westward, reaching the Little River basin in Tennessee then connecting to the Tennessee River to flow down into the northernmost parts of Alabama and some areas within West Virginia and Virginia. Scarlet shiners have also been thought to be introduced in certain waterways in Ohio, such as the Ohio River basin to the Muskingum River drainage. Other areas where one may encounter scarlet shiners are in the Cumberland drainages in Kentucky and Tennessee along with the ones in Alabama, Mississippi, and Georgia.

== Ecology ==
Adult scarlet shiners typically feed on aquatic invertebrates. There are a variety of species that the scarlet shiner is a natural host for, such as for the glochidia of the Pyramid Pigtoe mollusk in Kentucky.

Scarlet shiners inhabit small to medium-sized sluggish to clear-water streams where the substrate is coarser, such as rocks, pebbles, or gravel, with medium current flow. Though this species can tolerate a little murky water, they cannot survive in water that is heavy in silt or sediment, which deprives them and their eggs of oxygen. They are intolerant to high turbidity, siltation, and low-dissolved oxygen levels. In midwinter, scarlet shiners inhabit deeper, quieter pools of water.

Predators of the scarlet shiner are bigger fish, like trout, that inhabit the same streams they do. Often, scarlet shiners are absent from waters hosting trout, especially those at high elevations.

Competitors of the scarlet shiner are other fish that inhabit the same stream waters it does. A few examples are the striped shiner (Luxilus chrysocephalus), bluntnose minnow (Pimephales notatus), and the telescope shiner (Notropis telescopes). The main competitor of the scarlet shiner is the closely related species, the redfin shiner (Lythrurus umbratilis). They tend to inhabit the same types of waterways, though the redfin shiner habits clearer and lower located streams.

Abundance of scarlet shiners populations reduce when silt deposits from human development of land near their streams are above their tolerance levels. Introduction of invasive species, like rainbow trout, to various streams by humans have caused for decline or fragmentation of scarlet shiner populations across their geographical distribution. However, the scarlet shiner has also been introduced in areas where it is not native, more often in Ohio areas.

== Life history ==
Scarlet shiners are seasonal spawners that spawn once throughout the late spring and summer months over clean sand or fine gravel substrates in faster currents of riffles and pools. On occasions, scarlet shiners have been known to use the nest of larger minnows for their own offspring. Their nests are similar to those of other Lythurus species.

Like many species, the scarlet shiner exhibits sexual dimorphism during the breeding months, in which breeding males often have a bright blue, shiny coloration with their bright red fins while females have red fins that are much less visible than the males.

The average life span of scarlet shiners is three years. After their first year, they are reproductively mature or capable. However, reproductive success depends on the environmental conditions since scarlet shiners undergo physiological changes and reproductive traits and behaviors in response to these conditions.

Populations of scarlet shiners remain relatively stable or somewhat declining after spawning periods. A decline in number can be traced back to being introduced into larger bodies of water, where schools are often smaller, or an increase in predators or invasive species that compete with the species for resources. Siltation of stream waters also decreases the number of scarlet shiners since heavy silt can suffocate their eggs, reducing their reproductive success. Another reason that could decline their numbers is a change in the environment. If the environment is not the right temperature for the scarlet shiners during their spawning season, then they will not spawn until the water reaches their favorable temperature.

== Management ==
Currently, scarlet shiners are a least concern species. States with scarlet shiner populations have begun actively researching the species to collect more data on it, such as Kentucky and Ohio, where they are native and introduced respectively.

Scarlet shiners were never an endangered or threatened species since their numbers have been relatively stable or increasing in areas where they are native or introduced, where they have become problematic in some areas. Problematic areas include Lake Barkley in Kentucky, a human created lake, where scarlet shiner and other fish populations become abundant due to the recent construction of the lake which increases biodiversity at certain times during the seasons. However, at other times, the lake causes species biodiversity to degrade due to hydrologic regimes, channel morphology, high siltation, nutrient loading, low-dissolved oxygen, and high turbidity, which many species cannot tolerate.

Though the species is listed as least concern, scarlet shiners do have the tendency to hybridize with its close relative, the redfin shiner, in areas where their populations mix, like the Little River basin in Kentucky. The hybridization is a result of the introduction of scarlet shiners into streams where they were previously never found, allowing for them to interact with the redfin shiner and cross-breed with them. There has not been significant research done to determine if this hybridization will cause for either species' abundance to decline since both can be found in isolated areas where their numbers are stable or abundant.

== Taxonomy ==
Lythrurus fasciolaris was originally named by Gilbert in 1891 as a subspecies of Notropis umbratilis but in 1996 it was named as a valid species. The type species for the genus Lythrurus is Semotilus diplemia but when you follow the synonymy of this name then it is currently recognised as a synonym of Chrosomus erythrogaster. When Jordan coined Lythrurus it is now thought he may have been referring to the species named by Rafinesque as Rutilus ruber as he notes that the species he describes as Lythrurus diploemus is Rafinesque's Ruitlis ruber and not Kirtland's Leuciscus diplemius. The Catalog of Fishes gives Rutilus ruber as being a synonym of L. fasciolaris, albeit with some uncertainty.
