= Robert Cashner =

American zoologist

Robert C. Cashner
- Known for: Described Fundulus bifax and Campostoma pauciradii; President, American Society of Ichthyologists and Herpetologists (1997)
- Scientific career
- Fields: Ichthyology
- Institutions: University of New Orleans – Faculty, Dean, Vice Chancellor

Robert C. Cashner is an American ichthyologist and retired academic administrator.

He was the first to describe the Stippled studfish (Fundulus bifax) and the bluefin stoneroller (Campostoma pauciradii).

Cashner was a faculty member at the University of New Orleans for many years. He was dean of UNO's graduate school from 1996 to 2008 and vice chancellor for research from 2001 to 2008. He was elected as president of the American Society of Ichthyologists and Herpetologists in 1997.

== Taxon described by him ==
- See Category:Taxa named by Robert Cashner

== Selected publications ==
- Robert C. Cashner; Royal D. Suttkus (1977). "Ambloplites constellatus, a New Species of Rock Bass from the Ozark Upland of Arkansas and Missouri with a Review of Western Rock Bass Populations" (PDF). The American Midland Naturalist. 98 (1): 147–161. doi:10.2307/2424721. JSTOR 2424721.
- Burr, Brooks M.; Cashner, Robert C. (1983). "Campostoma pauciradii, a new Cyprinid fish from southeastern United States, with a review of related forms". Copeia. 1983 (1): 101–116. doi:10.2307/1444703. JSTOR 1444703.
- Cashner, R.C., J.S. Rogers and J.M. Grady 1988 Fundulus bifax, a new species of the subgenus Xenisma from the Tallapoosa and Coosa river systems of Alabama and Georgia. Copeia (3):674-683.
- Bart, H. L., M. F. Cashner, and K. R. Piller. 2011. Phylogenetic relationships of the North American cyprinid subgenus hydropholax. Molecular Phylogenetics and Evolution 59:725-735.
- Cashner, Robert C.; Burr, Brooks M.; Rogers, James S. (February 27, 1989). "Geographic Variation of the Mud Sunfish, Acantharchus pomotis (Family Centrarchidae)". Copeia. 1989 (1): 129–141. doi:10.2307/1445614. JSTOR 1445614.
- Warren, Melvin L.; Burr, Brooks M.; Walsh, Stephen J.; Bart, Henry L.; Cashner, Robert C.; Etnier, David A.; Freeman, Byron J.; Kuhajda, Bernard R.; Mayden, Richard L.; Robison, Henry W.; Ross, Stephen T.; Starnes, Wayne C. (2000). "Diversity, Distribution, and Conservation Status of the Native Freshwater Fishes of the Southern United States". Fisheries. 25 (10): 7–31. doi:10.1577/1548-8446(2000)025<0007:DDACSO>2.0.CO;2.
