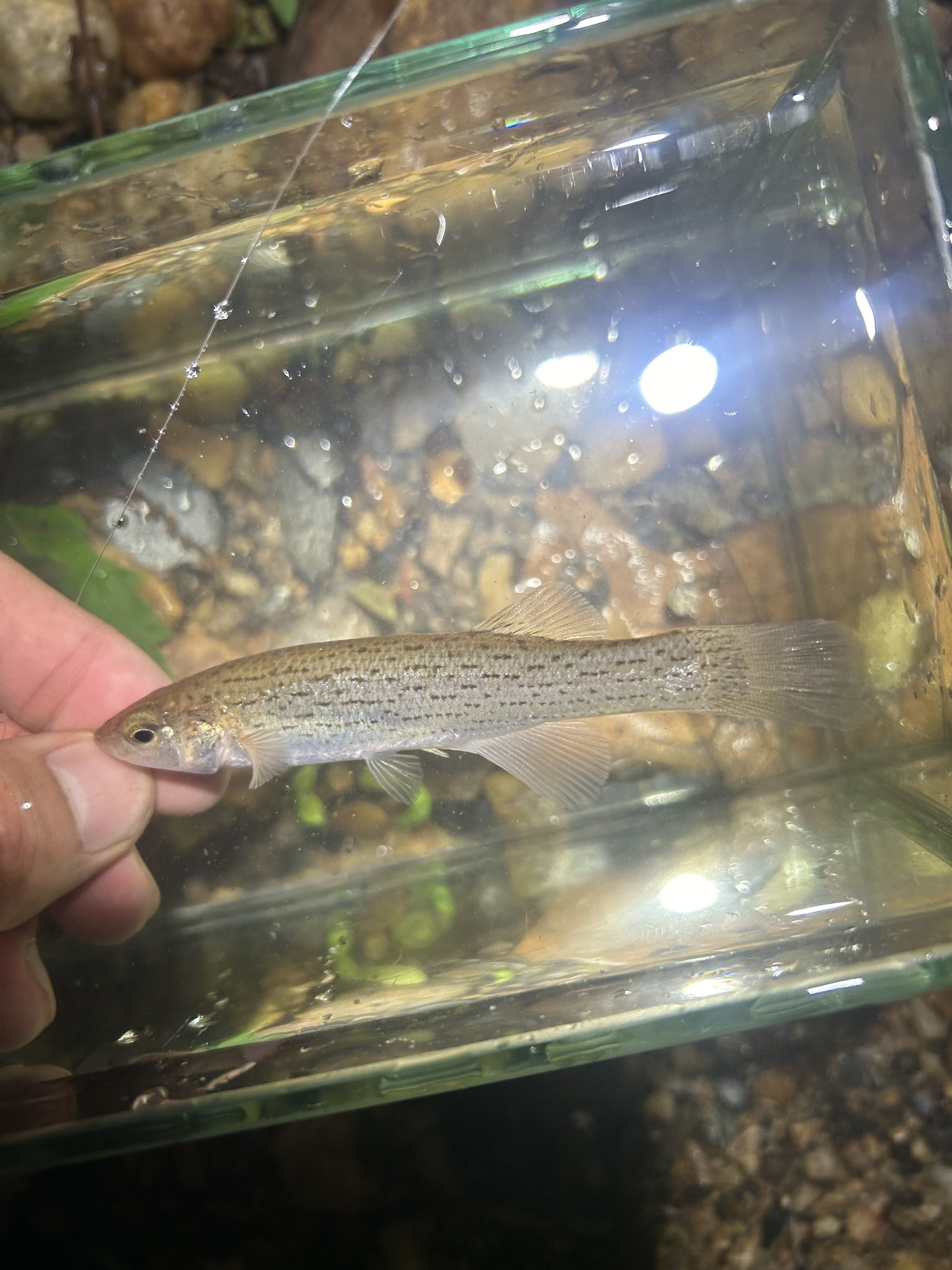

Conservation status
- Near Threatened (IUCN 3.1)

- Imperiled (NatureServe)

Scientific classification
- Kingdom: Animalia
- Phylum: Chordata
- Class: Actinopterygii
- Division: Teleostei
- Order: Cyprinodontiformes
- Family: Fundulidae
- Genus: Fundulus
- Species: F. bifax

Binomial name
- Fundulus bifax Cashner & Rogers, 1988.

= Stippled studfish =

Species of fish

The stippled studfish (Fundulus bifax) is a small freshwater fish which is endemic to the Tallapoosa River system in Georgia and Alabama, USA; and Sofkahatchee Creek (lower Coosa River system) in Alabama. It belongs to the genus Fundulus in the killifish and topminnow family, Fundulidae. It has been evaluated by the International Union for Conservation of Nature as "near threatened" and has not been recorded in Georgia since 1990.
