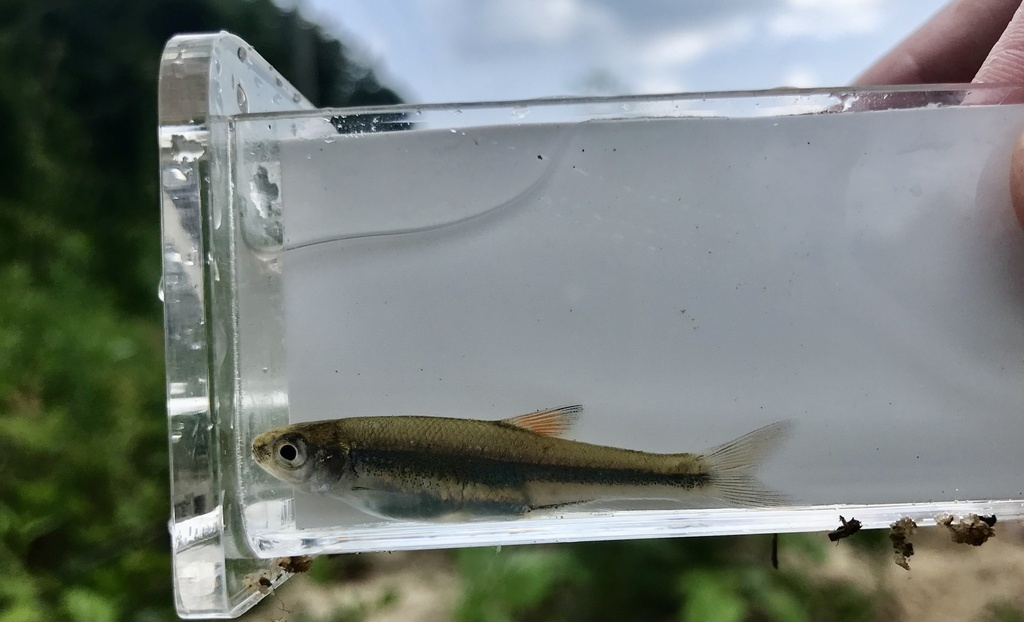

Conservation status
- Least Concern (IUCN 3.1)

Scientific classification
- Kingdom: Animalia
- Phylum: Chordata
- Class: Actinopterygii
- Order: Cypriniformes
- Family: Leuciscidae
- Genus: Lythrurus
- Species: L. atrapiculus

Binomial name
- Lythrurus atrapiculus (Snelson, 1972)

Synonyms
- Notropis (Lythrurus) atrapiculus Snelson, 1972

= Blacktip shiner =

Species of fish

The blacktip shiner (Lythrurus atrapiculus) is a freshwater ray-finned fish belonging to the family Leuciscidae, the shiners, daces and minnows. It is found in the southeastern United States, particularly the Apalachicola, Choctawhatchee, Yellow and Escambia river drainages in western Georgia, southeastern Alabama and Florida. Its preferred habitat is sandy and gravel bottomed pools and runs of headwaters, creeks and small rivers. The Blacktip shiner measures about 6.5 centimeters.
