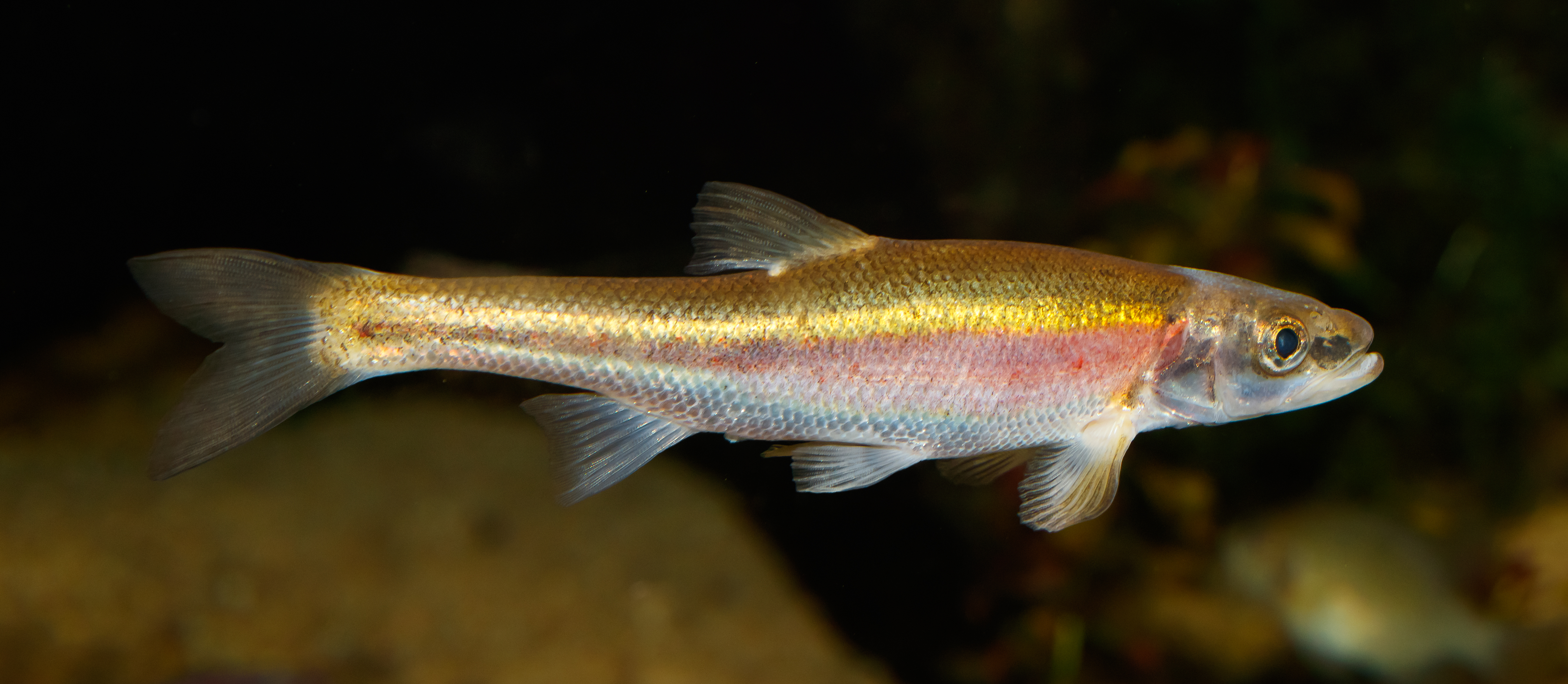
- Clinostomus elongatus

Scientific classification
- Kingdom: Animalia
- Phylum: Chordata
- Class: Actinopterygii
- Order: Cypriniformes
- Family: Leuciscidae
- Subfamily: Pogonichthyinae
- Genus: Clinostomus; Girard, 1856

Type species
- Luxilus elongatus Kirtland, 1840

= Clinostomus =

Genus of fishes

Clinostomus is a genus of freshwater ray-finned fish in the family Leuciscidae, the shiners, daces and minnows. The fishes in this genus are found in North America.

== Species ==
Clinostomus contains the following valid species:

Image	Species	Common name
	Clinostomus elongatus (Kirtland, 1840)	Redside dace
	Clinostomus funduloides Girard, 1856	Rosyside dace
