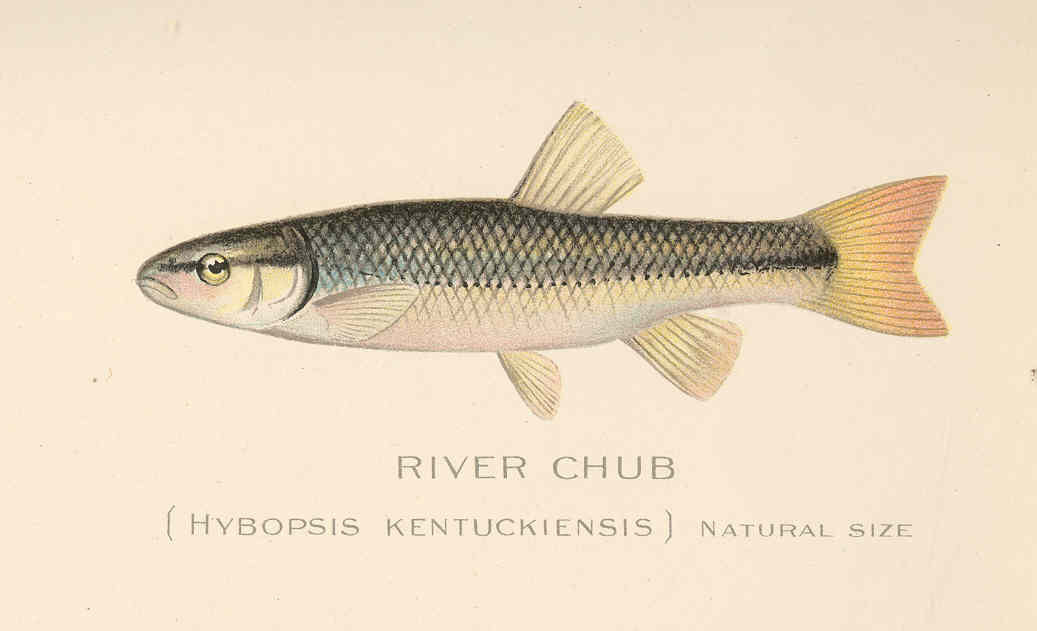
- Nocomis biguttatus

Scientific classification
- Kingdom: Animalia
- Phylum: Chordata
- Class: Actinopterygii
- Order: Cypriniformes
- Family: Leuciscidae
- Subfamily: Pogonichthyinae
- Genus: Nocomis; Girard, 1856

Type species
- Nocomis nebracensis Girard, 1856

Synonyms
- Ceratichthys Baird, 1856

= Nocomis =

Genus of fishes

Nocomis is a genus of freshwater ray-finned fish belonging to the family Leuciscidae, the shiners, daces and minnows. The fishes in this genus are found in North America.

== Species ==
Nocomis contains the following valid species:

- Nocomis asper Lachner & R. E. Jenkins, 1971 (Redspot chub)
- Nocomis biguttatus (Kirtland, 1840) (Hornyhead chub)
- Nocomis effusus Lachner & R. E. Jenkins, 1967 (Redtail chub)
- Nocomis leptocephalus (Girard, 1856) (Bluehead chub)
- Nocomis micropogon (Cope, 1865) (River chub)
- Nocomis platyrhynchus Lachner & R. E. Jenkins, 1971 (Bigmouth chub)
- Nocomis raneyi Lachner & R. E. Jenkins, 1971 (Bull chub)
