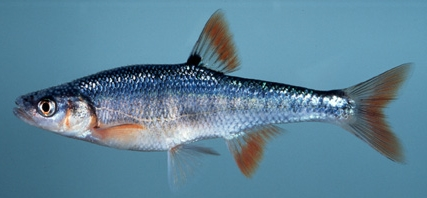

Conservation status
- Least Concern (IUCN 3.1)

Scientific classification
- Kingdom: Animalia
- Phylum: Chordata
- Class: Actinopterygii
- Order: Cypriniformes
- Family: Leuciscidae
- Subfamily: Pogonichthyinae
- Genus: Lythrurus
- Species: L. ardens

Binomial name
- Lythrurus ardens (Cope, 1868)

Synonyms
- Hypsilepis ardens Cope, 1868; Notropis ardens (Cope, 1868)

= Rosefin shiner =

Species of fish

The rosefin shiner (Lythrurus ardens) is a species of fish native to the United States. The fish is omnivorous and lives in freshwater rivers and creeks in Virginia, North Carolina and West Virginia.

== Description ==
The fish has a long and slender body. It also has eight dorsal fin-rays, anywhere from nine to eleven anal fin-rays, thirteen to fourteen pectoral fin-rays and eight pelvic fin-rays. The fish has a dark spot of pigment at the base of its first few dorsal-fins, which distinguishes Lythrurus ardens from similar looking fish in its habitat. In addition, the fish has a stripe that fades as it approaches the dorsa fin and several bands of coloration across the back of the fish.

== Habitat ==
The fish lives throughout Virginia, North Carolina and West Virginia. The range of the fish is believed to have been accidentally increased when it was used as bait and escaped into the natural environment. For example, the fish is believed to have been introduced to the York River in Virginia this way.

It lives in freshwater pools rivers and creeks. The fish prefers clear and turbid water. It is largely absent from streams with trout in them. In winter, the fish tends to live in deeper and less noisy waters.

== Behavior ==
The fish is an omnivore. It consumes chironomids, mayflies, aquatic insects, dipterans, and plants.

The fish reproduces through spawning in fast-moving waters. They tend to stay in these waters until winter. The fish lays eggs during the same time and often the same nest as the longear sunfish. The two fish species work together to defend the nest from predators.

== Conservation status ==
The fish is believed to have a generally stable population. It has a large habitat range and population. In addition, there are no major threats to its survival. Due to these factors, the fish is not believed to be at risk of extinction.
