= Highland stoneroller =

Conservation status
- Least Concern (IUCN 3.1)

- Apparently Secure (NatureServe)

Scientific classification
- Kingdom: Animalia
- Phylum: Chordata
- Class: Actinopterygii
- Order: Cypriniformes
- Family: Leuciscidae
- Subfamily: Pogonichthyinae
- Genus: Campostoma
- Species: C. spadiceum

Binomial name
- Campostoma spadiceum (Girard, 1856)

Synonyms
- Dionda grisea Girard, 1858; Dionda spadicea Girard, 1856

Species of fish

The highland stoneroller (Campostoma spadiceum) is a species of freshwater ray-finned fish in the family Leuciscidae, the shiners, daces and minnows. It is endemic to the United States where it occurs in certain drainages of the Red, Ouachita, and lower Arkansas river basins from eastern Oklahoma to central Arkansas.
