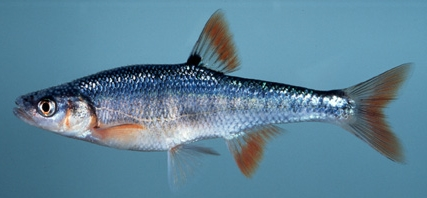
- Rosefin shiner (Lythrurus ardens)

Scientific classification
- Kingdom: Animalia
- Phylum: Chordata
- Class: Actinopterygii
- Order: Cypriniformes
- Family: Leuciscidae
- Subfamily: Pogonichthyinae
- Genus: Lythrurus; D. S. Jordan, 1876

Type species
- see Taxonomy see Taxonomy

Species
- See text

= Lythrurus =

Finescale shiners

Genus of fishes

Lythrurus, the finescale shiners, is a genus of freshwater ray-finned fishes belonging to the family Leuciscidae, the shiners, daces and minnows. The fishes in this genus are found in North America.

== Taxonomy ==
Lythrurus was first proposed as a genus in 1876 by the American ichthyologist David Starr Jordan with Semotilus diplemia as its type species. S. diplemia had been formally described in 1820 by the French polymath Constantine Samuel Rafinesque. However, S. diplemia is now regarded as a synonym of Chrosomus erythrogaster and in 1884 Jordan proposed Notropis lythrurus as the type species, this taxon is a synonym of Notropis umbratilis. If S. diplemia is the type species then Lythrurus is a synonym of Chrosomus and if this taxon is a valid genus then a new name is needed for this taxon. This genus is classified within the subfamily Pogonichthyinae of the family Leuciscidae.

== Species ==
Lythrurus contains the following valid species:

- Lythrurus alegnotus (Snelson, 1972) (warrior shiner)
- Lythrurus ardens (Cope, 1868) (rosefin shiner)
- Lythrurus atrapiculus (Snelson, 1972) (blacktip shiner)
- Lythrurus bellus (O. P. Hay, 1881) (pretty shiner)
- Lythrurus fasciolaris (C. H. Gilbert, 1891) (scarletfin shiner, scarlet shiner)
- Lythrurus fumeus (Evermann, 1892) (ribbon shiner)
- Lythrurus lirus (D. S. Jordan, 1877) (mountain shiner)
- Lythrurus matutinus (Cope, 1870) (pinewoods shiner)
- Lythrurus roseipinnis (O. P. Hay, 1885) (cherryfin shiner)
- Lythrurus snelsoni (H. W. Robison, 1985) (Ouachita shiner)
- Lythrurus umbratilis (Girard, 1856) (redfin shiner)
