= Pretty shiner =

Conservation status
- Least Concern (IUCN 3.1)

Scientific classification
- Kingdom: Animalia
- Phylum: Chordata
- Class: Actinopterygii
- Order: Cypriniformes
- Family: Leuciscidae
- Genus: Lythrurus
- Species: L. bellus

Binomial name
- Lythrurus bellus (O.P. Hay, 1881)

Synonyms
- Minnilus bellus O. P. Hay, 1881; Notropis bellus (O. P. Hay, 1881); Notropis alabamae D. S. Jordan & Meek, 1884

Species of fish

The pretty shiner (Lythrurus bellus) is a freshwater ray-finned fish belonging to the family Leuciscidae, the shiners, daces and minnows. It occurs in the Mobile Bay drainage, and the Tennessee River drainage of the Bear and Yellow Creek systems in Alabama and Mississippi. Its preferred habitat is sandy and clay bottomed pools and runs of headwaters, creeks and small rivers.
