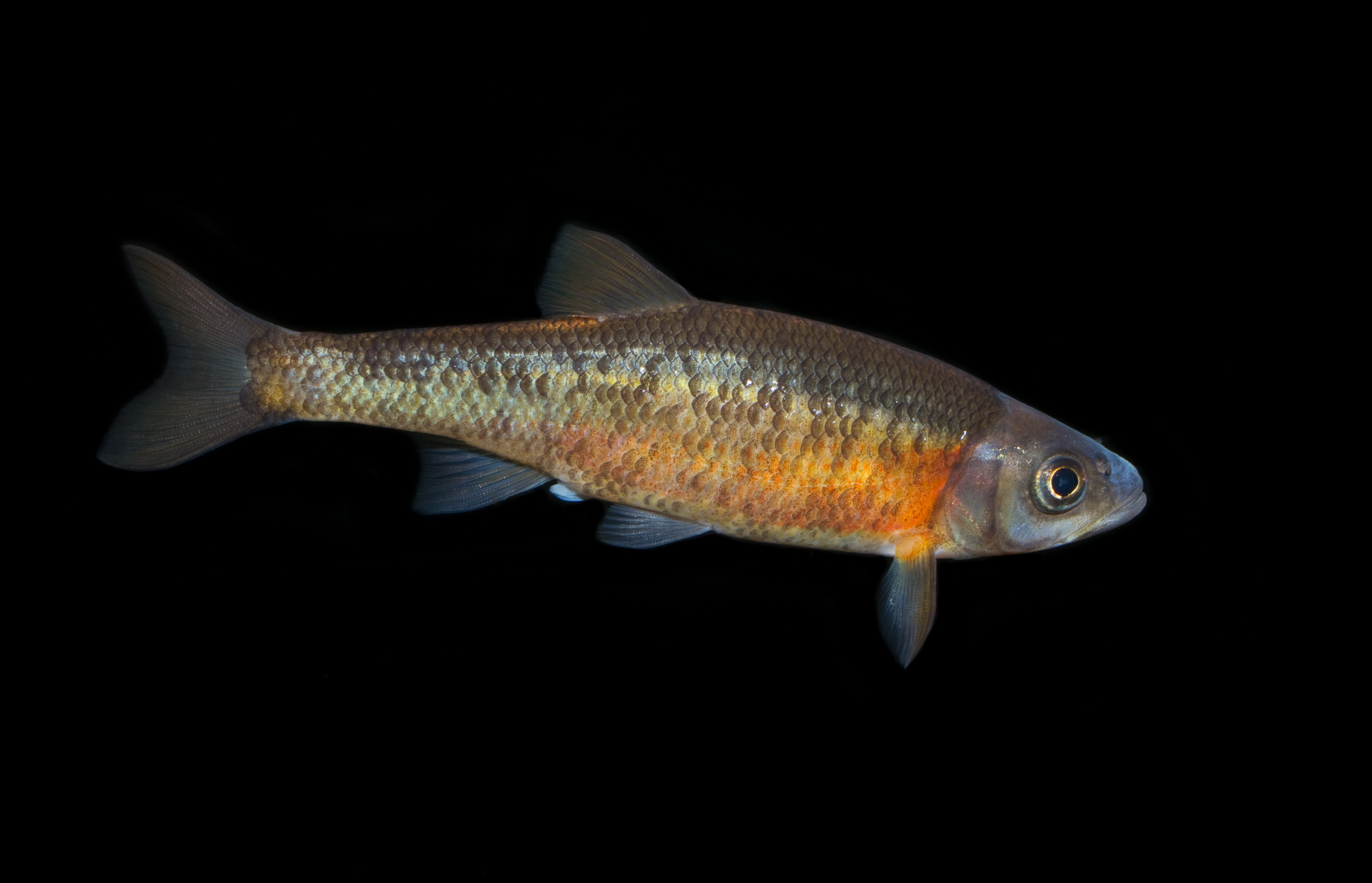

Conservation status
- Least Concern (IUCN 3.1)

Scientific classification
- Kingdom: Animalia
- Phylum: Chordata
- Class: Actinopterygii
- Order: Cypriniformes
- Family: Leuciscidae
- Subfamily: Pogonichthyinae
- Genus: Clinostomus
- Species: C. funduloides

Binomial name
- Clinostomus funduloides Girard, 1856

Synonyms
- Clinostomus affinis Girard, 1856; Clinostomus carolinus Girard, 1856; Gila estor Jordan & Brayton, 1876

= Rosyside dace =

Species of fish

The rosyside dace (Clinostomus funduloides) is a species of freshwater ray-finned fish in the family Leuciscidae, the shiners, daces and minnows. This fish is endemic to the southeastern United States.

This fish is about 11 centimeters long. The lower parts of its sides are red, giving rise to its name, and the upper parts of its sides are dark green.

The rosyside dace is native to parts of the southeastern and eastern United States, including the Delaware River drainage, the Savannah River drainage, and the Ohio River basin. It is thought to have been introduced in western Virginia.

In North Carolina

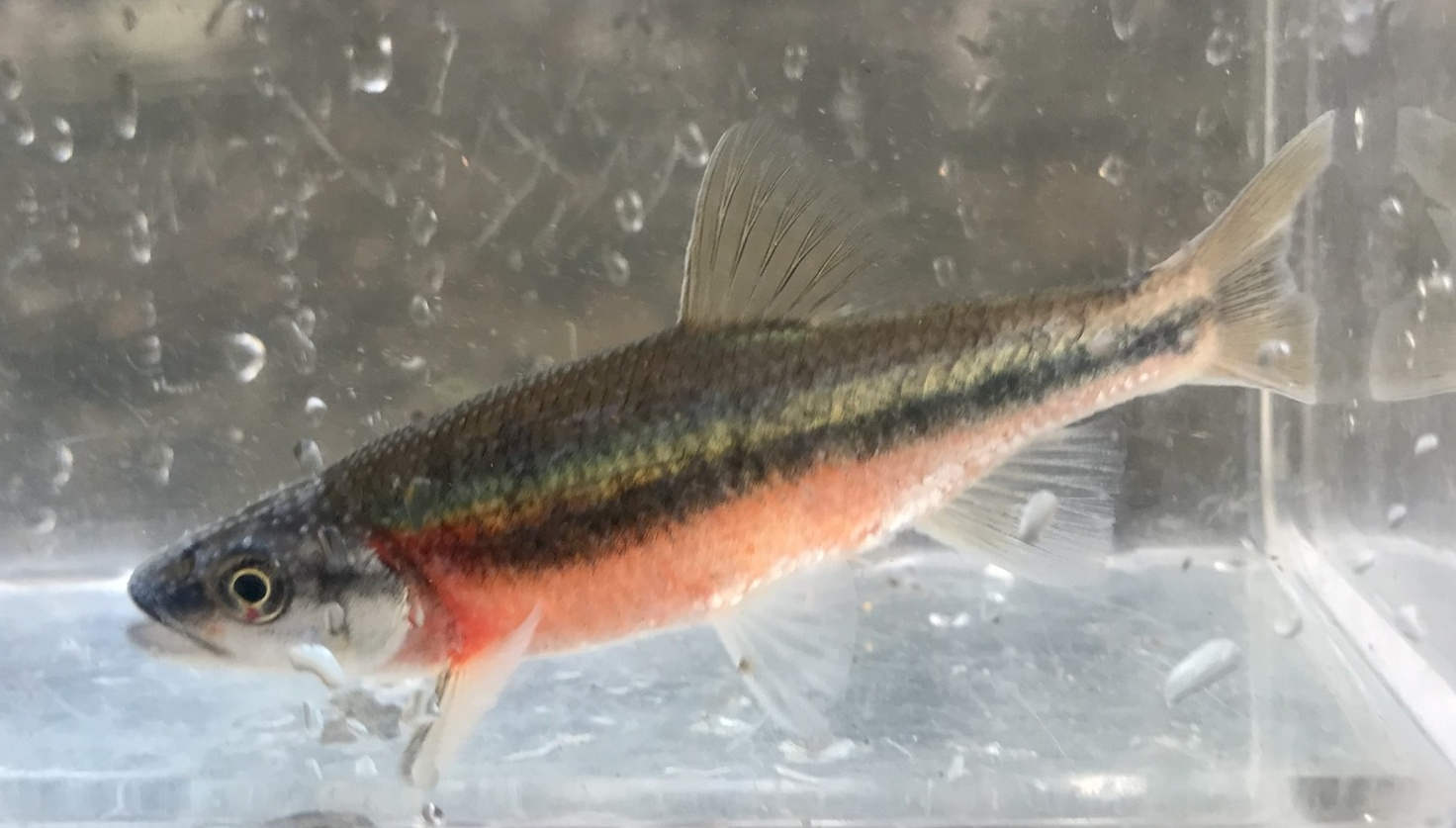
In April

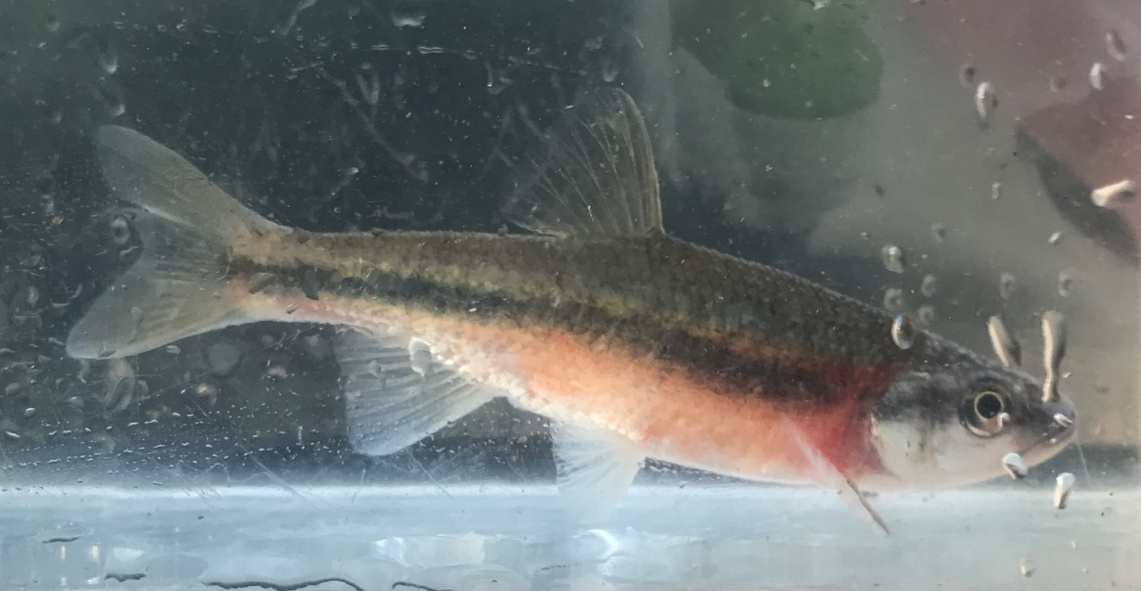
In April

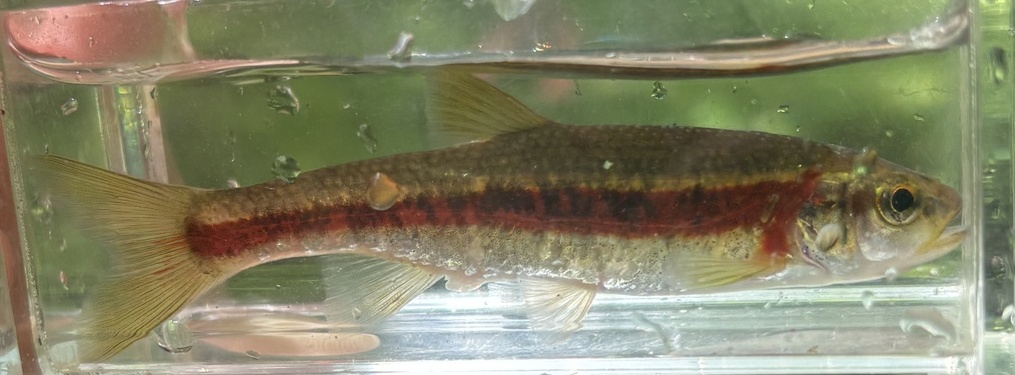
In June

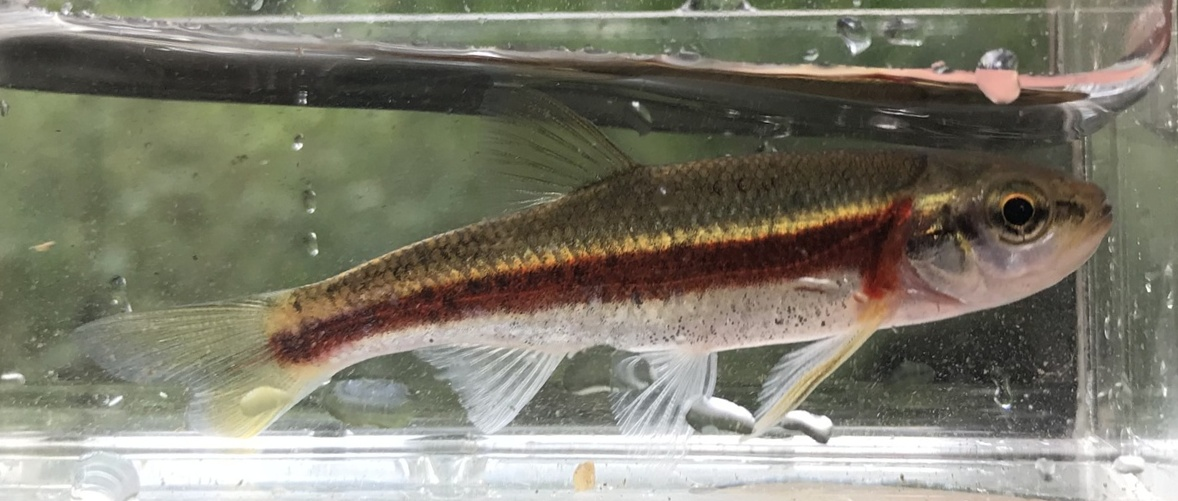
In September
