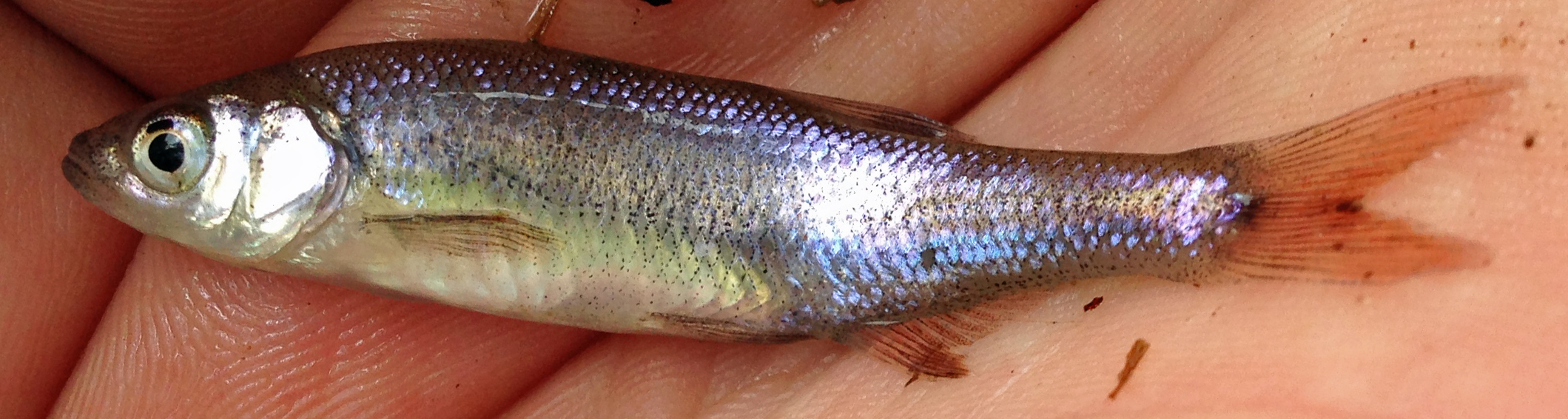

Conservation status
- Least Concern (IUCN 3.1)

Scientific classification
- Kingdom: Animalia
- Phylum: Chordata
- Class: Actinopterygii
- Division: Teleostei
- Order: Cypriniformes
- Family: Leuciscidae
- Subfamily: Pogonichthyinae
- Genus: Lythrurus
- Species: L. umbratilis

Binomial name
- Lythrurus umbratilis (Girard, 1856)

Synonyms
- Alburnus umbratilis Girard, 1856; Notropis umbratilis (Girard, 1856)

= Redfin shiner =

Species of fish

The redfin shiner (Lythrurus umbratilis) is a freshwater ray-finned fish belonging to the family Leuciscidae, the shiners, daces and minnows. The redfin shiner is most commonly found in the Ohio and Mississippi River basins, as well as in drainages of the Great Lakes. The diet of the redfin shiner consists mostly of algae and small insects. This species prefers calm water in low-gradient streams over substrates of gravel or sand with some vegetation.

== Description ==
The average adult redfin shiner is 3.5 inches (8.9 cm) long. The redfin shiner is easily identifiable with its deeply compressed body, large eyes and attractive colors. Its body is a light olive color with a dusky stripe along the spine of the fish. The sides often appear very silvery with a reddish tint in the breeding males.

== Geographic distribution and habitat ==
The redfin shiner occurs in the Great Lakes and their tributaries, as well as in the Mississippi River Basin; and south throughout the Ohio and Mississippi River basins west to Texas. These river systems are considered the geographic range of the species; however, the distribution throughout specific streams is still largely unknown. The species is most prominent in small- to medium-sized streams in a variety of ecological settings. The redfin shiner can be found anywhere from slow moving bays to high-gradient upland streams. The species is generally considered to be a pool dweller, and can potentially be found in any streams in these systems that contains large, slow-moving pools. These slow moving pools are considered their microhabitat since they spend much of their lives in these same relatively small areas. The species prefer pools with a temperature near 20 °C (68 °F) and a neutral pH. They also tend to favor calm water in low-gradient streams over sand or gravel substrates with some vegetation. While redfin shiners prefer calm slow moving pools, they can tolerate some faster moving water.

== Ecology ==
The redfin shiner is a surface feeder, mainly preying on aquatic and terrestrial insects and other small invertebrates but will often feed extensively on algae. The species is not particular on its diet, feeding mostly on whatever is available. The redfin shiner has numerous competitors which it has to outcompete for resources such as food and spawning grounds. In the competition for food, the redfin shiner competes most directly with other members of the genus Lythrurus as well as with numerous other members of the order Cypriniformes. In addition to having numerous competitors, the redfin shiner also has a large number of predators. Predators of this species consist of almost any piscivorous fish species that have a jaw gape large enough to fit the 3.5-inch redfin shiner. Redfin shiners are an important species since they are a significant part of the diet of numerous game fish in the eastern United States. Other predators consist of any mammals, reptiles, and birds that feed on small fish in the areas that the redfin shiner inhabits.

== Life history ==
Redfin shiners reach sexually maturity at the age of two to three years. Most individuals of this species only spawn one summer since the life span of this fish is only three years. Spawning occurs from the beginning of June through the middle of August in shallow sunfish nests. The redfin shiner spawns at the same time and in the same locations as many sunfish species. While redfin shiners and sunfish, most often the green sunfish (Lepomis cyanellus), are able to coexist, they still compete against each other for space on the spawning beds. Redfin shiners and sunfish are able to coexist on these beds made by the sunfish during the spawn. Average clutch size is not known since the species has been studied very little; however, it is expected that their clutch size would be similar to other members of the family Cyprinidae. Redfin shiners' use of sunfish beds is the primary microhabitat used for breeding. Sunfish beds are utilized because they offer a safe silt-free location where eggs can hatch. Sunfish tend to use sand and gravel when making their nests, which facilitates the protection and viability of redfin shiner eggs by concealing them as well as keeping them up out of the silt. Another great advantage to laying eggs in an occupied sunfish nest is that the sunfish are already there protecting their own eggs. The presence of redfin shiners does not seem to bother the sunfish. Since there is a real lack of research on this species, there are no known human induced activities influencing the species' life history.

== Management ==
There are not any current management efforts being enacted for the species. This is because the redfin shiner is believed to be sustaining its populations in most of its native range. There are not any real threats, human induced or otherwise, that have been linked to adversely affecting the species. Due to the fact that populations have sustained in most areas this species is not listed as state or federally endangered in any of its geological range. While there are no large-scale threats to the species, localized threats such as habitat destruction could cause a decline in some tributaries. The only human use for the redfin shiner is as bait in the recreational fishing industry. While the species is sometimes used as bait, it is not among the most common species used as bait.
