= Intermittent river =

River that periodically ceases to flow

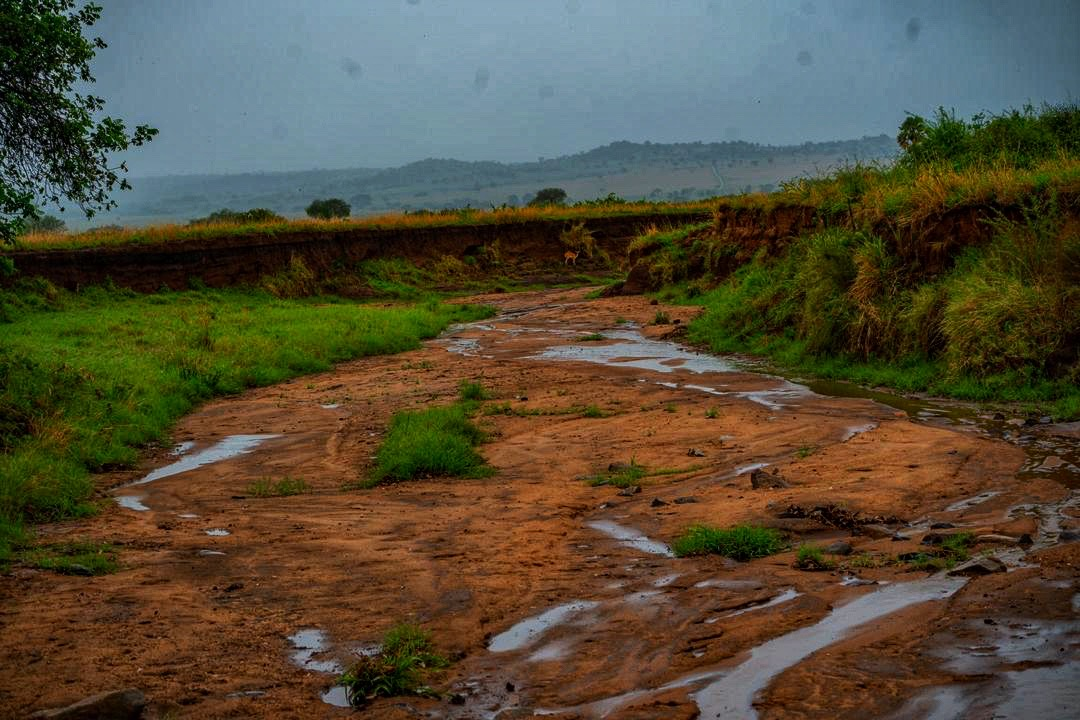
Seasonal river at Kidepo Valley National Park in northeastern Uganda

Intermittent, temporary or seasonal rivers or streams cease to flow every year or at least twice every five years. Such rivers drain large arid and semi-arid areas, covering approximately a third of the Earth's surface. The extent of temporary rivers is increasing, as many formerly perennial rivers are becoming temporary because of increasing water demand, particularly for irrigation. Despite inconsistent water flow, intermittent rivers are considered land-forming agents in arid regions, as they are agents of significant deposition and erosion during flood events. The combination of dry crusted soils and the highly erosive energy of the rain cause sediment resuspension and transport to the coastal areas. They are among the aquatic habitats most altered by human activities. During the summer even under no flow conditions the point sources are still active such as the wastewater effluents, resulting in nutrients and organic pollutants accumulating in the sediment. Sediment operates as a pollution inventory and pollutants are moved to the next basin with the first flush. Their vulnerability is intensified by the conflict between water use demand and aquatic ecosystem conservation. Advanced modelling tools have been developed to better describe intermittent flow dynamic changes such as the tempQsim model.

== US definition ==
According to the U.S. Environmental Protection Agency definition, an intermittent river, or intermittent stream, is any river or stream that only flows during certain times of the year, and may not have any flowing surface water during the dry season.

=== Distinction: intermittent vs ephemeral stream ===
Intermittent rivers do not rely on, but may be supplemented by, stormwaters or other runoff from upstream sources. Their channels are well-defined, as compared to ephemeral streams, which may or may not have a defined channel, and rely mainly on storm runoff, as their aquatic bed is above the water table. An ephemeral stream does not have the biological, hydrological, and physical characteristics of a continuous or intermittent stream.

=== Legal perspective ===
Opinions on the Clean Water Act (CWA) from the Supreme Court have classified intermittent streams as non-jurisdictional and thus outside of legal protection. Prior to 2001, virtually all bodies of water in the United States were considered jurisdictional because of their potential to function as a habitat for migratory birds. Following this 2001 Supreme Court ruling on US waters, Solid Waste Agency of Northern Cook County vs. US Army Corps of Engineers, the court went on to see two cases in 2006 further involving this matter. Rapanos vs. United States and Carabell vs. United States, after being combined into one decision, added new analytical thresholds to be met for protection but ultimately left the determination of what were to be protected U.S. waters up to the EPA, the U.S. Army Corps of Engineers, and further court cases. Recent litigation was brought by eighteen states' attorneys general because of a change to the interpretation of what is to be considered by the EPA and Army Corps of Engineers as "waters of the United States" during May 2020.

== Causes of intermittence ==
Intermittent streams contain water during periods when groundwater levels are above or at the level of stream's channel, allowing for surface flow. The mechanisms which control surface flow of intermittent streams are climatically and geographically specific. For example, intermittent streams fed by snowmelt and glacial meltwater cease to flow when they either freeze or there is not enough inputs to sustain surface water. Streams in more arid regions stop flowing due to the depletion of water storage in the surrounding aquifer and channel banks.

The diversion of water and impoundment for human use, such as for flood control and irrigation storage, have caused intermittency in many rivers that used to be perennial. This was the case for several large rivers such as the Nile, Indus, Yellow, Amu and Syr Darya, Rio Grande, and Colorado, which became intermittent during the past 50 years due to human interference. In arid and semiarid regions of North America, most formerly perennial rivers are now intermittent. This is a direct consequence of the extensive networks of dams and aqueducts that were built for human withdrawal of water that used to flow into wetlands, deltas, and inland sinks. This phenomenon can be observed in the Colorado River, whose flow has decreased significantly since 1905. In recent years, several U.S. states and Mexico have used significant amounts of water for agricultural and urban uses, which caused flows reaching the Colorado River delta to drop to near zero. Effects of climate change such as higher air temperatures are predicted to accelerate drying and cause more intermittency in rivers.

== Distribution ==
Intermittent rivers are found on every continent, and may even be more common than perennial rivers. More than 30% of the total length and discharge of the global river network is estimated to be intermittent rivers. However, due to some low-order streams being difficult to categorize or track, this total could be over 50% when taking those into account. In the face of global climate change, this total is further increasing, as many of the world's rivers that were once perennial are now intermittent in regions suffering from severe climatic drying or water appropriation.

== Types ==
=== Arroyos ===
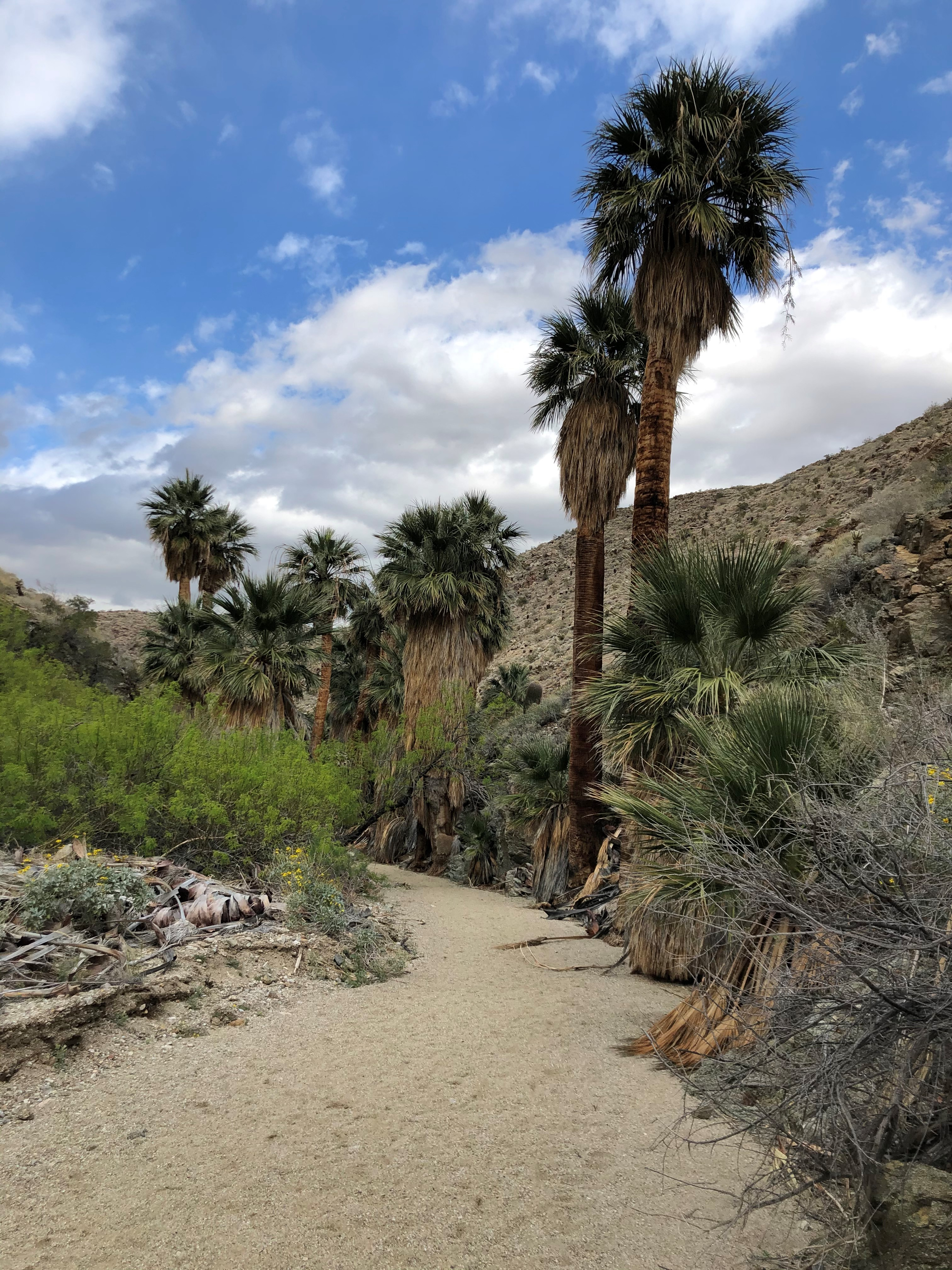
Photograph of a dry arroyo stream bed near Palm Desert, California.

Intermittent streams can be found in many different climate regions. For example, arroyos are intermittent streams that erode deep vertical channels through fine sediment in arid and semiarid regions in the American Southwest during precipitation events. Many incised arroyos that are destructive to stream beds and adjacent man-made structures were formed as a result of drainage channelization and overgrazing during the late nineteenth century along with the influx of American settlers in the Southwestern United States.

=== Glacial streams ===
Glacial streams are considered intermittent streams as the flow intermittence fluctuates with solar energy input. Most glacial streams are alpine headwater streams that receive water from the glacial meltwater. The streams become dry or freeze starting from autumn and last until early spring; the flow of the glacial streams is highest during summer. The intermittency of the glacial streams also fluctuates at different times of the day.

=== Bourne ===
A bourne (Note: Alternative forms are bourn, borne, or born.) is an intermittent stream, flowing from a spring. Frequent in chalk and limestone country where the rock becomes saturated with winter rain, that slowly drains away until the rock becomes dry, when the stream ceases. The term bourne may also be applied to a stream or river that permanently flows.

=== Winterbourne ===
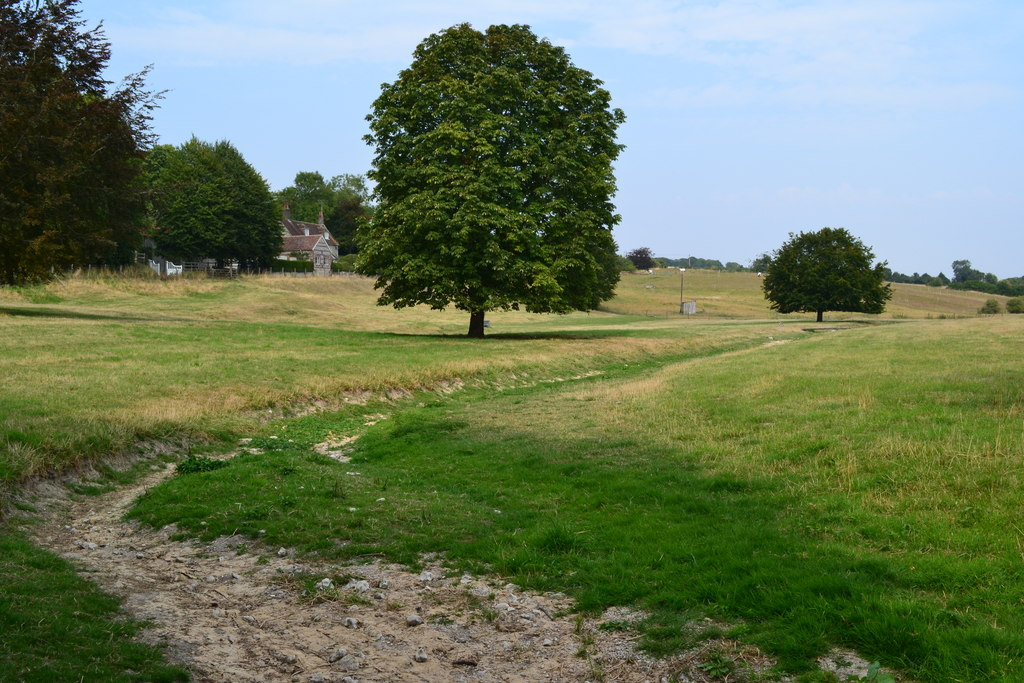
The dry bed of the River Ebble in Wiltshire, pictured in August

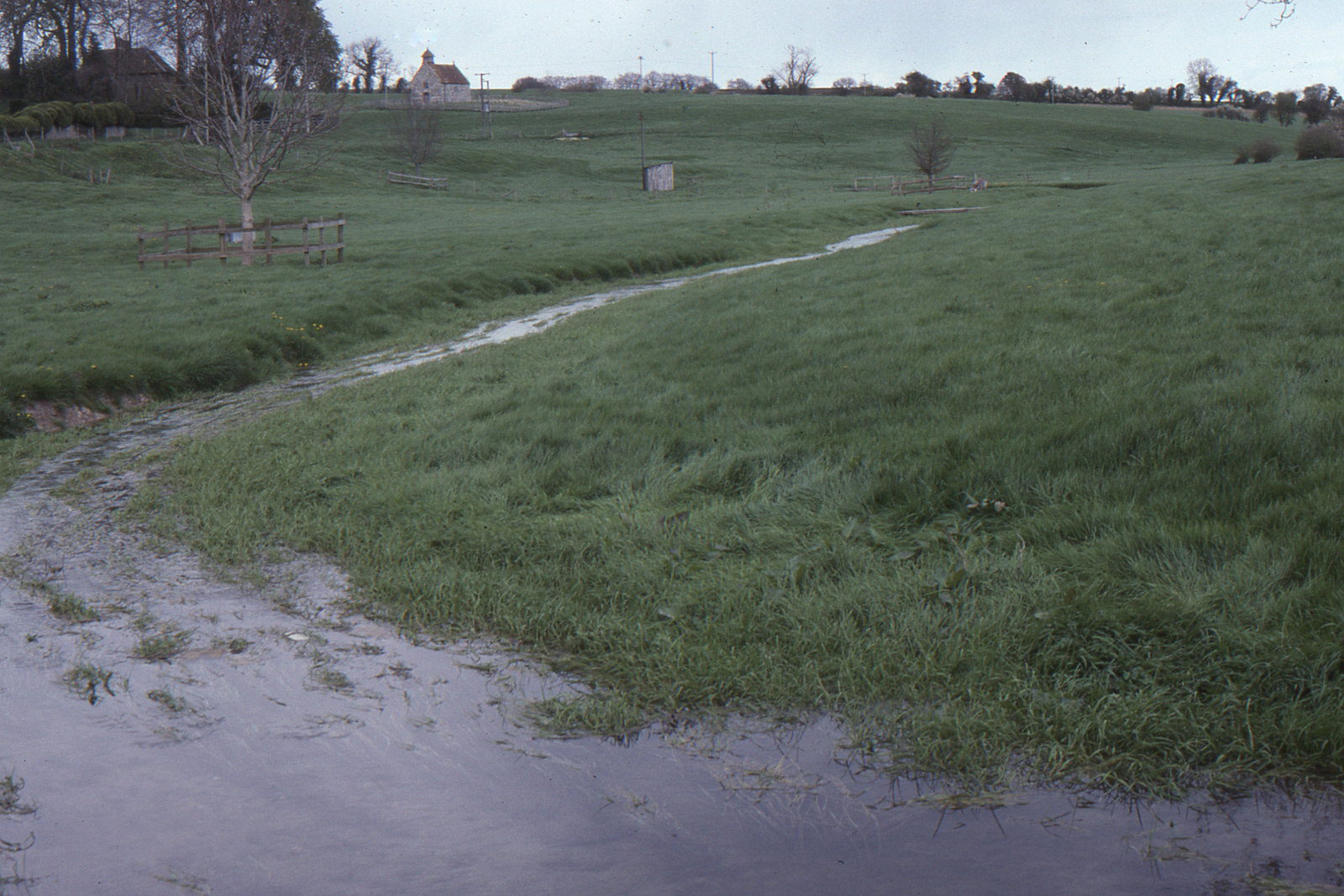
The same location in April

A winterbourne is a kind of intermittent stream fed by an aquifer, primarily chalk aquifers, but occasionally limestone aquifers. The winterbourne flows in the winter, typically from December until approximately April, before declining until the following winter. When it rains, the porous chalk holds water in its aquifer and releases the water at a steady rate. During the dry season, the water table can fall below the level of the stream bed, causing it to dry up. The length of the dry phase depends on the longitudinal position of the stream.

== Ecology ==
The inhabitants of intermittent rivers can change with the water level. As a result of contrasting conditions throughout the year, invertebrate assemblages of the same intermittent stream can be notably distinct from one another. How biodiversity of these habitats changes with conditions has been debated in literature. Current findings suggest that while lotic biodiversity generally decreases with increasing flow intermittence, increased lentic and terrestrial biodiversity during those periods can compensate. Thus, when lotic (flowing water), lentic (lake), and terrestrial communities are considered together, intermittent rivers can account for a high proportion of regional biodiversity. The riparian zone of intermittent rivers can provide habitat and resources for a variety of organisms, and may also be an important source of nutrients for habitats downstream.

=== Wetting front ===
The dry period of intermittent streams is ended by what is called "rewetting" or a wetting front. Rewetting is defined as the resumption of waterflow through the stream. This happens when the gain of the water is higher than the loss of it into the pores of the substrate/soil, also known as infiltration. Rewetting causes changes both in the dissolved nutrients in the stream, and in species compositions.

=== Terrestrial animals ===
During dry periods of intermittent rivers, terrestrial animals can gain access to resources and areas that were otherwise inaccessible, either due to natural or man-made obstructions. Additionally, when drying, these riverbeds often leave behind organisms, such as fish, which were unable to relocate in response to lowering water levels. These organisms are often used as a food source for a variety of terrestrial animals, such as birds, mammals, and reptiles.

=== Types of fish ===
Different types of fishes inhabit intermittent rivers. The Brassy minnow (Hybognathus hankinsoni) is native to the intermittent Niobrara River, Wyoming. Redband trout (Oncorhynchus mykiss gairdneri) is native to intermittent desert streams of southwestern Idaho. The West Fork Smith River provides vital habitat to different species, including coho salmon, returning to spawn in Oregon.

Cobitis shikokuensis (Hina-ishi-dojo) in intermittent rivers move into the hyporheic zone when water flows are low. When the water returns, C. shikokuensis emerge out of the hyporheic zone to recolonize the flowing river system. During stream drying, Campostoma spadiceum (Highland stoneroller) move into pool habitats when riffle areas become too shallow for survival.

=== Food web ===
The food web of intermittent streams differs from perennial streams in that species number and abundance change drastically among the flowing, contraction/fragmentation, and dry phases. Intermittent streams tend to have a food web based heavily on detritus and follow the bottom-up trophic model. Both the ratios of predator to prey and the number of trophic levels depend on the size of the intermittent stream.

== Conservation ==
Intermittent rivers face many threats. Diversion of river water for large-scale consumption, such as industrial use or for farming, can alter the ecology of intermittent rivers. Disturbances caused by humans can result in short-term (pulse) and long-term (press) effects on intermittent stream habitats.

== See also ==
- Wadi

== Sources ==
- Berrie, A.D; Wright, J.F. (1984). Whitton, B.A. (ed.). "The Winterbourne Stream". Ecology of European Rivers. Oxford: Blackwell Scientific Publications: 176–206.
