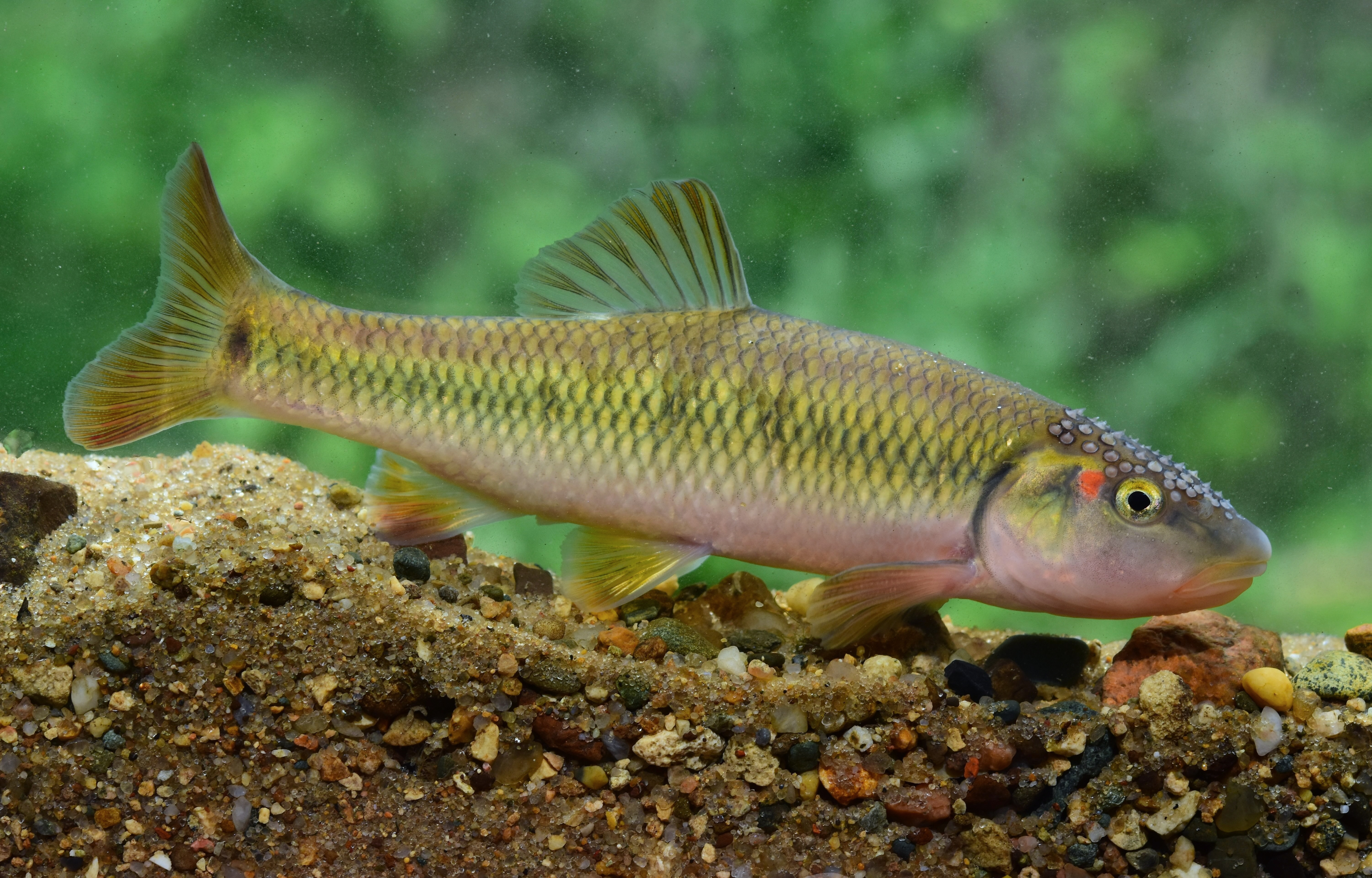

Conservation status
- Least Concern (IUCN 3.1)

Scientific classification
- Kingdom: Animalia
- Phylum: Chordata
- Class: Actinopterygii
- Division: Teleostei
- Order: Cypriniformes
- Family: Leuciscidae
- Subfamily: Pogonichthyinae
- Genus: Nocomis
- Species: N. biguttatus

Binomial name
- Nocomis biguttatus J. P. Kirtland, 1840

Synonyms
- Semotilus biguttatus Kirtland, 1840; Nocomis nebracensis Girard, 1856; Ceratichthys cyclotis Cope, 1865; Ceratichthys stigmaticus Cope, 1865

= Hornyhead chub =

Species of fish

The hornyhead chub (Nocomis biguttatus) is a species of freshwater fish belonging to the family Leuciscidae, the shiners, daces and minnows. It mainly inhabits small rivers and streams of the northern central USA, up into Canada. The adults inhabit faster, rocky pools of rivers.

== Range ==
The hornyhead chub ranges from Wyoming, North Dakota, and South Dakota, east to the Hudson River drainage and south to Oklahoma. In South Dakota, the hornyhead chub is at the western edge of its range. Hornyhead chubs have been found in several water bodies in the Minnesota River Basin including the north and south forks of the Yellowbank River, Monigan Creek, Cobb Creek, Whetstone Creek, the North Fork of Whetstone Creek and Gary Creek in Roberts, Grant and Deuel Counties, as well as in Big Stone Lake in Grant County. In 1952, hornyhead chubs were documented to occur in the Big Sioux River drainage, but the exact location is unknown. The hornyhead chub has not been documented in the Big Sioux River drainage since the finding in 1952, and is likely extirpated from this watershed. They are also found in the Mississippi River basin, Red River drainage, Ohio River and lower Kentucky River systems. They can be found from New York west into the Dakotas with isolated populations in the Platte and Colorado River Systems, and north from Manitoba and south into Kentucky. There are hornyhead chubs in Georgia below Chattahoochee Forest National Fish Hatchery on Rock Creek and Toccoa River in Suches, GA.

== Description ==
The Hornyhead chub is moderate in size and slightly subterminal with an inconspicuous barbel in corner of mouth. This fish has no teeth. A body pattern of a back olive brown in color, with its sides having silvery color, and a belly of white. It also has a dark lateral stripe and a spot at the base of the tail, which is faint or absent in some adults. Fins contain decorative markings. Its body shape is fusiform and robust, round in cross-section. Typical adult size is 100–150 mm (3.9–5.9 in) TL, with a maximum of about 225 mm (8.9 in). It has a forked tail and a single relatively short dorsal fin with 8 rays and without spines. Its pelvic fins are abdominal and has no adipose fin. Lastly, its anal fin with 7 rays has no spines. Its distinguishing characteristics are its moderately slightly subterminal mouth, and its defining inconspicuous barbel in the corner of its mouth. It also uniquely has 38–48 lateral line scales and a dark lateral stripe and caudal spot. Breeding adults have numerous large pointed tubercles on the top of their heads, smaller tubercles on their pectoral fins and a red or orange spot on the upper opercle behind their eyes. Juveniles look similar to adults, but have more obvious lateral stripes and caudal spots, and their tails are typically more reddish than the adult's tail.

== Habitat ==
The hornyhead chub is found in rocky pools and runs of creeks and small to medium-sized rivers. The hornyhead chub inhabits riffle/pool sections of small streams to medium-sized rivers. Although they are occasionally found in dark-water streams, they are more commonly found in clear-water streams. Presence is inversely related to turbidity. Vegetation does not necessarily have an effect on abundance of adults, however, the young use vegetation extensively for cover and are found in higher concentrations in these areas, at least for the first several weeks to one month of life. This species is commonly found in water depths of 2–6 ft (61–183 cm).

== Life history and reproduction ==
Hornyhead chubs spawn from May through June. They become sexually mature at 2 to 3 years of age. Males build a cup shaped depression that they build up with pebbles that can be as large as 1–3 feet (0.30–0.91 m) across and 6–8 inches (150–200 mm) high. Eggs and sperm are deposited in depressions in the nests and covered with gravel. Males defend the nest mounds from other N. biguttatus males but not other species. Other species take advantage of this defense and spawn in the nest mounds. The result of this is sometimes accidental hybridization. The same male may spawn with several females.

== Diet ==
The hornyhead chub is a visual feeder that is active primarily during daylight. A variety of plant and animal food items are commonly reported for hornyhead chubs. Animal food items for the young include: rotifers, cladocerans, copepods, chironomids, and aquatic insect larvae. Older hornyhead chubs are known to consume: clams, snails, crayfish, worms, aquatic insect larvae, and fish.

== Importance to humans ==
Due to the fact that smallmouth bass, northern pike, and rock bass are thought to prey on the hornyhead chub, this type of minnow is often used as bait during fishing expeditions.

== Conservation status ==
Globally, the status of the hornyhead chub is secure, but it is considered Critically Imperiled in Wyoming, Kansas, and Pennsylvania, and Possibly or Presumed Extirpated in Colorado and Nebraska. Currently, The Nature Conservancy has assigned the hornyhead chub a national ranking of G5 suggesting that the species' existence is globally secure and of least concern (LC).

== Etymology of name ==
Etymology: Nocomis: An indigenous (North America) name used by Charles Girard; ojibwe, nokomis = grandmother. Actinopterygii (ray-finned fishes) > Cypriniformes (Carps) > Cyprinidae (Minnows or carps) > Leuciscinae.
