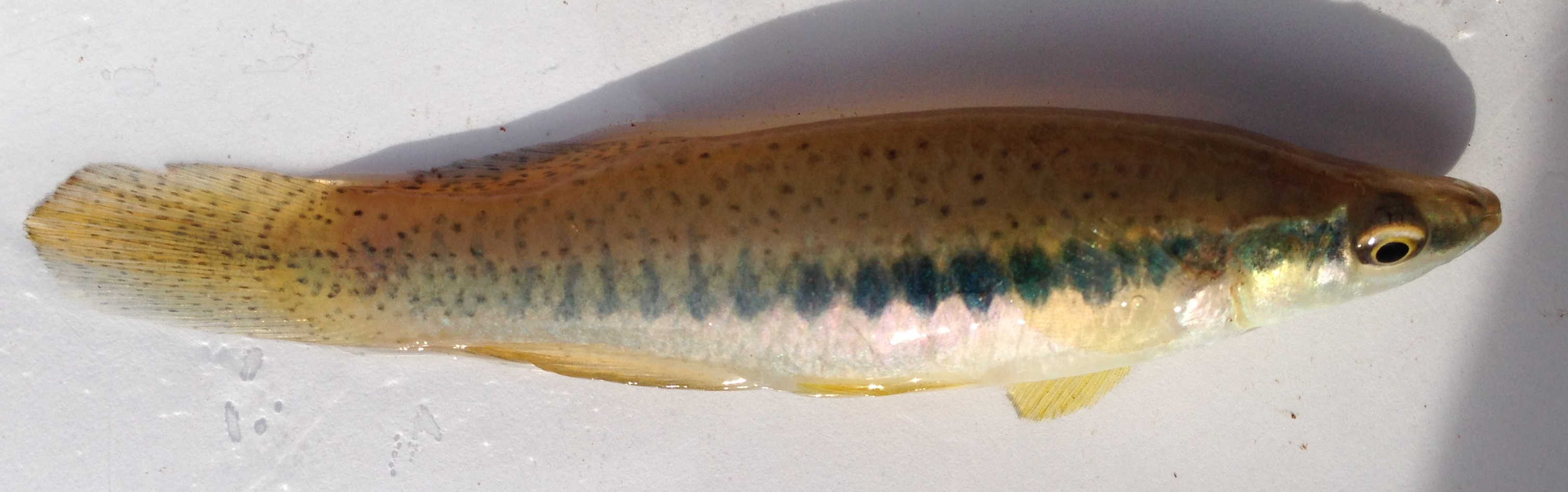

Conservation status
- Least Concern (IUCN 3.1)

Scientific classification
- Kingdom: Animalia
- Phylum: Chordata
- Class: Actinopterygii
- Order: Cyprinodontiformes
- Family: Fundulidae
- Genus: Fundulus
- Species: F. olivaceus

Binomial name
- Fundulus olivaceus (D. H. Storer, 1845)

Synonyms
- Poecilia olivacea Storer, 1845; Zygonectes lateralis Agassiz, 1854; Fundulus lateralis (Agassiz, 1854); Zygonectes pulchellus Girard, 1859; Fundulus pulchellus (Girard, 1859); Fundulus balboae Fowler, 1916

= Fundulus olivaceus =

Species of fish

The blackspotted topminnow, Fundulus olivaceus, is a species of fish in the family Fundulidae: the topminnows and North American killifishes. It is native to the south-central United States, where it is known from the drainages of the Mississippi River from Illinois to the Gulf of Mexico and as far west as Galveston Bay.

This species lives in clear streams with fast currents and sand or gravel substrates. It can often be found near the thick vegetation along the banks of the streams. It is omnivorous, consuming some plant matter along with a main diet of insects and other arthropods.

== Description ==
The blackspotted topminnow has an elongate body up to 9.7 centimetres (3.8 in) long. It is brownish yellow to olive green on its upper side and has a wide, dark lateral band and distinct dark spots. The male has longer fins than the female and the fins of the male may take on a yellowish color during breeding. This species is very similar to the blackstripe topminnow (Fundulus notatus), which also has a dark lateral band. It can be distinguished from F. notatus by its darker, more numerous spots. The two may hybridize. In Fundulus olivaceus, the gill slit extends the dorsal to the uppermost pectoral fin ray. The distance from the origin of the dorsal fin to the end of the hypural plate is less than the distance from the origin of the dorsal fin to the preopercle or occasionally about equal to that distance. The mouth is sightly supraterminal.

== Diet ==
The blackspotted topminnow eats various arthropods and algae.

== Habitat ==
This species occurs near the surface in quiet or flowing, relatively clear, sand-gravel bottom headwaters, creeks, and small rivers; often occurring along margins near thick stands of emergent vegetation.

== Reproduction and life cycle ==
Spawning season for the blackspotted topminnow stretches from March to early September, with peak spawning occurring in May. On occasion, large males have been observed keeping an open territory of three square meters, Males seldom tolerate females in the wild, except during morning or evening spawning activities. In the aquarium, however, thus fish loses its wild traits, and becomes less aggressive. When spawning approaches, though, the males start to reveal their wild, aggressive traits. The males will approach each other head-on, and exhibit flaring opercula and gular areas—very similar to cichlid or betta behavior. They will then begin to slap and bite each other's flanks until one backs down. Ripe eggs are an average of 2.14 mm in diameter. The outer egg membrane has filaments that tend to be restricted to one area forming a tuft. The eggs hatch in 10–14 days while the fish lives for about 3 years.

== Distribution ==
Range of the blackspotted topminnow includes the Gulf Slope, from Galveston Bay drainage, Texas, east to Choctawhatchee River system, Florida, and middle Chattahoochee River drainage, Georgia; Mississippi River basin from the Gulf to southeastern Kansas, central Missouri, southern Illinois, western Kentucky, and eastern Tennessee.

== Etymology ==
The scientific name of the blackspotted topminnow can be broken down in order to understand its meaning. The genus name Fundulus, is from the Latin name Fundus, meaning "bottom". The species name olivaceus means "olive-colored".
