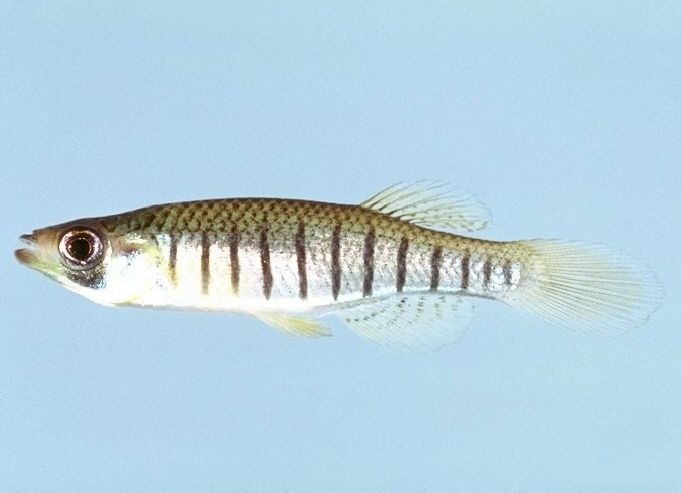

Conservation status
- Least Concern (IUCN 3.1)

Scientific classification
- Kingdom: Animalia
- Phylum: Chordata
- Class: Actinopterygii
- Order: Cyprinodontiformes
- Family: Fundulidae
- Genus: Fundulus
- Species: F. lineolatus

Binomial name
- Fundulus lineolatus (Agassiz, 1854)

Synonyms
- Zygonectes lineolatus Agassiz, 1854

= Lined topminnow =

Species of fish

The lined topminnow (Fundulus lineolatus) is a small fish in the genus Fundulus which is found in swamps and backwaters from southern Virginia to Lake Okeechobee.

== Description ==
Fundulus is the Latin word for "bottom" and lineolatus is Latin for "having lines".

The fish is silver with black bars and spots, with one of these black bars located underneath the eye, resembling a tear. These bars are only on a minority of the females. The "teardrop" underneath the eye is so prominent that it can be used to tell this species apart from all other topminnows. Some adults are known to have orange and red around their mouths. The maximum size of the topminnow is 1 1/2 inches.

It was once believed that Fundulus lineolatus was a subspecies of Fundulus notti, the bayou topminnow. The species resembles the least killifish, which has a dark bar and spots, but has its anus located in its throat region. It also resembles the eastern mudminnow and the mosquitofish.

The sperm and eggs are released into the water in spring and summer, the eggs of the line topminnow being 1.6 mm. While swimming close to the water's surface, the species eat vegetation, crustaceans, and larvae. The northern water snake preys on this fish, as well as another species from the genus, the blackstripe topminnow.

== Habitat ==
The fishes' habitats are streams, rivers with a small amount of currents or no currents, ponds, and swamps. Swamps include the Okefenokee Swamp. The species is so common and easy to capture that fishermen frequently use them as fishing bait.

In 1999, a study by the journal Copeia reported that there may be a correlation between the dams of beavers and how close the fishes' habitat are to these dams.
