= Cow Bayou =

Bayou in Texas

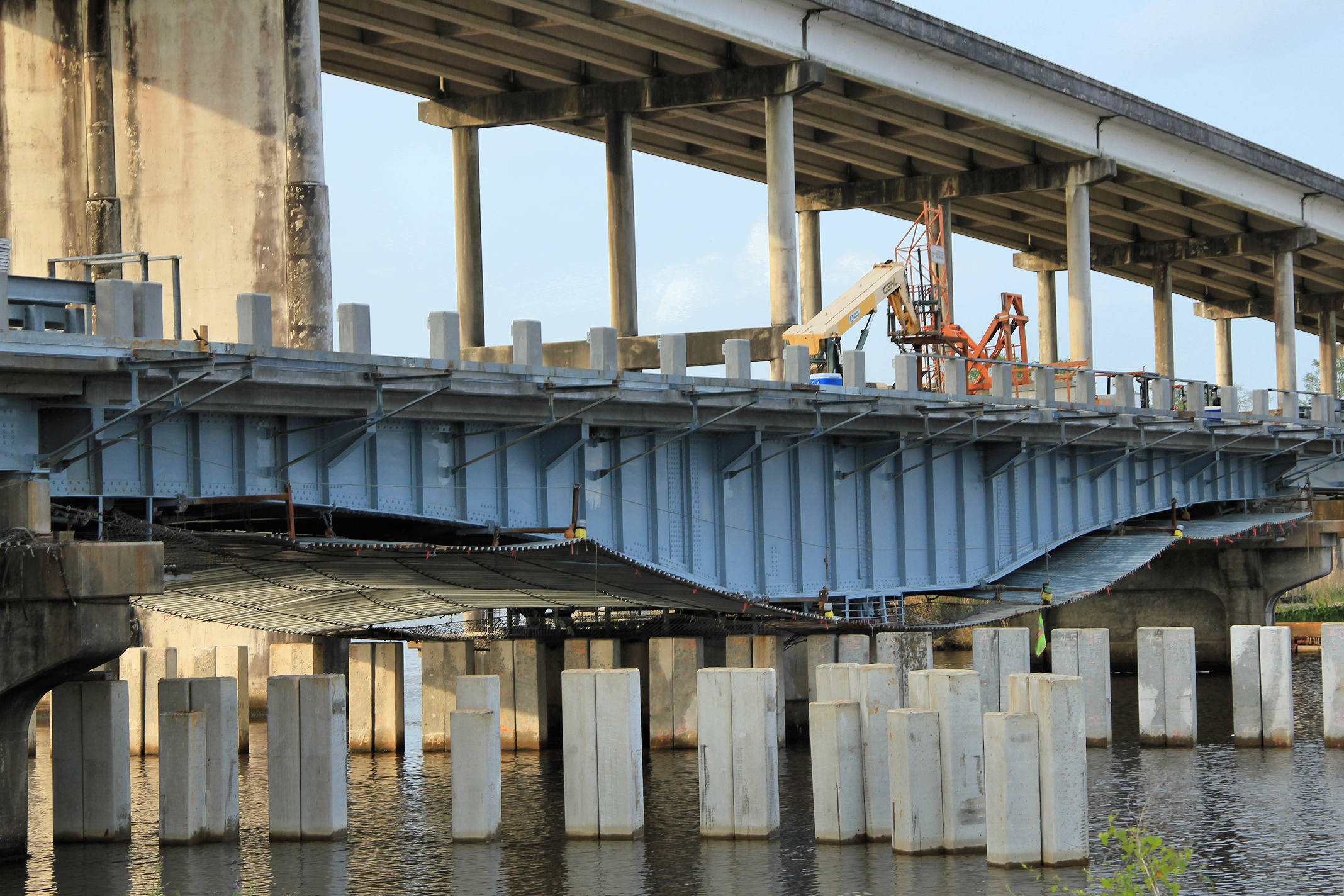
- A bridge that crosses the Cow Bayou
- Map

Location
- Country: United States
- State: Texas
- District: Orange County; Jasper County

Physical characteristics
- Mouth: Sabine River
  - coordinates: 30°01′19″N 93°44′43″W
- Length: 30 mi (48 km)

Cow Bayou is a bayou in Orange County and Jasper County in the U.S. state of Texas. It was formed by the Gum Slough and Dognash Gully. The bayou runs through the cities of Buna, Mauriceville Vidor, and Bridge City. There are 3 tributaries of the Cow Bayou, which includes Cole Creek, Terry Gully, and Coon Bayou.

== History ==
In the early 1910s, the bayou was formed by rice farmers. Rice production skyrocketed and by 1911 almost all farmers in Orange County were using the bayou. In 1940 the Cow Bayou Swing Bridge was created, the bridge was the last major component constructed along Texas State Highway 87. The bridge is 806 feet long and has 2 lanes. In 1963 Congress improved the bayou by constructing a channel 100 feet wide and thirteen feet deep for 7.7 miles from its mouth to Orangefield. It wasn't till 1967 when the project came into effect since oil wells were blocking the construction plan.

Fleash-eating bacteria was found on September 17, 2022, when a resident went into the water. This is the first case of flesh eating bacteria in Orange County. Officials have been warning residents about the flesh eating bacteria since the attack.

== Wildlife ==
Marine mammals:

- West Indian manatee (very common)
- Bottlenose dolphin (common)
- Bull shark (common)
- Hammerhead shark (very rarely)
- Blacktip shark (common)
- American alligator (very rare)
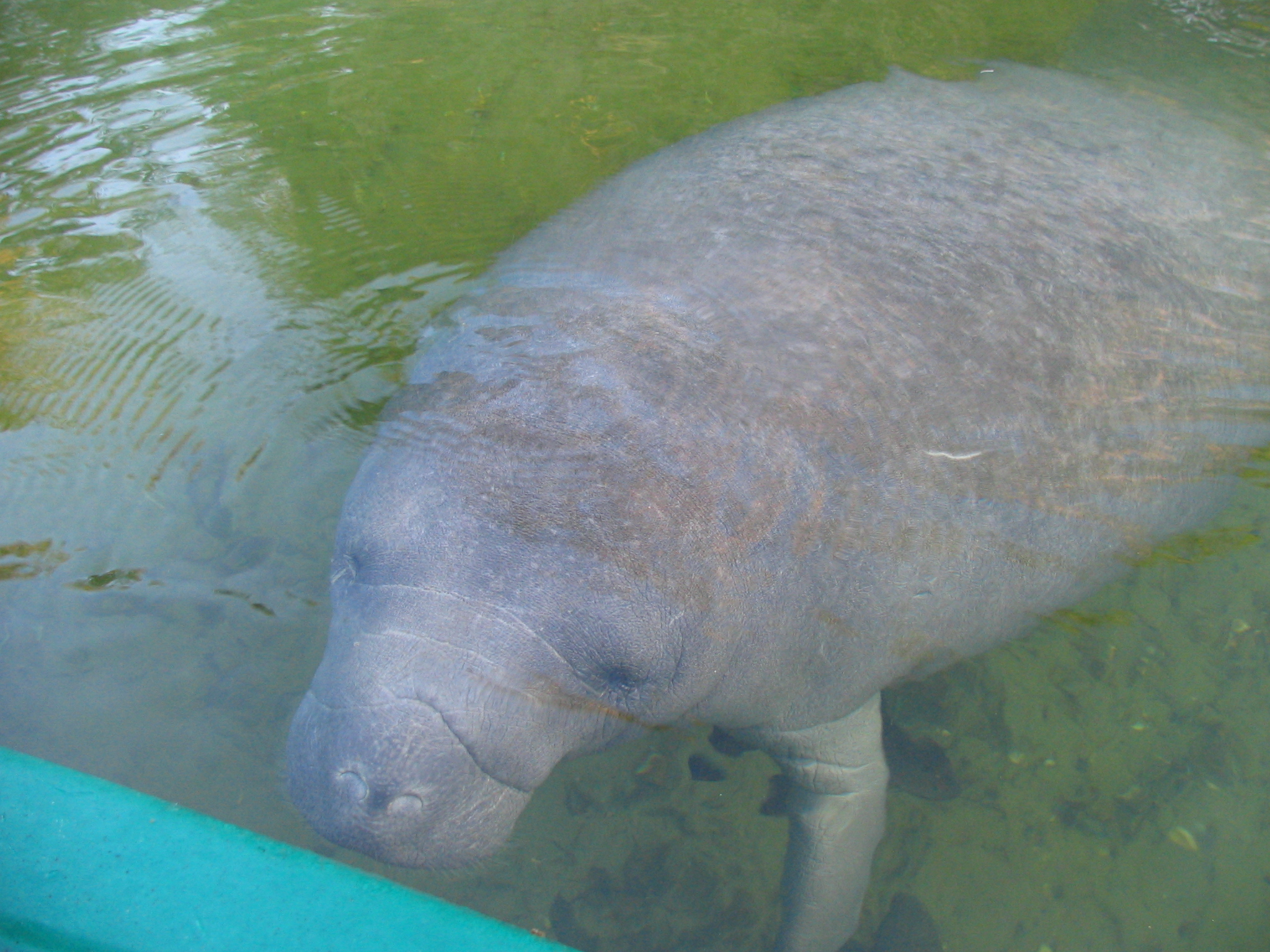
West Indian manatee

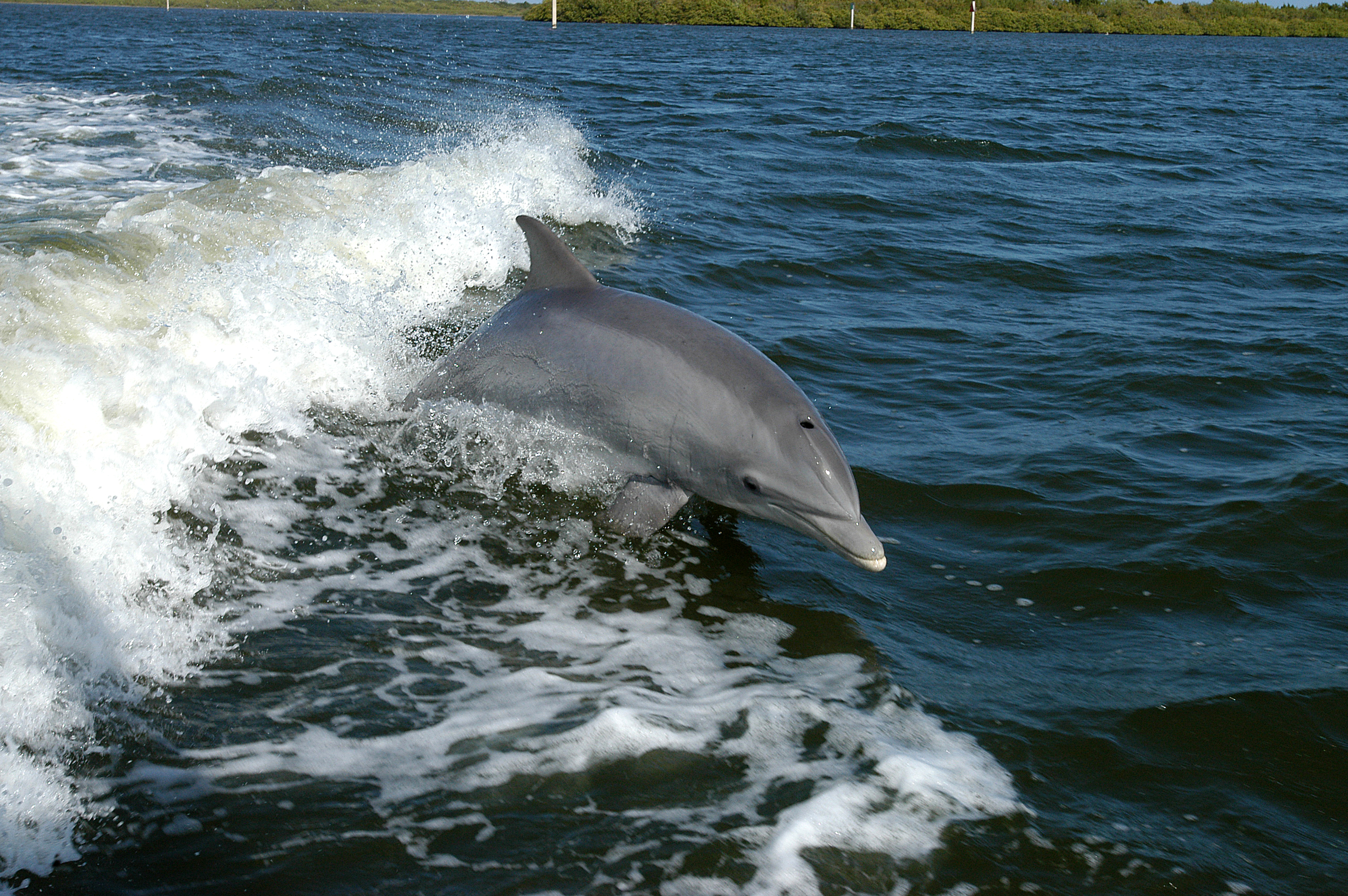
Bottlenose dolphin

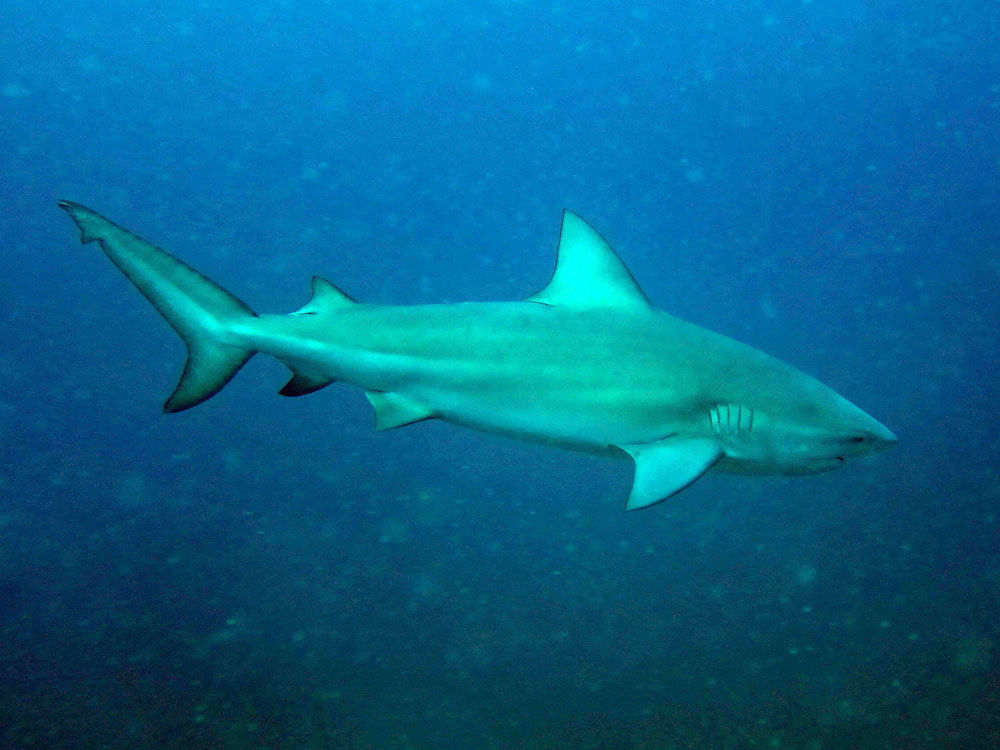
Bull shark

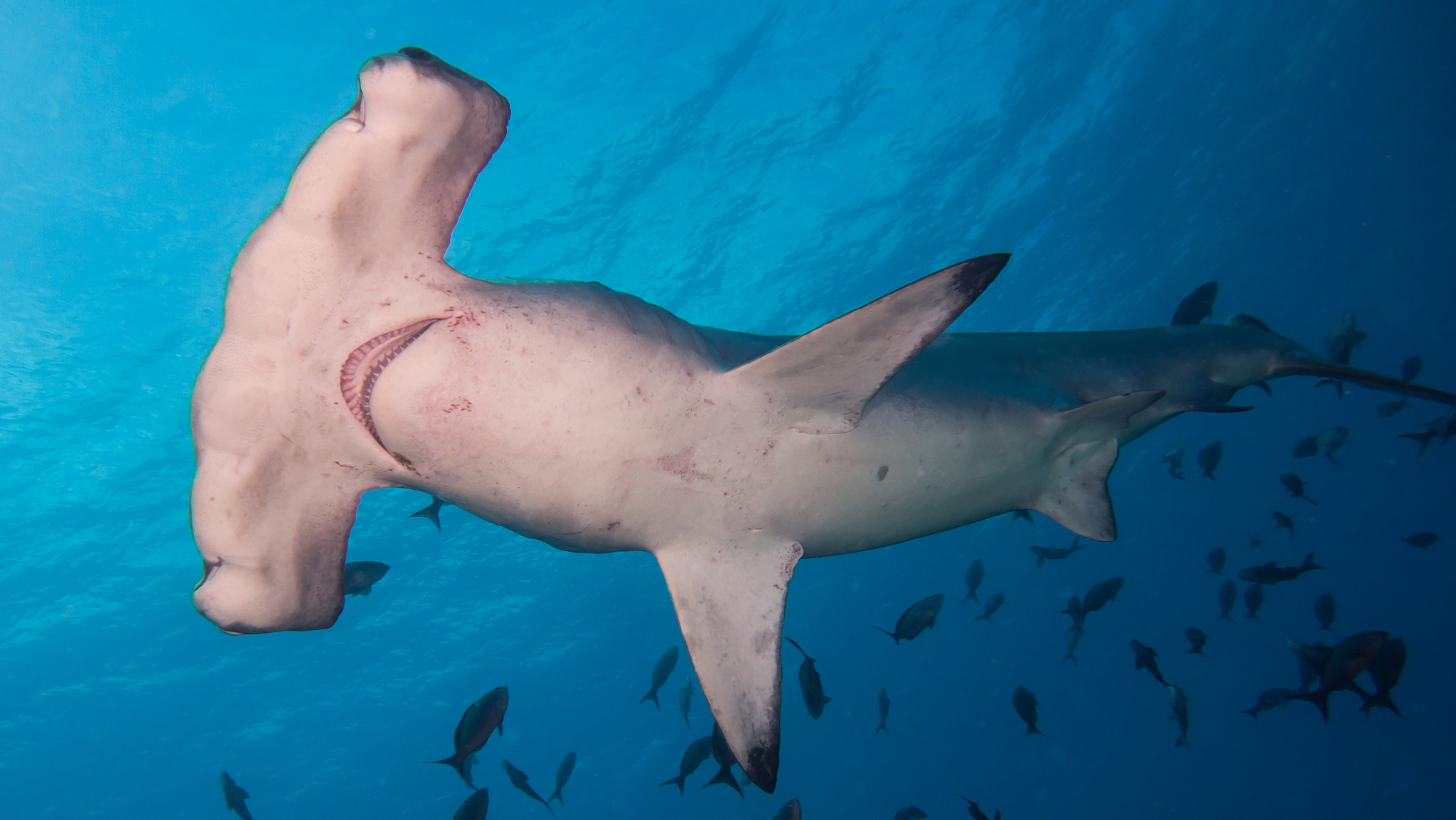
Hammerhead shark

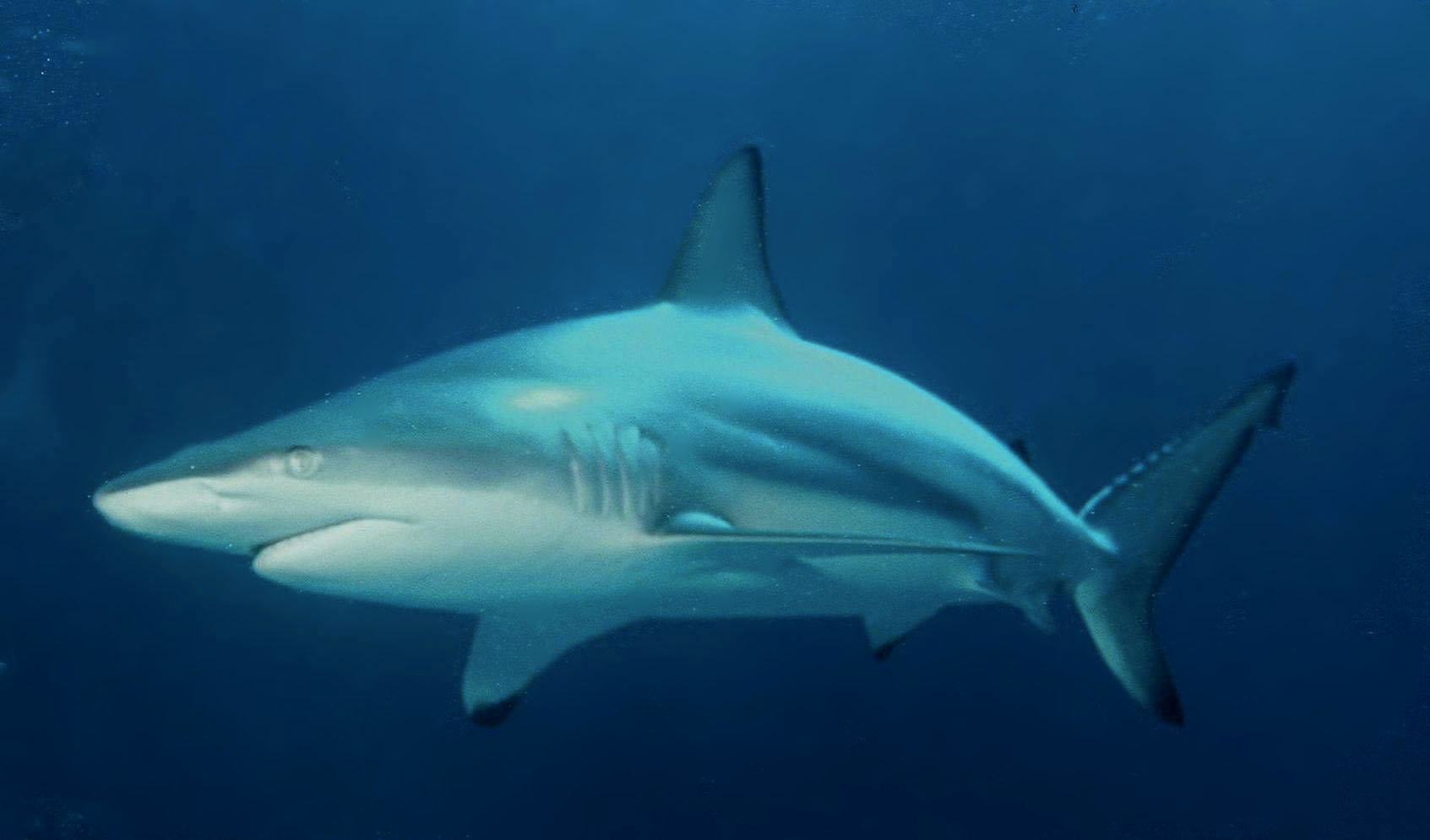
Blacktip shark

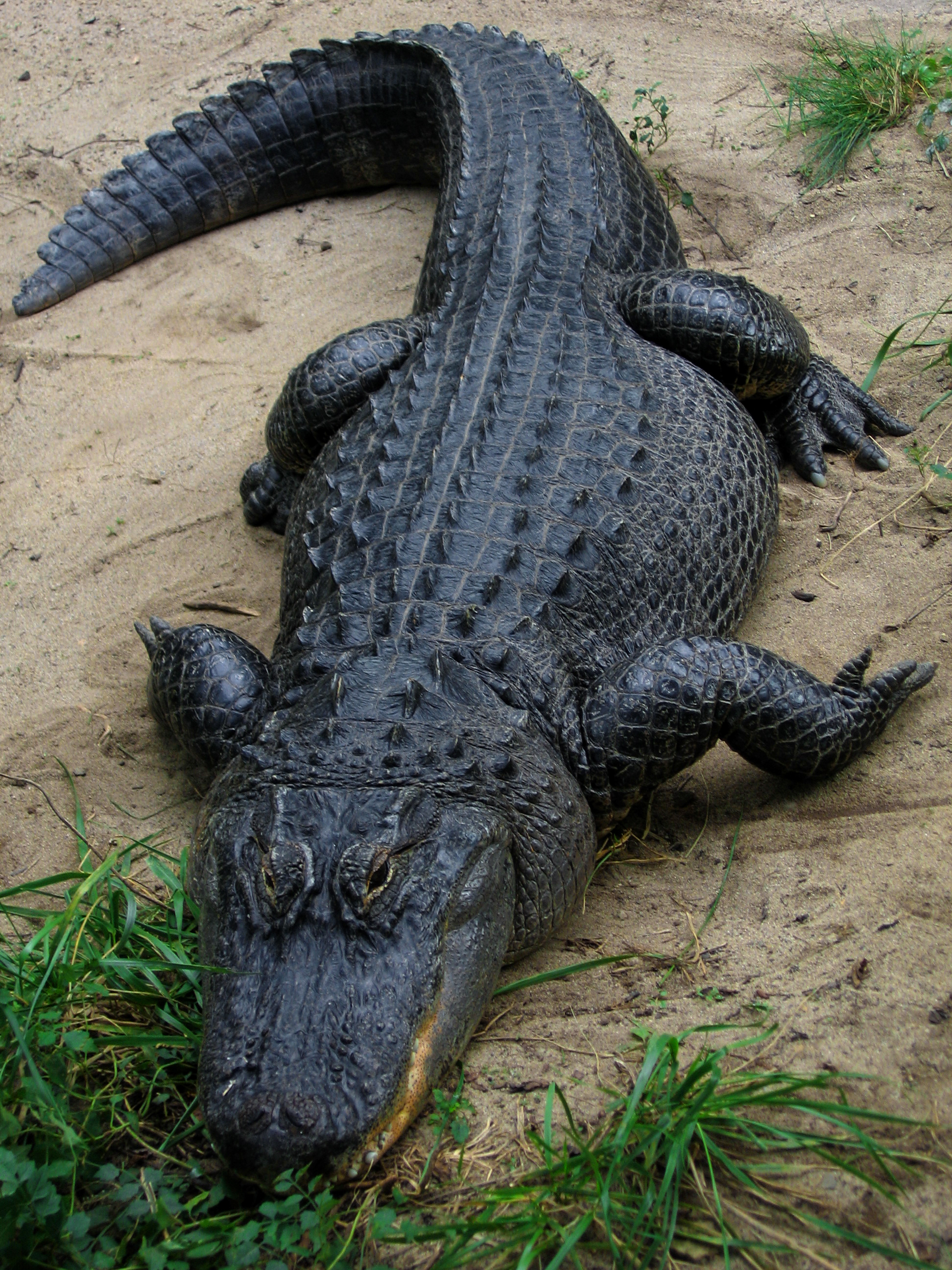
American alligator

Smaller fish species:

Taxa
Taxa	Common name	Taxa	Common name	Taxa	Common name
Anchoa mitchilli	Bay anchovy	Gobinellus boleosoma	Darter goby	Microgobius gulosus	Clown goby
Fundulus blairae	Blair's starhead topminnow	Gobiosoma bosc	Naked goby	Mugil cephalus	Striped mullet
Brevoortia patronus	Gulf menhaden	Leiostomus xanthurus	Spot	Notropis emiliae	Pugnose minnow
Citharichthys spilopterus	Bay whiff	Lepomis macrochirus	Bluegill sunfish	Percina sciera	Dusky darter
Etheostoma chlorosomum	Bluntnose darter	Lepomis microlophus	Redear sunfish	Pimephales vigilax	Bullhead minnow
Fundulus chrysotus	Golden topminnow	Lepomis punctatus	Spotted sunfish	Syngnathus scovelli	Gulf pipefish
Fundulus grandis	Gulf killifish	Lepomis	Sunfish		
Fundulus notatus	Blackstripe topminnow	Lucania parva	Rainwater killifish		
Gambusia affinis	Mosquitofish	Menidia beryllina	Tidewater silverside		

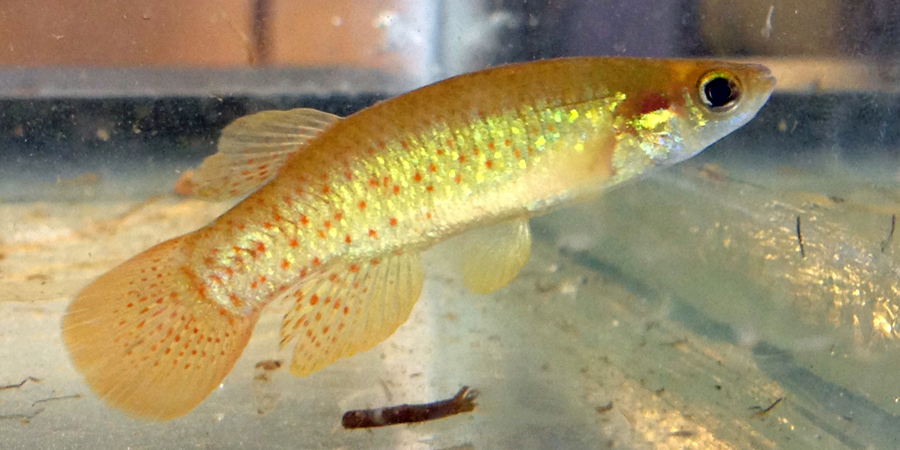
Golden topminnow, Fundulus chrysotus, Mississippi

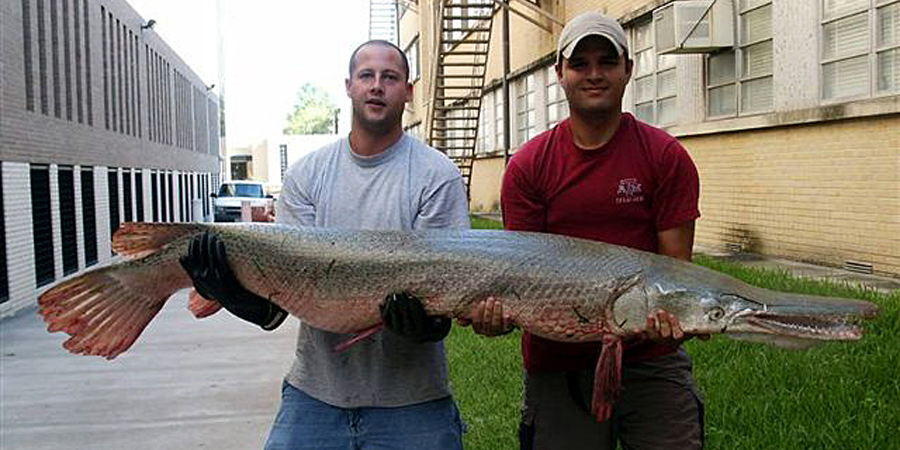
Alligator gar, Atractosteus spatula, Brazos River system

Big fish species:

Taxa
Taxa	Common name	Taxa	Common name	Taxa	Common name
Aplodinotus grunniens	Freshwater drum	Dorosoma cepedianum	Gizzard shad	Ictalurus furcatus	Blue catfish
Ictalurus punctatus	Channel catfish	Ictiobus bubalus	Smallmouth buffalo	Lepisosteus oculatus	Spotted gar
Lepisosteus spatula	Alligator gar	Micropogon undulatus	Croaker	Micropterus salmoides	Largemouth bass
Minytrema melanops	Spotted sucker	Morone mississippiensis	Yellow bass	Mugil cephalus	Striped mullet
Paralichthys lethostigma	Southern flounder	Pomoxis annularis	White crappie	Pomoxis nigromaculatus	Black crappie
Strongylura marina	Atlantic needlefish	Oncorhynchus mykiss	Rainbow trout	Sciaenops ocellatus	Red drum
Pogonias cromis	Black drum	Herichthys cyanoguttatus	Yellow bullhead		
Oreochromis niloticus	Nile tilapia	Archosargus probatocephalus	Sheepshead		
Ameiurus melas	Black bullhead	Ariopsis felis	Hardhead catfish		

== See also ==
- List of rivers in Texas
