= Bayou topminnow =

Bayou topminnow is a common name for several fishes and may refer to:

- Fundulus nottii
- Fundulus pulvereus
