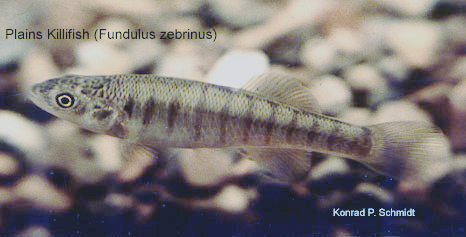

Conservation status
- Least Concern (IUCN 3.1)

- Secure (NatureServe)

Scientific classification
- Kingdom: Animalia
- Phylum: Chordata
- Class: Actinopterygii
- Order: Cyprinodontiformes
- Family: Fundulidae
- Genus: Fundulus
- Species: F. zebrinus

Binomial name
- Fundulus zebrinus Jordan & Gilbert, 1883

Synonyms
- Plancterus zebrinus (Jordan & Gilbert, 1883); Hydrargyra zebra Girard, 1859; Fundulus zebra (Girard, 1859); Fundulus adinia Jordan & Gilbert, 1883

= Fundulus zebrinus =

Species of fish

Fundulus zebrinus is a species of fish in the Fundulidae known by the common name plains killifish. It is native to North America, where it is distributed throughout the Mississippi River, Colorado River, and Rio Grande drainages, and other river systems; many of its occurrences represent introduced populations.

== Description ==
This fish grows up to about 6.9 cm (2.7 in), with a maximum length of 8–10 cm (3.1–3.9 in). Its lifespan is up to 3 years, but most fish do not exceed two. It has a flat head with a protruding jaw that allows it to feed at the water's surface. It is variable in color, being brown, black, greenish, or straw-colored, with paler yellowish or silvery coloration on the belly. The fish is striped with the 12 to 28 dark vertical bars that give the species its scientific name, meaning "like a zebra". The males have wider, darker bars than the females. The breeding male develops bright orange coloration on most of his fins.

This species feeds on chironomid larvae, copepods, nematodes, and other small animals. It is also herbivorous. It may feed by scooping up and swallowing mouthfuls of riverbed substrate to obtain buried food objects. The fish often spits out most of the sand and undigestible material, but the digestive tract usually contains an amount of sand. The fish eats mosquito larvae when available, and studies suggest it might be useful in mosquito abatement efforts.

The fish lives in a number of shallow river and stream habitat types. It may occur in lower, moderate and swift, turbid water flows. It may be found in lakes. It is tolerant of brackish, alkaline, and salty water, more so than most other local fish species. It may bury itself in the substrate with only its eyes and mouth showing. The fish might perform this behavior as a stress response, and it might serve to protect it from sunlight and heat, predators, or low water levels, or to help rid itself of parasites. The killifish may face predation by other fish, notably the green sunfish (Lepomis cyanellus); where this predator occurs, killifish populations drop.

Spawning is associated with water temperature, usually occurring when the temperature exceeds 26 °C (79 °F). Spawning season has been noted to start in April and continue through August.

A number of parasites have been observed on this species, including Myxosoma funduli, a myxozoan, a species of Trichodina, a protozoan, Urocleidus fundulus, a fluke, and Gyrodactylus bulbacanthus, a monogenean, all of which infest the gills. Also, the parasite Gyrodactylus stableri infests the fins and organisms of Neascus, a genus of flukes, infest the eye and internal tissues of the fish. The monogenean gill parasite Salsuginus thalkeni was first described from the fish.

For a long time, fish of the closely related species Fundulus kansae were considered to be members of F. zebrinus, the names being synonyms. F. kansae was sometimes considered a subspecies of F. zebrinus. Molecular and genetic studies supported the separation of the species. F. zebrinus is slightly larger than F. kansae, with larger scales and larger eyes. The fins of the breeding male become more red in color, whereas the male F. kansae develops a more yellow-orange fin color.

== Distribution ==
This species has a wide range, mostly in the central United States. Its native range is mostly within the Great Plains. It includes much of the Mississippi River drainage, parts of the Colorado and Brazos Rivers, and some areas in the Rio Grande region, especially the Pecos River. Its distribution was influenced by Pleistocene changes in the geography of the local river systems, such as glaciation. Many occurrences of the fish represent introductions, such as populations at Lake Powell in Arizona and Utah, the Fort Peck Reservoir in Montana, and several tributaries of the Colorado River in Colorado, Utah, and Nevada. Some occurrences may or may not be native. Fish introductions began in earnest around the 1930s. Most introductions occurred when plains killifish were used as bait by anglers and escaped into the wild to establish new populations.
