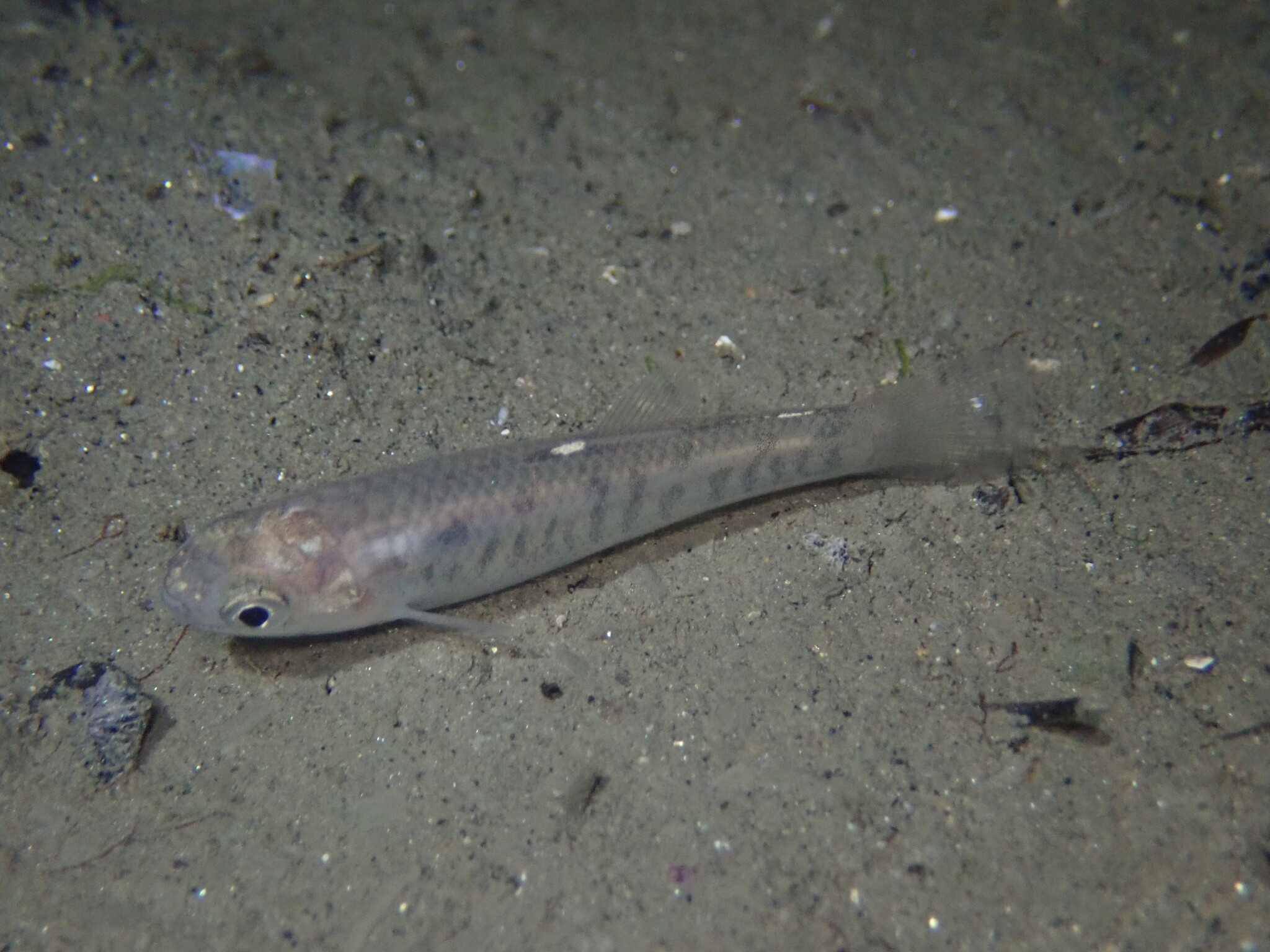

Conservation status
- Least Concern (IUCN 3.1)

Scientific classification
- Kingdom: Animalia
- Phylum: Chordata
- Class: Actinopterygii
- Order: Cyprinodontiformes
- Family: Fundulidae
- Genus: Fundulus
- Species: F. parvipinnis

Binomial name
- Fundulus parvipinnis Girard, 1854

Synonyms
- Fundulus brevis Osburn & Nichols, 1916

= California killifish =

Species of fish

The California killifish (Fundulus parvipinnis) is a type of killifish (Fundulidae) found along the coast of southern California and the Baja California Peninsula.

Like the other members of the family, California killifish are small, no more than about 11 centimetres (4.3 in) in length. The body is rather thick and oblong in shape, with almost no narrowing of the caudal peduncle, and a squarish tail fin. The pelvic fins are small, while the anal fin is long, with 11 to 13 rays. They are olive-green above, and a yellowish brown below; during breeding season, the back become dark brown, while the belly and paired fins become bright yellow.

They are coastal fish, occurring in shallow bays, estuaries, marshes, and the lower parts of streams from Morro Bay south to Magdalena Bay in central Baja California Sur. Between Goleta Slough and the Tijuana River they occur almost continuously, the frequency of wetlands being sufficient to allow free movement. They tolerate a wide range of salinities, oxygen levels, and pollution.

The diet consists of a variety of both benthic and planktonic invertebrates, anything from snails to crustaceans to insects, often found by foraging through areas of vegetation flooded by high tides.

This species and the Baja California killifish F. lima are the only members of Fundulus on the west coast of the continent, and are distinct from the rest of the genus, which is limited to the east coast. It has been suggested that they may form a separate genus.
