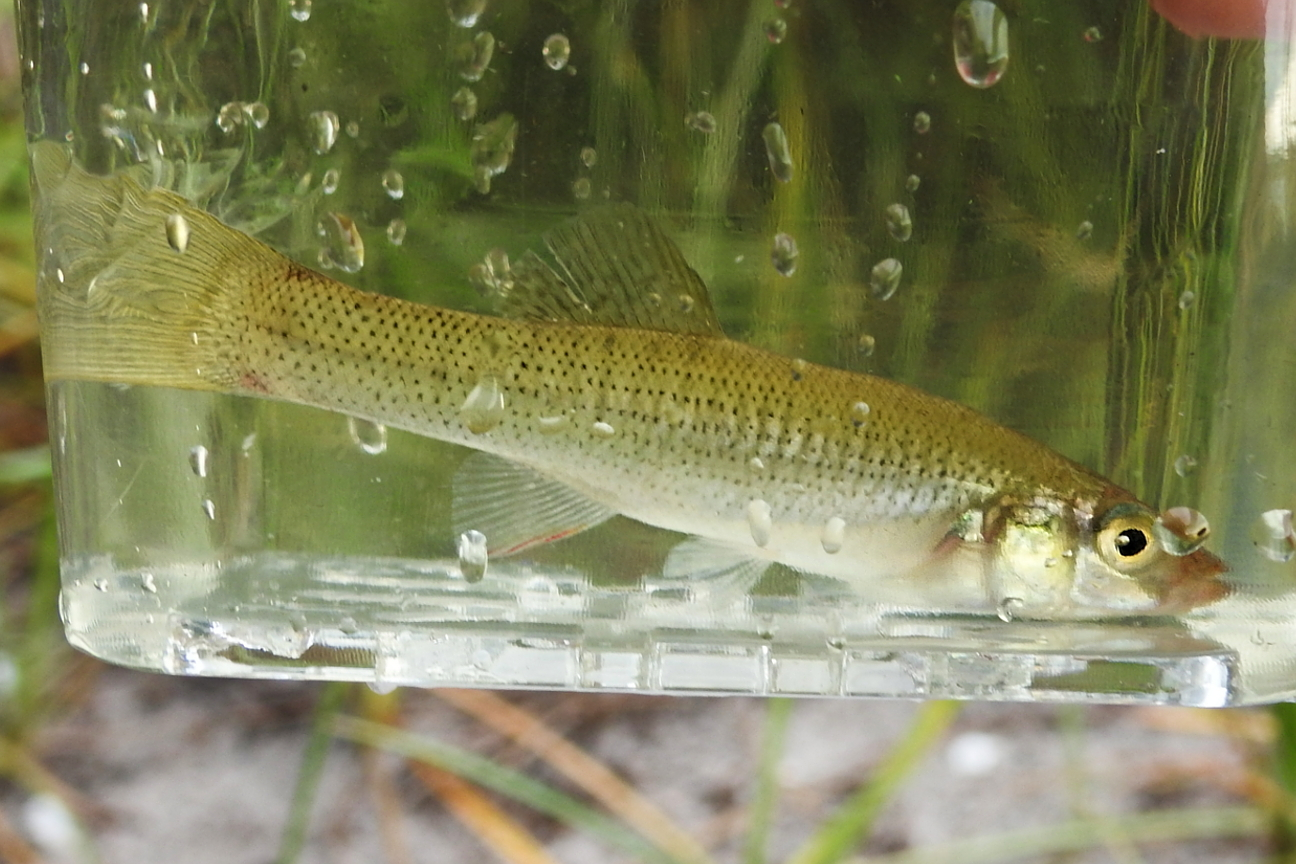

Conservation status
- Least Concern (IUCN 3.1)

Scientific classification
- Kingdom: Animalia
- Phylum: Chordata
- Class: Actinopterygii
- Order: Cyprinodontiformes
- Family: Fundulidae
- Genus: Fundulus
- Species: F. seminolis

Binomial name
- Fundulus seminolis Girard, 1859

= Seminole killifish =

Species of fish

The Seminole killifish (Fundulus seminolis) is a fish of the genus Fundulus, endemic to the U.S. state of Florida.

== Geographic distribution ==
The Seminole killifish ranges throughout much of peninsular Florida from the St. Johns and New river drainages south to the Everglades.

== Biology ==
The Seminole killifish occurs in open areas of lakes and quiet pools in streams. The juveniles are usually encountered in schools in the vicinity of vegetation.

== Taxonomy and name ==
Fundulus seminolis was described by Charles Frédéric Girard in 1859 with the type locality given as Palatka in eastern Florida. The specific name probably alludes to the Seminole people who are indigenous to southern Florida where this species is endemic.

== Gallery ==
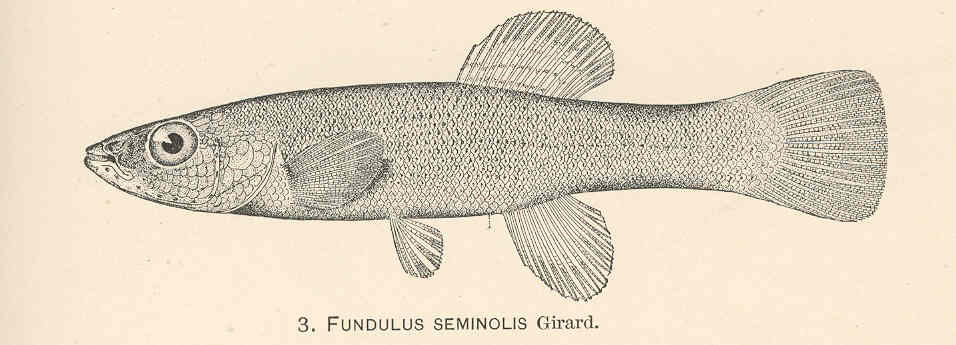
