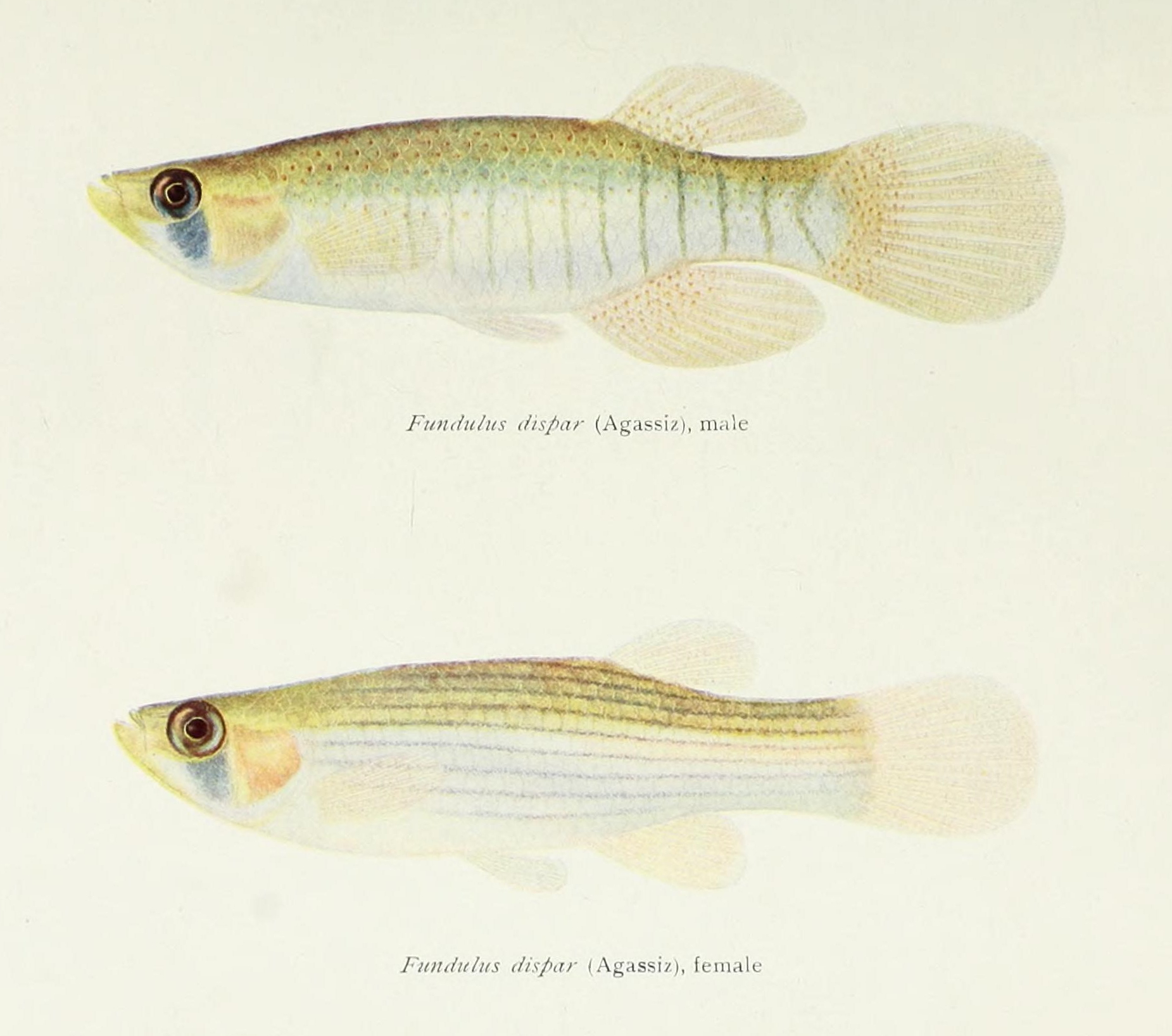
- Illustration of Fundulus dispar

Conservation status
- Least Concern (IUCN 3.1)

Scientific classification
- Kingdom: Animalia
- Phylum: Chordata
- Class: Actinopterygii
- Order: Cyprinodontiformes
- Family: Fundulidae
- Genus: Fundulus
- Species: F. dispar

Binomial name
- Fundulus dispar (Agassiz, 1854)

Synonyms
- Zygonectes dispar Agassiz, 1854

= Fundulus dispar =

Species of fish

The Starhead topminnow (Fundulus dispar) is a native United States species that ranges from the Ouachita River drainage in Louisiana, the Big Black river in Mississippi, and extends northward into the Mississippi River and Lake Michigan basins to the southern Michigan and southern Wisconsin areas. The Starhead topminnow is endangered due to the removal of aquatic vegetation and the continued development of land that infringes on its habitat.

== Etymology ==
The name Fundulus dispar comes from the Latin fundus meaning bottom with -ulus as a diminutive suffix and dispar meaning unlike, dissimilar, different, or unequal.

== Description ==
The Starhead topminnow can be identified by its light olive tan back and upper sides with the lower sides and belly lighter to yellowish in color. It has a series of red to brown lines along its sides, 6 to 8 on females and 3 to 13 on males. There is a prominent dark blotch of color (similar to a teardrop) beneath its eye. The dorsal fin is located far down the posterior end on the back. Adult length can be 1.8–2.2 inches (47–55mm) There are 16 to 20, usually 18 to 20, scales around the caudal peduncle. There is a bright gold spot on the top of the head from which it gets its name, as well as a smaller spot in front of the dorsal fin.

== Ecology ==
=== Habitat ===
Starhead topminnow is a freshwater fish will live in glacial lakes and clear, well-vegetated floodplain lakes, swamps and marshes. It prefers quiet areas with plenty of submerged vegetation for it to live and hide in. Spawning of these fish also occur in beds of aquatic vegetation. Spawning occurs from June through July.

=== Geographic Distribution ===
Starhead topminnow is present in the central Mississippi River drainage from the Ouachita River drainage in Louisiana, north to the Wisconsin River drainage, and east to the headwaters of the Kankakee River drainage in Indiana.

The population of Starhead topminnow in Illinois has been found to be sporadic . There are records of the Starhead Topminnow from the Fox River Chain of Lakes, Pecatonica, Kankakee, central and lower Illinois, and lower Wabash river drainages, as well as the LaRue-Pine Hills Ecological Area.

In 2024, after decades of being presumed extirpated, an isolated population of starhead topminnows was discovered in Iowa in a slough of the Mississippi River. This was the first population found in Iowa since 1938.

=== Diet ===
The Starhead feeds on terrestrial and aquatic insects, crustaceans, mollusks and aquatic vegetation.

== Reproduction ==
Mating season for the Starhead topminnow is approximately from June to August. During mating season, the largest recorded number of eggs laid by a single female is 33. Starhead topminnows have been found to not reproduce if the water temperature is below 18.4 degrees Celsius (65.3 degrees Fahrenheit) or above 29 degrees Celsius (84.2 degrees Fahrenheit).

Starhead topminnows have been found to prefer to lay their eggs among vegetation or on the floor of the environment. After spawning against a substrate, among vegetation, an egg is produced, which is abandoned by both of the parents.

Eggs are spherical and translucent at less than 24 hours post-fertilization. The average size is about 1.9mm in diameter. Eggs incubated at about 25 degrees Celsius hatch in about 9–11 days.

== Management ==
Because the Starhead topminnow spawns in aquatic vegetation, the removal of aquatic vegetation in the Fox River Chain of Lakes has had a negative impact on the topminnow population. Continuation of this trend is likely to result in continued declines in population size and distribution. It is theorized that continued residential development along shorelines in the Kankakee River area have contributed to a decline in population for the area.

=== Wisconsin ===
The Wisconsin Department of Natural Resources has classified the Starhead topminnow as endangered with the state rank of S2. S2 species are qualified as: imperiled due to a restricted range, few populations or occurrences, steep declines, severe threats, or other threats.

The Wisconsin DNR has also assigned Starhead topminnow with a global rank of G4. G4 species are qualified as being apparently secure, but with possible cause for some concern as a result of local recent declines, threats, or other declines.

=== Illinois ===
The Illinois Department of Natural Resources lists Starhead topminnow as threatened.
