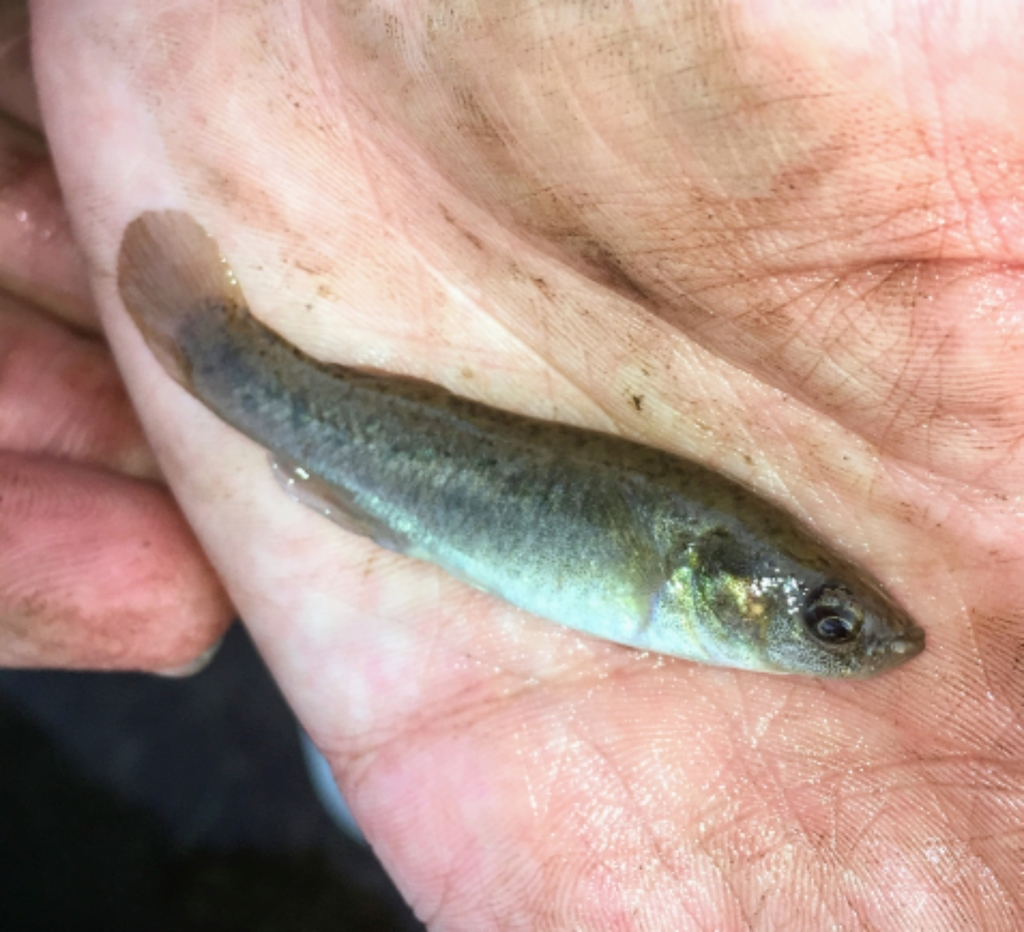

Conservation status
- Vulnerable (IUCN 3.1)

Scientific classification
- Kingdom: Animalia
- Phylum: Chordata
- Class: Actinopterygii
- Division: Teleostei
- Order: Cyprinodontiformes
- Family: Fundulidae
- Genus: Fundulus
- Species: F. jenkinsi

Binomial name
- Fundulus jenkinsi (Evermann, 1892)

Synonyms
- Zygonectes jenkinsi Evermann, 1892

= Saltmarsh topminnow =

Species of fish

The saltmarsh topminnow (Fundulus jenkinsi) is a species of killifish of the family Fundulidae. It occurs in the coastal wetlands of the Gulf of Mexico in the United States.

== Description ==
Saltmarsh topminnows have little color in life; there is cross-hatching on the back and sides that may be gray-green or fainter, and 12 to 30 dark round spots are often arranged in rows along the midside of the body from above the pectoral fin to the base of the caudal fin.

== Ecology ==
Saltmarsh topminnows live in estuaries, coastal salt marshes and backwater sloughs including shallow tidal meanders of Spartina marshes. They are endemic to brackish water areas from Galveston Bay, Texas to Escambia Bay in the western panhandle of Florida.

== Conservation ==
Habitat alteration, dredging, and marsh erosion are the most serious threats to the saltmarsh topminnow.

== Conservation designations ==
IUCN: Vulnerable.

American Fisheries Society: Threatened in Florida, vulnerable elsewhere.

Species of Greatest Conservation Need: FL, LA, MS.

== Status reviews ==
In 2006 the Species of Concern Grant program funded the Mississippi Department of Marine Resources for the study: "Fundulus jenkinsi, Saltmarsh Topminnow: Conservation Planning and Implementation".

== Species description and etymology ==
Fundulus jenkinsi was described in 1892 as Zygonectes jenkinsi by Barton Warren Evermann with the type locality given as Dickinson Bayou, near Galveston, Texas. The specific name honours the American physiologist Oliver Peebles Jenkins (1850-1935) of Stanford University.
