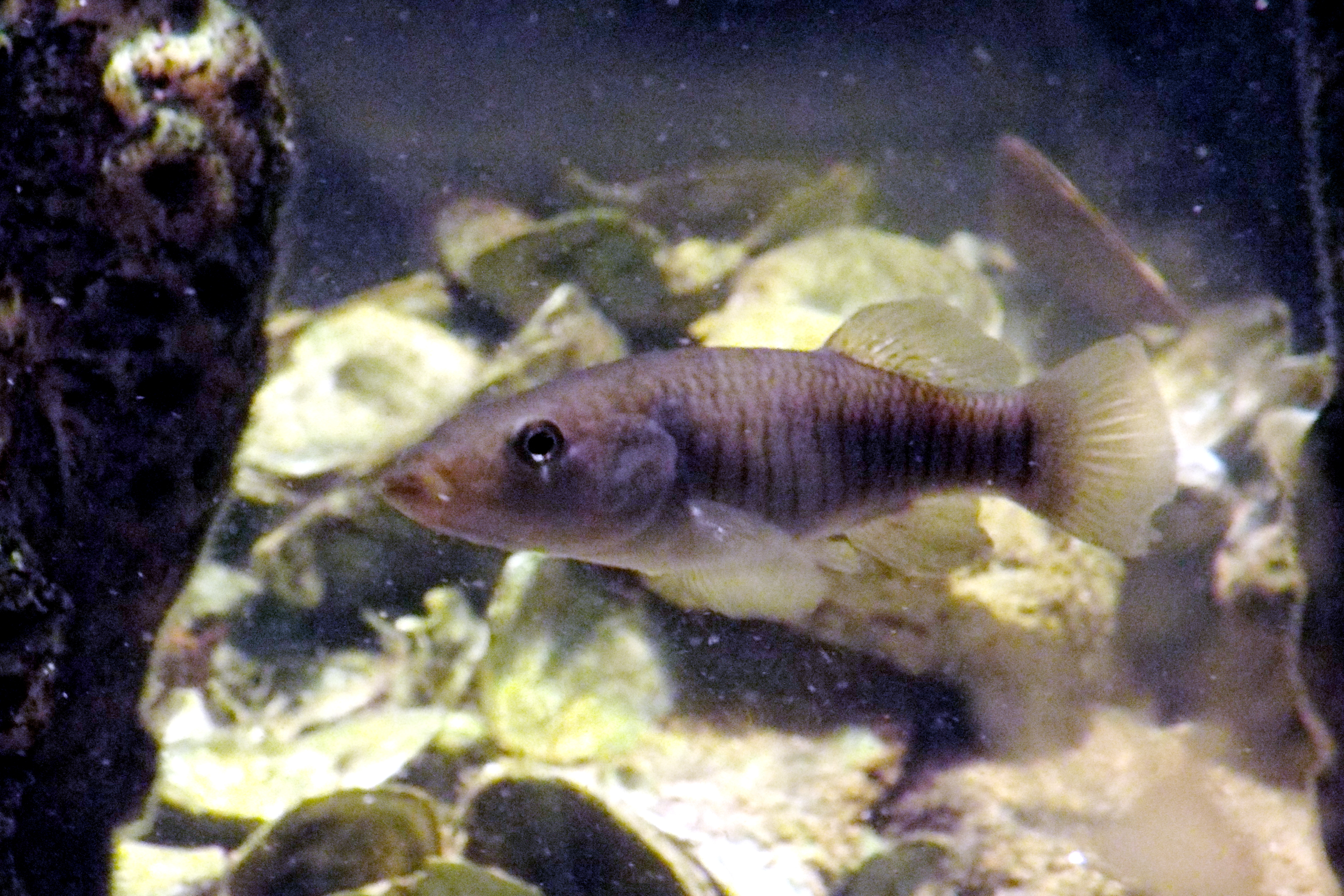

Conservation status
- Least Concern (IUCN 3.1)

Scientific classification
- Kingdom: Animalia
- Phylum: Chordata
- Class: Actinopterygii
- Order: Cyprinodontiformes
- Family: Fundulidae
- Genus: Fundulus
- Species: F. similis

Binomial name
- Fundulus similis (Baird and Girard, 1853)

Synonyms
- Fundulus insularis (Relyea, 1967); Hydrargyra similis (Baird & Girard, 1853)

= Fundulus similis =

Species of fish

The longnose killifish (Fundulus similis) is a marine tropical benthopelagic fish of the genus Fundulus and the family Fundulidae. It is endemic to the western Atlantic Ocean, ranging from along the coast of the Gulf of Mexico from the Florida Keys to Tampico in Mexico. It can grow up to 12 centimeters in length. The body is rounded, elongate, and olive to silver colored with dark vertical stripes. It can be distinguished from other killifish by its long snout and a dark spot on last vertical bar. This species requires a new binomial, as Fundulus similis is preoccupied by a junior synonym of Fundulus majalis, the name having been given to a Gulf of Mexico population of that species.
