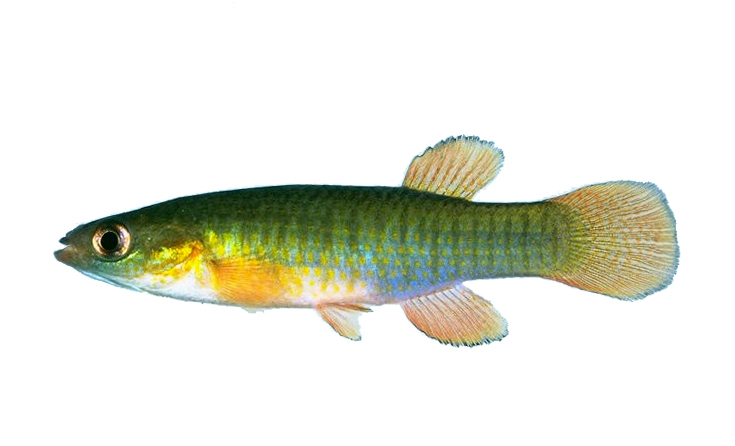

Conservation status
- Least Concern (IUCN 3.1)

Scientific classification
- Kingdom: Animalia
- Phylum: Chordata
- Class: Actinopterygii
- Order: Cyprinodontiformes
- Family: Fundulidae
- Genus: Fundulus
- Species: F. cingulatus

Binomial name
- Fundulus cingulatus (Valenciennes, 1846)

Synonyms
- Micristius cingulatus (Valenciennes, 1846); Zygonectes cingulatus (Valenciennes, 1846); Fundulus zonatus (Valenciennes, 1846); Zygonectes craticula (Goode & T. H. Bean, 1882); Fundulus craticula (Goode & T. H. Bean, 1882); Zygonectes auroguttatus (O. P. Hay, 1885); Fundulus auroguttatus (O. P. Hay, 1885); Zygonectes zonifer (D. S. Jordan & S. E. Meek, 1885); Fundulus zonifer (D. S. Jordan & S. E. Meek, 1885)

= Banded topminnow =

Species of fish

The banded topminnow (Fundulus cingulatus) is a North American species of temperate freshwater killifish belonging to the genus Fundulus of the family Fundulidae.

== Taxonomy ==
The genus name Fundulus comes from fundus, meaning bottom, from the fish's habit of swimming near muddy bottoms. The species name cingulatus, also derived from Latin means "girded". The banded topminow was first described by American zoologist Achille Valenciennes in 1846, when it was sighted near Charleston, South Carolina.

The common name, "banded topminnow", refers to the distinct olive-green bandings found along their sides.
