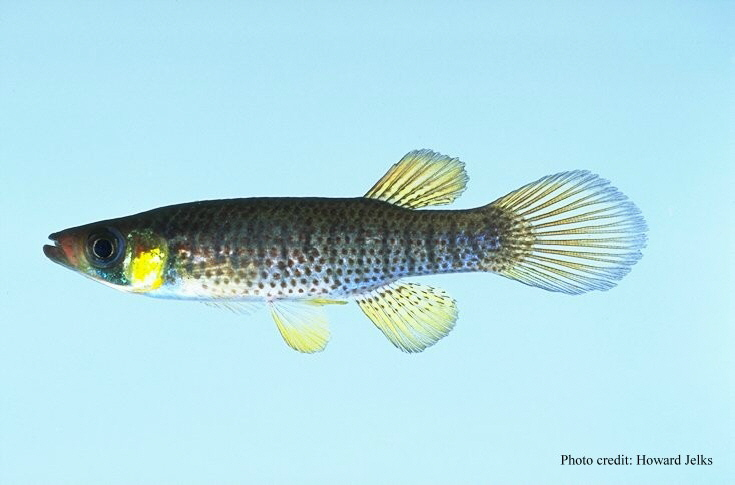

Conservation status
- Least Concern (IUCN 3.1)

Scientific classification
- Kingdom: Animalia
- Phylum: Chordata
- Class: Actinopterygii
- Order: Cyprinodontiformes
- Family: Fundulidae
- Genus: Fundulus
- Species: F. escambiae

Binomial name
- Fundulus escambiae (Bollman, 1887)

= Russetfin topminnow =

Species of fish

The russetfin topminnow (Fundulus escambiae) is a North American species of temperate freshwater killifish belonging to the genus Fundulus of the family Fundulidae.
