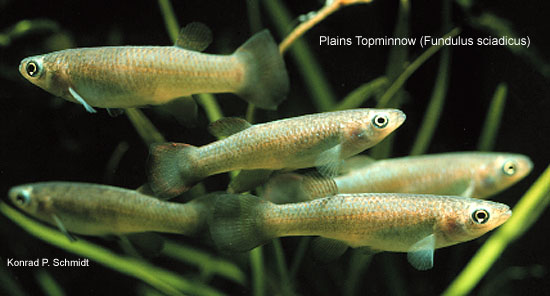

Conservation status
- Least Concern (IUCN 3.1)

Scientific classification
- Kingdom: Animalia
- Phylum: Chordata
- Class: Actinopterygii
- Order: Cyprinodontiformes
- Family: Fundulidae
- Genus: Fundulus
- Species: F. sciadicus

Binomial name
- Fundulus sciadicus (Cope, 1865)

Synonyms
- Haplochilus floripinnis Cope, 1874; Fundulus floripinnis (Cope, 1874); Zygonectes lineatus Garman, 1881; Fundulus lineatus (Garman, 1881); Zygonectes macdonaldi Meek, 1891; Fundulus macdonaldi (Meek, 1891)

= Plains topminnow =

Species of fish

The plains topminnow (Fundulus sciadicus) is a species of freshwater topminnow found in North America. The fish has a small range within the United States of America which consists of two major populations.

== Description ==
The plains topminnow is small, almost always shorter than 2.5 inches (6.35 cm). The fish has a flat head and an upturned (superior) mouth. It lacks any distinctive markings. The male plains topminnow's fins are iridescent and have a red tip with blue-purple bands, as well as a gold stripe on the body. Both males and females are usually olive-brown with white on its underside. The plains topminnow also has bronze reflections with faint blue-green cross-hatching on its back and sides. Its fins are colorless or yellowish in immature fish, females and non-breeding males. There are no black bars on the fish's body, which makes it distinguishable from the banded killifish, a more common species, which is often found in the same habitats as the plains topminnow. Two other distinct features of the plains topminnow are its rounded caudal fin and the absence of an externally visible lateral line. The plains topminnow has 33 to 37 ctenoid scales in its lateral line. The dorsal fin has 9–12 rays, the anal fin 12–15 rays and the origin of the anal fin is slightly forward of the dorsal fin, the pelvic fin is small and in the abdominal position. The plains topminnow also has a squared caudal fin, a trait that many topminnows and killifish share. There is little sexual dimorphism between males and females except during breeding season, when males have bright orange-red fin tips.

== Distribution and habitat ==
The historical distribution of plains topminnow includes two main populations. The first population of Plains topminnows is largely in Nebraska extending into Iowa, southwestern Minnesota, northeastern Colorado and southern South Dakota. The second population is located in Missouri, Kansas and south into Oklahoma. The plains topminnow was found only in one county each in Iowa and Kansas, the topminnow is now believed to be extirpated from both states, with recent studies supporting this.

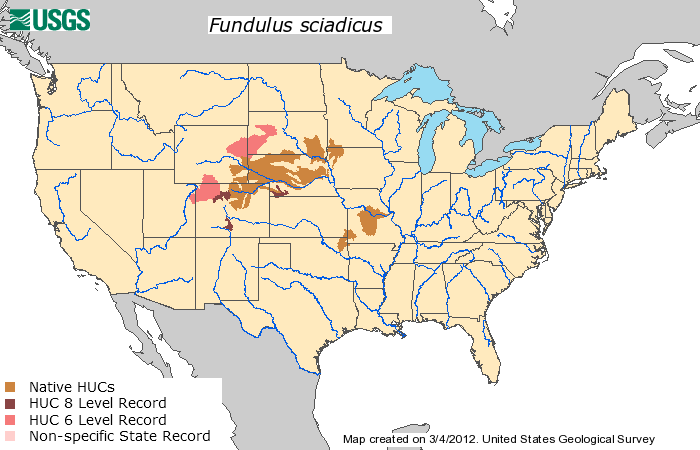
The distribution of the plains topminnow in the United States

Plains topminnows prefer places with slow water to faster currents. The plains topminnows are also usually found in places where there is shallow, clear water and heavy vegetation. Habitats with these characteristics include sloughs, backwaters and pools. The plains topminnow can be found in water with some turbidity and moderate current, however they prefer the conditions listed above. Most studies rank the plains topminnow as moderately tolerant to hyperthermic and hypoxic conditions. Habitat loss is a major concern for this species (see Conservation). Plains topminnows prefer water within the range of 5 °C-22 °C.

== Reproduction and Life History ==
The plains topminnow spawns in the same vegetated areas that it lives in. Males develop red coloring on their fins and, both males and females gain a black border around their medial fins. The most studied populations in Nebraska show breeding color on the plains topminnow males from June 20 to July 21. However, the plains topminnow has been observed spawning anytime between late March to early August. The wide range of spawning time is believed to be due to water temperature. Thus, plains topminnow spawning times usually depend on the latitude of individual populations. The plains topminnow breeding season was observed at 60 days in Missouri and Nebraska, regardless of latitude and water temperature. Breeding behavior for the plains topminnow, demonstrated in wild individuals transplanted into an aquarium, includes direct male competition. The males size each other up by swimming in circles and attempting to bite the dorsal fin of the other male, some males will do this for up to 90 minutes. This behavior establishes a few dominant breeding males in each population. The males and females were seen moving wiggling in algae in their habitat, this was assumed to be ovipositing behavior since eggs were observed in the algae after the wiggling behavior. Mature plains topminnow eggs are 1.8 to 2.0 mm in diameter.

== Conservation Status and Concerns ==
Although the plains topminnow is not considered a federally threatened, endangered, or sensitive species and has a Global Heritage Status Rank of G4 (apparently secure) from the Nature Conservancy, there has been a declining trend in the distribution of the plains topminnow, particularly in the Platte and Republican River Drainages. Currently, the plains topminnow are found in only 34.4% of sites that have historically been inhabited by the plains topminnow. In Minnesota, the plains topminnow is present in all historical locations, however, abundance is lower than normal at 69.2% compared to past collections. The primary threats to the plains topminnow are physical or chemical habitat degradation, stream fragmentation, introduction of nonnative fishes, reservoir creations, sewage discharge, feedlot runoff, intense livestock grazing and pumping of saline groundwater. It is also believed that eutrophication, causing low oxygen conditions and high ammonia concentrations, is adding to the depletion of plains topminnow levels. In order to prevent the decline of plains topminnow populations, certain measures should be taken, such as securing in stream flow, minimizing drying of stream channels due to irrigation withdrawals, establishing preserves in perennial stream reaches and the management of livestock around plains topminnow populated waters.

== Diet Habits ==
The food habits of the plains topminnow are not well studied, however, they are believed to feed on a varied diet. The diet may include insects, mainly larvae; snails, and Ostracod crustaceans.
