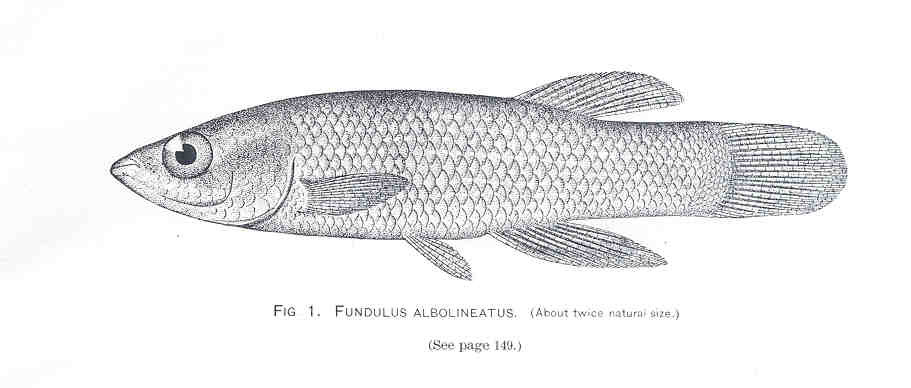

Conservation status
- Extinct (IUCN 3.1)

Scientific classification
- Kingdom: Animalia
- Phylum: Chordata
- Class: Actinopterygii
- Order: Cyprinodontiformes
- Family: Fundulidae
- Genus: Fundulus
- Species: †F. albolineatus

Binomial name
- †Fundulus albolineatus C. H. Gilbert, 1891

= Whiteline topminnow =

Species of fish

The whiteline topminnow, Fundulus albolineatus, was a type of killifish first identified in 1891. It was endemic to Big Spring, Madison County, Alabama, in the United States. This species was nearly identical to the barrens topminnow and grew to 3.75 inches (8.4 cm) long. It went extinct due to the rapid development of Big Spring leaving no habitat for it to thrive, and the last individuals were captured in 1889.
