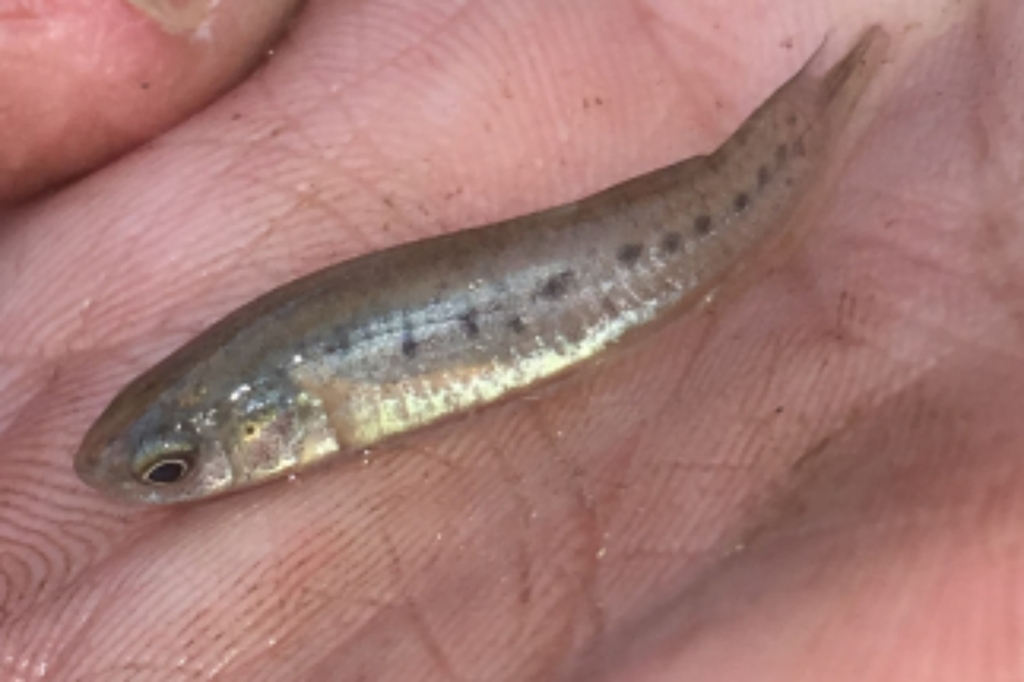

Conservation status
- Least Concern (IUCN 3.1)

Scientific classification
- Kingdom: Animalia
- Phylum: Chordata
- Class: Actinopterygii
- Division: Teleostei
- Order: Cyprinodontiformes
- Family: Fundulidae
- Genus: Fundulus
- Species: F. pulvereus

Binomial name
- Fundulus pulvereus (Evermann, 1892)

Synonyms
- Zygonectes pulvereus Evermann, 1892; Fundulus spilotus Holbrook, 1863; Zygonectes funduloides Evermann, 1892; Fundulus funduloides (Evermann, 1892); Fundulus limbatus Krøyer, 1896

= Fundulus pulvereus =

Species of fish

The bayou killifish or bayou topminnow (Fundulus pulvereus) is a topminnow-like fish that thrives primarily in the shallow waters off the shores of the Americas, as well as fresh and brackish waters. Feeding off of small vertebrates and invertebrates, this fish displays reproduction techniques unique to its species.

A member of the family Fundulidae, the bayou killifish belongs to one of the most common orders of fish, Cyprinodontiformes, which includes most small aquarium topminnows and North American killifish. Discovered in 1892, the bayou killifish is one of over 1000 species of killifish, and remains a thriving species amongst many others in the oceans. Its scientific name derives from the Latin word "fundus," which literally means "bottom," and many view this as ironic since the fish is a type of topminnow. However, the name was coined for a bottom species of the Atlantic coast, being the least important of the fundulus mudfish. Bayou killifish are fairly small, and only grow to a maximum length of 7 centimetres (2.8 in). Given its size, the bayou killifish is fairly easy to spot in its natural environment. Living mostly in shallow waters, the male bayou killifish displays bright striped patterns of silver and olive-green, while the females are uniquely spotted.

== Description and identification ==
Although most killifish belonging to the family Fundulidae share similar characteristics, the bayou killifish displays its own set of definitive markings that contrast it from other closely related species of topminnows and killifish. It has a body shape resembling that of a minnow that one may see in a small tidal pool near an ocean, but it is usually easier to spot because of its size. Unlike many other minnows, the bayou killifish usually grows to a maximum length of 5–7 centimetres (2.0–2.8 in), enabling it to have the size it needs to defend itself, as well as the maneuverability of a much smaller fish. All bayou killifish, both male and female, can be distinguished from other species of fish by their wide mouth.

Bayou killifish display sexual dimorphism, which is a physical difference between males and females of the same species of animal. In the species, males usually tend to have a much more elongated body than females, as well as more characteristic markings. Males display an olive-green coloration on the top half of the body near the dorsal fin, with gold sides and a silvery bottom. Sometimes, the males will have a dark spot on or near the rear dorsal fin, just above dark vertical stripes that line the gold sides. Female bayou killifish, however, are usually somewhat smaller than the males, and display dark spots all over their body—a characteristic unique to the females. Accompanying these spots are faint, often broken vertical stripes along the dorsum of the fish.

Another distinguishing characteristic of the bayou killifish is also seen in the rest of its genus. All seven species belonging to Fundulus, including the bayou killifish, are native to the Gulf coast and Atlantic waters of North America. What makes them different from other killifish genera is the formation of the maxilla, a bone that helps form the upper jaw of the fish. In F. pulvereus and other species belonging to the subgenera "Fundulus", the maxilla has a distinctly concave edge near the back of the bone, toward the brain. In other species belonging to different subgenera, the maxilla may not be concave at all. Instead, they possess a straightened maxilla with no concavity towards the anterior. The purpose of the concavity in the maxilla of F. pulvereus is relatively unknown. However, if one were to study the morphology and skeletal structures of many different species of killifish carcasses, they would easily be able to pick out a Fundulus species because of their distinctive maxilla.

== Habitat and diet ==
Just as the name implies, the bayou killifish predominates many freshwater and brackish environments such as bays, marshes, swamps, and bayous along the Atlantic coast. However, due to a remarkable adaptation of the killifish's lungs, the species is also capable of inhabiting marine environments such as saltwater marshes and oceans. The bayou killifish is a non-seasonal killifish, meaning that it is non-migratory, and thus occupies the same territories within the Western Atlantic waters of both Americas year round. Most populations of bayou killifish can be found in the temperate coastal waters of the Atlantic coast of North America, as well as the Gulf of Mexico. They often inhabit moderately warm waters with temperatures ranging from 15–26 °C (59–79 °F). Shallower waters such as marshes and bays along the coast serve as suitable habitats for Bayou Killifish because of the absence of unstable isotopes and fluctuating pHs that are often found in deeper and more fluent water habitats. These shallow environments provide a sufficient amount of bacteria that thrive in unstable conditions with questionable isotope ratios, and thus provide a steady system of bacterial degradation that in turn stabilizes conditions suitable for bayou killifish.

Because many of these fish live in marsh-type environments, their main food source consists of small aquatic insects and isopods. Isopods, small crustaceans that usually live on the bottom of freshwater and marine environments, serve as the primary food source for the bayou killifish for several reasons. Dating back to Carboniferous period 300 million years ago, many aquatic isopods have evolved to live in unstable environments. Isopods can withstand high radiation contamination as well as unstable isotope levels in water. Therefore, they thrive in many of the unstable conditions where bayou killifish live, serving as a convenient food source for these fish. Predation is not a major problem for F. pulvereus, as nothing consumes them as a steady food source. Thus, the bayou killifish has a stable population that is invulnerable to predators.

== Reproduction ==
Many biologists studying the bayou killifish consider their reproduction one of the most important concepts of the species to understand, because most of the fish's behavior is based on its reproduction habits. Bayou killifish reproduce sexually and are oviparous, meaning that they give birth via laying eggs. This is a characteristic that most of the fish in the order Cyprinodontiformes share, though some may be viviparous. Little is known about the spawning seasons of the bayou killifish, however, biologists do know that this species of killifish spawns mainly during the spring, more specifically during the spring tides—periods of 3 to 6 days biweekly, that occur in a period known as the semi-lunar phase. Biologists conclude that this tide-associated spawning may be a common component in the reproductive strategies and behaviors of most, if not all, cyprinodontids of North America. Although many studies have been conducted involving the reproduction of these killifish, few findings have been made referring to the full reproductive habits of the Bayou Killifish. Future studies and research is crucial to understanding these creatures, and more importantly their well-being in future generations. Entire populations of F. pulvereus rely on its reproductive habits and behaviors.

== Biological status ==
F. pulvereus can withstand many biological and environmental stresses such as habitat degradation, predation, and limited food sources, due mainly to its evolution within certain habitats. Bayou Killifish have a very specific diet, but one that happens to contain a plethora of microorganisms that are crucial to its existence. F. pulvereus lives in primarily hostile environments, so predation is not necessarily an issue for survival. However, these fish are susceptible to the parasitic fluke worm, Calyptospora funduli. Common among many fish, especially Cyprinodontids, F. pulvereus has a very high rate of inhabitants of this parasite, with approximately 31% naturally infected. While serving as a host for the worm, Bayou Killifish are not vectors for the worm and thus cannot spread them to other organisms. The parasite can have many effects on the intestinal fortitude and reproductive abilities of the killifish, though current studies have shown little effect of Calyptospora funduli on the Bayou Killifish. Unlike fish who belong to one of the largest orders of vertebrates, Perciformes, killifish like F. pulvereus belonging to the orders Atheriniformes and Cyprinodontiformes are not naturally resistant to the infestation of Calyptospora funduli. Possibly a future threat for the Bayou Killifish C. fuduli shows no recent negative impact on F. pulvereus other than taking up significant space in the digestive tract. Other than a future mishap with this parasitic fluke worm, few threats are known to exist for the Bayou Killifish. F. pulvereus is a very stable species, and shows no degradation in the near future.

== Similar species ==
Males are similar in structure and appearance to the longnose killifish, with the bayou killifish being distinguishable by their thicker stripes. Bayou killifish also resemble the diamond killifish, but have no pointed snout as the diamond killifish does. All bayou killifish are easy to identify, and distinguishable enough to stand out from any other type of killifish or topminnow.

== Interesting facts ==
There are currently no bag limits/regulations on the Bayou Killifish. Bayou killifish are harmless to humans, and other organisms that inhabit their territory. Although F. pulvereus has a high tolerance for very unstable conditions such an unstable isotope concentration and high salinity content, they are very sensitive to temperature. Bayou killifish do not thrive in cold temperatures, mostly those below 15 degrees Celsius (about 60 degrees Fahrenheit).Due to their size and maneuverability, Bayou Killifish are able to avoid the few predators that they do have, a defense mechanism crucial to the survival of the species. Because F. pulvereus is not very vulnerable, they have few, if any, predators.

F. pulvereus belong to one of the largest orders of fish in the oceans, Cyprinodontiformes, which hosts many common fish found in aquariums or kept in captivity elsewhere, including ray-finned fish and all killifish. Cyprinodontids can be oviparous (egg-laying), viviparous (birth to live young), or ovoviviparous (every species gives birth to live young). Bayou killifish are benthopelagic, meaning that they have a neutral buoyancy and can thus float at any depth without much trouble. This is due to a drastically reduced body mass, as well as the ability to take advantage of a low metabolic rate.

== See also ==
- Killifish
