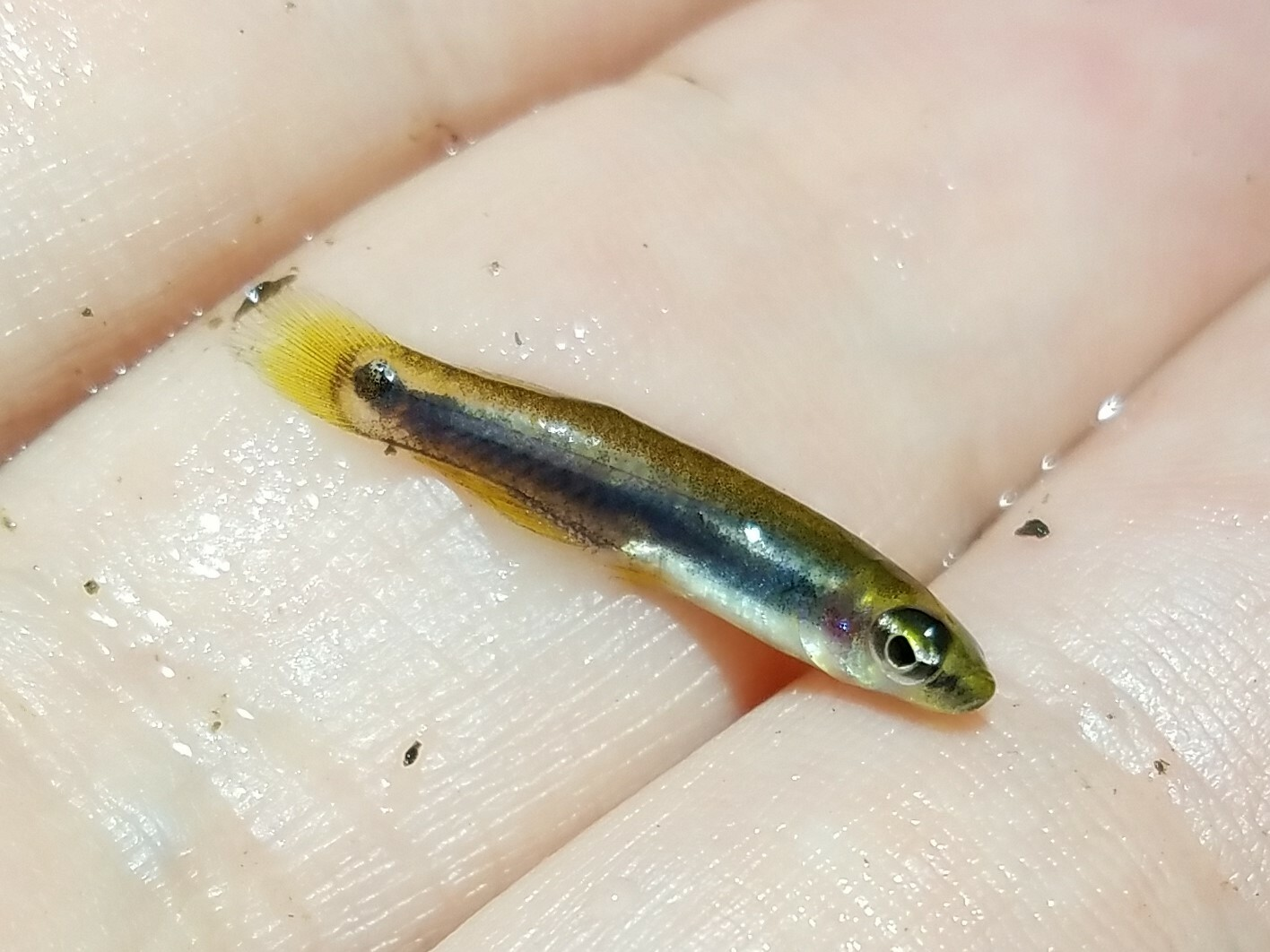

Conservation status
- Least Concern (IUCN 3.1)

Scientific classification
- Kingdom: Animalia
- Phylum: Chordata
- Class: Actinopterygii
- Division: Teleostei
- Order: Cyprinodontiformes
- Family: Fundulidae
- Genus: Leptolucania; G. S. Myers, 1924
- Species: L. ommata

Binomial name
- Leptolucania ommata (Jordan, 1884)

Synonyms
- Heterandria ommata Jordan, 1884; Zygonectes mannii Hay, 1885; Leptolucania manni (Hay, 1885)

= Leptolucania =

Species of fish

Leptolucania ommata, the Pygmy killifish, is a species of North American killifish found only in the southeastern United States. This fish is also found in the aquarium trade. This species grows to a length of 3 centimetres (1.2 in) TL. They are yellow with gold and blue-green towards the tail. While males have a small dark spot at the base of their tail, females tend to have one at the base of their tail, and one at the midpoint of their body. It is the only known member of its genus. The pygmy killifish was formally described by David Starr Jordan as Heterandria ommata in 1884, the type locality being given as Indian River, Florida.
