= Baja California killifish =

Conservation status
- Endangered (IUCN 3.1)

Scientific classification
- Kingdom: Animalia
- Phylum: Chordata
- Class: Actinopterygii
- Order: Cyprinodontiformes
- Family: Fundulidae
- Genus: Fundulus
- Species: F. lima

Binomial name
- Fundulus lima Vaillant, 1894

Synonyms
- Fundulus meeki Evermann, 1908

Species of fish

The Baja California killifish (Fundulus lima) is a killifish in the family Fundulidae. It is native to the Baja California Peninsula region of northwestern Mexico. This fish was described by L.L. Vaillant in 1894 with the type locality given as San Ignacio de Caracamande in central Baja California.

The Baja California killifishes found in oases, springs, ponds, and creeks which have clear water with low salinity levels and relatively slow flows with substrates consisting of bedrock, sand, and gravel. Their diet is varied by season and is made up of diatoms, insect larvae, and fish scales during the dry season while in the rainy season it is mainly insect larvae, filamentous algae, and ostracods.
