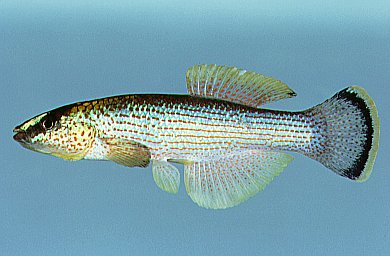

Conservation status
- Least Concern (IUCN 3.1)

Scientific classification
- Kingdom: Animalia
- Phylum: Chordata
- Class: Actinopterygii
- Order: Cyprinodontiformes
- Family: Fundulidae
- Genus: Fundulus
- Species: F. catenatus

Binomial name
- Fundulus catenatus (Storer, 1846)

Synonyms
- Poecilia catenata Storer, 1846

= Northern studfish =

Species of fish

The northern studfish (Fundulus catenatus) is among the largest of the killifish and is native to the southcentral United States.

== Distribution ==
Upper East Fork White River system, Indiana; upper Salt and Kentucky River drainages, Kentucky; upper Green middle, and lower Cumberland, and Tennessee River drainages, Virginia, Kentucky, Tennessee, Alabama, and Mississippi; West of Mississippi River (primarily Ozark and Ouachita uplands) in central and southern Missouri, southeastern Kansas, eastern Oklahoma and southern Arkansas; southwestern Mississippi in the Mississippi drainage (Coles Creek, Homochitto River, and Buffalo Bayou) and Gulf Slope drainage (Amite River and Pearl River). Live bait buckets and releases of aquarium pets have caused expansion of the native distribution of this species.

== Description ==
The mean length for adults is 3 to 6 inches (7.6 to 15.2 cm) with a maximum size of 7 inches (18 cm). Northern studfish are sexually dimorphic. Males have horizontal rows of bright orange spots on light blue background and a bright orange tail margin followed by a nearly black band during breeding season. Females are more cryptic colored in shades of beige and olive. Their body shape is elongate and narrow and lacks a lateral line. Northern studfish have spineless fins and both the anal and dorsal fins are large.

== Ecology ==
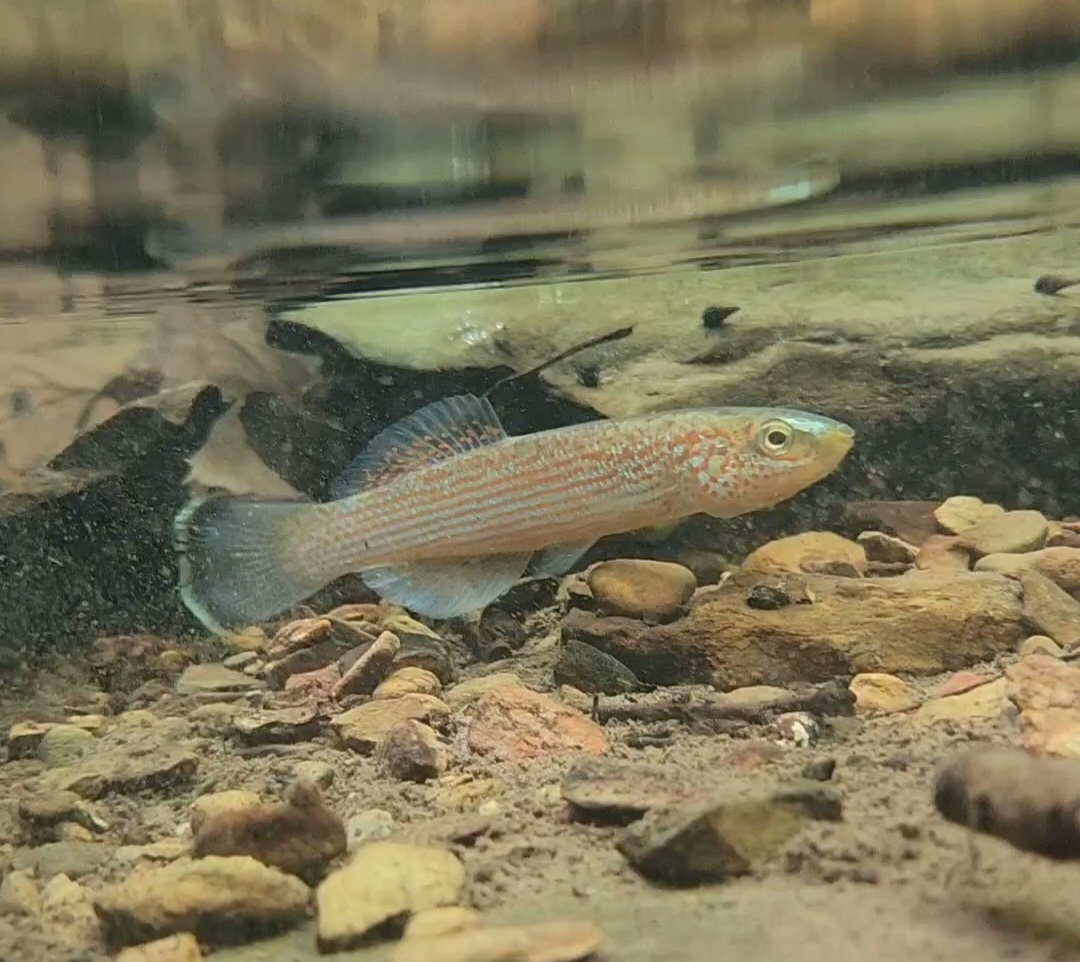
Male, in Tennessee

Northern studfish are egg layers and prefer clear, shallow pools and rocky creeks that have a mixed sand/gravel substrate and constant, sluggish flow. Males do not build nests but they do stake out a territory and defend it. Females lay a clutch of 28 to 245 eggs and give no parental care to their young. Their main diet consists of insects which they skim from the surface of the water but they have also been known to consume snails.

== Management ==
Causes for declining numbers in some areas range from introduction of aggressive non native fish species like the mosquitofish (Gambusia spp.) to anthropogenic loss of water quality and movement from habitat alteration. Northern studfish require clear water so control of sediment is integral. Current management practices are to plant riparian zones in order to stabilize the streambanks and control run off from agriculture and construction projects.
