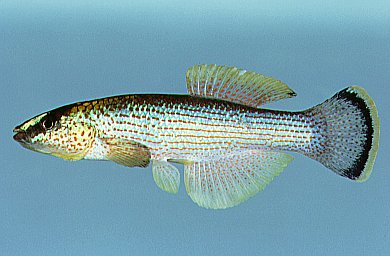
- Northern studfish (F. catenatus)

Scientific classification
- Kingdom: Animalia
- Phylum: Chordata
- Class: Actinopterygii
- Order: Cyprinodontiformes
- Family: Fundulidae
- Genus: Fundulus; Lacépède, 1803

Type species
- Fundulus heteroclitus Lacépède, 1803

Species
- See text

= Fundulus =

Fundulus Temporal range: Early Miocene to present

Genus of fishes

Fundulus is a genus of ray-finned fishes in the superfamily Funduloidea, family Fundulidae (of which it is the type genus). It belongs to the order of toothcarps (Cyprinodontiformes), and therein the large suborder Cyprinodontoidei. Most of its closest living relatives are egg-laying, with the notable exception of the splitfin livebearers (Goodeidae).

They are usually smallish; most species reaching a length of at most 4 in (10 cm) when fully grown. However, a few larger species exist, with the giant killifish (F. grandissimus) and the northern studfish (F. catenatus) growing to twice the genus' average size.

Many of the 40-odd species are commonly known by the highly ambiguous name "killifish" (the general term for egg-laying toothcarps), or the somewhat less ambiguous "topminnow" (a catch-all term for Fundulidae). "Studfish" is a quite unequivocal vernacular name applied to some other Fundulus species; it is not usually used to refer to the genus as a whole.

Fundulus have evolved to occupy a wide range of aquatic ecosystems, including marine, estuarine, and freshwater, making it a good comparative model system for studying evolutionary divergence between marine and freshwater environments. To assist with this research, Oxford Nanopore long-read reference genomes have been sequenced for F. xenicus, F. catenatus, F. nottii, and F. olivaceus.

== Species ==
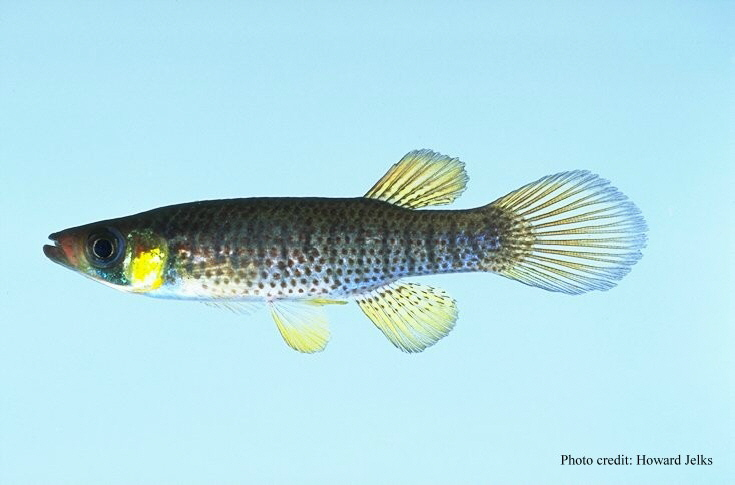
Russetfin Topminnow (F. escambiae)

There are currently 39 recognized species in this genus:

- Fundulus albolineatus C. H. Gilbert, 1891 (Whiteline topminnow (extinct))
- Fundulus bermudae Günther, 1874 (Bermuda killifish)
- Fundulus bifax Cashner & Rogers, 1988 (Stippled studfish)
- Fundulus blairae Wiley & D. D. Hall, 1975 (Western starhead topminnow)
- Fundulus catenatus (D. H. Storer, 1846) (Northern studfish)
- Fundulus chrysotus (Günther, 1866) (Golden topminnow)
- Fundulus cingulatus Valenciennes, 1846 (Banded topminnow)
- Fundulus confluentus Goode & T. H. Bean, 1879 (Marsh killifish)
- Fundulus diaphanus (Lesueur, 1817)
  - Fundulus diaphanus diaphanus (Lesueur, 1817) (Banded killifish)
  - Fundulus diaphanus menona D. S. Jordan & Copeland, 1877
- Fundulus dispar (Agassiz, 1854) (Starhead topminnow)
- Fundulus escambiae (Bollman, 1887) (Russetfin topminnow)
- Fundulus euryzonus Suttkus & Cashner, 1981 (Broadstripe topminnow)
- Fundulus grandis S. F. Baird & Girard, 1853 (Gulf killifish)
- Fundulus grandissimus C. L. Hubbs, 1936 (Giant killifish)
- Fundulus heteroclitus (Linnaeus, 1766)
  - Fundulus heteroclitus heteroclitus (Linnaeus, 1766) (Mummichog)
  - Fundulus heteroclitus macrolepidotus (Walbaum, 1792)
- Fundulus jenkinsi (Evermann, 1892) (Saltmarsh topminnow)
- Fundulus julisia J. D. Williams & Etnier, 1982 (Barrens topminnow)
- Fundulus kansae Garman, 1895 (Northern plains killifish)
- Fundulus lima Vaillant, 1894
- Fundulus lineolatus (Agassiz, 1854) (Lined topminnow)
- Fundulus luciae (S. F. Baird, 1855) (Spotfin killifish)
- Fundulus majalis (Walbaum, 1792) (Striped killifish, Striped mummichog)
- Fundulus notatus (Rafinesque, 1820) (Blackstripe topminnow)
- Fundulus nottii (Agassiz, 1854) (Bayou topminnow)
- Fundulus olivaceus (D. H. Storer, 1845) (Blackspotted topminnow)
- Fundulus parvipinnis Girard, 1854 (California killifish)
- Fundulus persimilis R. R. Miller, 1955 (Yucatán killifish)
- Fundulus philpisteri García-Ramírez, Contreras-Balderas & Lozano-Vilano, 2007
- Fundulus pulvereus (Evermann, 1892) (Bayou killifish)
- Fundulus rathbuni D. S. Jordan & Meek, 1889 (Speckled killifish)
- Fundulus relictus Able & Felley, 1988 (Lover's Lake killifish)
- Fundulus rubrifrons (D. S. Jordan, 1880) (Redface topminnow)
- Fundulus saguanus Rivas, 1948
- Fundulus sciadicus Cope, 1865 (Plains topminnow)
- Fundulus seminolis Girard, 1859 (Seminole killifish)
- Fundulus similis (S. F. Baird & Girard, 1853) (Longnose killifish)
- Fundulus stellifer (D. S. Jordan, 1877) (Southern studfish)
- Fundulus waccamensis C. L. Hubbs & Raney, 1946 (Waccamaw killifish)
- Fundulus xenicus Jordan & Gilbert, 1882 (Diamond killifish)
- Fundulus zebrinus D. S. Jordan & C. H. Gilbert, 1883 (Plains killifish)

The following fossil species are also known:

- †Fundulus curryi R. R. Miller, 1945 - Late Miocene/Early Pliocene of Death Valley, California
- †Fundulus lariversi Abers & Stewart 1972 - Early/Middle Miocene of Nevada
- †Fundulus davidae R. R. Miller, 1945 - Late Miocene/Early Pliocene of Death Valley, California
- †Fundulus detillae Hibbard & Dunkle, 1942 - Middle Pliocene of Kansas (Ogallala Formation)
- †Fundulus eulepis R. R. Miller, 1945 - Late Miocene/Early Pliocene of Death Valley, California
- †Fundulus nevadensis (Eastman, 1917) - Late Miocene of Nevada (Truckee Formation) (=Parafundulus)

The Cuban killifish (Cubanichthys cubensis, a pupfish) was formerly placed in Fundulus.
