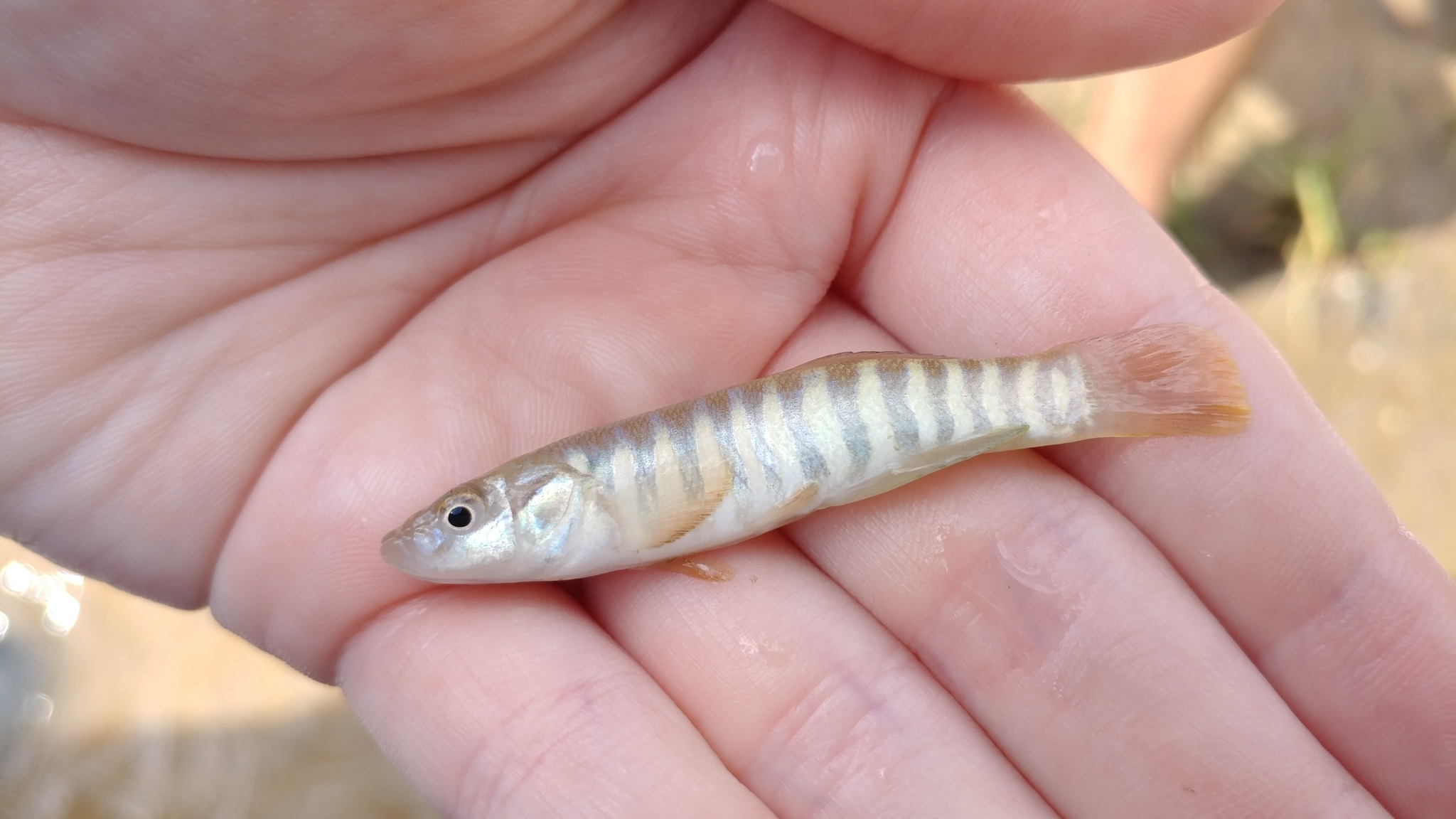

Conservation status
- Least Concern (IUCN 3.1)

Scientific classification
- Kingdom: Animalia
- Phylum: Chordata
- Class: Actinopterygii
- Order: Cyprinodontiformes
- Family: Fundulidae
- Genus: Fundulus
- Species: F. kansae

Binomial name
- Fundulus kansae Garman, 1895

Synonyms
- Plancterus kansae (Garman, 1895)

= Fundulus kansae =

Species of ray-finned fish

Fundulus kansae, commonly known as Northern plains killifish, is a species of fish in the family Fundulidae.

== Distribution ==
Fundulus kansae inhabits the Great Plains region of the United States. It can be found in the shallows of small rivers and ponds.

The species is primarily found in Kansas but can also be found in the nearby states of Texas, Oklahoma, Colorado, Nebraska, and Wyoming. It has been found in Montana, Utah, Arizona, and Nevada, where it is considered non-native.

== Conservation ==
The species is considered least concern by the IUCN due to it being abundant in many locations. Declines, however, have been noted in Kansas, and Missouri. In Colorado and Wyoming, the population is increasing.
