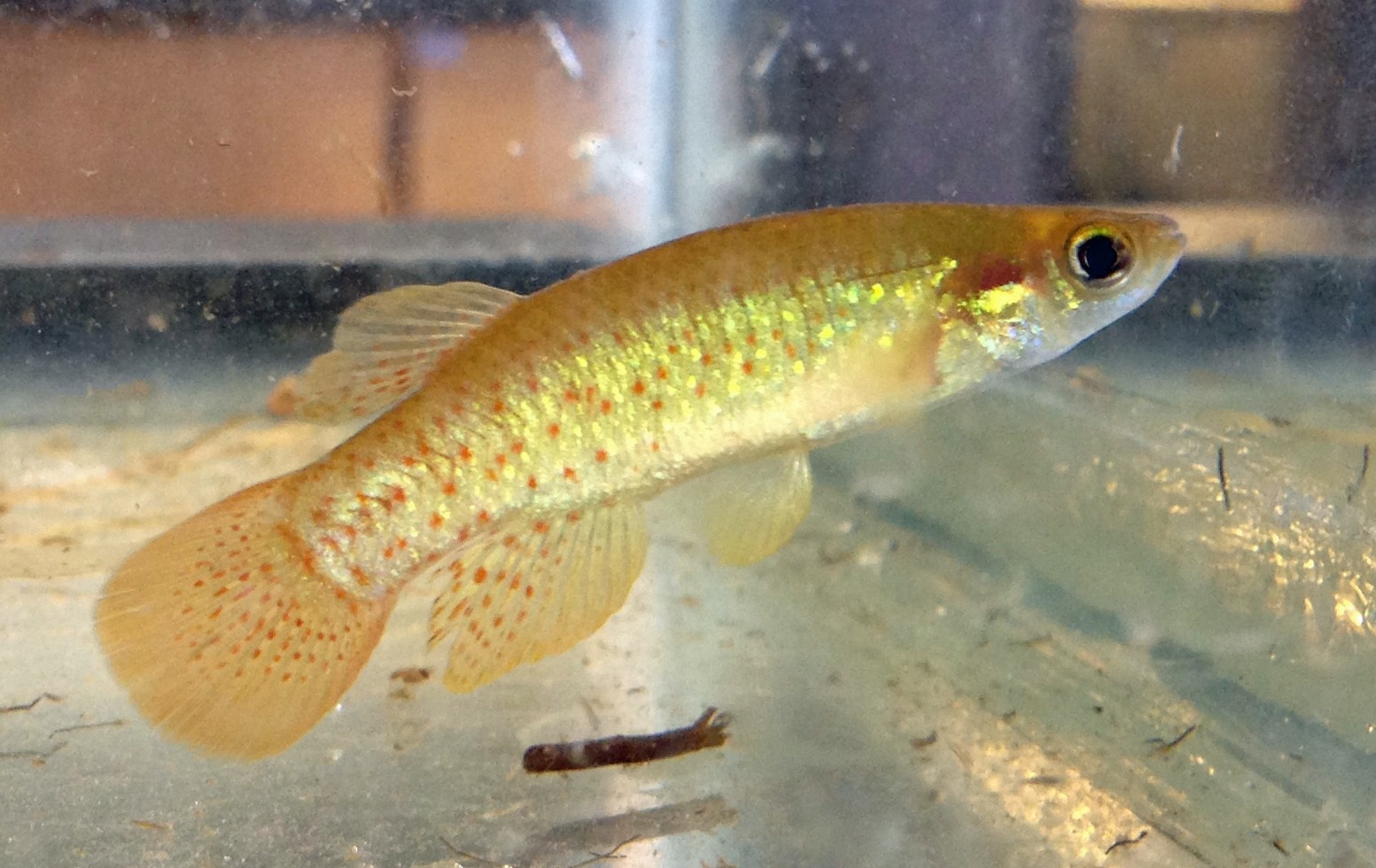

Conservation status
- Least Concern (IUCN 3.1)

Scientific classification
- Kingdom: Animalia
- Phylum: Chordata
- Class: Actinopterygii
- Order: Cyprinodontiformes
- Family: Fundulidae
- Genus: Fundulus
- Species: F. chrysotus

Binomial name
- Fundulus chrysotus (Günther, 1866)

Synonyms
- Haplochilus chrysotus Günther, 1866; Gambusia arlingtonia Goode & Bean, 1879; Fundulus arlingtonius (Goode & Bean, 1879); Zygonectes henshalli Jordan, 1880; Fundulus henshalli (Jordan, 1880); Fundulus scartes Meek, 1896; Fundulus kompi Hildebrand & Towers, 1928

= Golden topminnow =

Species of fish

The golden topminnow (Fundulus chrysotus) is a fish of the genus Fundulus and is a United States native fish mostly distributed throughout the southeast, ranging from Kentucky and Ohio south into Florida. Although it has such a wide distribution throughout the south, the habitats and micro-habitats that it occupies do not differ much from one area of distribution to others. The golden topminnow is a small surface feeding fish that tends to reproduce late in the spring season and on into the early parts of the summer, and although the fry reach maturity fairly quickly the longevity of the golden topminnow is quite short. Because the golden topminnow is lower in the trophic level and is a small fish, it primarily feeds on small and/or drifting organisms at, or near the surface of, vegetated areas. This particular topminnow is not currently listed as an endangered species, nor does it have any particular type of management plan.

== Geographic distribution ==
The golden topminnow is geographically distributed throughout the southeastern portion of the continental U.S. Specifically, the golden topminnow inhabits the Santee River Drainage of South Carolina west to the Trinity River Drainage of Texas. It can also be found throughout the Mississippi Embayment north to Kentucky and Missouri. Further south, the golden topminnow inhabits the Lower Coastal Plain and is commonly scattered throughout Florida. It has even been documented stretching its distribution northwest, extending into the Gulf Coastal Plain in McCurtain County Oklahoma and Mississippi County Missouri. Outside of these areas, the golden topminnow is extremely localized and uncommon.

== Ecology ==
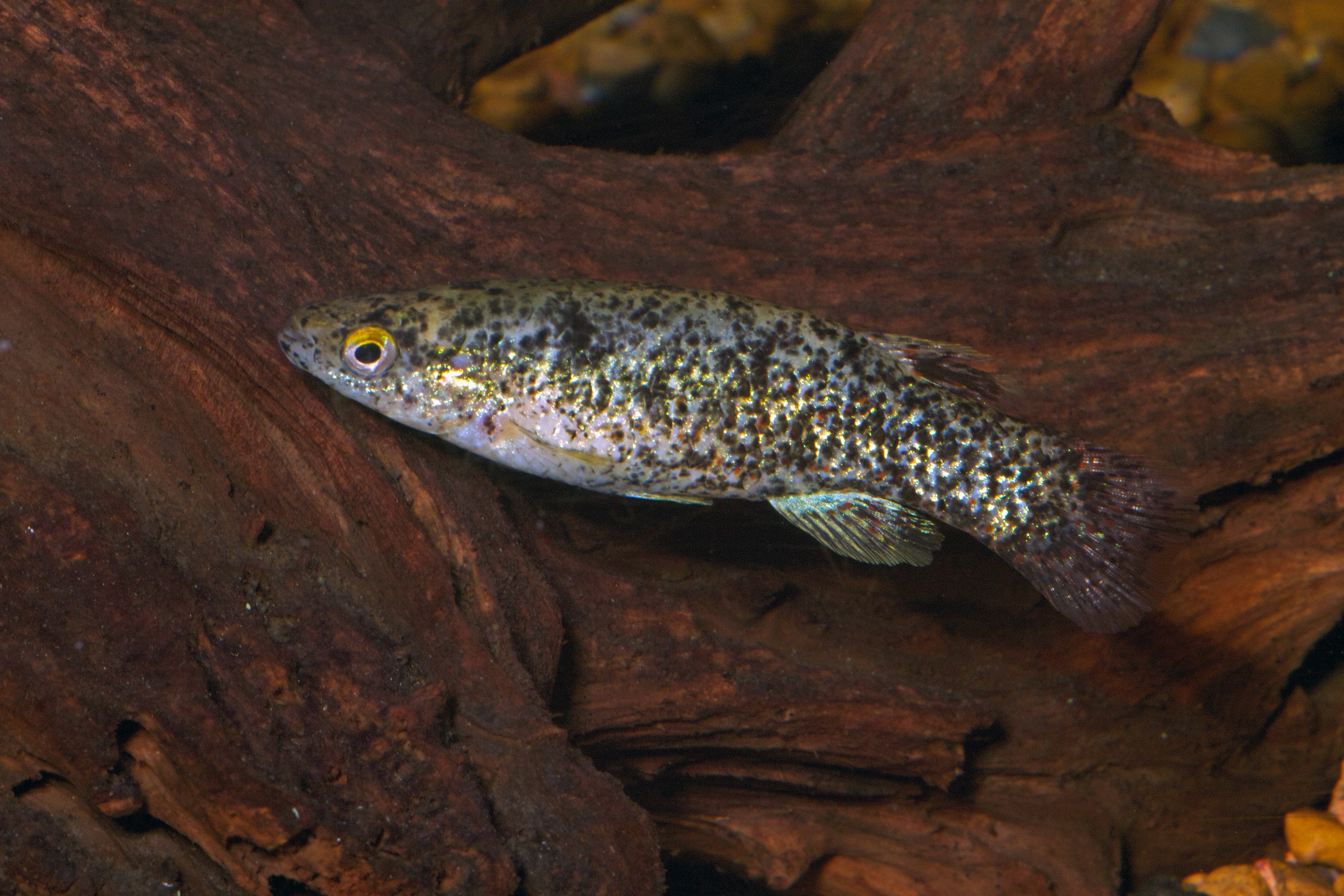
Melanistic form (with black speckles) of Golden topminnow photographed at the National Aquarium in Washington, D.C.

The golden topminnow's diet ranges from aquatic plants to terrestrial invertebrates but consists mostly of aquatic invertebrates. Food habits were studied among many different species of fish throughout Lake Seminole, Florida-Georgia, including the food habits of the golden topminnow. The golden topminnow was observed feeding on small proportions of Macrophytes (aquatic vegetation) and a much wider array of aquatic invertebrates, including Gastropoda (snails/slugs), large quantities of Ostracoda (seed shrimp), Ephemeroptera (mayflies), Coleoptera (water-beetles), and Chironomidae (non-biting midge flies). The golden topminnow's diet does not include vertebrate prey, and the most common food sources are seed shrimp and midge larvae with water beetles and mayflies as minor contributors to its diet. Because of its trophic level position, the golden topminnow also has a wide array of predators that feed on smaller, surface feeding vertebrates. These include, but are not limited to, the largemouth bass Micropterus salmoides, the redear sunfish Lepomis microlophus, the bluegill sunfish Lepomis macrochirus, and the bluespotted sunfish Enneacanthus gloriosus.

The golden topminnow is able to tolerate a range of salinity levels. When observed in 7 and 14 percent salinity, the golden topminnow had a 100 percent mean survival rate, whereas at 21 percent salinity, the rate decreased to 91 percent survival; at 28 percent salinity, the mean survival rate decreased to 24 percent, and at 35 percent salinity the mean survival rate was 0 percent. The salinity tolerances described above account for the golden topminnow's native range throughout coastal waters and brackish waters, allowing for survival and reproduction in a narrow range of salinities. Some major human influences to the golden topminnow population include habitat pollution and the conversion of marshlands and brackish water for agricultural purposes.

== Life cycle ==
The golden topminnow breeds throughout the spring and on into the summer months from April to July, and sometimes as late as September. During courtship the male swims in loops or circles above or beside the female, sometimes pausing to bob his head up and down. Eggs are released individually and deposited on the roots of floating plants or on other fibrous material by the female, where afterwards they are fertilized one at a time by the male. After hatching the larvae rest on leaves or on the bottom and begin to grow quickly reaching maturation after 10 months. At maturation, the golden topminnow becomes slender with a rounded caudal fin and a deep caudal peduncle. The mouth is small and slightly superior and the dorsal fin is set far back on the body and begins posterior to the anal fin origin. A lateral line is absent with 7–9 dorsal rays, 9–11 anal rays, 12–14 pectoral rays and 6 pelvic rays. During the breeding season, males develop prickly contact organs on the side of the body between the dorsal and anal fins, and on the ends of the last few dorsal rays, anal fin, and outermost rays of the pectoral fin. The life expectancy of the golden topminnow is around 2 years.

Ross, S. T. 2001. The Inland Fishes of Mississippi. University Press of Mississippi, Jackson. 624 pp.

== Conservation and management ==
There is no current management plan specifically designed for the golden topminnow due to the fact that it is not listed as an endangered or threatened species.
