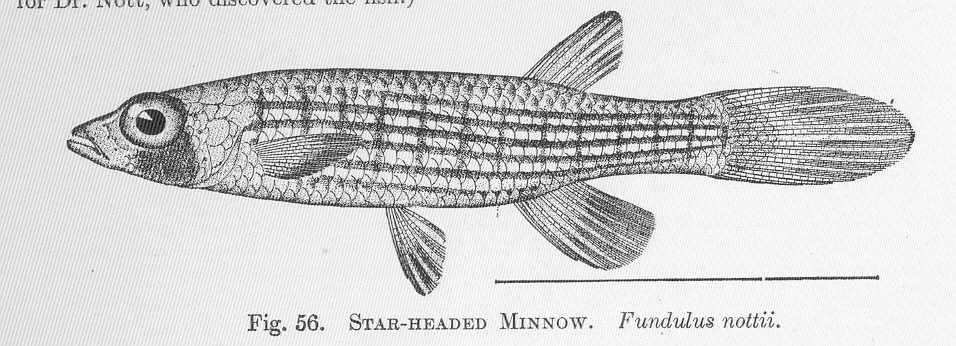

Conservation status
- Least Concern (IUCN 3.1)

Scientific classification
- Kingdom: Animalia
- Phylum: Chordata
- Class: Actinopterygii
- Order: Cyprinodontiformes
- Family: Fundulidae
- Genus: Fundulus
- Species: F. nottii

Binomial name
- Fundulus nottii (Agassiz, 1854)

Synonyms
- Zygonectes nottii Agassiz, 1854; Zygonectes guttatus Agassiz, 1854; Fundulus guttatus (Agassiz, 1854); Zygonectes hieroglyphicus Agassiz, 1854; Fundulus hieroglyphicus (Agassiz, 1854)

= Fundulus nottii =

Species of fish

Fundulus nottii, the bayou topminnow or southern starhead topminnow, is a fish of the family Fundulidae found in the southeastern United States.

== Description ==
It is a small topminnow with a sub-ocular teardrop, a terminal to superior mouth, and a rounded caudal fin. The top of the head is flat, with the large scale (located just anterior to a line between the eyes) overlapped by the pair of scales just behind it. The lateral line is absent, and there are 11 preoperculomandibular pores. The sensory pores are fused. There are 7-8 dorsal rays, 9-10 anal rays, 11-12 pectoral rays, and 6 pelvic rays. During the breeding season males develop prickly contact organs on the anal fin. The Largest reported specimen was 65mm (2.6 in) long. They are sexually dimorphic. Both sexes have a back that is olive green with a thin dorsal stripe, sides that are white or silver with an iridescent blue or silvery overlay, and a dark, iridescent blue-green suborbital teardrop. Males have vertical black bars and irregular horizontal rows of red-brown spots. Females have horizontal flank stripes. Fins have a reddish-brown color.

== Diet ==
Although not much is known about its biology, the bayou topminnow is presumed to feed near the surface, where it consumes drifting organic matter, insects, and other animals associated with the water surface.

== Habitat ==
Bayou topminnows occur in and around shoreline vegetation of clear lakes and ponds, backwaters, and overflow pools of large rivers.

== Reproduction and life cycle ==
As with other topminnows, this species presumably has a spawning season that peaks in May or June, more protracted seasons may occur in some areas. Larvae of this species has not yet been described.

== Distribution ==
The bayou topminnow is found from the Brazos River drainages in Texas east through the Gulf Coastal Plain and the Mobile Basin.

== Species description ==
This species was described by as Zygonectes notti in 1854 by Louis Agassiz with the type locality given as Mobile, Alabama. The specific name honors the surgeon and anthropologist Josiah C. Nott (1804–1873) who sent Aggasiz the type from Mobile.
