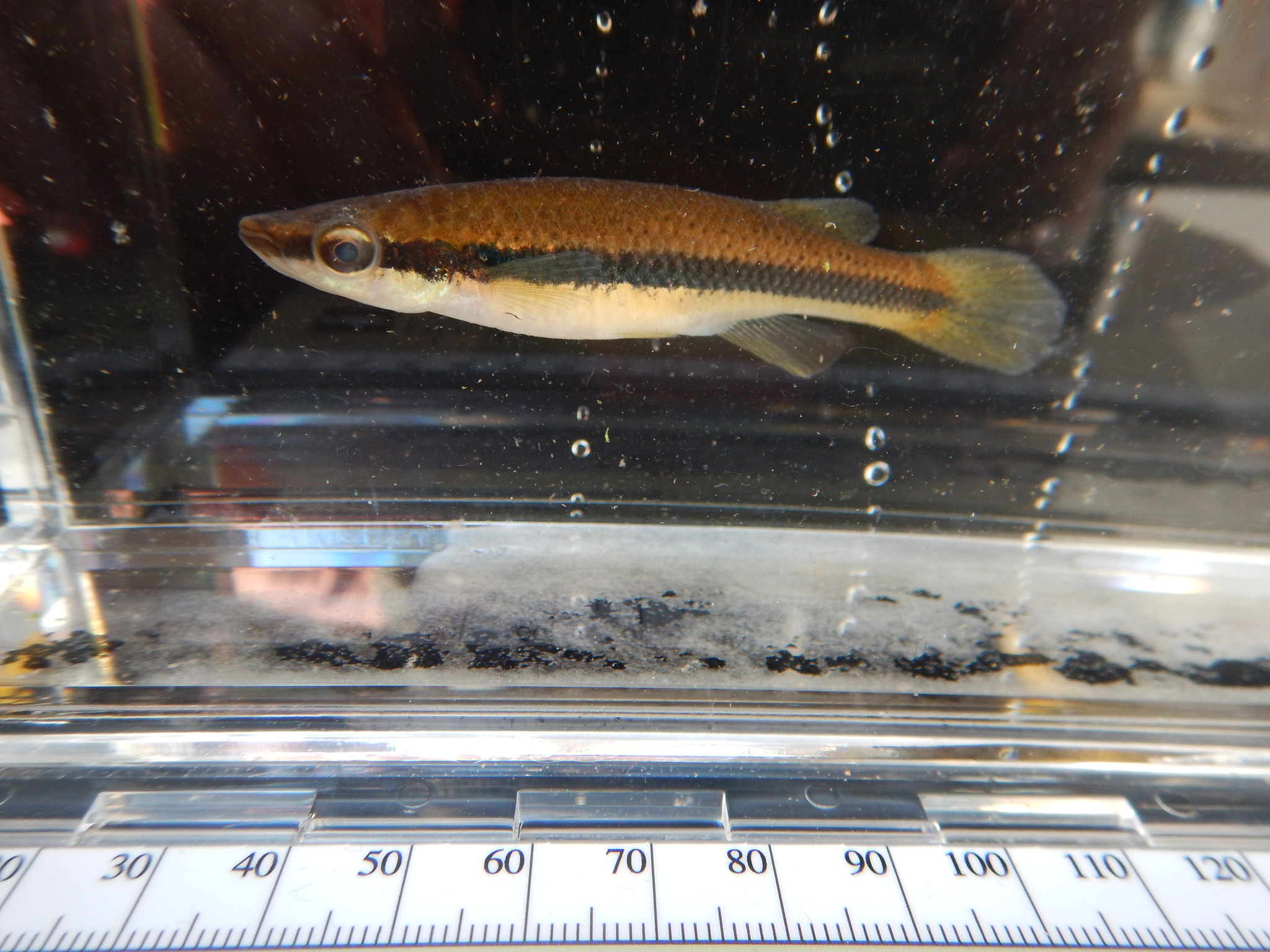

Conservation status
- Least Concern (IUCN 3.1)

Scientific classification
- Kingdom: Animalia
- Phylum: Chordata
- Class: Actinopterygii
- Division: Teleostei
- Order: Cyprinodontiformes
- Family: Fundulidae
- Genus: Fundulus
- Species: F. notatus

Binomial name
- Fundulus notatus (Rafinesque, 1820)

Synonyms
- Semotilus notatus Rafinesque, 1820; Fundulus tenellus Baird & Girard, 1853; Fundulus zonatus (Agassiz, 1854); Fundulus aureus Cope, 1865

= Blackstripe topminnow =

Species of fish

The blackstripe topminnow, Fundulus notatus, is a small freshwater fish in the family Fundulidae, found in central North America.

== Distribution ==
In the United States, it occupies parts of the southern drainage of lakes Erie and Michigan and also the Mississippi drainage basin between Illinois and the Gulf of Mexico. The entire Canadian population of this small freshwater fish lives along a roughly 60 kilometre stretch of the Sydenham River in southwestern Ontario, where its presence was discovered only in 1972. The blackstripe topminnow is a fairly hardy fish although its greatest threats come from changes to its habitat due to human activity.

== Description ==
The blackstripe topminnow gets its name from the horizontal black stripe that runs the length of its body along its sides. The fish has a small mouth that turns slightly upward, and has a flat-topped head with a multi-coloured spot on it. The average length of this fish is between 5 and 7 centimetres (2.0 and 2.8 in). The males and females look distinct from one another. Males have dark vertical bars above and below their stripes, yellow-hued fins, and their dorsal and anal fins are longer and more pointed. Females have no bars, white fins and shorter, more rounded dorsal and anal fins.

== Life history ==
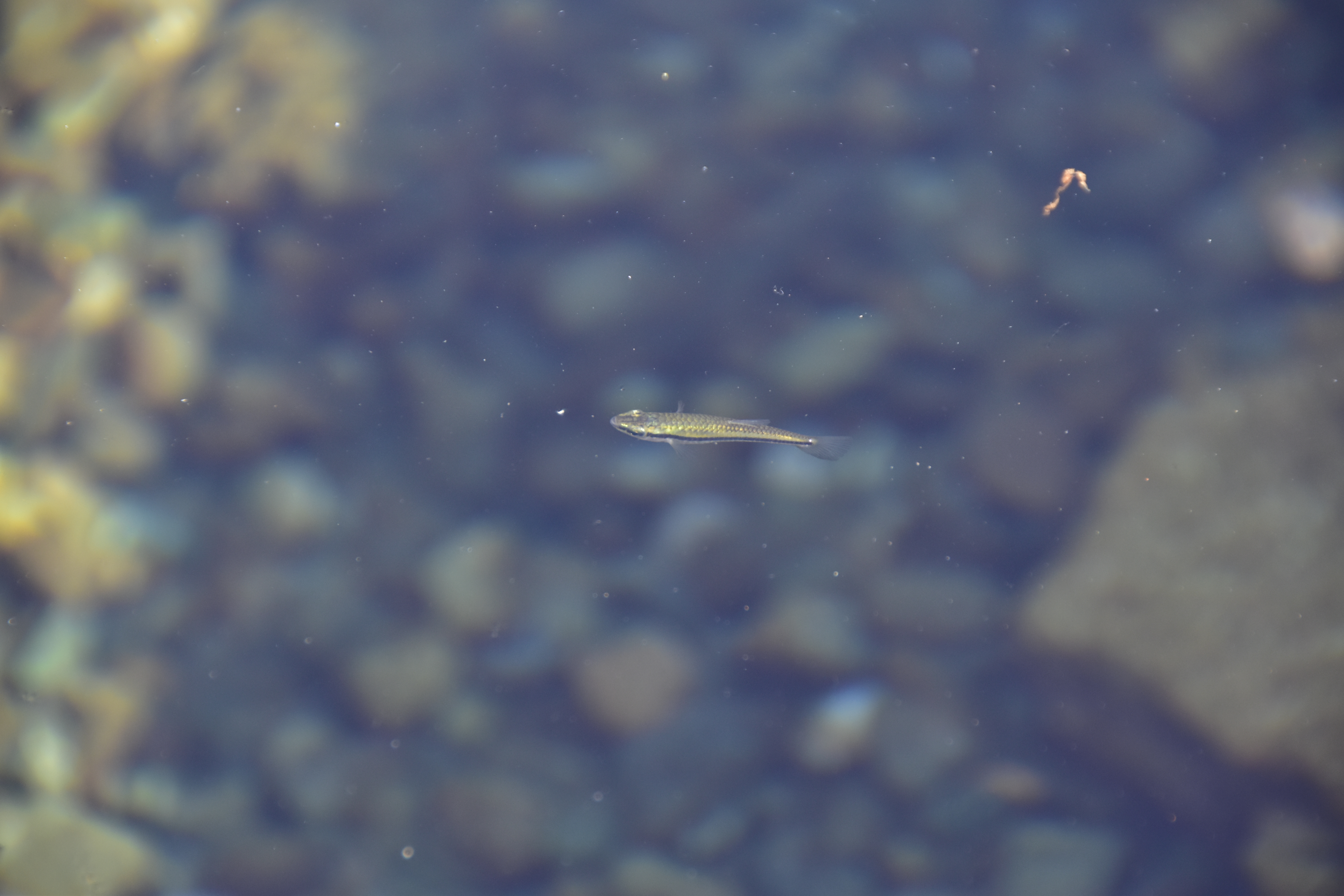
A young Blackstrip Topminnow

Blackstripe topminnows have a lifespan of around two to three years. They are normally found in water with a slow current where there is vegetation along the river bank which provides a good amount of cover along the waters edge. They tend to stay near the surface in summer and feed on insects. They also eat insect larvae in the water, as well as tiny molluscs, spiders and crustaceans. In the winter, they retreat to deeper water. Spawning occurs between May and August. Females lay 20 to 30 eggs; these are fertilized and tucked away in underwater vegetation one at a time by the males.

== Conservation ==
Although this population in Canada seems to have remained stable in recent years, it faces several environmental risks. This species is dependent on both aquatic and marginal vegetation which is important as a source of insects for them to prey on. Livestock threaten this vegetation either by destroying by trampling or by grazing. The drainage of wetlands can cause the flow of creeks and streams to be altered, possibly affecting the magnitude and viability of local populations of blackstripe. Water abstraction for irrigation is another threat for this fish, especially when there is low water or drought. Oil seepage from equipment and vehicles could harm the blackstripe topminnow because of its habit of feeding at the surface of the water where slicks occur.

First designated as a species of Special Concern by COSEWIC (Committee on the Status of Endangered Wildlife in Canada) in April 1985, its status was re-examined and confirmed in May 2001 and May 2012. The blackstripe topminnow is now listed in Canada under the federal Species at Risk Act (SARA). As well, the federal Fisheries Act prohibits destruction of fish habitat. The blackstripe topminnow is also one of many species covered by the Sydenham River Recovery strategy. The Sydenham River Recovery Strategy, completed in 2003, was the first recovery strategy in Canada to use an ecosystem approach for aquatic species. The blackstripe topminnow is now being protected as part of a larger plan to return the Sydenham River's ecosystem to health.
