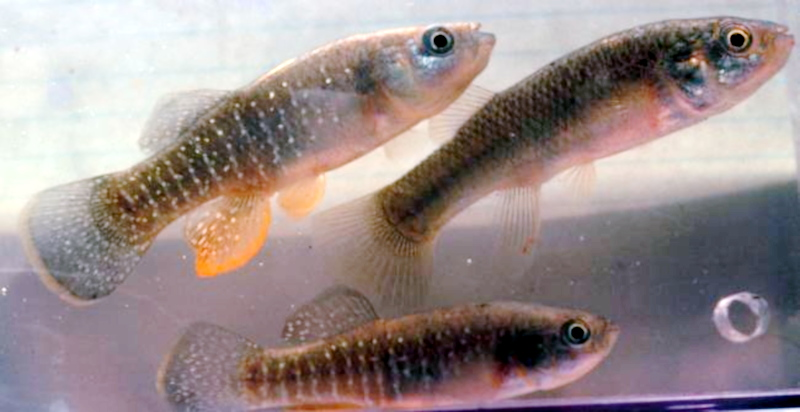
- Mummichog; Fundulus heteroclitus

Scientific classification
- Kingdom: Animalia
- Phylum: Chordata
- Class: Actinopterygii
- Division: Teleostei
- Order: Cyprinodontiformes
- Suborder: Cyprinodontoidei
- Family: Fundulidae; Günther, 1866

Genera
- see text

= Fundulidae =

Family of fishes

Fundulidae is the family of topminnows and North American killifishes.

== Distribution ==
The 46 species are native to North America as far south as Yucatan, and to the islands of Bermuda and Cuba, occurring in both freshwater and marine environments.

== Description ==
Most members of the family are small. While the giant killifish (Fundulus grandissimus) and northern studfish (Fundulus catenatus) can reach 20 cm (7.9 in) in length, most species are under 10 cm in length.

The distinguishing characteristic of the family is the maxillary bone, which is twisted instead of being straight.

While many species of the Fundulidae are listed as not threatened, there are some that are listed as endangered because of their environment. Many common species of the Fundulidae live in North America such as the United States and Mexico. They live in different ecosystem such as costal marshes, lagoons, rivers, streams with high elevations with clear water, and muddy conditions at lower elevation. They are able to adapt to different conditions which is increasing their survival rate.

== Genera ==
There are three genera in the family Fundulidae:

- Fundulus Lacépède 1803
- Leptolucania Myers, 1924
- Lucania Girard, 1859
