= List of fishes of Texas =

Texas has an exceptional diversity of marine and freshwater fish found in its waters. the following is a list of species, both native and introduced.

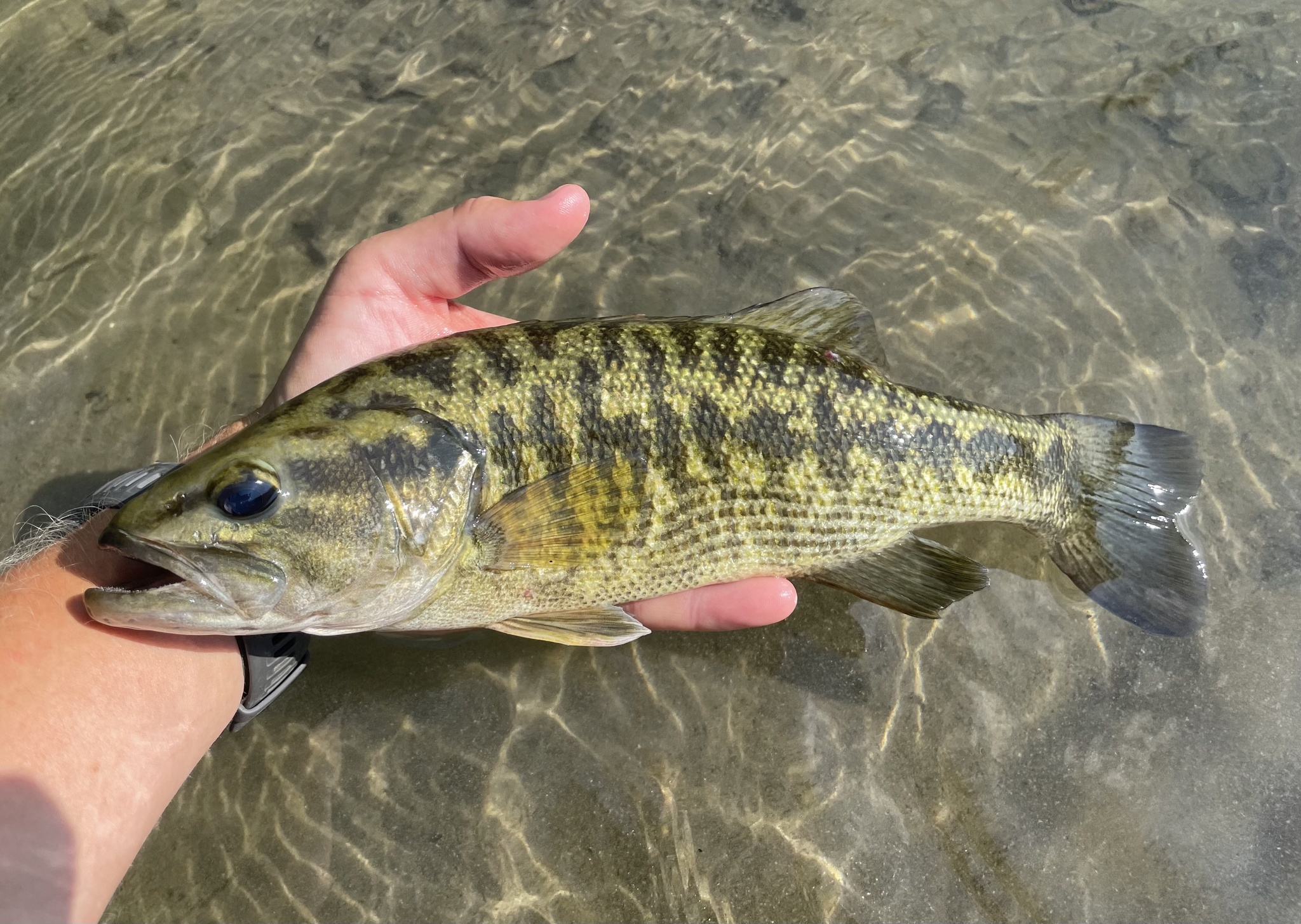
Guadalupe Bass, texas's state freshwater fish

== Native Freshwater species ==
=== Order Acipenseriformes ===
==== Family Acipenseridae (Sturgeons) ====
- Genus Acipenser
  - Acipenser oxyrinchus desotoi (Gulf Sturgeon) — Vulnerable, anadromous
- Genus Scaphirhynchus
  - Scaphirhynchus platorynchus (Shovelnose Sturgeon)
  - Scaphirhynchus albus (Pallid Sturgeon) — Endangered

=== Order Lepisosteiformes ===
==== Family Lepisosteidae (Gars) ====
- Genus Atractosteus
  - Atractosteus spatula (Alligator Gar)
- Genus Lepisosteus
  - Lepisosteus oculatus (Spotted Gar)
  - Lepisosteus osseus (Longnose Gar)
  - Lepisosteus platostomus (Shortnose Gar)

=== Order Amiiformes ===
==== Family Amiidae (Bowfins) ====
- Genus Amia
  - Amia calva (Bowfin)

=== Order Cypriniformes ===
==== Family Cyprinidae (Carps and Minnows) ====
- Genus Campostoma
  - Campostoma anomalum (Central Stoneroller)
  - Campostoma oligolepis (Largescale Stoneroller)
- Genus Clinostomus
  - Clinostomus funduloides (Rosyside Dace)
- Genus Codoma
  - Codoma ornata (Ornate Shiner)
- Genus Cyprinella
  - Cyprinella lutrensis (Red Shiner)
  - Cyprinella proserpina (Proserpine Shiner)
  - Cyprinella venusta (Blacktail Shiner)
- Genus Ericymba
  - Ericymba buccata (Silverjaw Minnow)
- Genus Erimyzon
  - Erimyzon oblongus (Creek Chubsucker)
  - Erimyzon tenuis (Sharpfin Chubsucker)
- Genus Hybognathus
  - Hybognathus nuchalis (Mississippi Silvery Minnow)
- Genus Hybopsis
  - Hybopsis amblops (Bigeye Chub) — Extirpated?
- Genus Luxilus
  - Luxilus chrysocephalus (Striped Shiner)
- Genus Lythrurus
  - Lythrurus fumeus (Ribbon Shiner)
  - Lythrurus umbratilis (Redfin Shiner)
- Genus Macrhybopsis
  - Macrhybopsis aestivalis (Speckled Chub)
  - Macrhybopsis australis (Prairie Chub)
  - Macrhybopsis hyostoma (Shoal Chub)
  - Macrhybopsis marconis (Burrhead Chub)
  - Macrhybopsis storeriana (Silver Chub)
- Genus Nocomis
  - Nocomis asper (Redspot Chub)
- Genus Notemigonus
  - Notemigonus crysoleucas (Golden Shiner)
- Genus Notropis
  - Notropis amabilis (Texas Shiner)
  - Notropis amecae (Ameca Shiner) — Extirpated?
  - Notropis atrocaudalis (Blackspot Shiner)
  - Notropis bairdi (Red River Shiner)
  - Notropis buccula (Smalleye Shiner) — Threatened
  - Notropis buchanani (Ghost Shiner)
  - Notropis chalybaeus (Ironcolor Shiner)
  - Notropis chihuahua (Chihuahua Shiner)
  - Notropis girardi (Arkansas River Shiner) — Threatened
  - Notropis jemezanus (Rio Grande Shiner)
  - Notropis orca (Phantom Shiner) — Extinct
  - Notropis ortenburgeri (Kiamichi Shiner)
  - Notropis oxyrhynchus (Sharpnose Shiner) — Threatened
  - Notropis potteri (Chub Shiner)
  - Notropis shumardi (Silverband Shiner)
  - Notropis simus (Bluntnose Shiner) — Extinct
  - Notropis stramineus (Sand Shiner)
  - Notropis telescopus (Telescope Shiner)
  - Notropis texanus (Weed Shiner)
  - Notropis volucellus (Mimic Shiner)
- Genus Opsopoeodus
  - Opsopoeodus emiliae (Pugnose Minnow)
- Genus Phenacobius
  - Phenacobius mirabilis (Suckermouth Minnow)
- Genus Pimephales
  - Pimephales vigilax (Bullhead Minnow)
- Genus Plagopterus
  - Plagopterus argentissimus (Woundfin) — Extirpated?
- Genus Pteronotropis
  - Pteronotropis hubbsi (Bluehead Shiner)
- Genus Rhinichthys
  - Rhinichthys cataractae (Longnose Dace)
- Genus Richardsonius
  - Richardsonius balteatus (Redside Shiner) — Extirpated?
- Genus Semotilus
  - Semotilus atromaculatus (Creek Chub)
- Genus Tampichthys
  - Tampichthys ipni (Largemouth Shiner)

=== Order Catostomiformes ===
==== Family Catostomidae (Suckers) ====
- Genus Carpiodes
  - Carpiodes carpio (River Carpsucker)
  - Carpiodes cyprinus (Quillback)
  - Carpiodes velifer (Highfin Carpsucker)
- Genus Cycleptus
  - Cycleptus elongatus (Blue Sucker) — Vulnerable
- Genus Hypentelium
  - Hypentelium nigricans (Northern Hogsucker)
- Genus Ictiobus
  - Ictiobus bubalus (Smallmouth Buffalo)
  - Ictiobus cyprinellus (Bigmouth Buffalo)
  - Ictiobus niger (Black Buffalo)
- Genus Minytrema
  - Minytrema melanops (Spotted Sucker)
- Genus Moxostoma
  - Moxostoma anisurum (Silver Redhorse)
  - Moxostoma austrinum (Mexican Redhorse)
  - Moxostoma carinatum (River Redhorse)
  - Moxostoma congestum (Gray Redhorse)
  - Moxostoma duquesnei (Black Redhorse)
  - Moxostoma erythrurum (Golden Redhorse)
  - Moxostoma poecilurum (Blacktail Redhorse)
  - Moxostoma valenciennesi (Greater Redhorse) — Extirpated?

=== Order Siluriformes ===
==== Family Ictaluridae (North American Catfishes) ====
- Genus Ameiurus
  - Ameiurus melas (Black Bullhead)
  - Ameiurus natalis (Yellow Bullhead)
  - Ameiurus nebulosus (Brown Bullhead) — Rare
- Genus Ictalurus
  - Ictalurus furcatus (Blue Catfish)
  - Ictalurus lupus (Headwater Catfish)
  - Ictalurus punctatus (Channel Catfish)
- Genus Noturus
  - Noturus exilis (Slender Madtom)
  - Noturus flavus (Stonecat)
  - Noturus gyrinus (Tadpole Madtom)
  - Noturus lacustris (Orangefin Madtom) — Extirpated?
  - Noturus leptacanthus (Speckled Madtom)
  - Noturus miurus (Brindled Madtom)
  - Noturus nocturnus (Freckled Madtom)
  - Noturus phaeus (Brown Madtom)
  - Noturus taylori (Caddo Madtom)
- Genus Pylodictis
  - Pylodictis olivaris (Flathead Catfish)

=== Order Esociformes ===
==== Family Esocidae (Pikes) ====
- Genus Esox
  - Esox americanus (Redfin Pickerel)
  - Esox lucius (Northern Pike) — Extirpated?
  - Esox masquinongy (Muskellunge) — Introduced

=== Order Osmeriformes ===
==== Family Osmeridae (Smelts) ====
- Genus Osmerus
  - Osmerus mordax (Rainbow Smelt) — Introduced

=== Order Cyprinodontiformes ===
==== Family Fundulidae (Topminnows) ====
- Genus Adinia
  - Adinia xenica (Diamond Killifish)
- Genus Fundulus
  - Fundulus blairae (Western Starhead Topminnow)
  - Fundulus chrysotus (Golden Topminnow)
  - Fundulus dispar (Starhead Topminnow)
  - Fundulus grandis (Gulf Killifish)
  - Fundulus julisia (Barrens Topminnow) — Introduced
  - Fundulus kansae (Northern Plains Killifish)
  - Fundulus notatus (Blackstripe Topminnow)
  - Fundulus nottii (Bayou Topminnow)
  - Fundulus olivaceus (Blackspotted Topminnow)
  - Fundulus pulvereus (Bayou Killifish)
  - Fundulus sciadicus (Plains Topminnow)
  - Fundulus zebrinus (Plains Killifish)

==== Family Profundulidae (Middle American Killifishes) ====
- Genus Profundulus
  - Profundulus candalarius (Banderilla) — Extirpated?
  - Profundulus punctatus (Oaxaca Killifish) — Extirpated?

==== Family Goodeidae (Splitfins) ====
- Genus Characodon
  - Characodon garmani (Parras Pupfish) — Extinct
- Genus Goodea
  - Goodea atripinnis (Blackfin Goodea) — Extirpated?

==== Family Rivulidae (New World Rivulines) ====
- Genus Rivulus
  - Rivulus marmoratus (Mangrove Rivulus) — Rare vagrant

==== Family Poeciliidae (Livebearers) ====
- Genus Gambusia
  - Gambusia affinis (Western Mosquitofish)
  - Gambusia amistadensis (Amistad Gambusia) — Extinct
  - Gambusia clarkhubbsi (San Felipe Gambusia)
  - Gambusia gaigei (Big Bend Gambusia) — Endangered
  - Gambusia geiseri (Largespring Gambusia)
  - Gambusia georgei (San Marcos Gambusia) — Extinct
  - Gambusia heterochir (Clear Creek Gambusia) — Endangered
  - Gambusia hispaniolae (Dominican Gambusia) — Introduced
  - Gambusia hurtadoi (Crescent Gambusia)
  - Gambusia krumholzi (Spotfin Gambusia)
  - Gambusia nobilis (Pecos Gambusia) — Endangered
  - Gambusia senilis (Blotched Gambusia)
- Genus Heterandria
  - Heterandria formosa (Least Killifish)
- Genus Poecilia
  - Poecilia formosa (Amazon Molly)
  - Poecilia latipinna (Sailfin Molly)
  - Poecilia mexicana (Shortfin Molly)
  - Poecilia reticulata (Guppy) — Introduced
- Genus Xiphophorus
  - Xiphophorus couchianus (Monterrey Platyfish) — Extinct in wild
  - Xiphophorus gordoni (Mountain Platyfish)
  - Xiphophorus meyeri (Marbled Swordtail) — Extinct?
  - Xiphophorus variatus (Variable Platyfish)

=== Order Beloniformes ===
==== Family Belonidae (Needlefishes) ====
- Genus Strongylura
  - Strongylura marina (Atlantic Needlefish) — Brackish/Marine
  - Strongylura notata (Redfin Needlefish) — Brackish/Marine
  - Strongylura timucu (Timucu) — Brackish/Marine

==== Family Hemiramphidae (Halfbeaks) ====
- Genus Hyporhamphus
  - Hyporhamphus meeki (False Silverstripe Halfbeak) — Brackish/Marine
  - Hyporhamphus unifasciatus (Common Halfbeak) — Brackish/Marine

=== Order Synbranchiformes ===
==== Family Synbranchidae (Swamp Eels) ====
- Genus Ophisternon
  - Ophisternon infernale (Blind Swamp Eel) — Cave-dwelling, endangered

=== Order Gasterosteiformes ===
==== Family Gasterosteidae (Sticklebacks) ====
- Genus Gasterosteus
  - Gasterosteus aculeatus (Threespine Stickleback) — Rare, introduced?

=== Order Perciformes ===
==== Family Centrarchidae (Sunfishes) ====
- Genus Ambloplites
  - Ambloplites ariommus (Shadow Bass)
  - Ambloplites rupestris (Rock Bass) — Introduced
- Genus Lepomis
  - Lepomis auritus (Redbreast Sunfish)
  - Lepomis cyanellus (Green Sunfish)
  - Lepomis gulosus (Warmouth)
  - Lepomis humilis (Orangespotted Sunfish)
  - Lepomis macrochirus (Bluegill)
  - Lepomis marginatus (Dollar Sunfish)
  - Lepomis megalotis (Longear Sunfish)
  - Lepomis microlophus (Redear Sunfish)
  - Lepomis miniatus (Redspotted Sunfish)
  - Lepomis symmetricus (Bantam Sunfish)
- Genus Micropterus
  - Micropterus cataractae (Shoal Bass) — Extirpated?
  - Micropterus coosae (Redeye Bass) — Introduced
  - Micropterus dolomieu (Smallmouth Bass)
  - Micropterus floridanus (Florida Largemouth Bass) — Introduced
  - Micropterus punctulatus (Spotted Bass)
  - Micropterus salmoides (Largemouth Bass)
  - Micropterus treculii (Guadalupe Bass)
  - Micropterus warriorensis (Warrior Bass) — Introduced
- Genus Pomoxis
  - Pomoxis annularis (White Crappie)
  - Pomoxis nigromaculatus (Black Crappie)

==== Family Percidae (Perches and Darters) ====
- Genus Ammocrypta
  - Ammocrypta clara (Western Sand Darter)
  - Ammocrypta vivax (Scaly Sand Darter)
- Genus Crystallaria
  - Crystallaria asprella (Crystal Darter)
- Genus Etheostoma
  - Etheostoma asprigene (Mud Darter)
  - Etheostoma australe (Conchos Darter) — Extirpated?
  - Etheostoma chlorosomum (Bluntnose Darter)
  - Etheostoma collettei (Chicken Ranch Darter) — Threatened
  - Etheostoma fonticola (Fountain Darter) — Endangered
  - Etheostoma gracile (Slough Darter)
  - Etheostoma histrio (Harlequin Darter)
  - Etheostoma lepidum (Greenthroat Darter)
  - Etheostoma lugoi (Tufa Darter)
  - Etheostoma moorei (Yellowcheek Darter) — Endangered
  - Etheostoma pottsii (Chihuahuan Darter) — Extirpated?
  - Etheostoma proeliare (Cypress Darter)
  - Etheostoma radiosum (Orangebelly Darter)
  - Etheostoma segrex (Salado Darter) — Threatened
  - Etheostoma spectabile (Orangethroat Darter)
  - Etheostoma swaini (Gulf Darter)
  - Etheostoma tecumsehi (Shawnee Darter) — Extirpated?
  - Etheostoma zonale (Banded Darter)
- Genus Perca
  - Perca flavescens (Yellow Perch) — Rare, possibly introduced
- Genus Percina
  - Percina caprodes (Logperch)
  - Percina carbonaria (Texas Logperch)
  - Percina copelandi (Channel Darter)
  - Percina macrolepida (Bigscale Logperch)
  - Percina nasuta (Longnose Darter)
  - Percina pantherina (Leopard Darter) — Threatened
  - Percina phoxocephala (Slenderhead Darter)
  - Percina sciera (Dusky Darter)
  - Percina shumardi (River Darter)
  - Percina sipsi (Bankhead Darter) — Extirpated?
  - Percina vigil (Saddleback Darter)

==== Family Sciaenidae (Drums) ====
- Genus Aplodinotus
  - Aplodinotus grunniens (Freshwater Drum)

==== Family Elassomatidae (Pygmy Sunfishes) ====
- Genus Elassoma
  - Elassoma zonatum (Banded Pygmy Sunfish)

==== Family Cichlidae (Cichlids) ====
- Genus Herichthys
  - Herichthys cyanoguttatus (Rio Grande Cichlid) — Native to lower Rio Grande, introduced elsewhere
  - Herichthys deppii (Nautla Cichlid) — Introduced
  - Herichthys minckleyi (Minkley's Cichlid) — Cuatro Ciénegas, Mexico (near TX border)
  - Herichthys tamasopoensis (Tamasopo Cichlid) — Introduced
- Genus Oreochromis
  - Oreochromis aureus (Blue Tilapia) — Introduced
  - Oreochromis mossambicus (Mozambique Tilapia) — Introduced
  - Oreochromis niloticus (Nile Tilapia) — Introduced
- Genus Parachromis
  - Parachromis managuensis (Jaguar Guapote) — Introduced
- Genus Thorichthys
  - Thorichthys aureus (Blue-eyed Cichlid) — Introduced
  - Thorichthys meeki (Firemouth Cichlid) — Introduced
- Genus Vieja
  - Vieja fenestrata (Redspotted Cichlid) — Introduced
  - Vieja maculicauda (Black Belt Cichlid) — Introduced

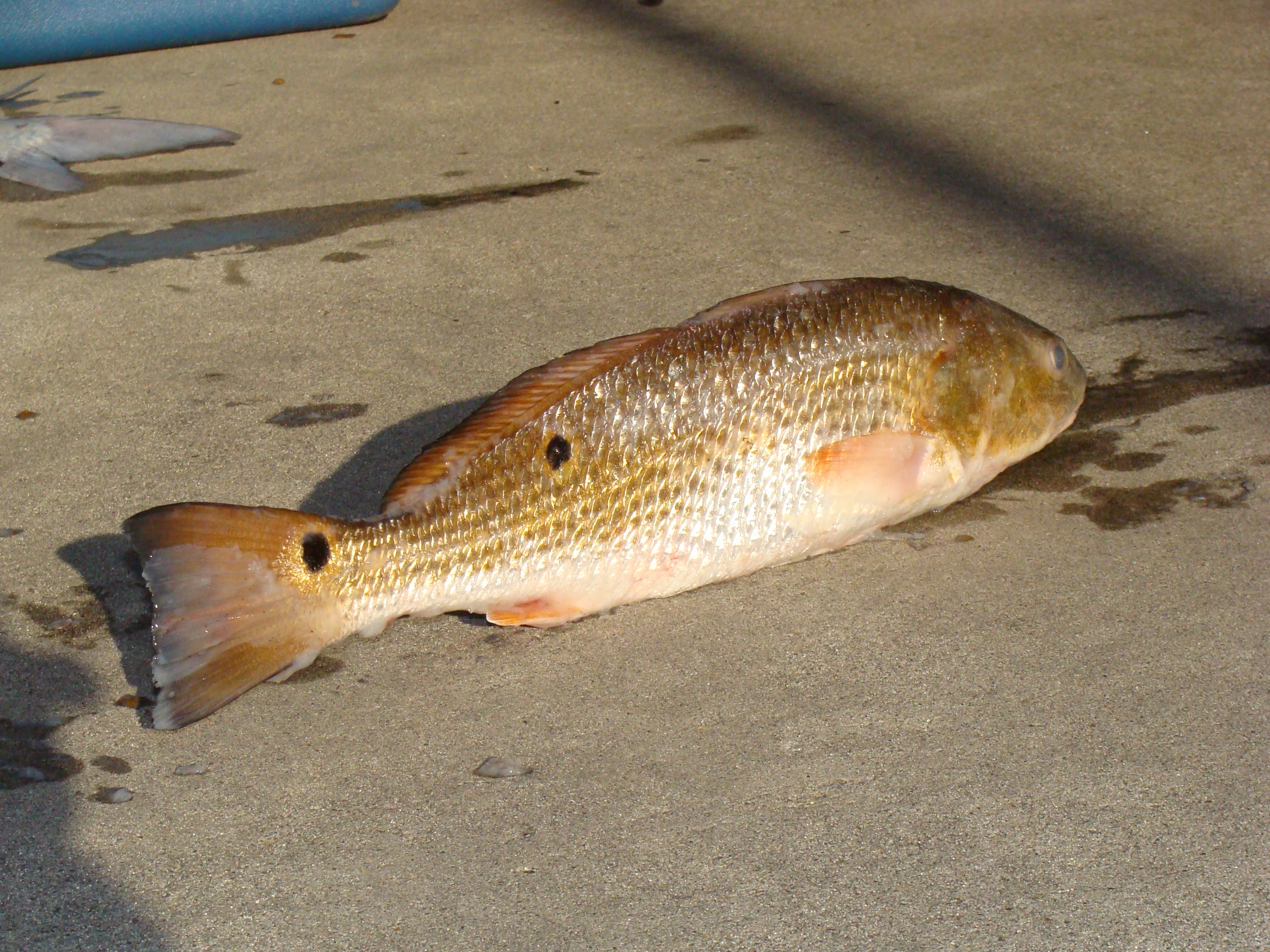
Red Drum, Texas's state saltwater fish

== Native Saltwater species ==
=== Class Myxini (Hagfishes) ===
==== Order Myxiniformes ====
===== Family Myxinidae (Hagfishes) =====
- Genus Eptatretus
  - Eptatretus minor (Black Hagfish) — Uncommon, deep water
  - Eptatretus springeri (Gulf Hagfish)
- Genus Myxine
  - Myxine mcmillanae (McMillan's Hagfish) — Deep water

=== Class Petromyzonti (Lampreys) ===
==== Order Petromyzontiformes ====
===== Family Petromyzontidae (Northern Lampreys) =====
- Genus Petromyzon
  - Petromyzon marinus (Sea Lamprey) — Anadromous, rare in Gulf

=== Class Chondrichthyes (Cartilaginous Fishes) ===
==== Order Hexanchiformes ====
===== Family Hexanchidae (Cow Sharks) =====
- Genus Heptranchias
  - Heptranchias perlo (Sharpnose Sevengill Shark) — Rare, deep water
- Genus Hexanchus
  - Hexanchus griseus (Bluntnose Sixgill Shark) — Deep water
  - Hexanchus nakamurai (Bigeye Sixgill Shark) — Deep water
- Genus Notorynchus
  - Notorynchus cepedianus (Broadnose Sevengill Shark) — Rare

==== Order Echinorhiniformes ====
===== Family Echinorhinidae (Bramble Sharks) =====
- Genus Echinorhinus
  - Echinorhinus brucus (Bramble Shark) — Rare, deep water

==== Order Squaliformes ====
===== Family Centrophoridae (Gulper Sharks) =====
- Genus Centrophorus
  - Centrophorus granulosus (Gulper Shark) — Deep water
  - Centrophorus uyato (Little Gulper Shark) — Deep water
- Genus Deania
  - Deania calcea (Birdbeak Dogfish) — Deep water

===== Family Dalatiidae (Kitefin Sharks) =====
- Genus Dalatias
  - Dalatias licha (Kitefin Shark) — Deep water
- Genus Euprotomicroides
  - Euprotomicroides zantedeschia (Taillight Shark) — Very rare, deep water
- Genus Euprotomicrus
  - Euprotomicrus bispinatus (Pygmy Shark) — Deep water
- Genus Heteroscymnoides
  - Heteroscymnoides marleyi (Longnose Pygmy Shark) — Deep water
- Genus Isistius
  - Isistius brasiliensis (Cookiecutter Shark) — Deep water
  - Isistius plutodus (Largetooth Cookiecutter Shark) — Deep water
- Genus Mollisquama
  - Mollisquama mississippiensis (American Pocket Shark) — Very rare, deep water
- Genus Squaliolus
  - Squaliolus laticaudus (Spined Pygmy Shark) — Deep water

===== Family Etmopteridae (Lanternsharks) =====
- Genus Etmopterus
  - Etmopterus bigelowi (Blurred Lanternshark) — Deep water
  - Etmopterus bullisi (Lined Lanternshark) — Deep water
  - Etmopterus gracilispinis (Broadbanded Lanternshark) — Deep water
  - Etmopterus hillianus (Caribbean Lanternshark) — Deep water
  - Etmopterus perryi (Dwarf Lanternshark) — Deep water
  - Etmopterus pusillus (Smooth Lanternshark) — Deep water
  - Etmopterus schultzi (Fringefin Lanternshark) — Deep water
  - Etmopterus virens (Green Lanternshark) — Deep water

===== Family Somniosidae (Sleeper Sharks) =====
- Genus Centroselachus
  - Centroselachus crepidater (Longnose Velvet Dogfish) — Deep water
- Genus Zameus
  - Zameus squamulosus (Velvet Dogfish) — Deep water

===== Family Squalidae (Dogfish Sharks) =====
- Genus Cirrhigaleus
  - Cirrhigaleus asper (Roughskin Spurdog) — Deep water
- Genus Squalus
  - Squalus acanthias (Spiny Dogfish) — Uncommon
  - Squalus blainville (Longnose Spurdog) — Deep water
  - Squalus cubensis (Cuban Dogfish)
  - Squalus mahia (Shortnose Spurdog) — Deep water
  - Squalus megalops (Shortnose Spurdog) — Deep water
  - Squalus mitsukurii (Shortspine Spurdog) — Deep water

==== Order Pristiophoriformes ====
===== Family Pristiophoridae (Sawsharks) =====
- Genus Pliotrema
  - Pliotrema warreni (Sixgill Sawshark) — Very rare
- Genus Pristiophorus
  - Pristiophorus schroederi (Bahamas Sawshark) — Very rare, deep water

==== Order Squatiniformes ====
===== Family Squatinidae (Angel Sharks) =====
- Genus Squatina
  - Squatina dumeril (Sand Devil)
  - Squatina heteroptera (Gulf Angel Shark) — Uncommon
  - Squatina occulta (Hidden Angel Shark) — Uncommon

==== Order Heterodontiformes ====
===== Family Heterodontidae (Bullhead Sharks) =====
- Genus Heterodontus
  - Heterodontus mexicanus (Mexican Hornshark) — Rare

==== Order Orectolobiformes ====
===== Family Ginglymostomatidae (Nurse Sharks) =====
- Genus Ginglymostoma
  - Ginglymostoma cirratum (Nurse Shark)
- Genus Nebrius
  - Nebrius ferrugineus (Tawny Nurse Shark) — Very rare

===== Family Rhincodontidae (Whale Sharks) =====
- Genus Rhincodon
  - Rhincodon typus (Whale Shark) — Seasonal visitor

===== Family Stegostomatidae (Zebra Sharks) =====
- Genus Stegostoma
  - Stegostoma tigrinum (Zebra Shark) — Very rare vagrant

===== Family Parascylliidae (Collared Carpetsharks) =====
- Genus Cirrhoscyllium
  - Cirrhoscyllium expolitum (Barbelthroat Carpetshark) — Very rare

===== Family Brachaeluridae (Blind Sharks) =====
- Genus Brachaelurus
  - Brachaelurus colcloughi (Bluegrey Carpetshark) — Very rare

==== Order Lamniformes ====
===== Family Alopiidae (Thresher Sharks) =====
- Genus Alopias
  - Alopias superciliosus (Bigeye Thresher)
  - Alopias vulpinus (Common Thresher)

===== Family Cetorhinidae (Basking Sharks) =====
- Genus Cetorhinus
  - Cetorhinus maximus (Basking Shark) — Rare visitor

===== Family Lamnidae (Mackerel Sharks) =====
- Genus Carcharodon
  - Carcharodon carcharias (Great White Shark) — Uncommon
- Genus Isurus
  - Isurus oxyrinchus (Shortfin Mako)
  - Isurus paucus (Longfin Mako) — Rare
- Genus Lamna
  - Lamna nasus (Porbeagle) — Rare

===== Family Megachasmidae (Megamouth Sharks) =====
- Genus Megachasma
  - Megachasma pelagios (Megamouth Shark) — Very rare

===== Family Mitsukurinidae (Goblin Sharks) =====
- Genus Mitsukurina
  - Mitsukurina owstoni (Goblin Shark) — Deep water, rare

===== Family Odontaspididae (Sand Tiger Sharks) =====
- Genus Carcharias
  - Carcharias taurus (Sand Tiger Shark)
- Genus Odontaspis
  - Odontaspis ferox (Smalltooth Sand Tiger) — Deep water
  - Odontaspis noronhai (Bigeye Sand Tiger) — Deep water

===== Family Pseudocarchariidae (Crocodile Sharks) =====
- Genus Pseudocarcharias
  - Pseudocarcharias kamoharai (Crocodile Shark) — Rare, deep water

== Actinopterygii ==
=== Anguilliformes ===
==== Anguillidae ====
- Genus Anguilla
  - Anguilla rostrata (American eel)

==== Congridae ====
- Genus Conger
  - Conger oceanicus (American conger)

==== Muraenidae ====
- Genus Gymnothorax
  - Gymnothorax funebris (Green moray)
  - Gymnothorax moringa (Spotted moray)

=== Clupeiformes ===
==== Clupeidae ====
- Genus Brevoortia
  - Brevoortia patronus (Gulf menhaden)
  - Brevoortia tyrannus (Atlantic menhaden)
- Genus Sardinella
  - Sardinella aurita (Spanish sardine)
- Genus Opisthonema
  - Opisthonema oglinum (Atlantic thread herring)

==== Engraulidae ====
- Genus Anchoa
  - Anchoa mitchilli (Bay anchovy)

=== Siluriformes ===
==== Ariidae ====
- Genus Ariopsis
  - Ariopsis felis (Hardhead catfish)
- Genus Bagre
  - Bagre marinus (Gafftopsail catfish)

=== Aulopiformes ===
==== Synodontidae ====
- Genus Synodus
  - Synodus foetens (Inshore lizardfish)

=== Gadiformes ===
==== Gadidae ====
- Genus Gadus
  - Gadus morhua (Atlantic cod)

==== Phycidae ====
- Genus Urophycis
  - Urophycis chuss (Red hake)

=== Batrachoidiformes ===
==== Batrachoididae ====
- Genus Opsanus
  - Opsanus tau (Oyster toadfish)

=== Lophiiformes ===
==== Lophiidae ====
- Genus Lophius
  - Lophius americanus (Goosefish)

==== Antennariidae ====
- Genus Histrio
  - Histrio histrio (Sargassumfish)

==== Ogcocephalidae ====
- Genus Halieutichthys
  - Halieutichthys aculeatus (Pancake batfish)

=== Acanthuriformes ===
==== Acanthuridae ====
- Genus Acanthurus
  - Acanthurus chirurgus (Doctorfish tang)
  - Acanthurus coeruleus (Atlantic blue tang)
  - Acanthurus tractus (Five-band surgeonfish)

==== Chaetodontidae ====
- Genus Chaetodon
  - Chaetodon capistratus (Foureye butterflyfish)
  - Chaetodon ocellatus (Spotfin butterflyfish)
  - Chaetodon sedentarius (Reef butterflyfish)
  - Chaetodon striatus (Banded butterflyfish)
- Genus Prognathodes
  - Prognathodes aya (Bank butterflyfish)

==== Pomacanthidae ====
- Genus Centropyge
  - Centropyge argi (Cherubfish)
- Genus Holacanthus
  - Holacanthus bermudensis (Bermuda blue angelfish)
  - Holacanthus ciliaris (Queen angelfish)
  - Holacanthus tricolor (Rock beauty)
- Genus Pomacanthus
  - Pomacanthus arcuatus (Gray angelfish)
  - Pomacanthus paru (French angelfish)

=== Beloniformes ===
==== Belonidae ====
- Genus Strongylura
  - Strongylura marina (Atlantic needlefish)

==== Hemiramphidae ====
- Genus Hemiramphus
  - Hemiramphus balao (Balao halfbeak)

==== Exocoetidae ====
- Genus Cheilopogon
  - Cheilopogon melanurus (Atlantic flyingfish)

=== Cyprinodontiformes ===
==== Fundulidae ====
- Genus Fundulus
  - Fundulus grandis (Gulf killifish)

=== Stephanoberyciformes ===
==== Melamphaidae ====
- Genus Poromitra
  - Poromitra crassiceps (Crested bigscale)

=== Beryciformes ===
==== Holocentridae ====
- Genus Holocentrus
  - Holocentrus adscensionis (Squirrelfish)

=== Syngnathiformes ===
==== Syngnathidae ====
- Genus Hippocampus
  - Hippocampus erectus (Lined seahorse)
- Genus Syngnath
  - Syngnathus scovelli (Gulf pipefish)

=== Scorpaeniformes ===
==== Scorpaenidae ====
- Genus Scorpaena
  - Scorpaena plumieri (Spotted scorpionfish)

==== Triglidae ====
- Genus Prionotus
  - Prionotus carolinus (Northern searobin)

==== Dactylopteridae ====
- Genus Dactylopterus
  - Dactylopterus volitans (Flying gurnard)

=== Perciformes ===
==== Serranidae ====
- Genus Epinephelus
  - Epinephelus adscensionis (Rock hind)
  - Epinephelus guttatus (Red hind)
  - Epinephelus morio (Red grouper)
- Genus Mycteroperca
  - Mycteroperca bonaci (Black grouper)
  - Mycteroperca microlepis (Gag grouper)
  - Mycteroperca phenax (Scamp)

==== Centrarchidae ====
- Genus Mola
  - Mola mola (Ocean sunfish)

==== Priacanthidae ====
- Genus Heteropriacanthus
  - Heteropriacanthus cruentatus (Glasseye snapper)

==== Apogonidae ====
- Genus Apogon
  - Apogon maculatus (Flamefish)

==== Malacanthidae ====
- Genus Malacanthus
  - Malacanthus plumieri (Sand tilefish)

==== Echeneidae ====
- Genus Echeneis
  - Echeneis naucrates (Sharksucker)

==== Carangidae ====
- Genus Caranx
  - Caranx hippos (Crevalle jack)
- Genus Chloroscombrus
  - Chloroscombrus chrysurus (Atlantic bumper)
- Genus Oligoplites
  - Oligoplites saurus (Leatherjack)
- Genus Selene
  - Selene setapinnis (Atlantic moonfish)
- Genus Seriola
  - Seriola rivoliana (Almaco jack)
- Genus Trachinotus
  - Trachinotus carolinus (Florida pompano)

==== Lutjanidae ====
- Genus Lutjanus
  - Lutjanus campechanus (Red snapper)
  - Lutjanus griseus (Gray snapper)
  - Lutjanus synagris (Lane snapper)
- Genus Rhomboplites
  - Rhomboplites aurorubens (Vermilion snapper)

==== Gerreidae ====
- Genus Eucinostomus
  - Eucinostomus argenteus (Spotfin mojarra)

==== Haemulidae ====
- Genus Haemulon
  - Haemulon plumierii (White grunt)
- Genus Orthopristis
  - Orthopristis chrysoptera (Pigfish)

==== Sparidae ====
- Genus Archosargus
  - Archosargus probatocephalus (Sheepshead)
- Genus Lagodon
  - Lagodon rhomboides (Pinfish)

==== Sciaenidae ====
- Genus Cynoscion
  - Cynoscion arenarius (Sand seatrout)
  - Cynoscion nebulosus (Spotted seatrout)
  - Cynoscion nothus (Silver seatrout)
- Genus Eques
  - Eques lanceolatus (Jack-knifefish)
- Genus Menticirrhus
  - Menticirrhus americanus (Southern kingfish)
- Genus Micropogonias
  - Micropogonias undulatus (Atlantic croaker)
- Genus Pogonias
  - Pogonias cromis (Black drum)
- Genus Sciaenops
  - Sciaenops ocellatus (Red drum)

==== Polynemidae ====
- Genus Polydactylus
  - Polydactylus octonemus (Atlantic threadfin)

==== Sphyraenidae ====
- Genus Sphyraena
  - Sphyraena barracuda (Great barracuda)

==== Labridae ====
- Genus Lachnolaimus
  - Lachnolaimus maximus (Hogfish)

==== Scaridae ====
- Genus Sparisoma
  - Sparisoma atomarium (Greenblotch parrotfish)

==== Uranoscopidae ====
- Genus Astroscopus
  - Astroscopus y-graecum (Southern stargazer)

==== Pomatomidae ====
- Genus Pomatomus
  - Pomatomus saltatrix (Bluefish)

==== Rachycentridae ====
- Genus Rachycentron
  - Rachycentron canadum (Cobia)

==== Ephyppidae ====
- Genus Chaetodipterus
  - Chaetodipterus faber (Atlantic spadefish)

==== Trichiuridae ====
- Genus Trichiurus
  - Trichiurus lepturus (Atlantic cutlassfish)

==== Scombridae ====
- Genus Acanthocybium
  - Acanthocybium solandri (Wahoo)
- Genus Euthynnus
  - Euthynnus alletteratus (Little tunny)
- Genus Katsuwonus
  - Katsuwonus pelamis (Skipjack tuna)
- Genus Scomberomorus
  - Scomberomorus cavalla (King mackerel)
  - Scomberomorus maculatus (Spanish mackerel)
  - Scomberomorus regalis (Cero mackerel)
- Genus Thunnus
  - Thunnus albacares (Yellowfin tuna)
  - Thunnus atlanticus (Blackfin tuna)
  - Thunnus thynnus (Bluefin tuna)

==== Istiophoridae ====
- Genus Istiophorus
  - Istiophorus platypterus (Sailfish)
- Genus Kajikia
  - Kajikia albida (White marlin)
- Genus Makaira
  - Makaira nigricans (Blue marlin)

==== Bothidae ====
- Genus Paralichthys
  - Paralichthys albigutta (Gulf flounder)
  - Paralichthys lethostigma (Southern flounder)

==== Balistidae ====
- Genus Balistes
  - Balistes capriscus (Gray triggerfish)

==== Monacanthidae ====
- Genus Aluterus
  - Aluterus scriptus (Scrawled filefish)

==== Diodontidae ====
- Genus Chilomycterus
  - Chilomycterus antennatus (Bridled burrfish)
  - Chilomycterus reticulatus (Spotfin burrfish)

==== Tetraodontidae ====
- Genus Sphoeroides
  - Sphoeroides spengleri (Bandtail puffer)
