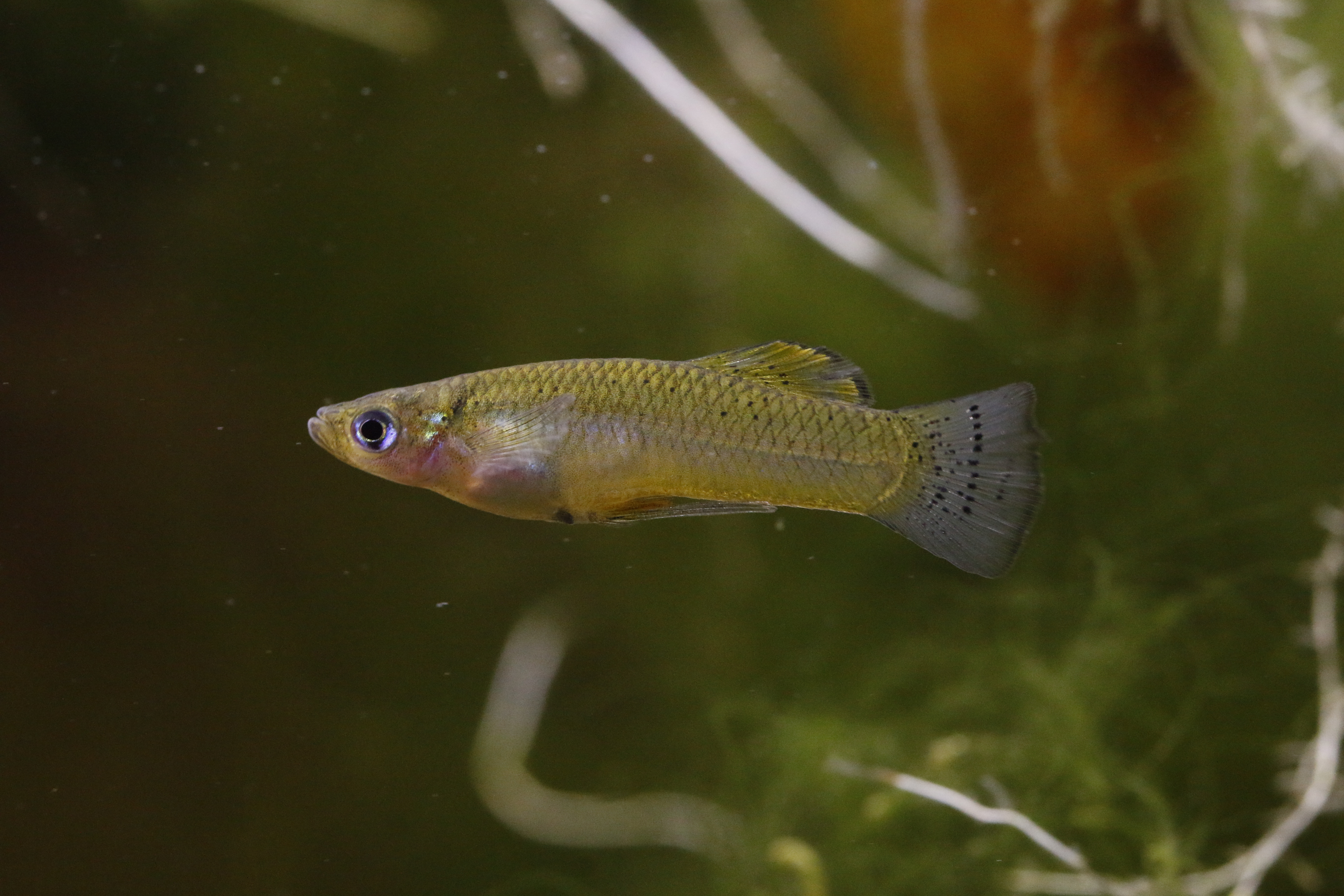

Conservation status
- Least Concern (IUCN 3.1)

Scientific classification
- Kingdom: Animalia
- Phylum: Chordata
- Class: Actinopterygii
- Order: Cyprinodontiformes
- Family: Poeciliidae
- Genus: Gambusia
- Species: G. hispaniolae

Binomial name
- Gambusia hispaniolae Fink, 1971

= Hispaniolan gambusia =

Species of fish

The Hispaniolan gambusia (Gambusia hispaniolae) is a fish endemic to the island of Hispaniola.

== Taxonomy ==
William L. Fink wrote its species description in a 1971 revision of the Gambusia nicaraguensis species group. Some specimens of this species had previously been misidentified as Gambusia dominicensis. Fink named this species after the island of Hispaniola, where this fish is found. The holotype is in the Smithsonian and the type locality is Trou Caïman, Plaine du Cul-de-Sac in Ouest, Haiti.

=== Phylogeny ===
One phylogenetic analysis showed that G. hispaniolae is a sister species to G. punctata and G. rhizophorae.

== Distribution and habitat ==
It is found in Haiti and the western Dominican Republic. It is normally found in springs which flow into brackish and saline lagoons.

== Description ==
The standard length of the males is 18.1–29.8 mm (0.71–1.17 in) and the standard length of the females is 19.1–51.8 mm (0.75–2.04 in).
