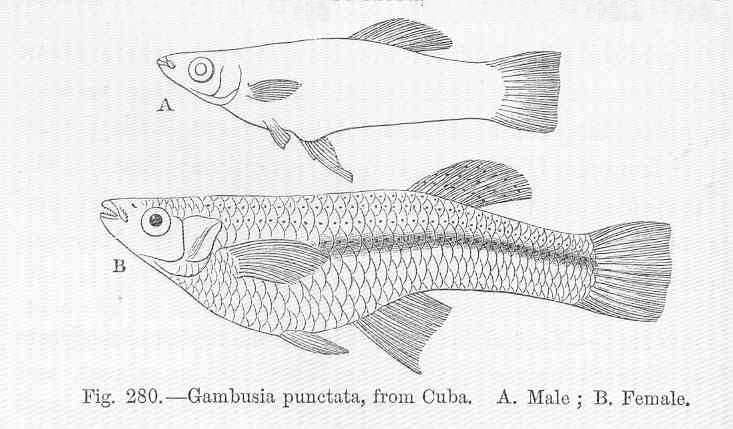
- Male at top, female below

Conservation status
- Least Concern (IUCN 3.1)

Scientific classification
- Kingdom: Animalia
- Phylum: Chordata
- Class: Actinopterygii
- Division: Teleostei
- Order: Cyprinodontiformes
- Family: Poeciliidae
- Genus: Gambusia
- Species: G. punctata

Binomial name
- Gambusia punctata Poey, 1854

= Cuban gambusia =

Species of fish

The Cuban gambusia, spotted gambusia or blue gambusia (Gambusia punctata) is a species of freshwater fish. It is a member of the family Poeciliidae of order Cyprinodontiformes, and is the type species of its genus. It is native to Cuba, inhabiting lakes, ponds and streams, including mountain streams. A carnivorous surface feeder, it occurs in shoals near the shoreline. It be found in estuarine habitat.

This species has the terminal, upward-facing mouth typical of surface feeders, and a protruding belly. It has four or five rows of darkly spotted scales, possibly forming a dark lateral stripe in the case of the midline row. The dorsal and caudal fins are typically partially spotted. Males reach a maximum standard length (SL) of around 4.8 cm, with females reaching about 7.0 cm. The recorded SL for this species is 10 cm.

Gambusia punctata is part of a species complex including G. rhizophorae, G. xanthosoma, G. beebei and G. pseudopunctata. Additional cryptic species have been proposed to exist within the range of G. punctata on the basis of mitochondrial haplogroup data.
