= Yellowfin gambusia =

Conservation status
- Data Deficient (IUCN 3.1)

Scientific classification
- Kingdom: Animalia
- Phylum: Chordata
- Class: Actinopterygii
- Order: Cyprinodontiformes
- Family: Poeciliidae
- Genus: Gambusia
- Species: G. alvarezi

Binomial name
- Gambusia alvarezi C. Hubbs & V. G. Springer, 1957

Species of fish

The yellowfin gambusia (Gambusia alvarezi) is a species of fish in the family Poeciliidae. It is endemic to the Rio Conchos of Chihuahua, Mexico, where it is known as guayacon de san gregorio. This species was described in 1957 by Clark Hubbs and Victor G. Springer with the type locality given as El Ojo de San Gregorio in Chihuahua. The specific name of this fish honours the Mexican ichthyologist José Alvarez del Villar (1903-1986) for his work on the fishes of Mexico and for his assistance to Clark and Springer.
