= Gambusia luma =

Scientific classification
- Kingdom: Animalia
- Phylum: Chordata
- Class: Actinopterygii
- Division: Teleostei
- Order: Cyprinodontiformes
- Family: Poeciliidae
- Genus: Gambusia
- Species: G. luma

Binomial name
- Gambusia luma D. E. Rosen & R. M. Bailey, 1963

Species of fish

Gambusia luma, commonly known as the sleek mosquitofish, is a species of fish in the family Poeciliidae. It can grow up to 5.5 cm in length.

== Description ==
G. luma has a small, robust body; light olive in colour. A dark, oblique bar is present under the eye, and the upper rear margin of the tail fin is yellow-orange. Dorsal and tail fins have dark spots present.

== Distribution ==
G. luma is a freshwater fish found in Central America -- notably Belize, Guatemala, and Honduras -- at a depth of less than 1 m.
