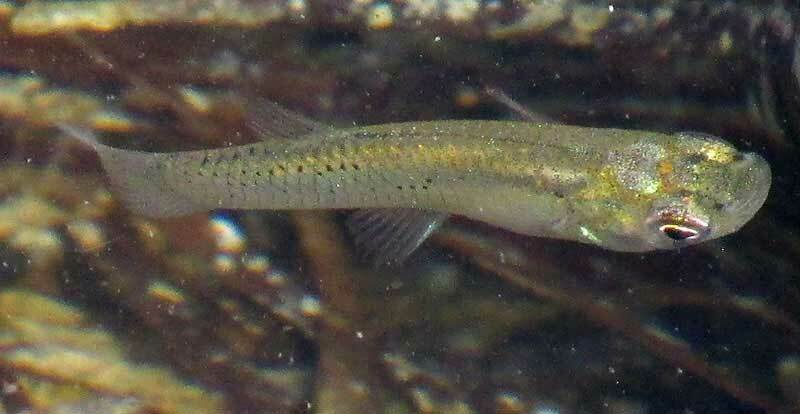

Conservation status
- Least Concern (IUCN 3.1)

Scientific classification
- Kingdom: Animalia
- Phylum: Chordata
- Class: Actinopterygii
- Order: Cyprinodontiformes
- Family: Poeciliidae
- Genus: Gambusia
- Species: G. yucatana

Binomial name
- Gambusia yucatana Regan, 1914

Synonyms
- Gambusia puncticulata yucatana Regan, 1914; Gambusia yucatana australis Greenfield, 1985

= Gambusia yucatana =

Yucatan Gambusia

Species of fish

Gambusia yucatana is a species of fish of the ray-finned fish family, the Actinopterygii, and the order of the Cyprinodontiformes, which are mostly small, freshwater fish.

== Description ==
Males can reach 5.5 cm (2.17 in) in total length and females are reported reaching 8 cm (3.15 in). The species are internal livebearers -- their eggs hatch inside the females, and the young are born directly into the water.

== Distribution ==
Yucatán Gambusia occurs in Mexico's Yucatan Peninsula as well as Belize and northern Guatemala.

== Habitat ==
Gambusia yucatana is described as living in fresh water, and as benthopelagic, the latter term referring to fish inhabiting water just above the water's bottom, feeding on benthic zone organisms and zooplankton. However, the fish illustrated in the taxonomy bar was observed where brackish water of an estuary flowed into the somewhat less brackish water of a mangrove swamp, so the species appears to tolerate a little salt.

== Taxonomy ==
In 1914, Gambusia yucatana was introduced to science by Charles Tate Regan, in a work entitled "Descriptions of two new cyprinodont fishes from Mexico, presented to the British Museum by Herr A. Rachow." That original description can be viewed online, on page 67, at the Biodiversity Heritage Library There it's seen that four type specimens were taken at Progreso, Yucatán.

=== Etymology ===
The genus name Gambusia derives from the Cuban term, Gambusino, which means "nothing", usually in the context of a joke or a farce -- as when one catches gambusinos, not really catching much of anything.

The species name yucatana honors the Yucatán Peninsula where it mainly occurs.

== Similar species ==
Gambusia yucatana can be confused with the Caribbean Gambusia, Gambusia puncticulata (dark stripe under eyes) and the Pike Topminnow, Belonesox belizanus (extended pointed snout; prominent spot at base of caudal fin).

== Conservation status ==
The IUCN Red List of Threatened Species in 2019 considers Yucatán Gambusias as species of least concern.

However, considering the Yucatán's large population centers, as in Mérida and Cancún, and the peninsula's karst topography in which groundwater flows through numerous interconnected channels in the limestone rock relatively quickly, the species may be negatively affected by contaminated groundwater. A study of the effects of organochlorine pesticide concentrations in a canal draining through the city of Campeche, Mexico found that the compounds may have estrogenic effects on Yucatán Gambusia. Up to 16 organochloride compounds from such sources as Aldrin concentrate in the species, and the higher the compound concentrations, the lower the male Yucatán Gambusia's sperm count.

== Gallery ==
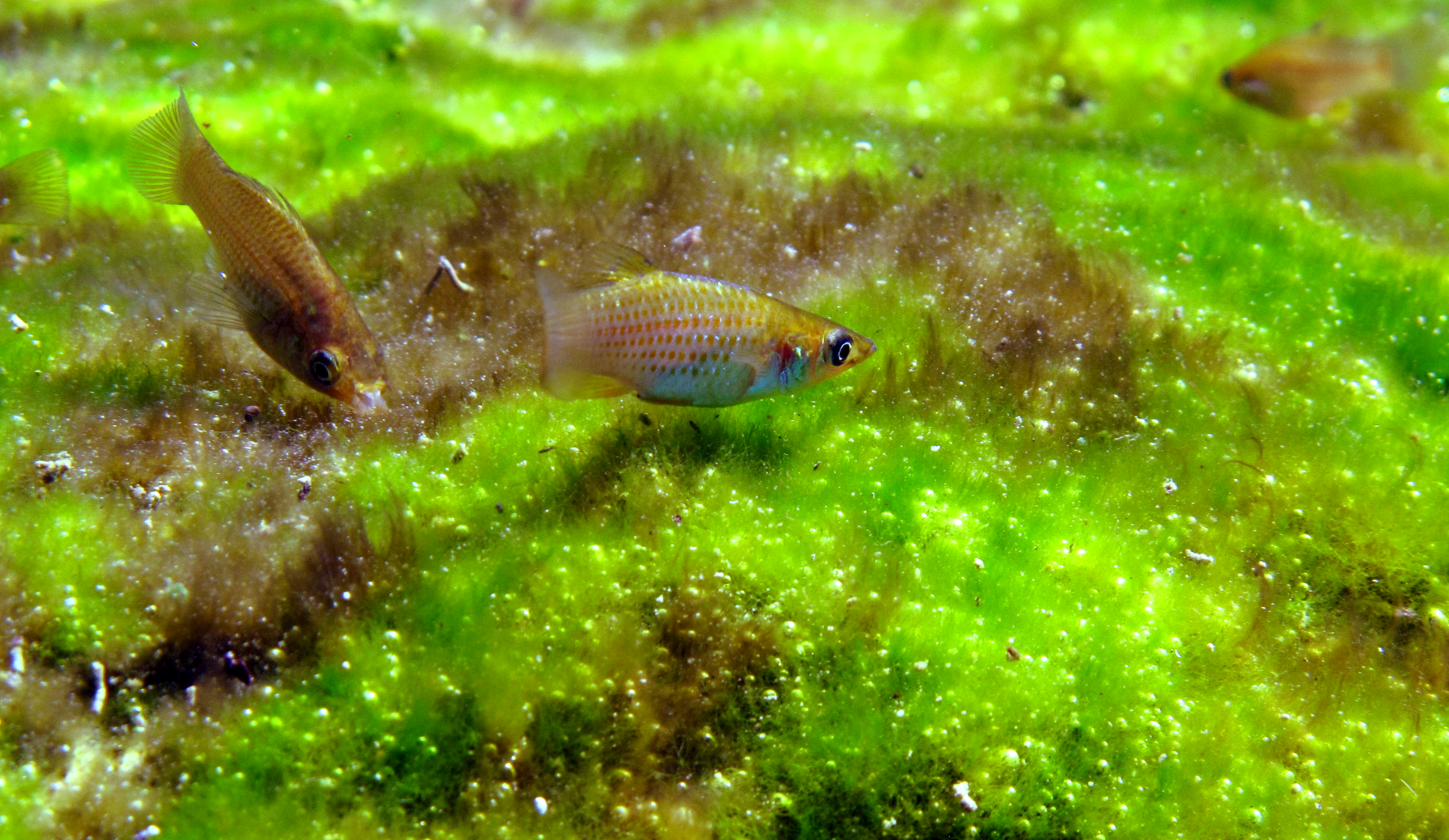
In Tulúm, Quintana Roo

== Bibliography ==
- Lucinda, P.H.F.: Poeciliidae (Livebearers). Páginas 555-581. En: R.E. Reis, S.O. Kullander & C.J. Ferraris, Jr. (eds.): Checklist of the Freshwater Fishes of South and Central America. Ed. EDIPUCRS, Porto Alegre, Brazil. 2003.
- Moyle, P. y J. Cech.: Fishes: An Introduction to Ichthyology, 4ª edición, Upper Saddle River, Nueva Jersey, Estados Unidos: Prentice-Hall. 2000.
- Nelson, Joseph S.; Grande, Terry C.; Wilson, Mark V. H. (2016). Fishes of the World (5th ed.). Hoboken: John Wiley and Sons. doi:10.1002/9781119174844. ISBN 978-1-118-34233-6.
- Wheeler, A.: The World Encyclopedia of Fishes, 2ª edición, London: Macdonald. 1985.
