= Widemouth gambusia =

Conservation status
- Critically Endangered (IUCN 3.1)

Scientific classification
- Kingdom: Animalia
- Phylum: Chordata
- Class: Actinopterygii
- Order: Cyprinodontiformes
- Family: Poeciliidae
- Genus: Gambusia
- Species: G. eurystoma

Binomial name
- Gambusia eurystoma R. R. Miller, 1975

Species of fish

The widemouth gambusia (Gambusia eurystoma) is a species of fish in the family Poeciliidae of the order Cyprinodontiformes. It is endemic to Mexico, specifically to the Baños del Azufre (Grijalva River basin) near Teapa, Tabasco. The Baños del Azufre are sulfidic springs that contain high concentrations of toxic hydrogen sulfide (H_{2}S). This prevents most animals from living in them; the only other fish found in the toxic sections of Baños del Azufre is the sulphur molly (Poecilia sulphuraria).

This species reaches a maximum overall length around 3.5 cm (1.4 in).

Little is known about G. eurystoma, but the IUCN classifies it as Critically Endangered on the basis of a very small (less than 250 individuals) and rapidly falling population and a small, localized, and diminishing geographical distribution.
