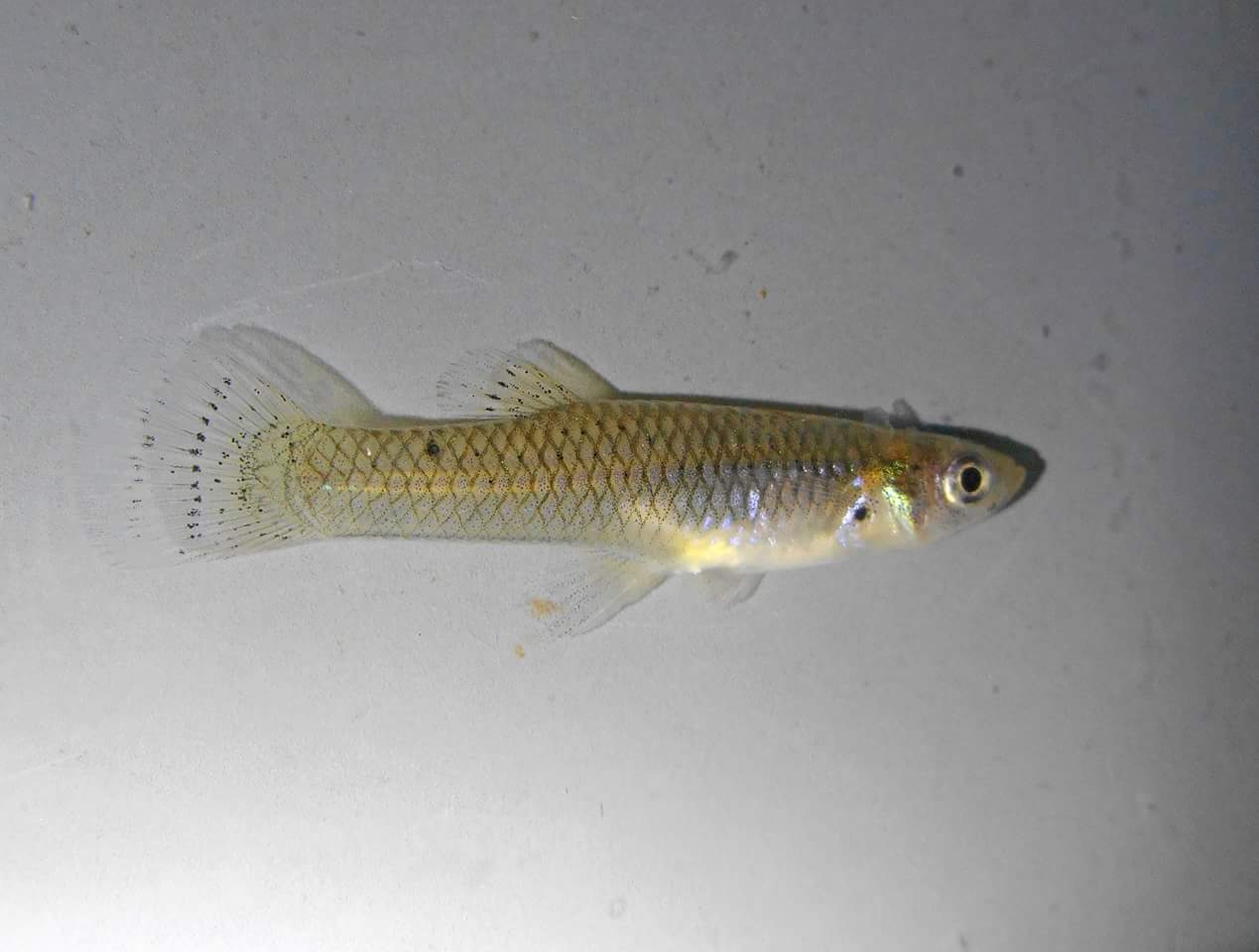

Conservation status
- Least Concern (IUCN 3.1)

- Vulnerable (NatureServe)

Scientific classification
- Kingdom: Animalia
- Phylum: Chordata
- Class: Actinopterygii
- Order: Cyprinodontiformes
- Family: Poeciliidae
- Genus: Gambusia
- Species: G. speciosa

Binomial name
- Gambusia speciosa Girard, 1859

= Gambusia speciosa =

Species of fish

Gambusia speciosa, the Tex-Mex gambusia, is a species of fish in the family Poeciliidae which is found in the United States and Mexico. In Mexico its range covers the states of Chihuahua, Coahuila, Nuevo León and Tamaulipas while in the United States it is found in New Mexico and Texas. In Texas it is restricted to the Devils River and its tributaries in Val Verde County. The habitat of the Tex-Mex gambusia includes springs, outflow channels, marshes and the margins of small to medium-sized streams. This species was described by Charles Frédéric Girard in 1859 with the type locality given as the Río San Diego, near Cadereita in Nuevo León.
