= Gambusia quadruncus =

Scientific classification
- Kingdom: Animalia
- Phylum: Chordata
- Class: Actinopterygii
- Order: Cyprinodontiformes
- Family: Poeciliidae
- Genus: Gambusia
- Species: G. quadruncus

Binomial name
- Gambusia quadruncus Langerhans, Gifford, Domínguez-Domínguez, García-Bedoya & T. J. DeWitt, 2012

Species of fish

Gambusia quadruncus, known as the llanos mosquitofish, is a species of bony fish in the genus Gambusia, part of the family Poeciliidae, that lives in east-central Mexico. Sometimes coexisting with at least three similar species, it differs from its closest relative, Gambusia affinis, in several characteristics with plausible effects on reproductive isolation.

"Combined analysis of mitochondrial and nuclear gene sequence data indicates reciprocal monophyly of the species and its sister species Gambusia affinis, with levels of genetic divergence suggesting the two species diverged from one another over a million years ago. The origin of Gambusia quadruncus may reflect a vicariant event associated with Pliocene orogenesis in the Tamaulipas Arch and a frontal section of the Sierra Madre Oriental (Lleran Mesas)."

Inhabiting a variety of freshwater habitats across regional river drainages, the range of G. quadruncus spans at least 350 km (220 mi) from north to south, covering over 25,000 km^{2} (9,700 sq mi).
