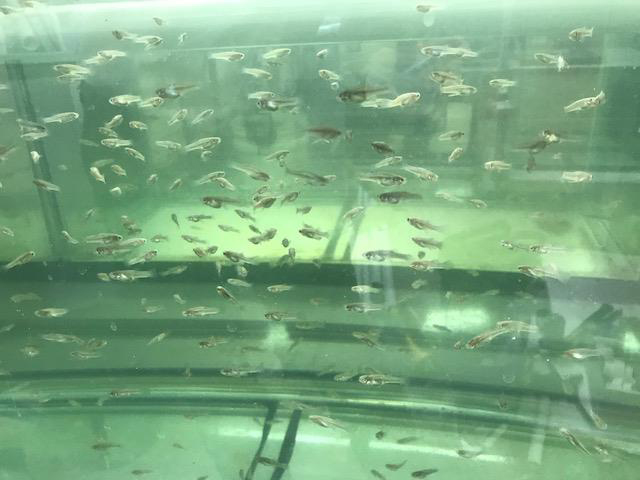

Conservation status
- Vulnerable (IUCN 3.1)

- Critically Imperiled (NatureServe)

Scientific classification
- Kingdom: Animalia
- Phylum: Chordata
- Class: Actinopterygii
- Order: Cyprinodontiformes
- Family: Poeciliidae
- Genus: Gambusia
- Species: G. heterochir

Binomial name
- Gambusia heterochir C. Hubbs, 1957

= Clear Creek gambusia =

Species of fish

The Clear Creek gambusia (Gambusia heterochir) is a species of fish in the family Poeciliidae endemic to the United States, particularly Menard County, Texas.

== Habitat and biology ==
The Clear Creek gambusia inhabits the headwaters of Clear Creek which are derived from springs with clear, acidic water and having a constant temperature. It occurs in area where there is a growth of Ceratophyllum, an aquatic plant, which is also home to this fish's main prey item, the endemic amphipod Hyalella taxana. The submerged vegetation also gives the gambusia cover from its predators. This is an ovoviviparous species and the young are born live. Most births occur between March and September. The fish live their entire lives in the clear spring waters of the Clear Creek tributary of the San Saba River. The fish congregate around submerged aquatic vegetation that provides them with food and shelter.

== Conservation ==
The range of the Clear Creek gambusia was shrunk due to the construction of dams which allowed western mosquitofish (Gambusia affinis) to displace them, as the construction of the dams resulted in a greater variation in water temperatures which the western mosquitofish could tolerate better than the Clear Creek gambusia. By 1979 the last remaining population was protected from competing congeners by being upstream from a dam, below which the waters were populated by mosquito fish. The dam had been damaged by the activities of nutria (Myocastor coypus) and by the growth of tree roots, and hybridization between the Clear Creek gambusia and the western mosquitofish was detected. The dam was repaired, the population increased and in 1985 large numbers of Clear Creek gambusia were detected below the dam. The waters below the dam now had populations of rainwater killifish (Lucania parva), a species not native to the area and thought to be introduced as discarded fishing bait, however, it is thought that the rainwater killifishes outcompeted the western mosquitofish, allowing the Clear Creek gambusia to expand downstream of the dam. The Clear Creek gambusia was put on the United States' list of endangered species in 1967.
