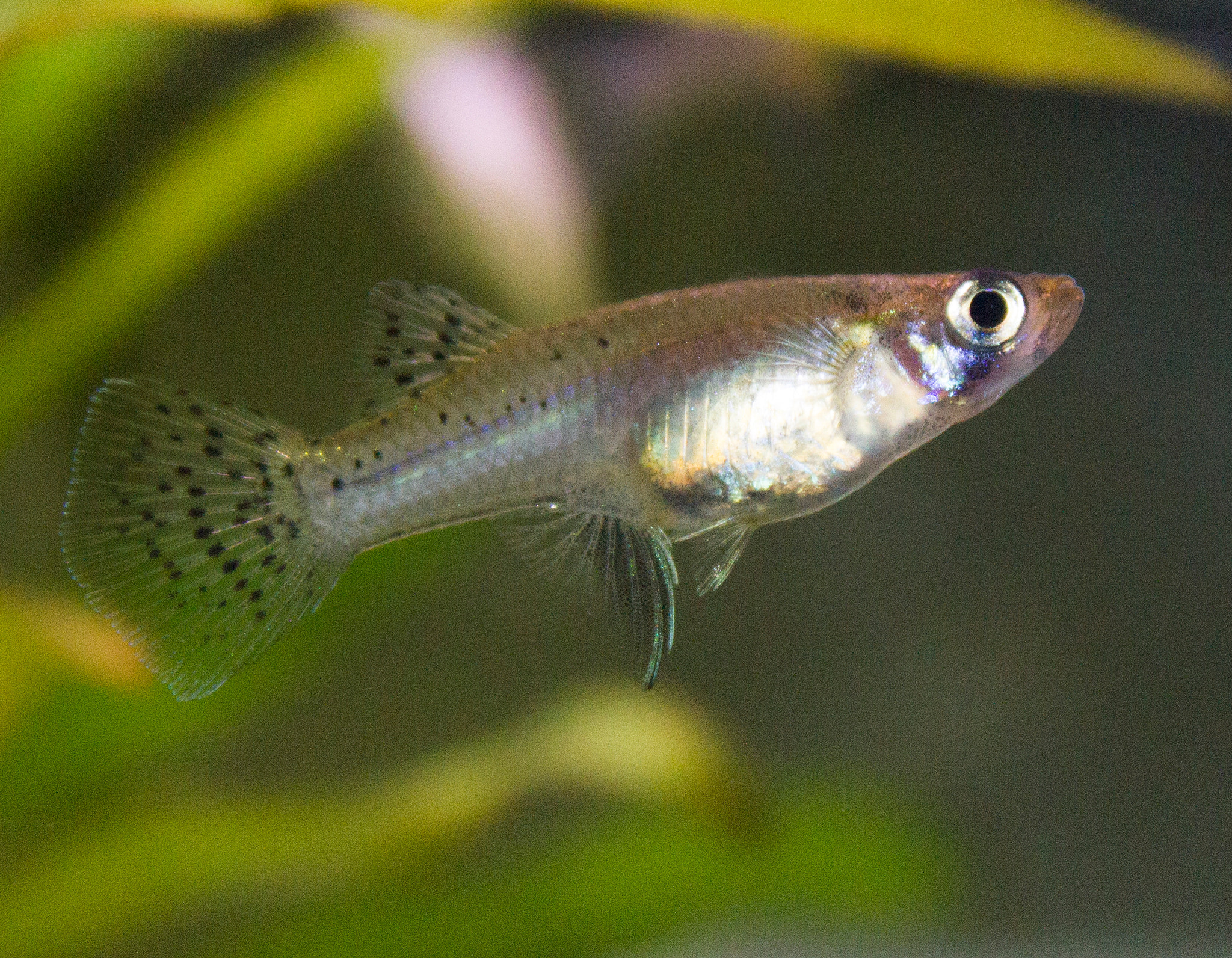
- Gambusia sexradiata

Scientific classification
- Kingdom: Animalia
- Phylum: Chordata
- Class: Actinopterygii
- Division: Teleostei
- Order: Cyprinodontiformes
- Family: Poeciliidae
- Tribe: Gambusiini
- Genus: Gambusia; Poey, 1854

Type species
- Gambusia punctata Poey, 1854

Synonyms
- Arthrophallus C.L. Hubbs, 1926; Dicerophallus J. Álvarez, 1952; Flexipenis C.L. Hubbs, 1963; Heterophallina C.L. Hubbs, 1926; Heterophallus C.T. Regan, 1914 (Note: Heterophallus is a valid genus); Orthophallus L.R. Rivas, 1963; Paragambusia Meek, 1904; Schizophallus C.L. Hubbs, 1926; Toluichthys Dahl, 1964

= Gambusia =

Genus of fishes

Gambusia is a large genus of viviparous fish in the family Poeciliidae (order Cyprinodontiformes). Gambusia contains over 40 species, most of which are principally found in freshwater habitats, though some species may also be found in brackish or saltwater habitats. The genus Gambusia comes from the Cuban term gambusino which means 'free-lance miner' or may be related to Spanish gamusino, an imaginary animal used in a practical joke similar to the snipe hunt. The type species is the Cuban gambusia, G. punctata. The greatest species richness is in Mexico, Texas, and the Greater Antilles, but species are also found elsewhere in the eastern and southern United States, the Bahamas, Central America, and Colombia. Gambusia species are often called topminnows, or simply gambusias; they are also known as mosquitofish, which, however, refers more specifically to two species, G. affinis and G. holbrooki, which are often introduced into ponds to eat mosquito larvae. As a consequence, they have been introduced widely outside their native range, and frequently become invasive, threatening local species. G. affinis and G. holbrooki are now established in many parts of the world and are likely to continue to spread as climatic conditions change. They are only occasionally kept in aquariums, due to their relative lack of color and the highly aggressive nature of the aforementioned mosquitofish species.

Nine species are listed as vulnerable in the IUCN Red List; two, the widemouth gambusia, G. eurystoma, and the crescent gambusia, G. hurtadoi, are critically endangered; and two, the Amistad gambusia, G. amistadensis, and the San Marcos gambusia, G. georgei, are already extinct.

== Species ==
The 45 currently recognized species in this genus are:

- Gambusia affinis (S. F. Baird & Girard, 1853) (mosquitofish, western mosquitofish)
- Gambusia alvarezi C. Hubbs & V. G. Springer, 1957 (yellowfin gambusia)
- †Gambusia amistadensis Peden, 1973 (Amistad gambusia)
- Gambusia atrora D. E. Rosen & R. M. Bailey, 1963 (blackfin gambusia)
- Gambusia aurata R. R. Miller & W. L. Minckley, 1970 (golden gambusia)
- Gambusia baracoana Rivas, 1944
- Gambusia beebei G. S. Myers, 1935 (Miragoane gambusia)
- Gambusia bucheri Rivas, 1944
- Gambusia clarkhubbsi G. P. Garrett & R. J. Edwards, 2003 (San Felipe gambusia)
- Gambusia dominicensis Regan, 1913 (Dominican gambusia)
- Gambusia echeagarayi (Álvarez, 1952) (Maya gambusia)
- Gambusia eurystoma R. R. Miller, 1975 (widemouth gambusia)
- Gambusia gaigei C. L. Hubbs, 1929 (Big Bend gambusia)
- Gambusia geiseri C. Hubbs & C. L. Hubbs, 1957 (largespring gambusia)
- †Gambusia georgei C. Hubbs & Peden, 1969 (San Marcos gambusia)
- Gambusia heterochir C. Hubbs, 1957 (Clear Creek gambusia)
- Gambusia hispaniolae W. L. Fink, 1971 (Hispaniolan gambusia)
- Gambusia holbrooki Girard, 1859 (eastern mosquitofish)
- Gambusia hurtadoi C. Hubbs & V. G. Springer, 1957 (crescent gambusia)
- Gambusia krumholzi W. L. Minckley, 1963 (spotfin gambusia)
- Gambusia lemaitrei Fowler, 1950
- Gambusia longispinis W. L. Minckley, 1962 (Cuatrocienegas gambusia)
- Gambusia luma D. E. Rosen & R. M. Bailey, 1963 (sleek mosquitofish)
- Gambusia manni C. L. Hubbs, 1927
- Gambusia marshi W. L. Minckley & Craddock, 1962 (robust gambusia)
- Gambusia melapleura (P. H. Gosse, 1851) (striped gambusia)
- Gambusia monticola Rivas, 1971
- Gambusia myersi C. G. E. Ah, 1925
- Gambusia nicaraguensis Günther, 1866 (Nicaraguan mosquitofish)
- Gambusia nobilis (S. F. Baird & Girard, 1853) (Pecos gambusia)
- Gambusia panuco C. L. Hubbs, 1926 (Panuco gambusia)
- Gambusia pseudopunctata Rivas, 1969 (Tiburon Peninsula gambusia)
- Gambusia punctata Poey, 1854 (Cuban gambusia)
- Gambusia puncticulata Poey, 1854 (Caribbean gambusia)
- Gambusia quadruncus Langerhans, Gifford, Domínguez-Domínguez, García-Bedoya & T. J. DeWitt, 2012
- Gambusia regani C. L. Hubbs, 1926 (Forlon gambusia)
- Gambusia rhizophorae Rivas, 1969 (mangrove gambusia)
- Gambusia senilis Girard, 1859 (blotched gambusia)
- Gambusia sexradiata C. L. Hubbs, 1936 (teardrop mosquitofish)
- Gambusia speciosa Girard, 1859 (Tex-Mex gambusia)
- Gambusia vittata C. L. Hubbs, 1926 (Gulf gambusia)
- Gambusia wrayi Regan, 1913 (Wray's gambusia)
- Gambusia xanthosoma D. W. Greenfield, 1983 (Cayman gambusia)
- Gambusia yucatana Regan, 1914 (Yucatán gambusia)
- Gambusia zarskei M. K. Meyer, Schories & Schartl, 2010
