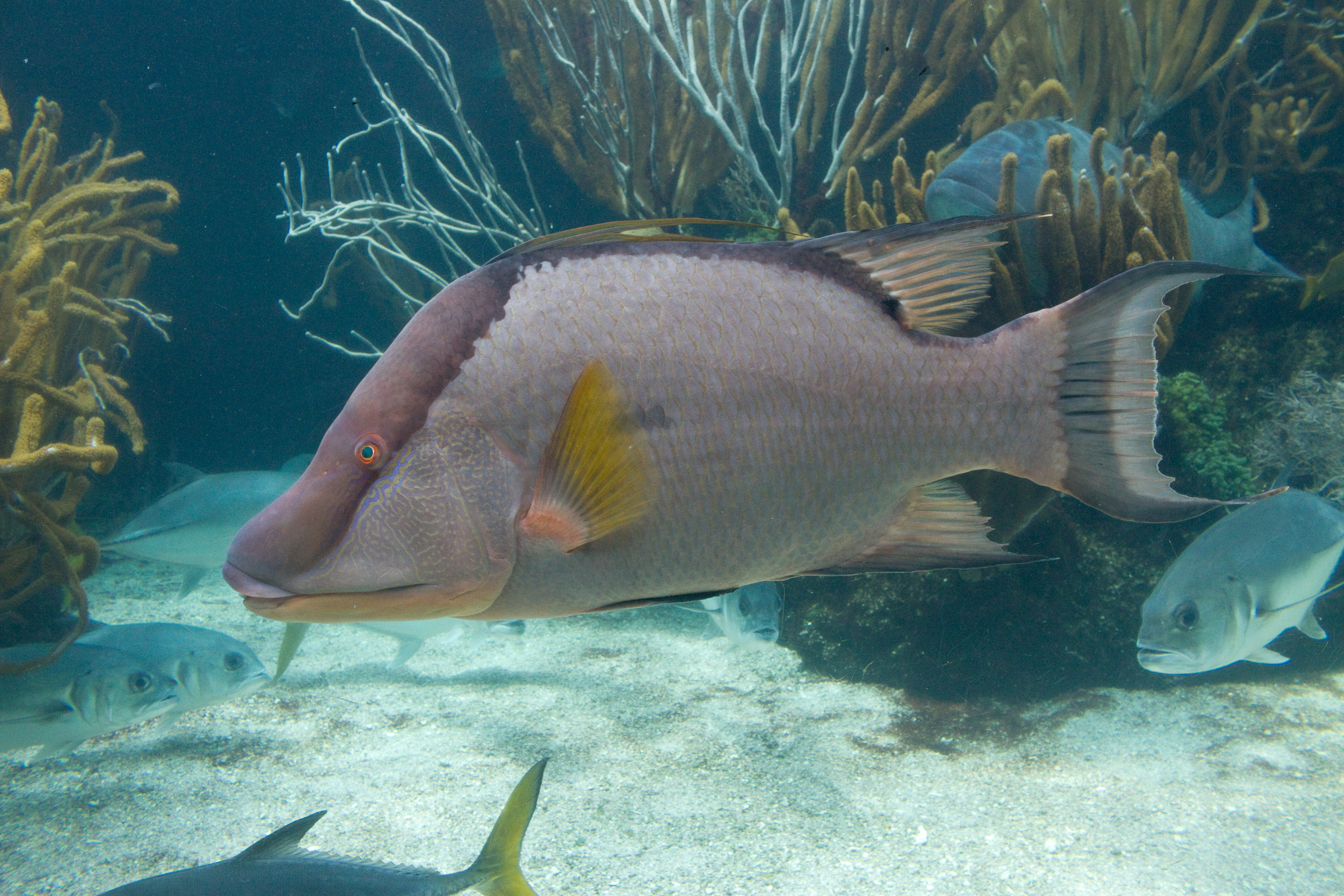
- Male

Conservation status
- Vulnerable (IUCN 3.1)

Scientific classification
- Kingdom: Animalia
- Phylum: Chordata
- Class: Actinopterygii
- Division: Teleostei
- Order: Labriformes
- Family: Labridae
- Subfamily: Hypsigenyinae
- Genus: Lachnolaimus; G. Cuvier, 1829
- Species: L. maximus

Binomial name
- Lachnolaimus maximus (Walbaum, 1792)

Synonyms
- Labrus maximus Walbaum, 1792

= Hogfish =

Species of fish

The hogfish (Lachnolaimus maximus), also known as boquinete, doncella de pluma, or pez perro in Mexico is a species of wrasse native to the western Atlantic Ocean, living in a range from Nova Scotia, Canada, to northern South America, including the Gulf of Mexico. This species occurs around reefs, especially preferring areas with plentiful gorgonians. It is a carnivore that feeds on molluscs, crabs, and sea urchins. This species is currently the only known member of its genus.

== Description ==
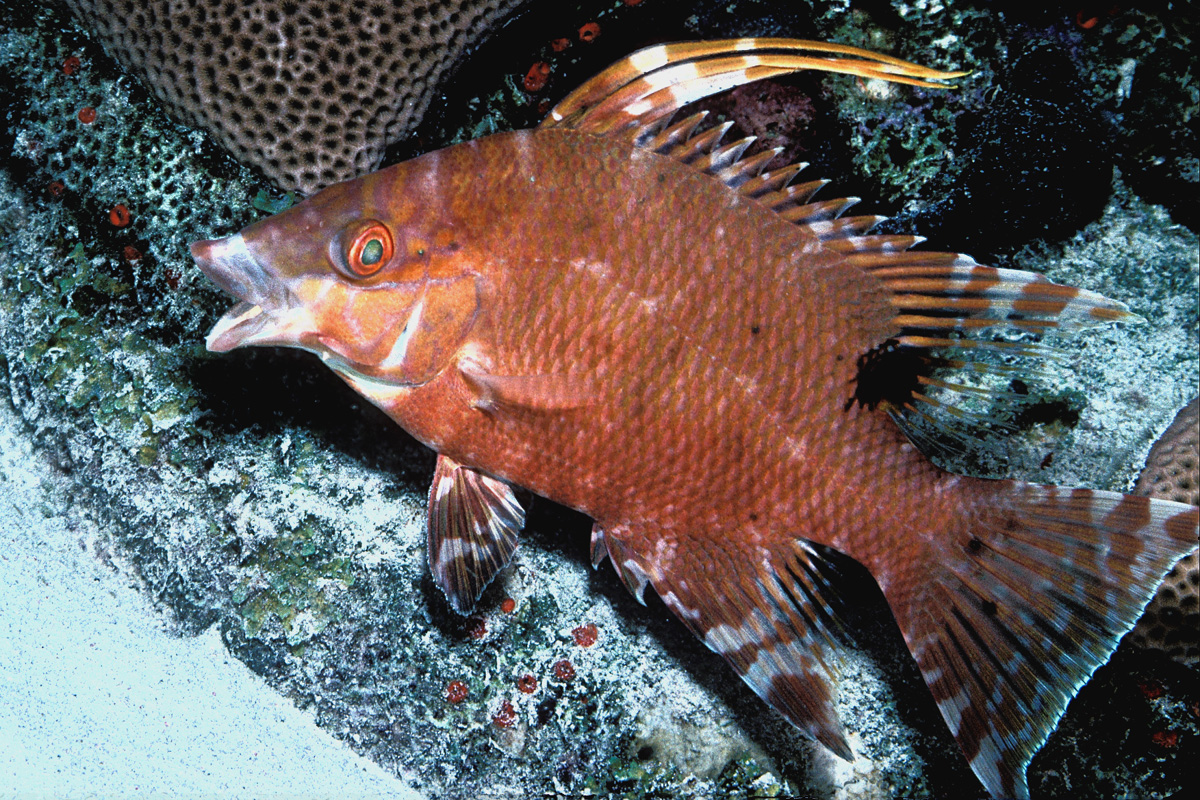
Juvenile

The hogfish possesses a very elongated snout, which it uses to search for crustaceans buried in the sediment. This very long "pig-like" snout and its rooting behavior give the hogfish its name. A prominent black spot behind the pectoral fins differentiates males from females. The dorsal fin usually is composed of three or four long dorsal spines followed by a series of shorter dorsal spines. Hogfish reach a maximum of 90 cm (35 in) in total length and a weight around 11 kg (24 lb). Females and juveniles usually start out as pale gray, brown, or reddish-brown in color, with a paler underside and no distinct patterns. Males are distinguished by a deep, dark band spanning from the snout to the first dorsal spine, and by a lateral black spot behind the pectoral fins. Hogfish also have a form of active camouflage with the assist of dermal photoreception, a sensory capability allowing them to detect light through their skin. Specialized cells containing opsins, located beneath chromatophores, enable hogfish to perceive changes in ambient light.

== Lifecycle ==
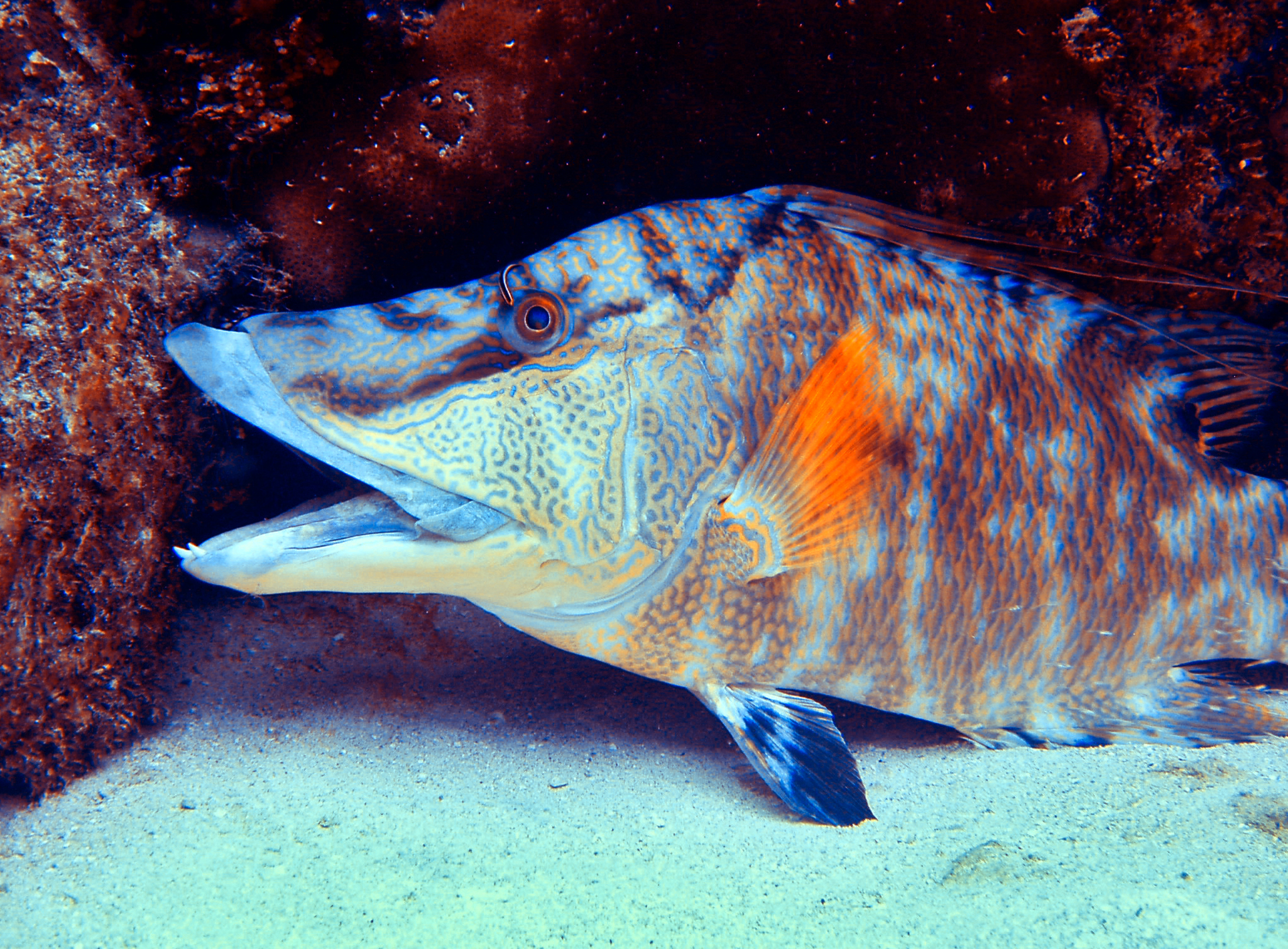
At Grand Cayman Island

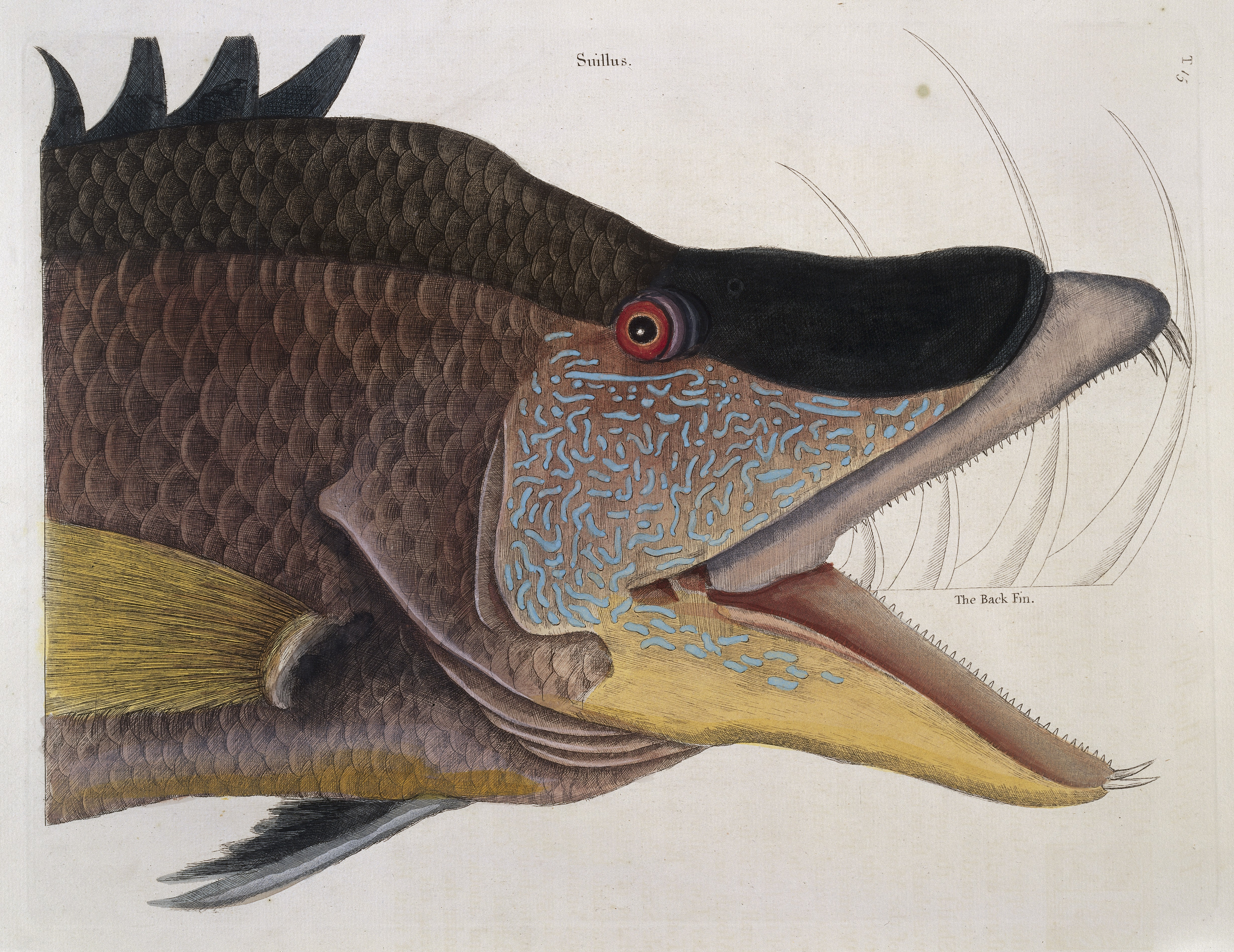
1731 illustration showing jaw protrusion.

Like many wrasses, the hogfish is a sequential hermaphrodite, meaning it changes sex during different life stages; it is a protogynous, "first female" hermaphrodite; juvenile hogfish start out as female and then mature to become male. The change usually occurs around three years of age and about 36 cm (14 in) in length.

Hogfish have been recorded to live up to 11 years. Spawning in South Florida occurs from November through June. Hogfish social groups are organized into harems where one male mates with and protects a group of females in his territory.

== Economic importance ==
Florida landings of hogfish totaled 139,232 kg (306,953 lb) in 2007. The fish stocks are regulated by the South Atlantic Fishery Management Council and Florida Fish and Wildlife Conservation Commission. Bag, size, and gear limits all have been placed on this species to ensure a healthy stock and to protect it from overfishing.

== Gallery ==
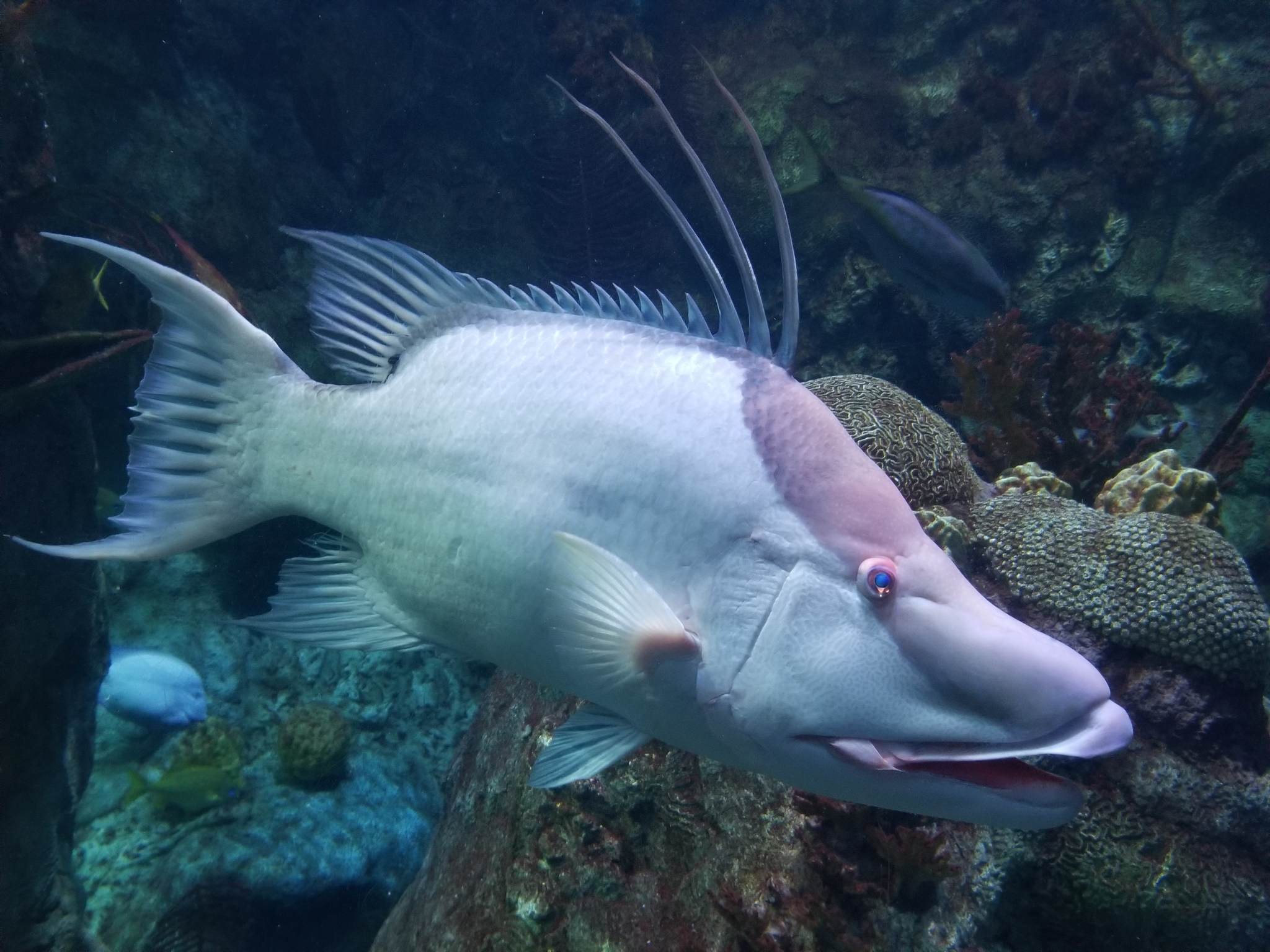
With raised dorsal fin

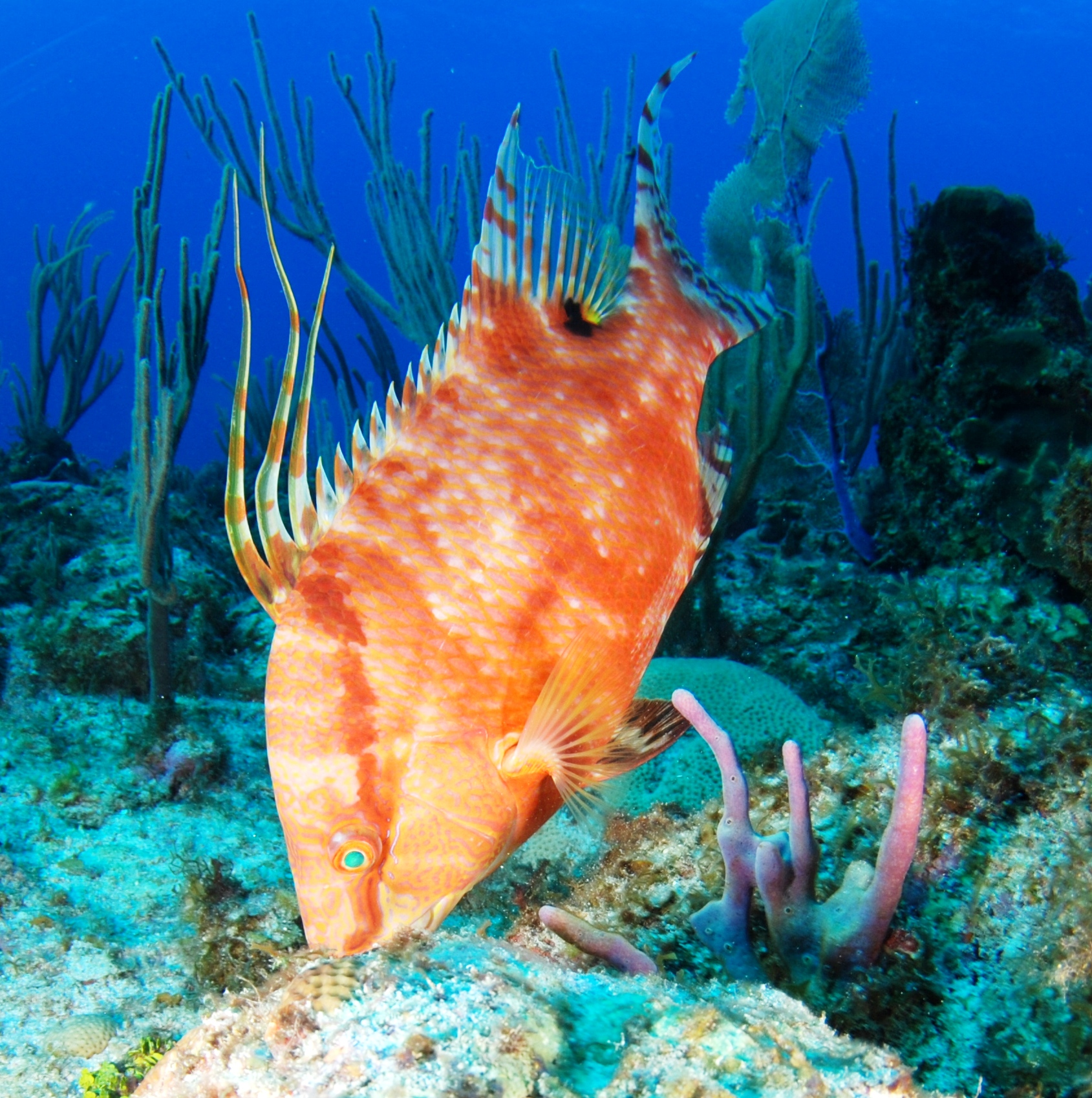

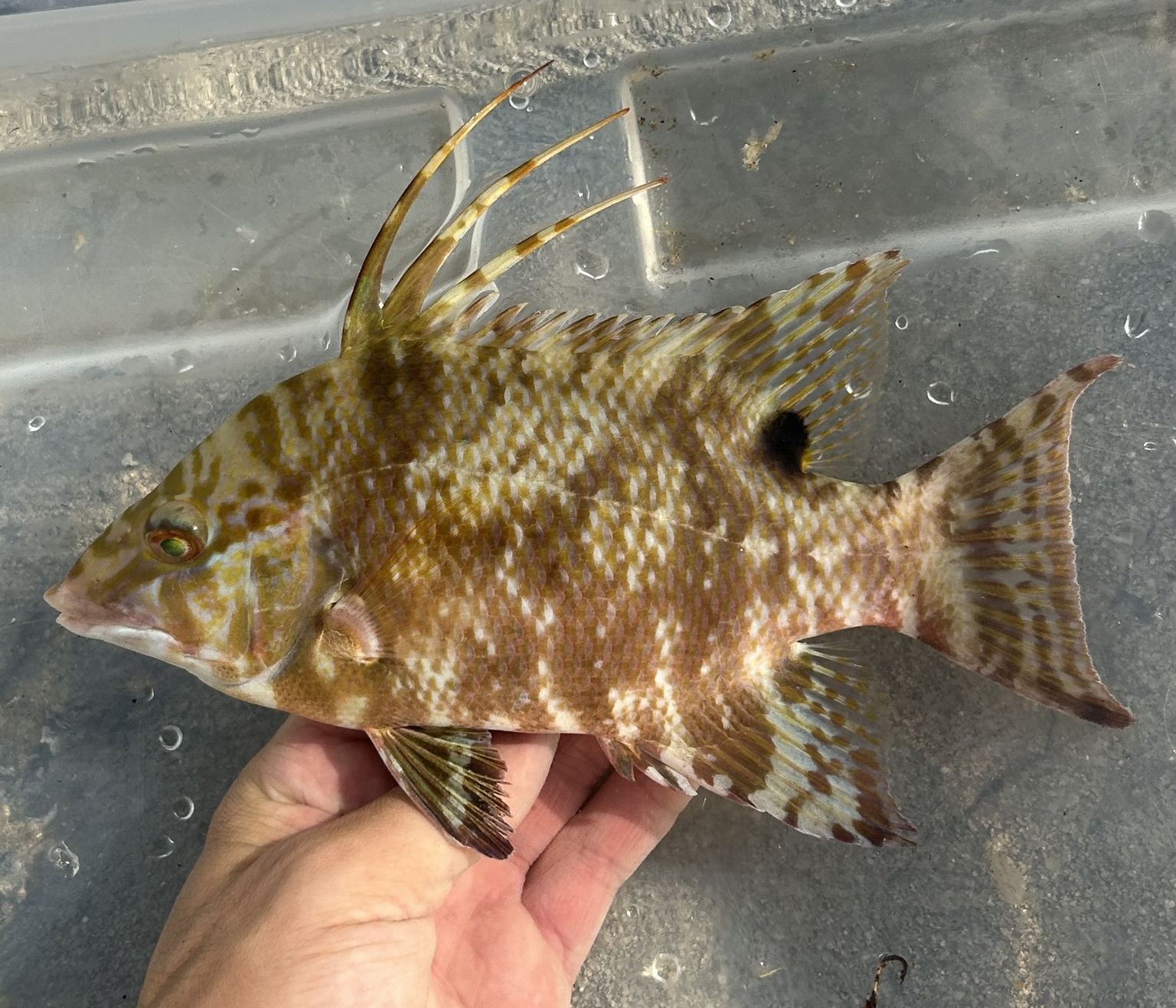

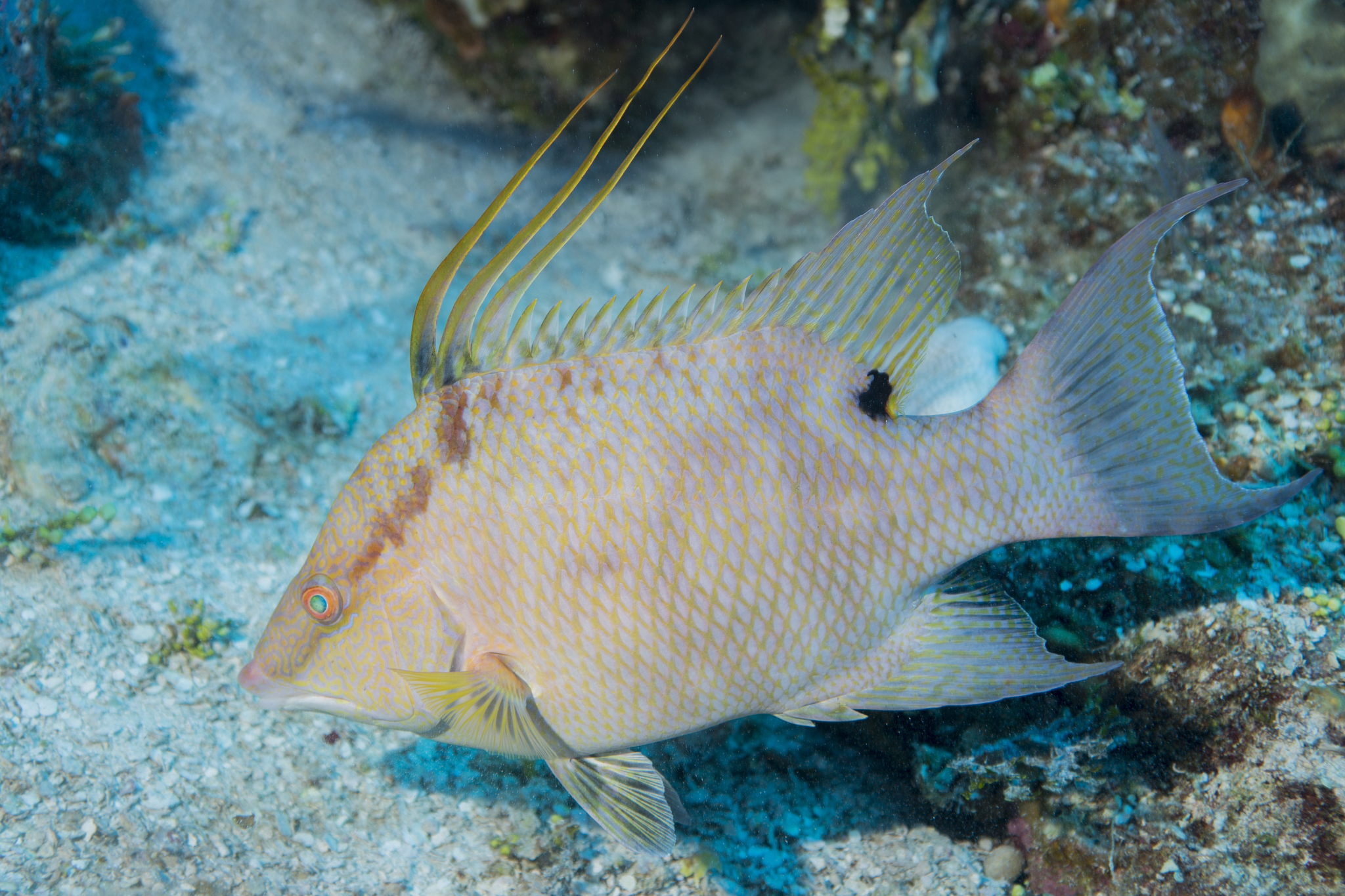

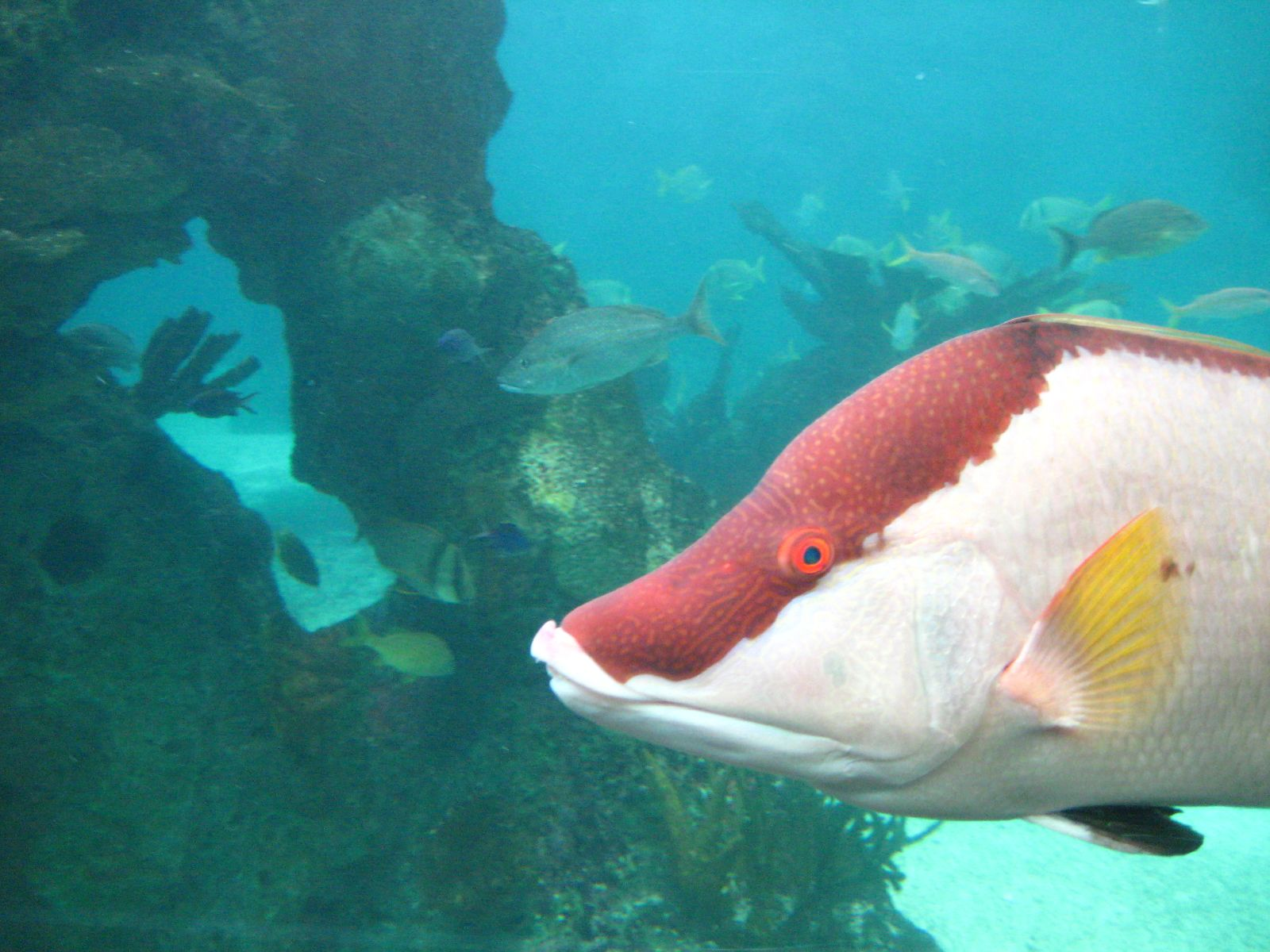
