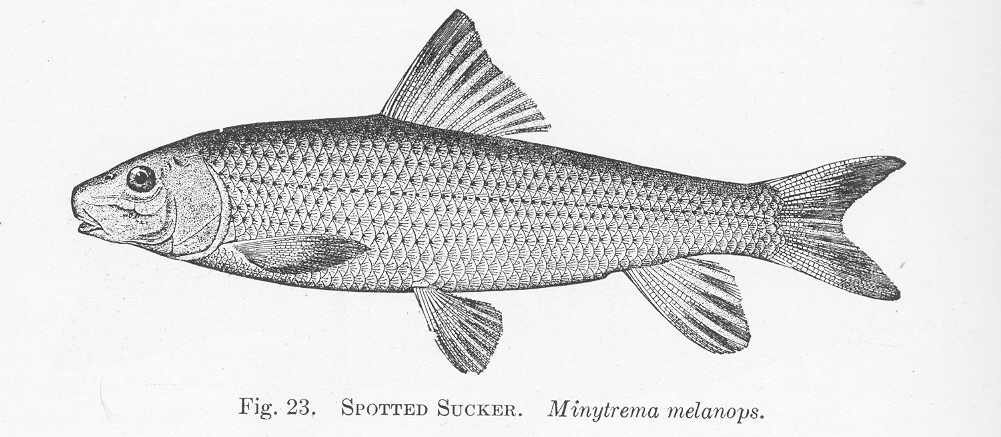
- Minytrema melanops illustration

Conservation status
- Least Concern (IUCN 3.1)

Scientific classification
- Kingdom: Animalia
- Phylum: Chordata
- Class: Actinopterygii
- Order: Cypriniformes
- Family: Catostomidae
- Genus: Minytrema; D. S. Jordan, 1878
- Species: M. melanops

Binomial name
- Minytrema melanops (Rafinesque, 1820)

Synonyms
- Catostomus melanops Rafinesque, 1820

= Spotted sucker =

Species of fish

The spotted sucker (Minytrema melanops) is a species of sucker (fish) that is native to eastern North America. The spotted sucker inhabits deep pools of small to medium rivers over clay, sand or gravel. They are occasionally found in creeks and large rivers. Through its life stages, the spotted sucker goes from a mid-depth predator to a bottom forager. Spotted suckers have a lifespan of approximately six years and spawn in April and May. Limited knowledge of the occurrence, abundance, and natural history of this species has been an impediment to status assessment and the determination of need for conservation measures within this family.

== Description ==
Spotted suckers have a dark spot at the base of each scale giving them the appearance of having many rows of small black spots on their body and can reach about 19 inches.

== Geographic distribution ==
The spotted sucker has a very wide distribution. They are widely found throughout the central and southeastern United States and reach southern Canada. They are distributed within and east of the Great Lakes and Mississippi River basin but these species are at the southeastern limits of their distribution in the Apalachicola River. It is found in the lower Great Lakes and Mississippi River Basins from Pennsylvania to Minnesota and in Atlantic and Gulf Slope drainages in North Carolina to western Texas. Populations in the United States have remained stable and they are still relatively common. The spotted sucker prefers clean, clear bodies water with a firm substrate. It is reported that they are abundant in oxbow lakes and other areas without a strong current. They do not tolerate pollution or siltation very well and because of this they have been lost in some areas of their historic range such as Illinois. Numbers are also declining in areas such as Ohio and Kansas. Farther north in Canada the species is a species of concern due to declining numbers and deteriorating water quality. This represents the northernmost area of their range, so they may have always been rare in Canada.

== Ecology ==
The feeding habits of M. melanops show a distinct change throughout its life cycle. As larvae the fish feed upon individual zooplankton. Larvae up to 25 millimeters in length were observed feeding in shallow back waters during the day. The spotted sucker begins to ingest organic matter once they reach approximately 25 millimeters. It is at this length that they become bottom feeders. At about 50 millimeters Minytrema begins to feed on the substrate and benthos and sand become part of the stomach contents. As larvae and juvenile Minytrema feeds in schools, but as they become adults they separate to feed in deeper waters. There is not much known about the feeding habits of adults. It is believed that suckers feed primarily during dusk and dawn. Spotted suckers primarily feed upon organic fragments, copepods, cladocerans, and chironomids. Other benthic invertebrates have been found in gut contents, but are not a large part of the diet. The stomach content of spotted suckers varies with the time of the year. In the spring, summer, and autumn large numbers of zooplankton are ingested. In the summer and autumn chironomids are also found. This shows the change in abundance with the change in season. Numerically, organic fragments and sand are most abundantly found in the gut. This is followed by diatoms, copepods and cladocerans making up much of the remainder. From the differences in abundance and types of particles in gut contents from different populations, it appears that Minytrema is not selective for any particular group, but harvests those groups that are seasonally or regionally abundant.

Predators of the spotted sucker typically vary depending on the environment. It depends heavily on clean waters with no silt to survive. It prefers sluggish water, but has been found in some turbid environments. Human activities have caused for the streams that Minytrema lives in to become silted, thus making it hard for them to survive. However, dams have also caused impoundments which can cause slower moving waters and boost populations.

== Life history ==
Spawning season for the spotted suckers begin anywhere from early March to early May when the water temperature reaches approximately 12 to 19 °C (54 to 66 °F). The fish migrate upstream to smaller tributaries in January to spawn in riffles containing gravel substrates. There are usually two males for every female. As the female approaches, the males bump and prod her in the abdomen. The males then clasp the posterior half of the female between themselves on either dies. They vibrate their caudal sections and head toward the surface. During this time semibouyant eggs are released downstream. There is no parental care by the adults. The males do not guard the nest and leave after the act of spawning. Both sexes are able to spawn more than once in a season. The eggs will hatch after seven to ten days depending on the water temperature and will reach sexual maturation after three years. The lifespan is generally six years. However, fish in the southeast and to only live for five years. It is unknown why this is.

Early development of M. melanops is quite similar to that of other catostomids. Larvae can be identified by fin ray counts, myomere counts, and pigmentation.

== Conservation and management ==
Spotted suckers are not federally listed as endangered or threatened in the United States. However, in Canada the number of spotted suckers is very low. They are listed as a species of concern and fishermen are asked to report any sightings they have of the fish in order to keep a current count of fish populations. The suckers do not usually hybridize with other species. Overfishing is not a problem for this species. While they generally taste pretty good to eat, the flesh has a lot of bones making it difficult to clean them.
