= Gambusia senilis =

Conservation status
- Near Threatened (IUCN 3.1)

Scientific classification
- Kingdom: Animalia
- Phylum: Chordata
- Class: Actinopterygii
- Order: Cyprinodontiformes
- Family: Poeciliidae
- Genus: Gambusia
- Species: G. senilis

Binomial name
- Gambusia senilis Girard, 1859

Species of fish

Gambusia senilis, the blotched gambusia, is a species of fish in the family Poeciliidae found in Mexico, where it is called guayacon pinto, and formerly in the Devil's River in the Rio Grande basin in Texas. The Texas population was extirpated following the construction of the Amistad Dam.
