= Amistad gambusia =

Conservation status
- Extinct (2013) (IUCN 3.1)

Scientific classification
- Kingdom: Animalia
- Phylum: Chordata
- Class: Actinopterygii
- Division: Teleostei
- Order: Cyprinodontiformes
- Family: Poeciliidae
- Genus: Gambusia
- Species: †G. amistadensis

Binomial name
- †Gambusia amistadensis Peden, 1973

Extinct species of fish

The Amistad gambusia (Gambusia amistadensis) is an extinct species of small fish known only from a single locality, the large vegetated Goodenough Spring in Val Verde County, Texas. It apparently was driven to extinction in the wild when its habitat was submerged to a depth of about 70 feet by the construction of the Amistad Reservoir in 1968. The two captive populations, at the University of Texas System and the Dexter National Fish Hatchery in New Mexico, later failed through hybridization with the related mosquitofish and predation. The species has been classified as extinct by the United States Fish and Wildlife Service since 1987, and by the IUCN since 2013.
