= Ornate shiner =

Conservation status
- Least Concern (IUCN 3.1)

Scientific classification
- Kingdom: Animalia
- Phylum: Chordata
- Class: Actinopterygii
- Order: Cypriniformes
- Family: Leuciscidae
- Subfamily: Pogonichthyinae
- Genus: Codoma; Girard, 1856
- Species: C. ornata

Binomial name
- Codoma ornata Girard, 1856

Synonyms
- Cyprinella ornata (Girard, 1856); Notropis ornatus (Girard, 1856)

Species of fish

The ornate shiner (Codoma ornata) is a species of freshwater ray-finned fish in the family Leuciscidae, the shiners, daces and minnows. This fish endemic to Mexico. It is the only species in the genus Codoma.
