= Gambusia dominicensis =

Conservation status
- Data Deficient (IUCN 3.1)

Scientific classification
- Kingdom: Animalia
- Phylum: Chordata
- Class: Actinopterygii
- Order: Cyprinodontiformes
- Family: Poeciliidae
- Genus: Gambusia
- Species: G. dominicensis

Binomial name
- Gambusia dominicensis Regan, 1913

Species of fish

Gambusia dominicensis, known as the Dominican gambusia, domingo gambusia, or domingo mosquito fish, is a species of freshwater fish native to the lake of Etang Saumatre on Hispaniola, in eastern Haiti and the western Dominican Republic. A 2020 update to the IUCN Red List removed the Dominican Republic from the extent of occurrence description; the range map continues to include both countries. The authors noted, "Extent of Occurrence (EOO) and Area of Occupancy (AOO) cannot be determined with accuracy, as the species has not been collected since 1913 and georeferenced records associated with the type locality are lacking".

The domingo gambusia is a member of the family Poeciliidae of order Cyprinodontiformes. It is in the aquarium trade and has been introduced to other bodies of water for mosquito control.
