= Conchos darter =

Conservation status
- Endangered (IUCN 3.1)

Scientific classification
- Kingdom: Animalia
- Phylum: Chordata
- Class: Actinopterygii
- Order: Perciformes
- Family: Percidae
- Genus: Etheostoma
- Species: E. australe

Binomial name
- Etheostoma australe D. S. Jordan, 1889

Species of fish

The Conchos darter (Etheostoma australe) is a species of freshwater ray-finned fish, a darter from the subfamily Etheostomatinae, part of the family Percidae, which also contains the perches, ruffes and pikeperches. It is endemic to the Conchos River system in northern Mexico, where it is known as dardo de conchos. This species can reach a length of 5.5 cm (2.2 in). It occurs in clear water in areas of shallow, rocky riffles and pools where the bed consists of gravel, sand and silt. It can be found as deep as 1 metre (3.3 ft) where the current may vary from slight to strong. The Conchos darter feeds on the bottom of the streams it occurs in on aquatic insect larvae. It is thought that it spawns from late February until June, and it is able to survive water temperatures as high as 30 °C (86 °F) during the summer. The Conchos darter was first formally described in 1889 by the American ichthyologist David Starr Jordan (1851–1931) with the type locality given as the Río Chihuahua in Mexico.
