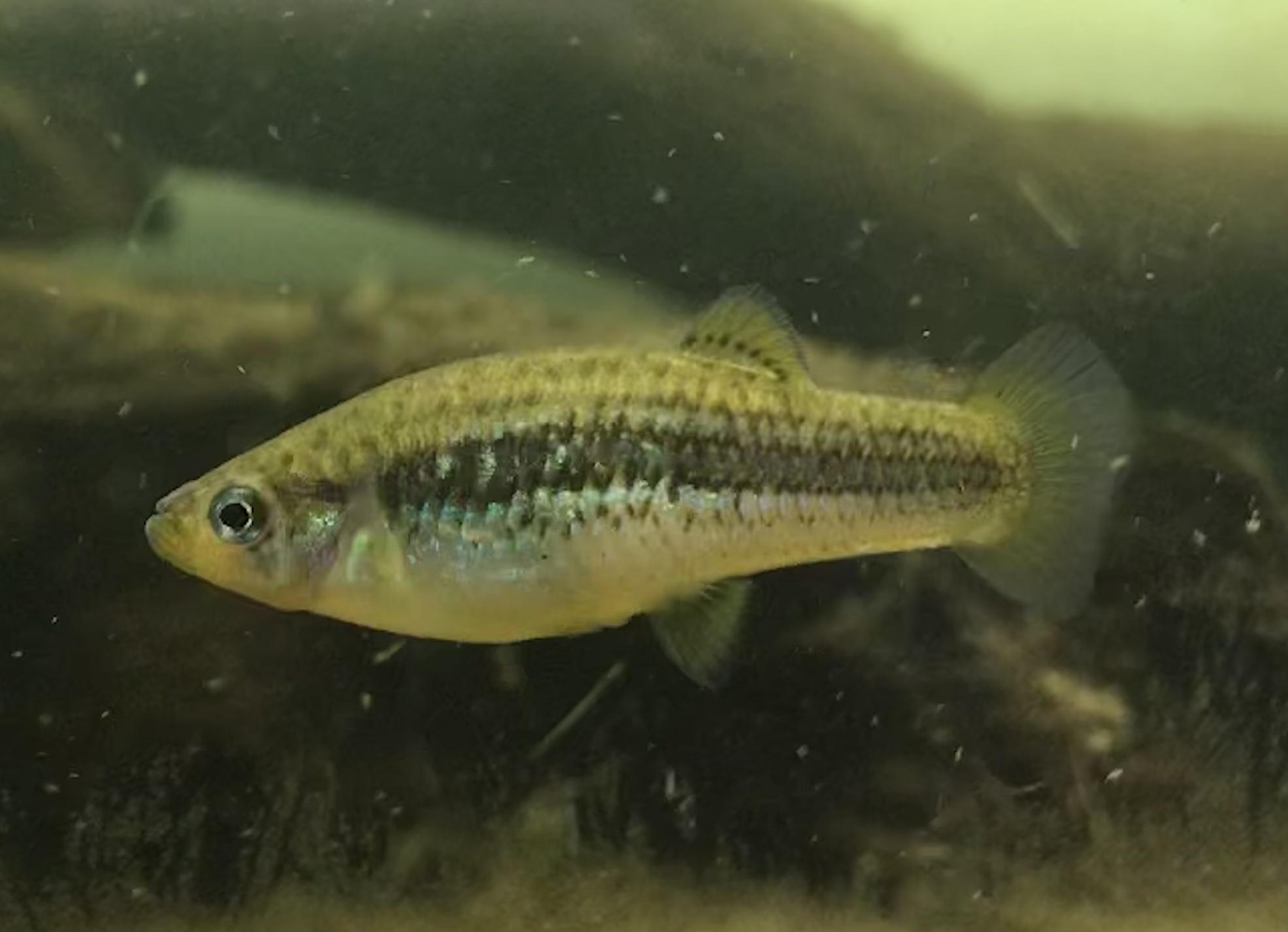
- Female Gambusia hurtadoi in aquarium.

Conservation status
- Critically Endangered (IUCN 3.1)

Scientific classification
- Kingdom: Animalia
- Phylum: Chordata
- Class: Actinopterygii
- Division: Teleostei
- Order: Cyprinodontiformes
- Family: Poeciliidae
- Genus: Gambusia
- Species: G. hurtadoi

Binomial name
- Gambusia hurtadoi C. L. Hubbs & V. G. Springer, 1957

= Gambusia hurtadoi =

Species of fish

Gambusia hurtadoi, also known as crescent gambusia, is a species of fish in the family Poeciliidae. It is endemic to Chihuahua in Mexico, where it is known as guayacon de Hacienda Dolores. It grows to 3.5 cm (1.4 in) total length. The species was described in 1957 by Carl Leavitt Hubbs and Victor G. Springer with the type locality given as El Ojo de la Hacienda Dolores, 7 miles south of Jiminez, Chihuahua, the spring to which this species is endemic. Hubbs and Springer honoured the Mexican Leopoldo Hurtado Olin of the Departamento de Economía in Chihuahua for his assistance during their collecting expedition to Chihuahua in June 1951. Hurtado Olin also informed Hubbs and Springer of the location of El Ojo de la Hacienda Dolores. He was the son of Leopoldo Hurtado Espinosa.
