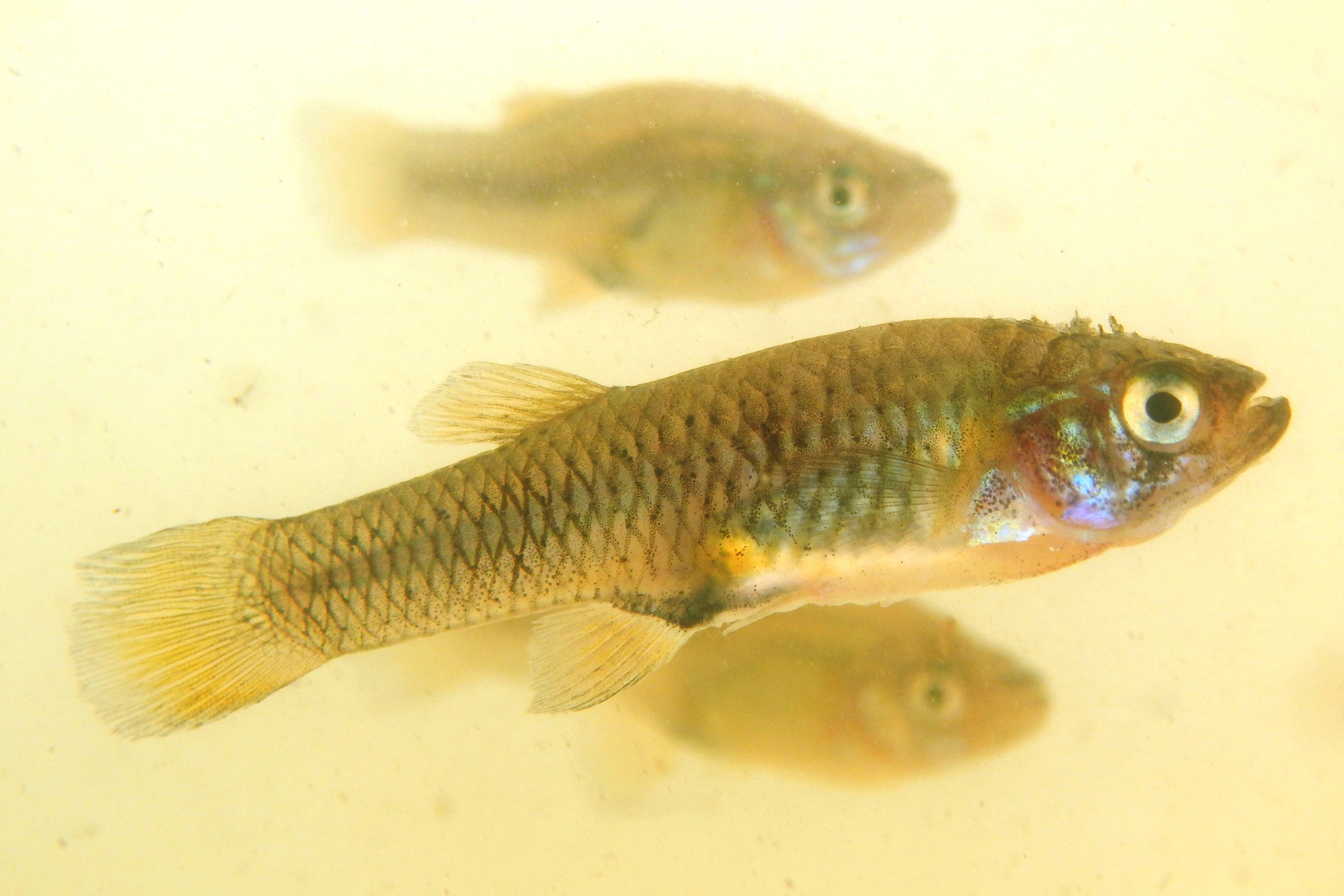

Conservation status
- Endangered (IUCN 3.1)

Scientific classification
- Kingdom: Animalia
- Phylum: Chordata
- Class: Actinopterygii
- Division: Teleostei
- Order: Cyprinodontiformes
- Family: Poeciliidae
- Genus: Gambusia
- Species: G. nobilis

Binomial name
- Gambusia nobilis (S. F. Baird & Girard, 1853)

Synonyms
- Heterandria nobilis S.F. Baird & Girard, 1853

= Pecos gambusia =

Species of fish

The Pecos gambusia (Gambusia nobilis), also known as the Pecos mosquitofish, is a species of fish in the family Poeciliidae endemic to the Pecos River in Texas and New Mexico in the United States. This two-inch species, as most of its family, is a livebearer. Females produce broods of up to 40 fry every four to five days. The fish are omnivorous, eating algae and small invertebrates, and are endangered due to loss of their spring-fed desert habitat.

== Physical description ==
The Pecos gambusia is a small, live-bearing fish that shows distinct differences in size and other morphological features between males and females. Males can reach a maximum length of 32 mm (1.2 in), while females may exceed 60 mm (2.36 in). This species has a dorsally flattened head and a mouth that is significantly angled upwards as the lower jaw is protruding. The back is curved, and the caudal peduncle is notably deep. The color of a Pecos gambusia is a light reddish-brown with a lighter abdomen. The broadly rounded caudal fin has few or no small spots. The male gonopodium or anal fin is elongated while females exhibit a smaller and rounded anal fin.

== Distribution and habitat ==
The Pecos gambusia is endemic to the Pecos River basin in southeastern New Mexico and western Texas. The species inhabits the springs and spring systems. Historically, it inhabited Comanche Springs and Leon Springs drainages of Texas near Fort Stockton as well as a chain of springs within the Toyah drainage. Comanche Springs has since dried, however, the species can still be found in Leon Creek and Toyah drainages. In New Mexico, this species is currently only found in Bitter Lake National Wildlife Refuge and Blue Spring south of Roswell.

Pecos inhabit stenothermal springs, marshes affected by spring flow, and irrigation canals fed by spring water. Populations can also be found in gypsum sinkholes and sedge-covered marshes. They inhabit shallow, clear, and vegetated areas of the springs. They prefer areas with natural cover, such as aquatic vegetation, submerged cliffs, and overhanging banks, tending to avoid open water. They are typically found in the surrounding areas of springheads that experience still water or low-velocity flows.

== Diet and reproduction ==
Pecos gambusia feed on insects found in the top half of the water column, most commonly on the surface. The species feeds throughout the day, but prime feeding time is at night when insect activity is highest. Corixidae and Culicidae are the most common sources of food, but they will prey on insects of a sufficient size.

Pecos gambusia are live-bearing fish. Males use their gonopodium during copulation, females carry fertilized eggs until they hatch internally and young fish emerge from the female. Breeding season is typically from April through August, females typically have one to four broods during this time with an average of around 38 embryos. This species has been found to shift reproductive strategies depending on the season. During early season females focus on caring for many of its small embryos, and fewer, larger offspring later into the season. Females also have shown indication of matrotrophy as they carry embryos at multiple stages of development.

== Conservation status and threats ==
Pecos gambusia is currently listed on the IUCN Red List as endangered and was first federally listed as an endangered species by the U.S. Government in 1970. Pecos often coexist well with other small species of fish that are not of the same species. The western mosquitofish and largespring gambusia, both of which are of the Gambusia genus and often found in similar habitats, bring about problems of hybridization that are of significant concern to Pecos populations due to loss of genetic variation. Another concern for the Pecos gambusia is the degradation of aquatic habitat stemming from a decline in groundwater levels from which the springs they inhabit arise. Other threats include predation and increased competition due to introduced species of fish in their native range. Several reintroduction projects have been done to try and establish additional populations of the species but have been met with very limited success. Recovery plans have shifted towards keeping current populations secure and stable. There have been studies on this species with conservation in mind, including many focusing on preserving genetic integrity in the face of concerns over hybridization. Others have looked at mate-sampling in order to understand the species behavior and inform habitat management and further conservation efforts. A recovery plan for the species was last made in 1983.

== See also ==
- Gambusia
- Mosquito fish
- Endangered Species Act of 1973
- Endangered species
- Conservation in the United States
- Comanche Springs Pupfish
- Chihuahuan Desert
- Southwestern United States
- List of endangered animals of North America
