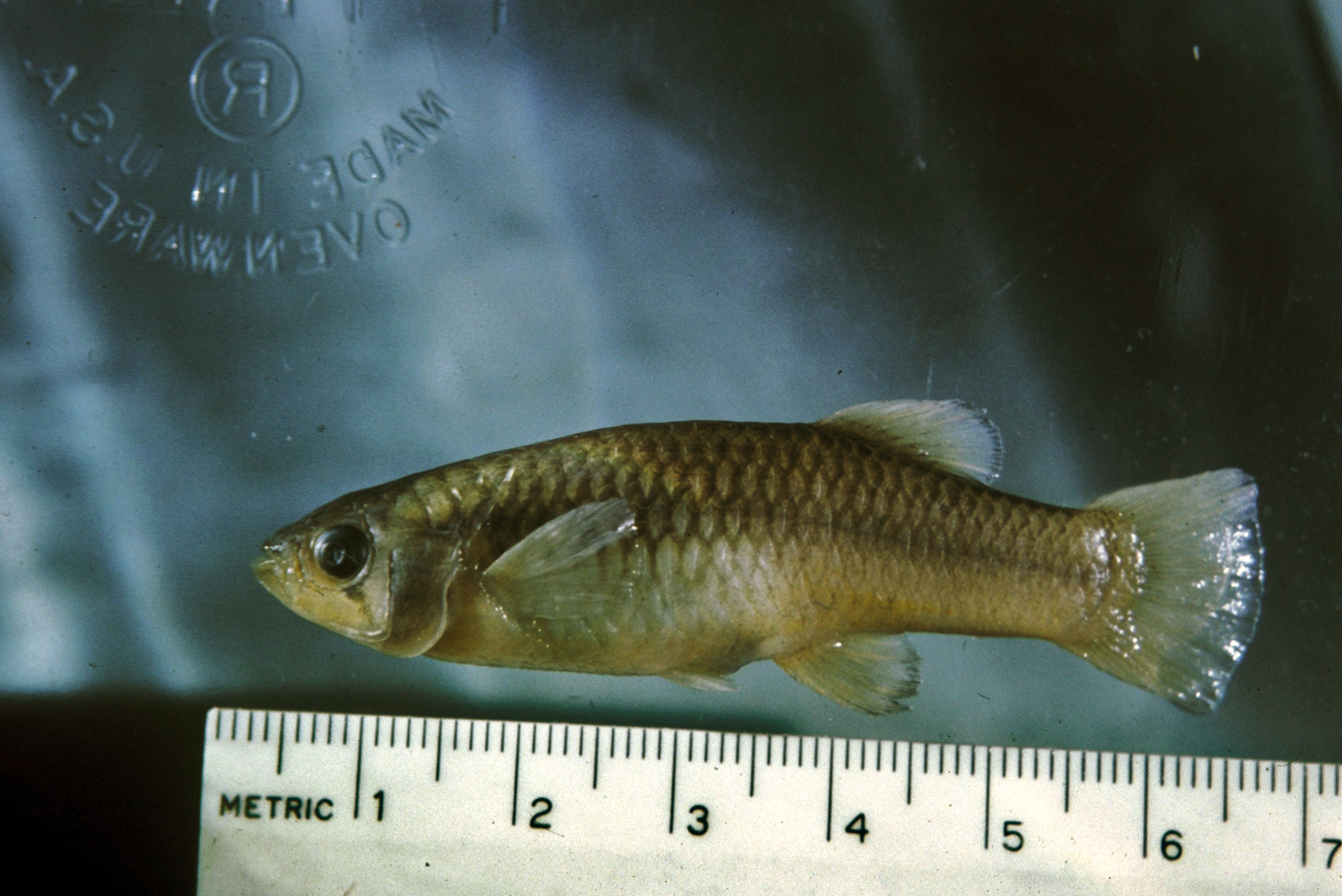

Conservation status
- Vulnerable (IUCN 3.1)

- Endangered (ESA)

Scientific classification
- Kingdom: Animalia
- Phylum: Chordata
- Class: Actinopterygii
- Order: Cyprinodontiformes
- Family: Poeciliidae
- Genus: Gambusia
- Species: G. gaigei

Binomial name
- Gambusia gaigei C. L. Hubbs, 1929

= Big Bend gambusia =

Species of fish

The Big Bend gambusia (Gambusia gaigei) is a rare species of fish in the family Poeciliidae. It is endemic to the Big Bend region of the Rio Grande of the United States and Mexico. The only known remaining population is in a protected pond in the Big Bend National Park.

This livebearer is about 2 inches (5.1 cm) long. It feeds on aquatic invertebrates.

This species was described by the American ichthyologist Carl Leavitt Hubbs in 1929 from a type collected in slough close to the Rio Grande at Boquillas, Brewster County, Texas by Frederick McMahon Gaige (1890–1976), a zoologist who was director of the Zoological Museum of the University of Michigan. The specific name honours Gaige.
