= Gambusia krumholzi =

Spotfin gambusia

Conservation status
- Vulnerable (IUCN 3.1)

Scientific classification
- Kingdom: Animalia
- Phylum: Chordata
- Class: Actinopterygii
- Order: Cyprinodontiformes
- Family: Poeciliidae
- Genus: Gambusia
- Species: G. krumholzi

Binomial name
- Gambusia krumholzi W. L. Minckley, 1963

Species of fish

Gambusia krumholzi, the spotfin gambusia, is a species of fish in the family Poeciliidae endemic to Mexico.

The fish is named in honor of Louis A. Krumholz (1909–1981) of the University of Louisville (Kentucky, USA), for his contributions to the knowledge of aquatic biology.
