= Mangrove gambusia =

Conservation status
- Least Concern (IUCN 3.1)

- Vulnerable (NatureServe)

Scientific classification
- Kingdom: Animalia
- Phylum: Chordata
- Class: Actinopterygii
- Order: Cyprinodontiformes
- Family: Poeciliidae
- Genus: Gambusia
- Species: G. rhizophorae

Binomial name
- Gambusia rhizophorae Rivas, 1969

Species of fish

Female above, male below.

The Mangrove gambusia (Gambusia rhizophorae) is a tropical poeciliid (live bearing) fish species with a restricted, disjunct range one in northwestern Cuba, the other in southeastern Florida. The Florida population has been recently listed as "biologically vulnerable" (vulnerable to extinction because of the taxon's biology or other indicators) by the Florida Fish and Wildlife Conservation Commission.

== Species description ==
The Mangrove gambusia is a brackish fish, typically a resident of sheltered mangrove forests. In Florida, the species is distributed from Fort Lauderdale, south along the mainland coast, and throughout the Florida Keys to Key West. Its distribution in Florida appears to be temperature limited (Getter, 1982). The exact location of the Cuban population is being examined to allow a map of its distribution to be produced.

Florida populations of Mangrove gambusia in relation to 17 degree winter isotherm from data of Charles Getter

== Conservation ==
Habitat destruction for development has reduced available habitats through loss of a number of mangrove forests and formerly occupied sites (Charles Getter, 1976) in Florida. Also contributing to biological vulnerability is the species' limited habitat, temperature restrictions, and hybridization with other species throughout its range (Charles Getter, 1976). One of the largest populations known for the Mangrove gambusia was the lush 100+ acre mangrove forest known as the "Cocoplum Islands" that was developed into the Cocoplum Development in the mid-1970s.

== Biology and life history ==
Ongoing research is underway by Dr. Charles Getter, who has studied the species since the 1970s.
