= List of fishes of Kansas =

The location of the State of Kansas in the United States of America.

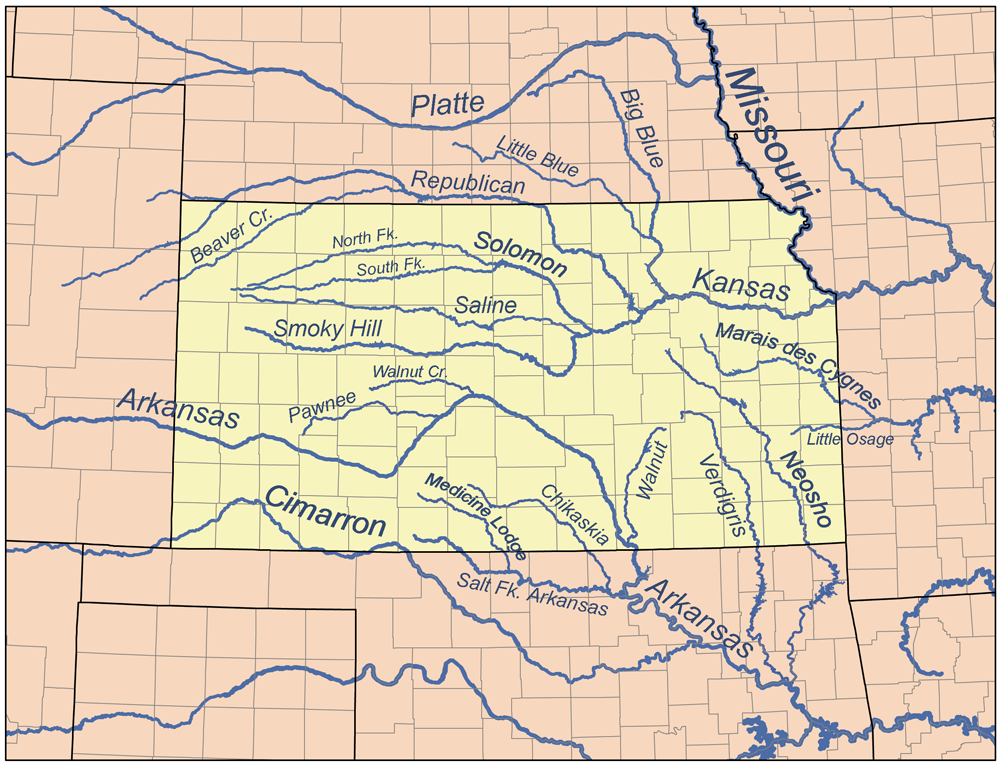
A labelled map of the major rivers in Kansas

There are roughly 135 recorded species of fish in the U.S. State of Kansas. This list is an amalgamation of the works Cross & Collins books Handbook of Fishes of Kansas (1967) and Fishes in Kansas (1995) as well as Current Status of Native Fish Species in Kansas (2005) by multiple authors and the Pocket Guide of Kansas Stream Fishes by Jessica Mounts (2017). The following tags note species in each of those categories:

- (I) - Introduced
- (Ex) - Extirpated
- (Pe) - Possibly extirpated

== Background ==
Kansas is located in the Great Plains region which is characterized by mostly slow-running rivers and a near total absence of large naturally occurring lakes excluding oxbows and a few shallow salt marshes and sloughs. Since the European settlement of the area, many rivers and creeks have been dammed creating large reservoirs, largely by the United States Army Corps of Engineers and the Bureau of Reclamation. The biggest of these reservoirs is Milford Lake at 15,709 acres (6,357 ha). Kansas is home to 12 rivers basins, all of which drain into the Gulf of Mexico approximately 507 miles (816 km) south.

== Order Petromyzontiformes (lampreys) ==
Family Petromyzontidae (northern lampreys)

- Chestnut lamprey (Ichthyomyzon castaneus) (Ex)

== Order Acipenseriformes (sturgeons and paddlefish) ==
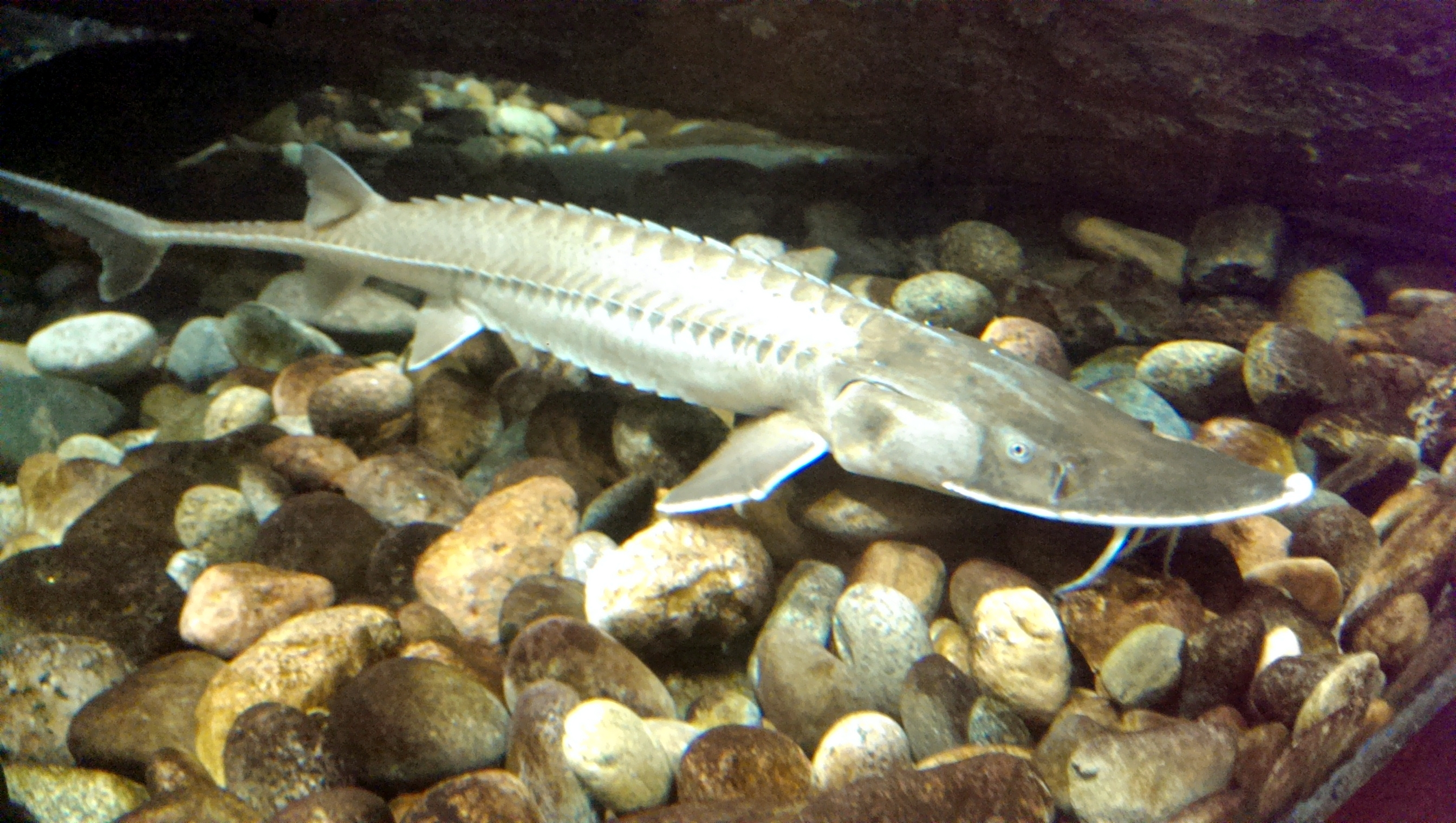
The Shovelnose sturgeon is the only sturgeon that has been recorded in Kansas since 1998

Family Acipenseridae (sturgeons)

- Lake sturgeon (Acipenser fulvescens) (Ex)
- Pallid sturgeon (Scaphirhynchus albus) (Pe)
- Shovelnose sturgeon (Scaphirhynchus platorynchus)

Family Polyodontidae (paddlefish)

- American paddlefish (Polyodon spathula)

== Order Lepisosteiformes (gars) ==
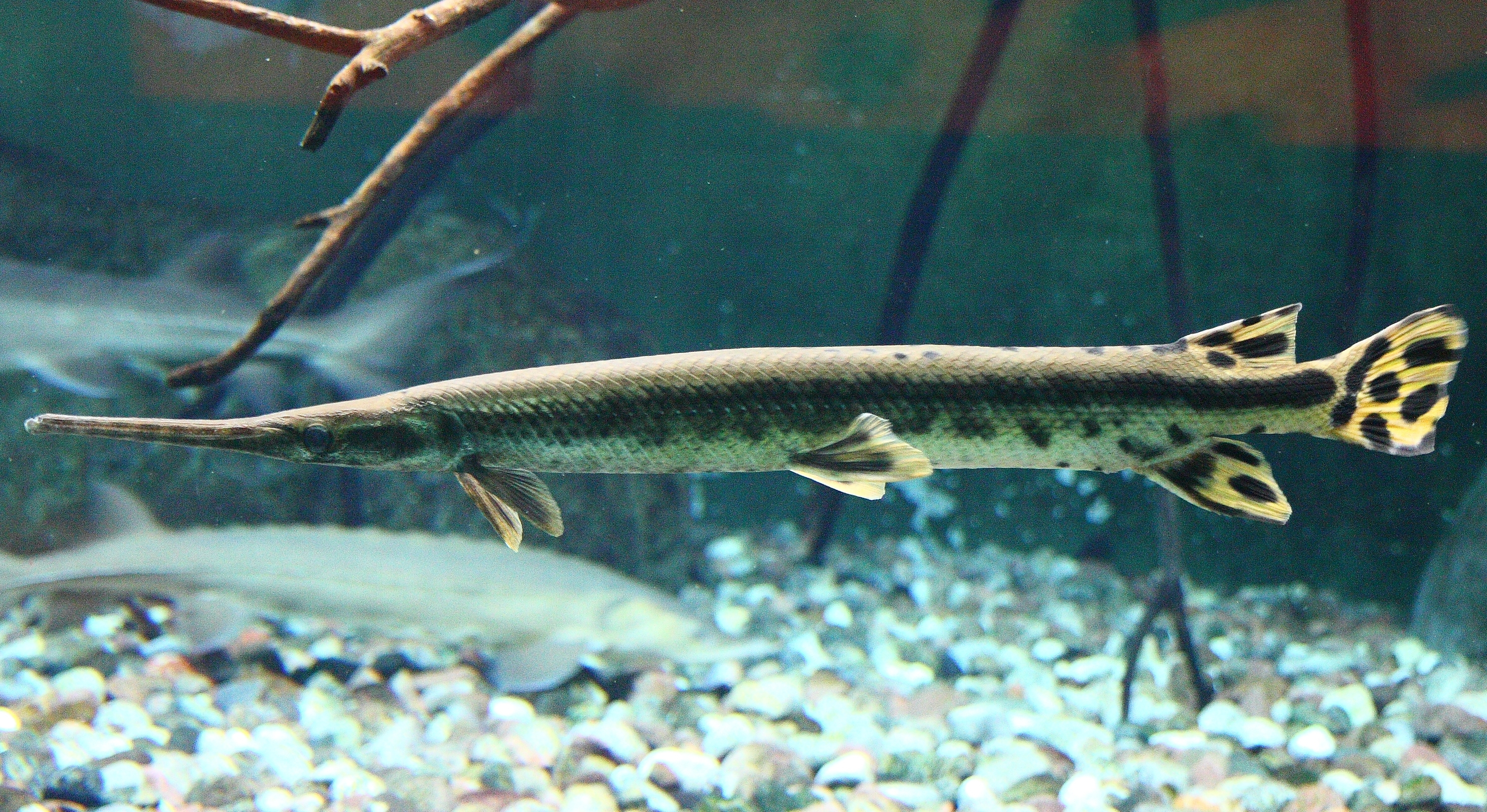
Longnose gar is the largest and most widespread predatory fish in Kansas

Family Lepisosteidae (gars)

- Spotted gar (Lepisosteus oculatus)
- Longnose gar (Lepisosteus osseus)
- Shortnose gar (Lepisosteus platostomus)

== Order Hiodontiformes (mooneyes) ==
Family Hiodontidae (mooneyes)

- Goldeye (Hiodon alosoides)

== Order Anguilliformes (eels) ==
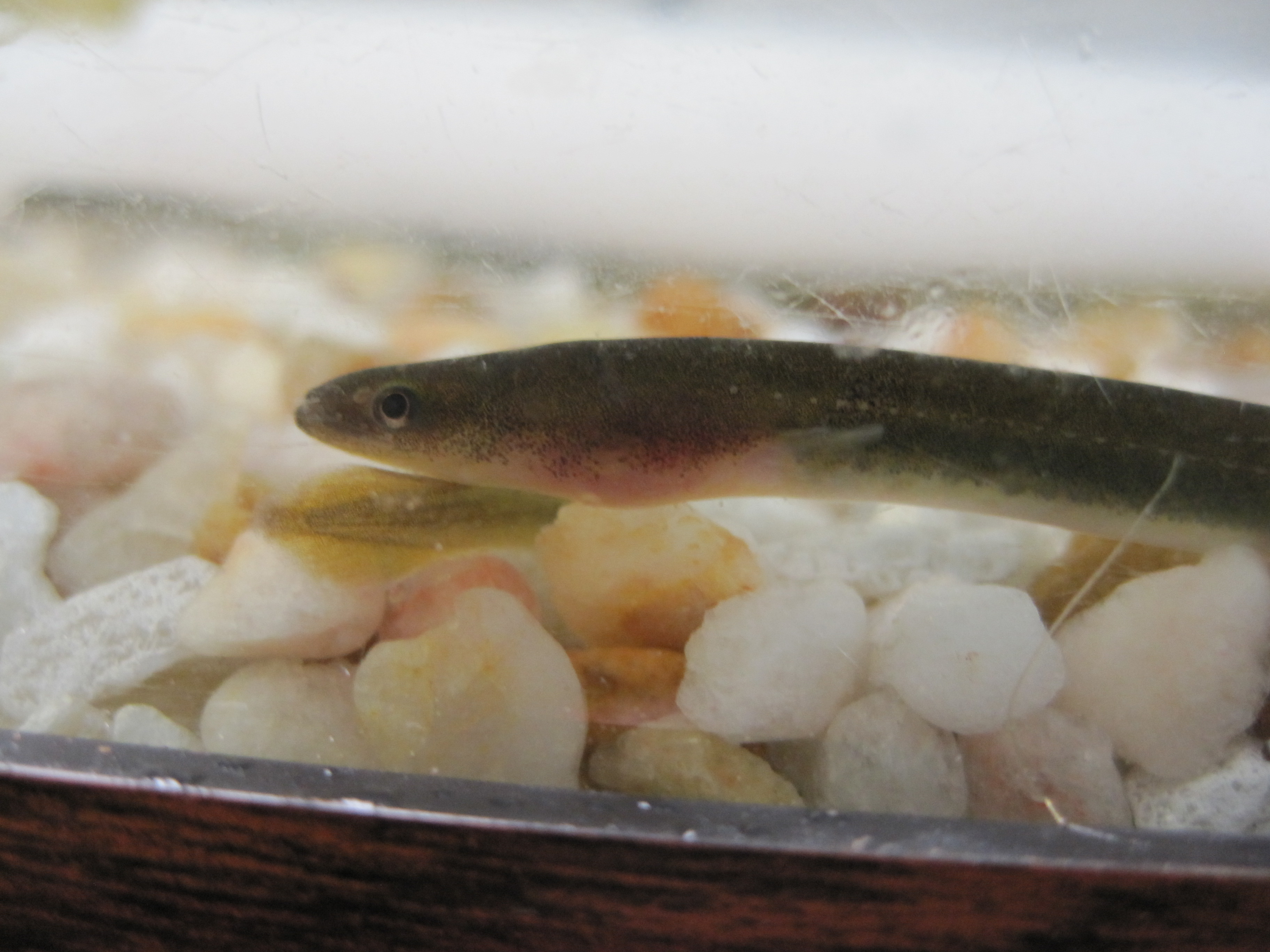
Formerly ranging statewide, the last recorded capture of an American eel was in 1987 from the Kansas River

Family Anguillidae (feshwater eels)

- American eel (Anguilla rostrata) (Pe)

== Order Clupeiformes (herrings and relatives) ==
Family Alosidae (shads and sardines)

- Skipjack shad (Alosa chrysochloris)
- American gizzard shad (Dorosoma cepedianum)
- Threadfin shad (Dorosoma petenense) (I) (Ex)

== Order Cypriniformes (carps, minnows, and relatives) ==
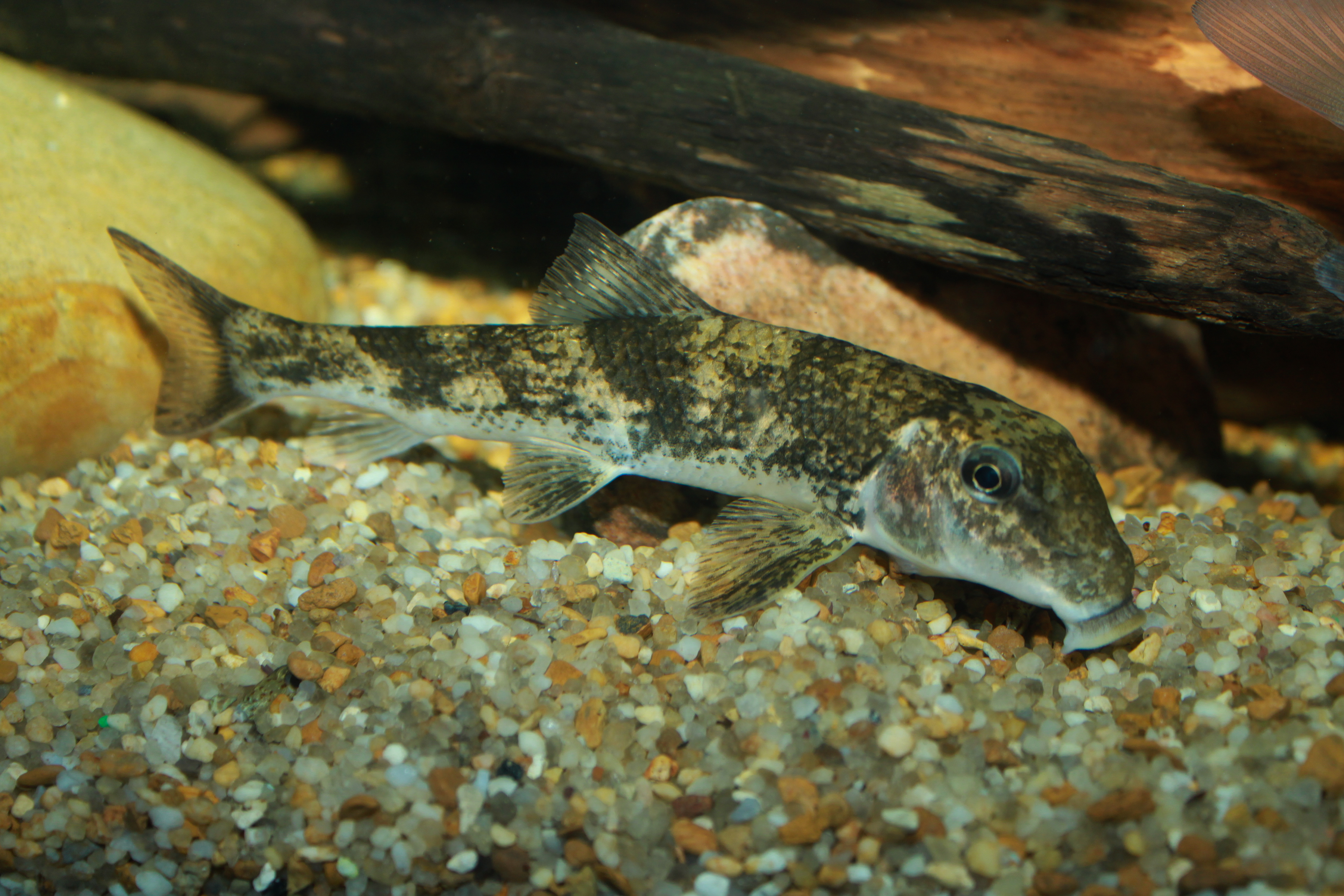
The northern hogsucker and the black redhorse are restricted to Shoal Creek in Cherokee County due to a decline in ideal habitat

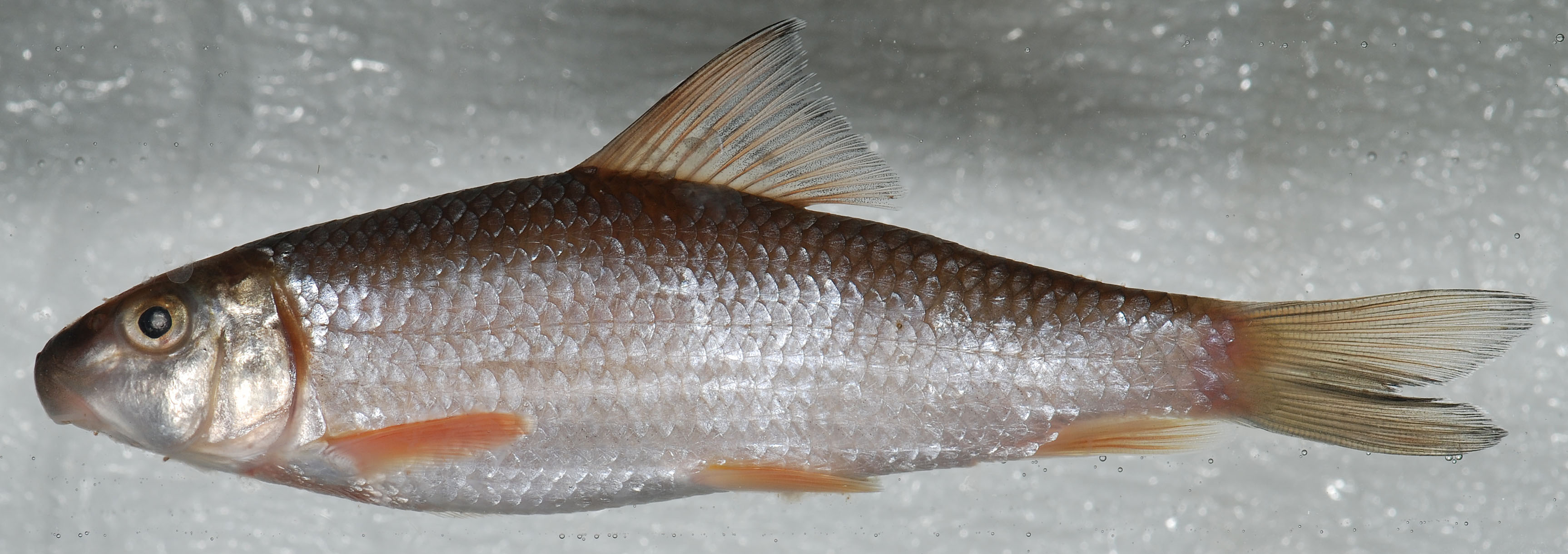
Golden redhorse is found throughout Southeast Kansas

Family Catostomidae (suckers)

- River carpsucker (Carpiodes carpio)
- Quillback (Carpiodes cyprinus)
- Highfin carpsucker (Carpiodes velifer)
- White sucker (Catostomus commersonii)
- Blue sucker (Cycleptus elongatus)
- Northern hogsucker (Hypentelium nigricans)
- Smallmouth buffalo (Ictiobus bubalus)
- Bigmouth buffalo (Ictiobus cyprinellus)
- Black buffalo (Ictiobus niger)
- Spotted sucker (Minytrema melanops)
- River redhorse (Moxostoma carinatum)
- Black redhorse (Moxostoma duquesnii)
- Golden redhorse (Moxostoma erythrurum)
- Shorthead redhorse (Moxostoma macrolepidotum)
- Pealip redhorse (Moxostoma pisolabrum)

Family Cyprinidae (cyprinids)

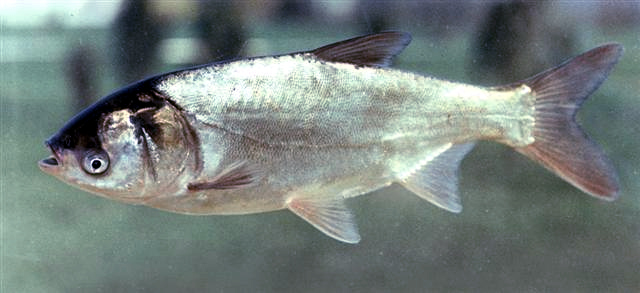
Silver carp have been found in the Kansas, Missouri, and Nemaha River systems

- Goldfish (Carassius auratus) (I)
- Grass carp (Ctenopharyngodon idella) (I)
- European carp (Cyprinus carpio) (I)
- Amur carp (Cyprinus rubrofuscus) (I)
- Silver carp (Hypophthalmichthys molitrix) (I)
- Bighead carp (Hypophthalmichthys nobilis) (I)
- Black carp (Mylopharyngodon piceus (I)

Family Leuciscidae (true minnows)

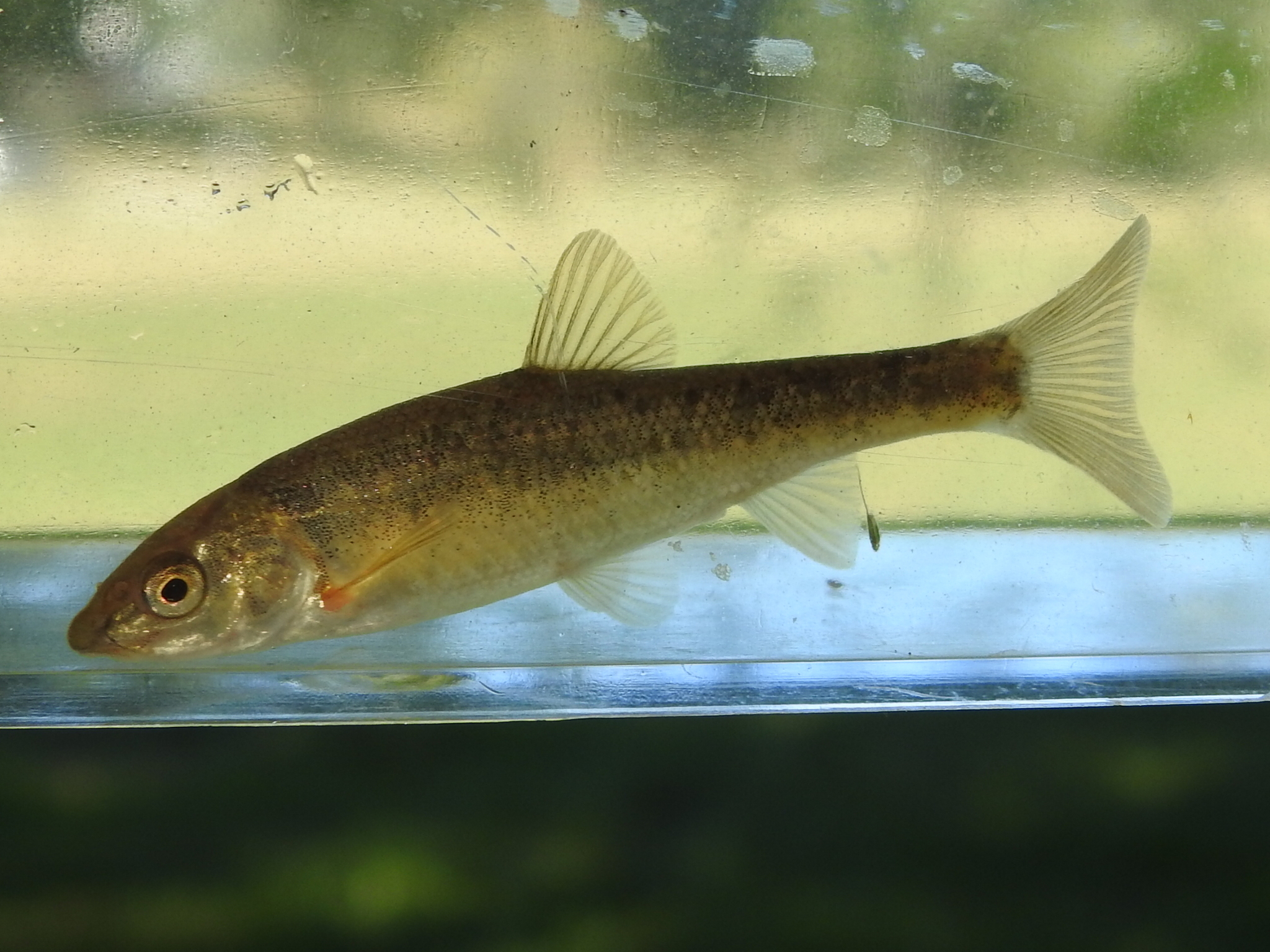
Central stoneroller can be found in small streams and the channelized portions of rivers.

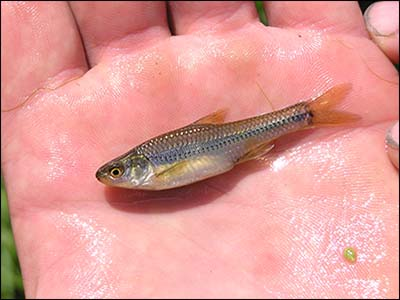
The Topeka shiner is named after Topeka, Kansas

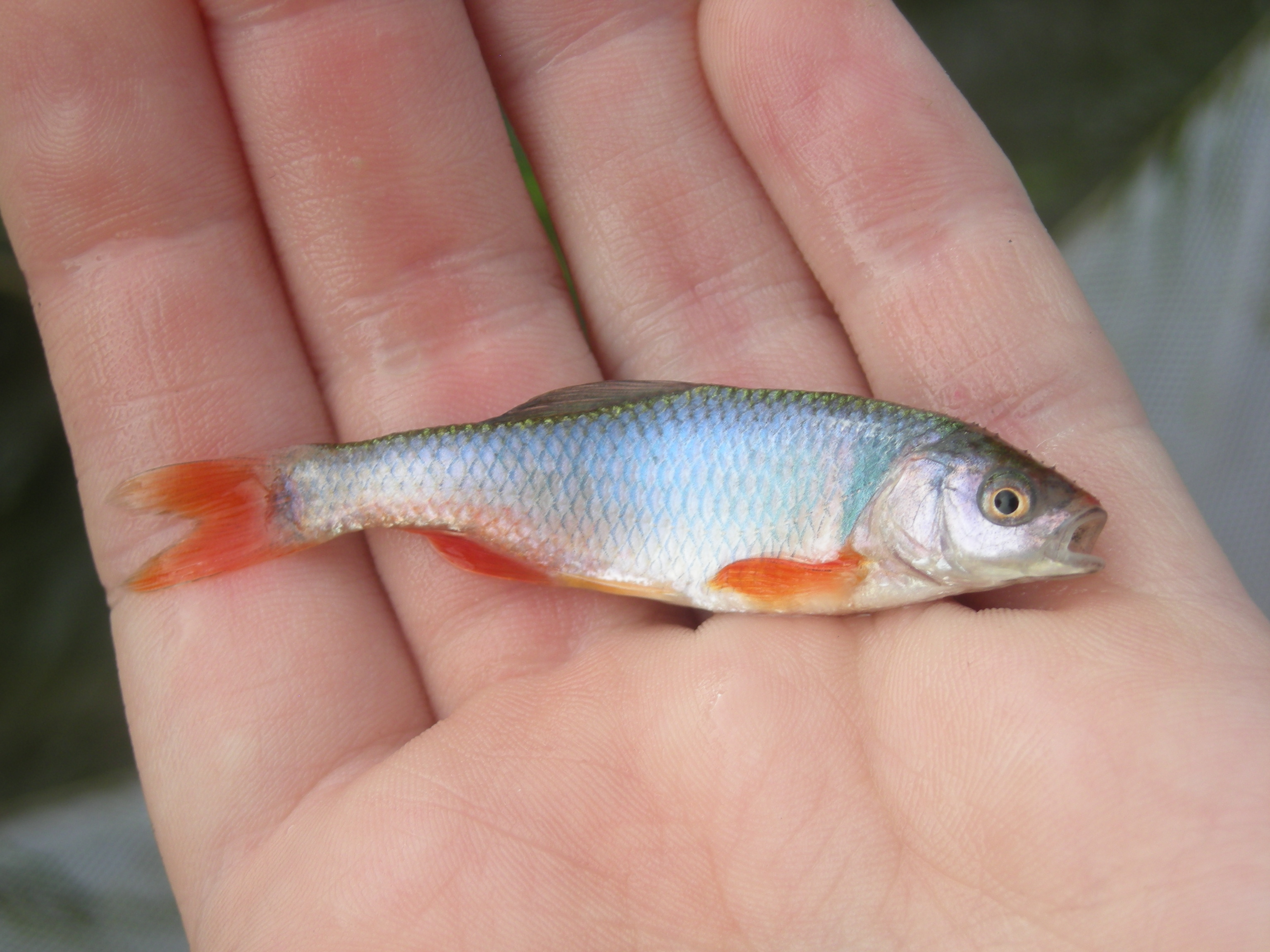
The red shiner can be found in most waterways in Kansas

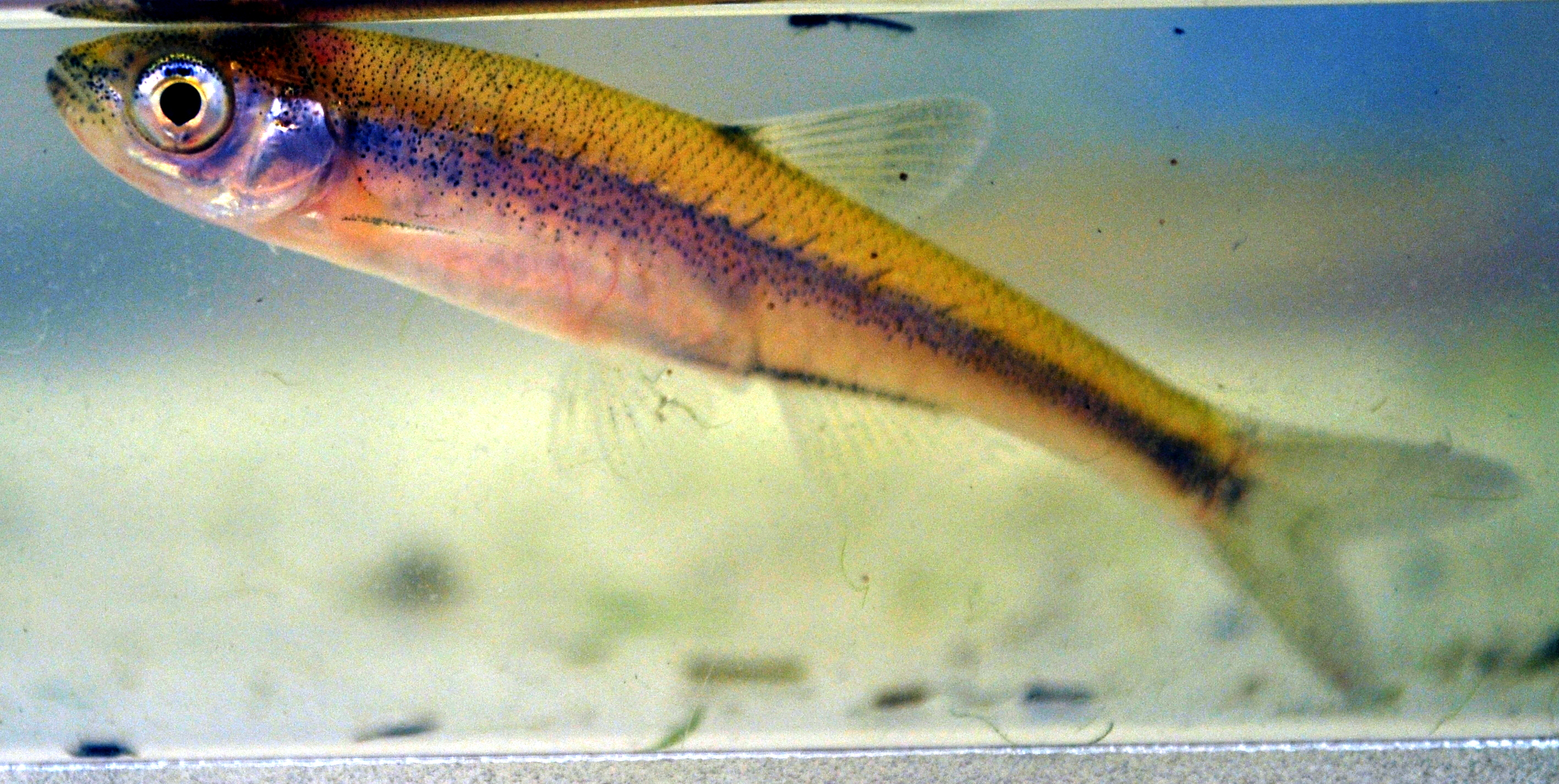
Bigeye shiner is found in the Verdigris, Caney, and Spring Rivers in Southeast Kansas

- Central stoneroller (Campostoma anomalum)
- Bluntface shiner (Cyprinella camura)
- Red shiner (Cyprinella lutrensis)
- Spotfin shiner (Cyprinella spiloptera)
- Gravel chub (Erimystax x-punctatus)
- Speckled chub (Extrarius aestivalis)
- Western silvery minnow (Hybognathus argyritis)
- Brassy minnow (Hybognathus hankinsoni)
- Plains minnow (Hybognathus placitus)
- Bigmouth shiner (Hybopsis dorsalis)
- Cardinal shiner (Luxilus cardinalis)
- Striped shiner (Luxilus chrysocephalus)
- Common shiner (Luxilus cornutus)
- Redfin shiner (Lythrurus umbratilis)
- Sturgeon chub (Macrhybopsis gelida)
- Sicklefin chub (Macrhybopsis meeki)
- Silver chub (Macrhybopsis storeriana)
- Hornyhead chub (Nocomis biguttatus)
- Redspot chub (Nocomis asper)
- Golden shiner (Notemigonus crysoleucas)
- Emerald shiner (Notropis atherinoides)
- Red River shiner (Notropis bairdi)
- River shiner (Notropis blennius)
- Bigeye shiner (Notropis boops)
- Ghost shiner (Notropis buchanani)
- Pugnose minnow (Notropis emiliae) (Ex)
- Arkansas River shiner (Notropis girardi) (Ex)
- Blacknose shiner (Notropis heterolepis) (Ex)
- Sand shiner (Notropis ludibundus)
- Ozark minnow (Notropis nubilus)
- Carmine shiner (Notropis percobromus)
- Rosyface shiner (Notropis rubellus)
- Topeka shiner (Notropis topeka)
- Mimic shiner (Notropis volucellus)
- Suckermouth minnow (Phenacobius mirabilis)
- Southern redbelly dace (Phoxinus erythrogaster)
- Bluntnose minnow (Pimephales notatus)
- Fathead minnow (Pimephales promelas)
- Slim minnow (Pimephales tenellus)
- Bullhead minnow (Pimephales vigilax)
- Flathead chub (Platygobio gracilis)
- Western blacknose dace (Rhinichthys obtusus)
- Creek chub (Semotilus atromaculatus)

== Order Siluriformes (catfishes) ==
Family Ictaluridae (North American freshwater catfishes)

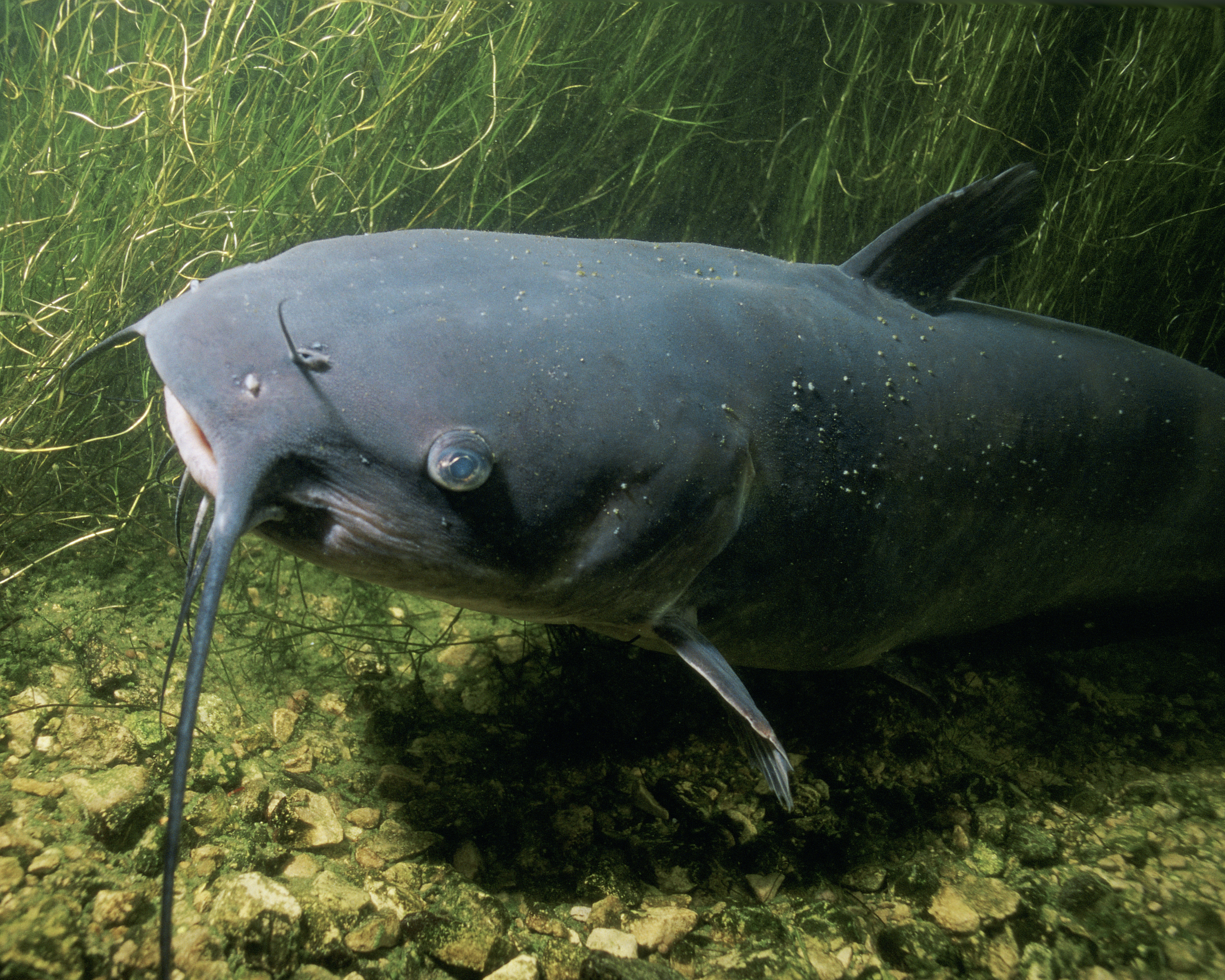
Channel catfish is the state fish of Kansas

- Black bullhead (Ameiurus melas)
- Yellow bullhead (Ameiurus natalis)
- Brown bullhead (Ameiurus nebulosus) (I) (Pe)
- Blue catfish (Ictalurus furcatus)
- Channel catfish (Ictalurus punctatus)
- Slender madtom (Noturus exilis)
- Stonecat (Noturus flavus)
- Tadpole madtom (Noturus gyrinus)
- Brindled madtom (Noturus miurus)
- Freckled madtom (Noturus noctumus)
- Neosho madtom (Noturus placidus)
- Flathead catfish (Pylodictis olivaris)

== Order Esociformes (pikes and mudminnows) ==
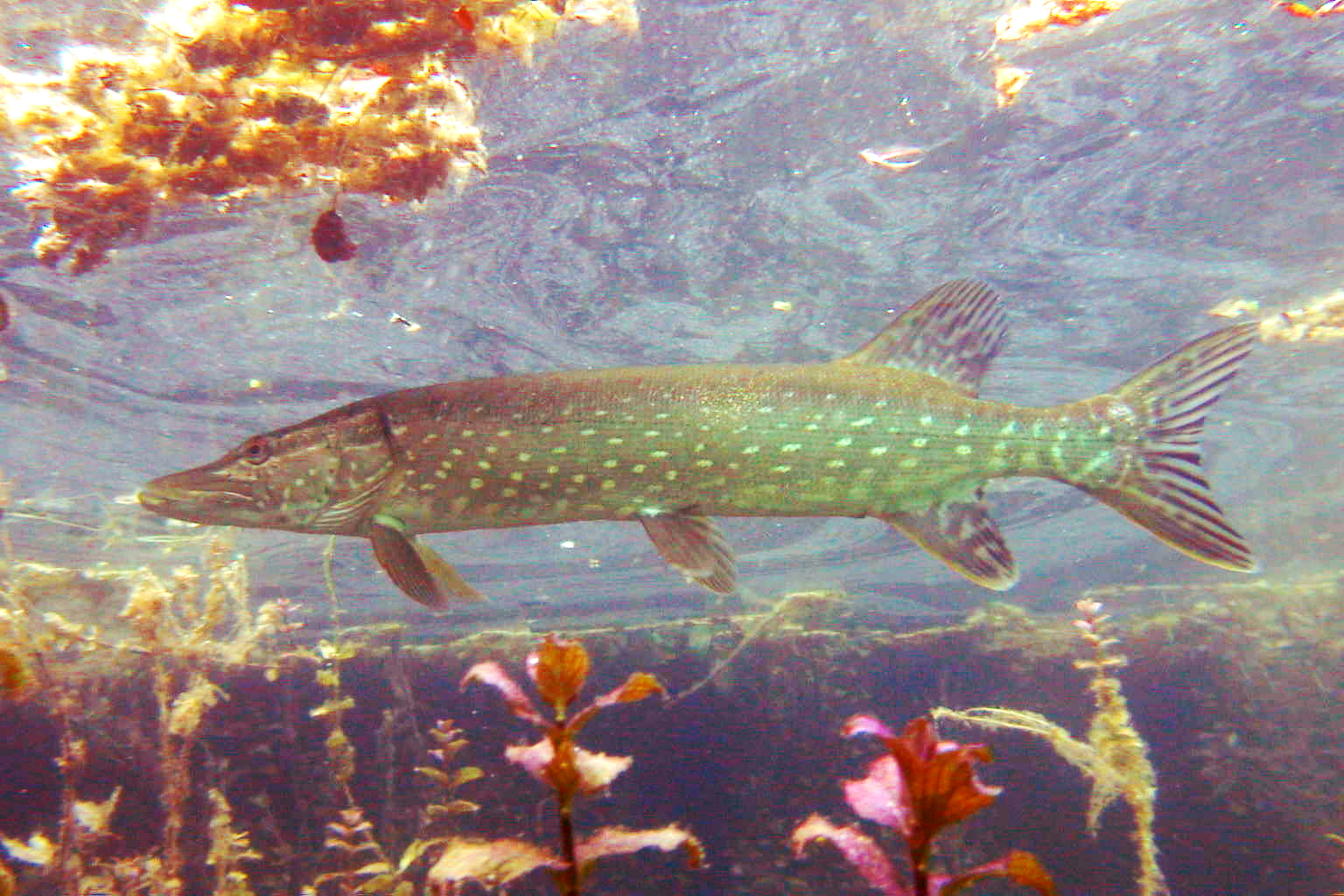
Northern pike is present in most large reservoirs in Kansas

Family Esocidae (pikes)

- Northern pike (Esox lucius) (I)

== Order Gadiformes (cods) ==
Family Lotidae (lingcods)

- Burbot (Lota lota) (Ex)

== Order Cyprinodontiformes (toothcarps) ==
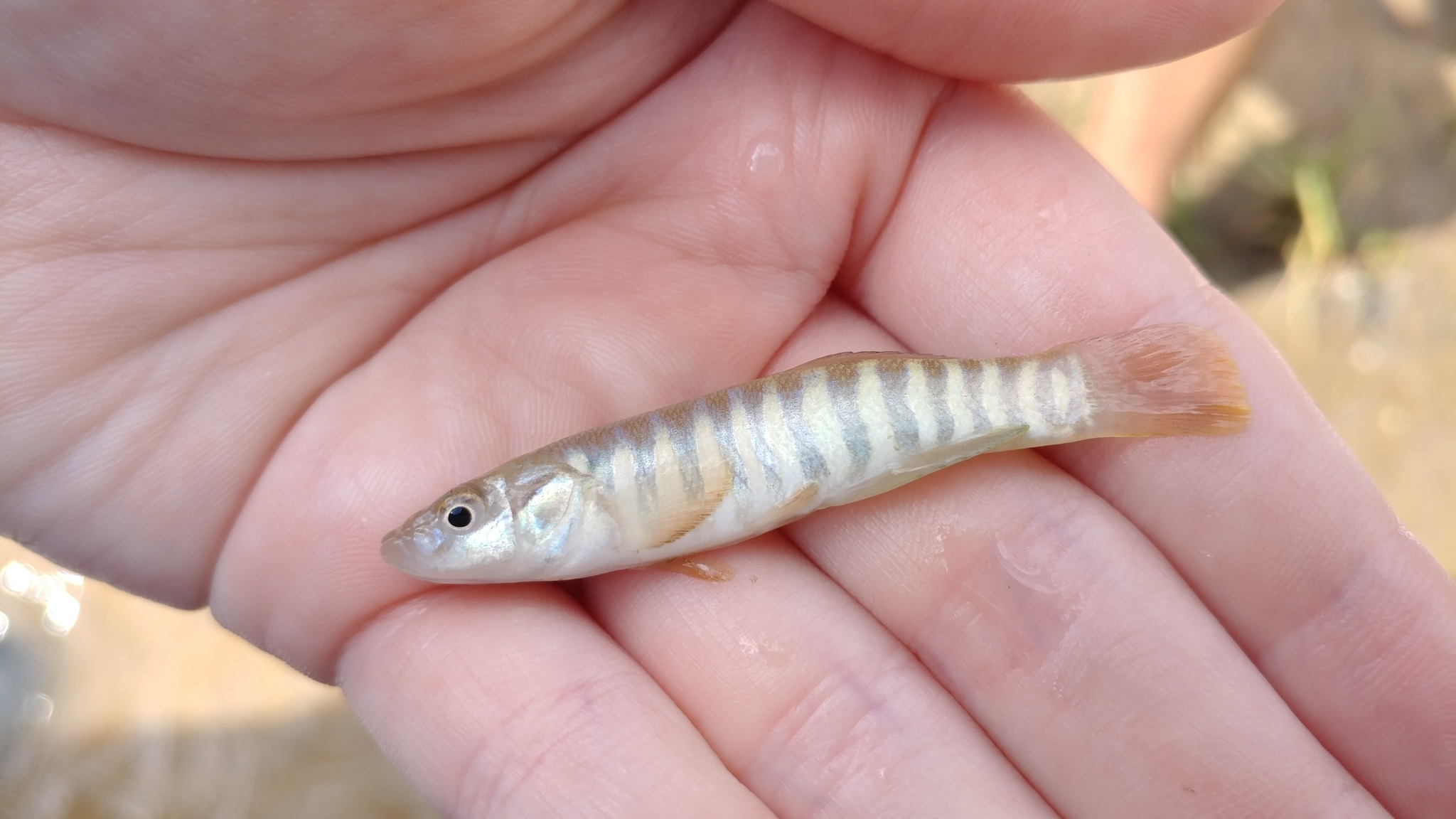
The Plains killifish is among the most dominant fish in western Kansas, being able to handle more salinity than most other fish

Family Fundulidae (topminnows and killifish)

- Northern studfish (Fundulus catenatus)
- Blackstripe topminnow (Fundulus notatus)
- Plains topminnow (Fundulus sciadicus)
- Plains killifish (Fundulus zebrinus)

Family Poeciliidae (livebearers)

- Western mosquitofish (Gambusia affini) (I)

Family Atherinidae (silversides)

- Brook silverside (Labidesthes sicculus)
- Mississippi silverside (Menidia audens)

== Order Scorpaeniformes (sculpins) ==
Family Cottidae (sculpins)

- Banded sculpin (Cottus carolinae)

== Order Perciformes (perch-like fish) ==
Family Moronidae (temperate basses)

- White bass (Morone chrysops)
- Striped bass (Morone saxatilis) (I)

Family Centrarchidae (Sunfishes)

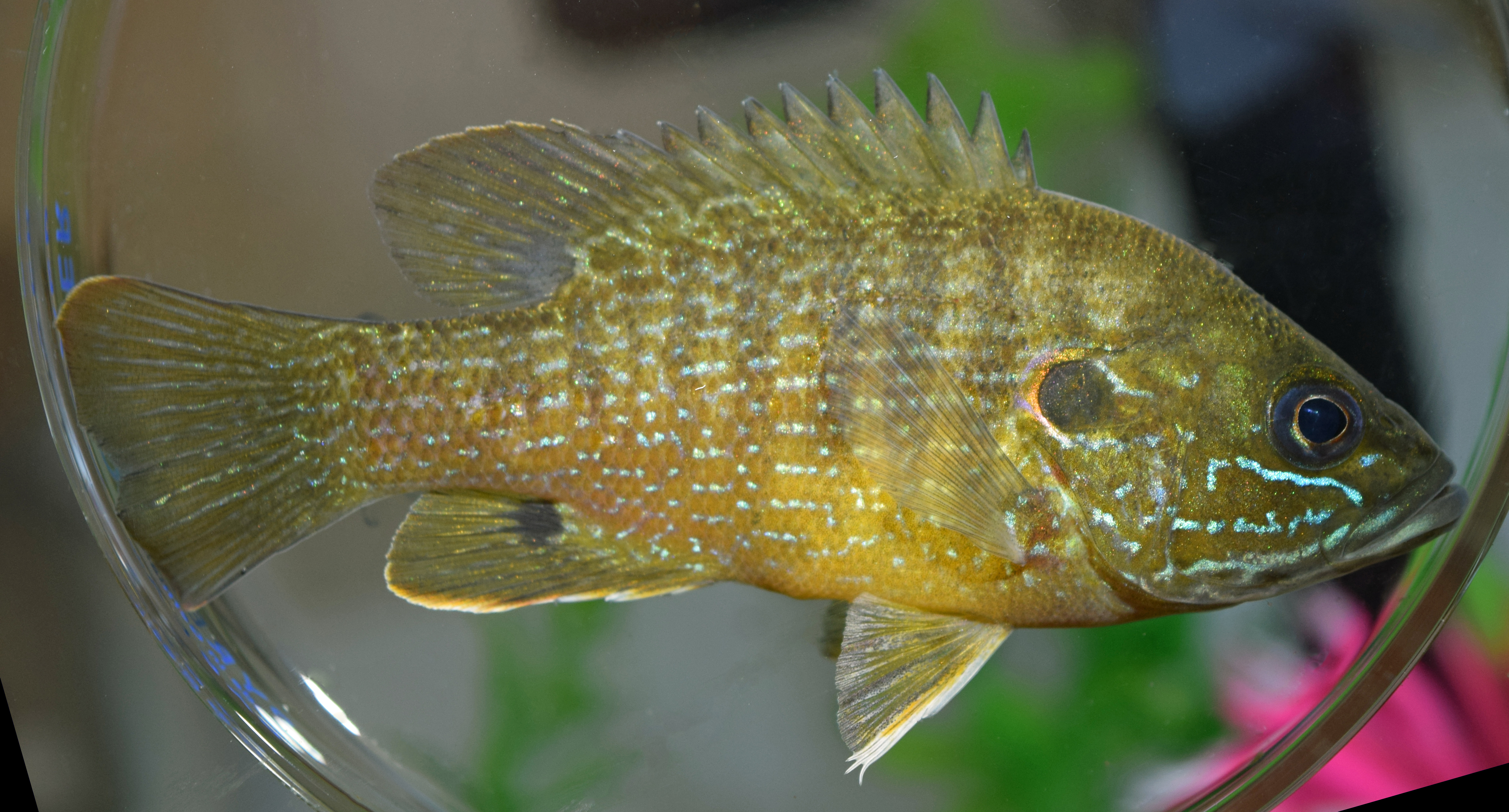
Green sunfish is the most abundant sunfish in Kansas

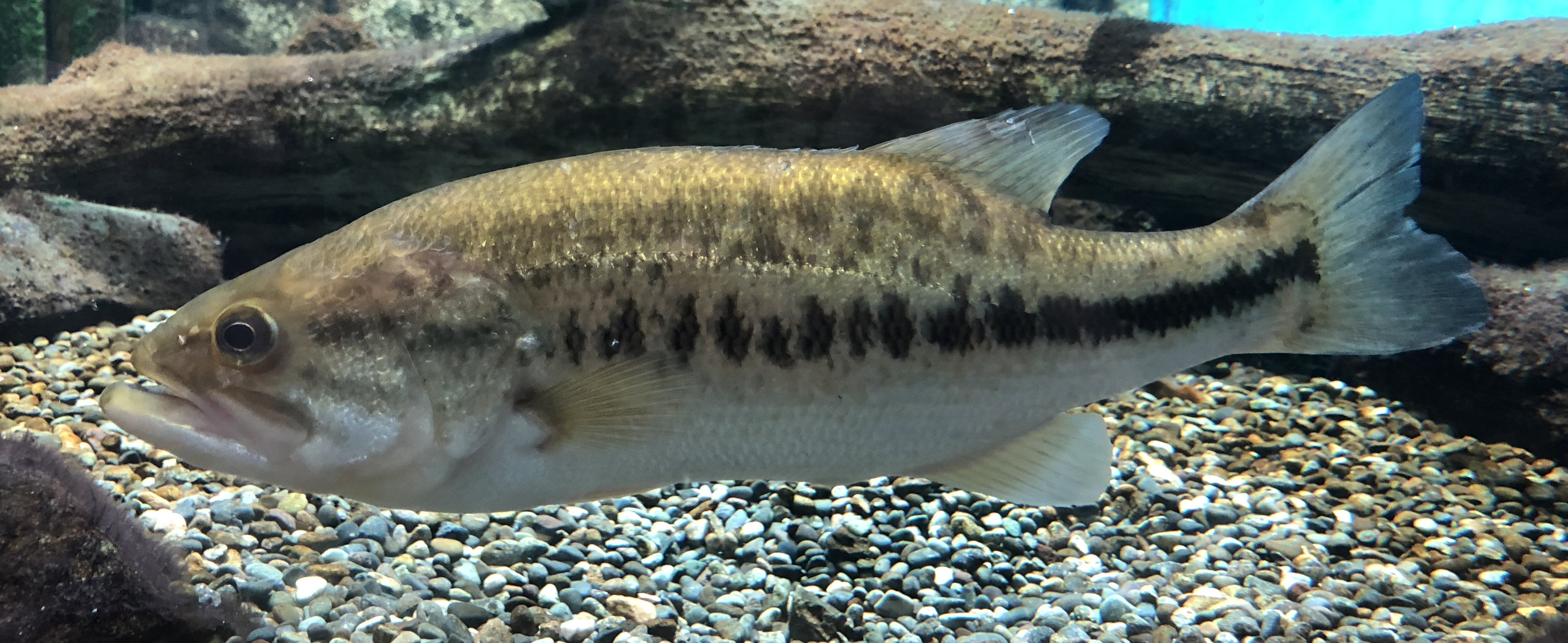
Largemouth bass is a highly prized gamefish through Kansas

- Rock bass (Ambloplites rupestris) (I)
- Green sunfish (Lepomis cyanellus)
- Warmouth (Lepomis gulosus)
- Orangespotted sunfish (Lepomis humilis)
- Bluegill (Lepomis macrochirus)
- Longear sunfish (Lepomis megalotis)
- Redear sunfish (Lepomis microlophus) (I)
- Smallmouth bass (Micropterus dolomieu)
- Spotted bass (Micropterus punctulatus)
- Largemouth bass (Micropterus salmoides)
- White crappie (Pomoxis annularis)
- Black crappie (Pomoxis nigromaculatus) (I)

Family Percidae (perches)

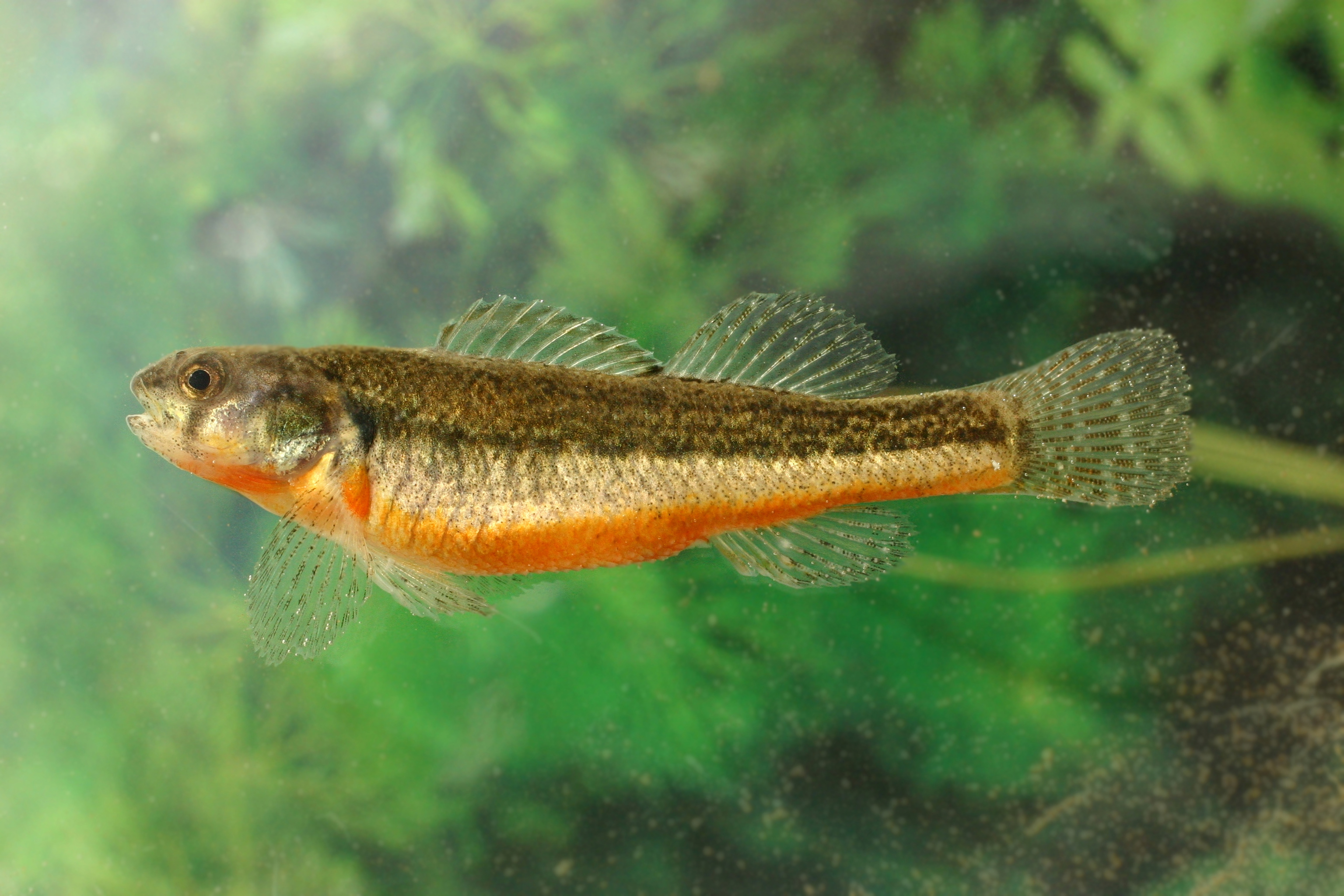
The Arkansas darter is endemic to the Arkansas River system, and was first discovered near Garden City in 1885

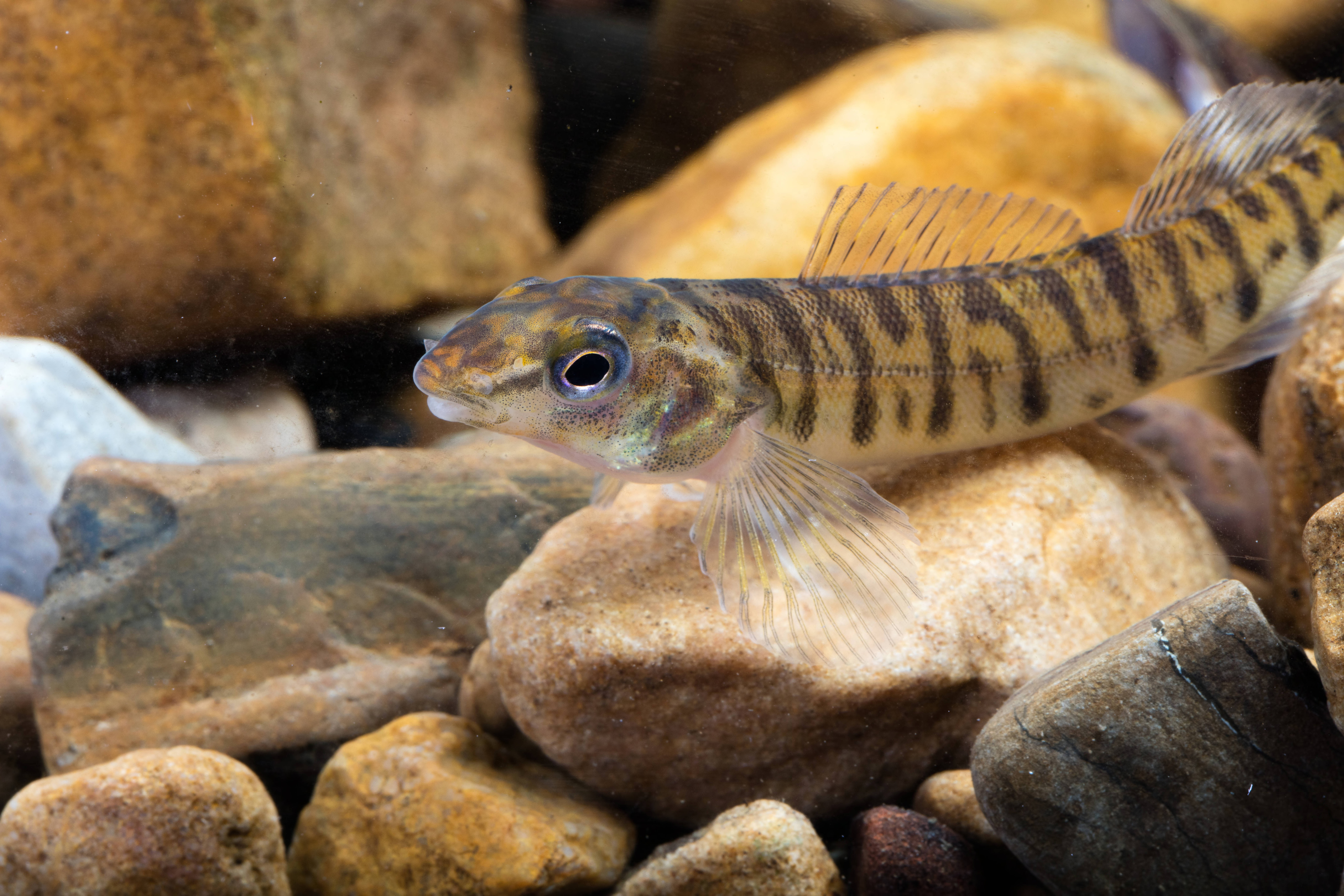
Logperch is found throughout tributaries in eastern Kansas

- Greenside darter (Etheostoma blennioides)
- Bluntnose darter (Etheostoma chlorosomum)
- Arkansas darter (Etheostoma cragini)
- Fantail darter (Etheostoma flabellare)
- Slough darter (Etheostoma gracile)
- Least darter (Etheostoma microperca)
- Johnny darter (Etheostoma nigrum)
- Stippled darter (Etheostoma punctulatum)
- Orangethroat darter (Etheostoma spectabile)
- Speckled darter (Etheostoma stigmaeum)
- Redfin darter (Etheostoma whipplii)
- Banded darter (Etheostoma zonale)
- Yellow perch (Perca flavescens) (I)
- Ozark logperch (Percina fulvitaenia)
- Common logperch (Percina caprodes)
- Channel darter (Percina copelandi)
- Blackside darter (Percina maculata)
- Slenderhead darter (Percina phoxocephala)
- River darter (Percina shumardi)
- Sauger (Stizostedion canadense)
- Walleye (Stizostedion vitreum) (I)

Family Sciaenidae (drums)

- Freshwater drum (Aplodinotus grunniens)
