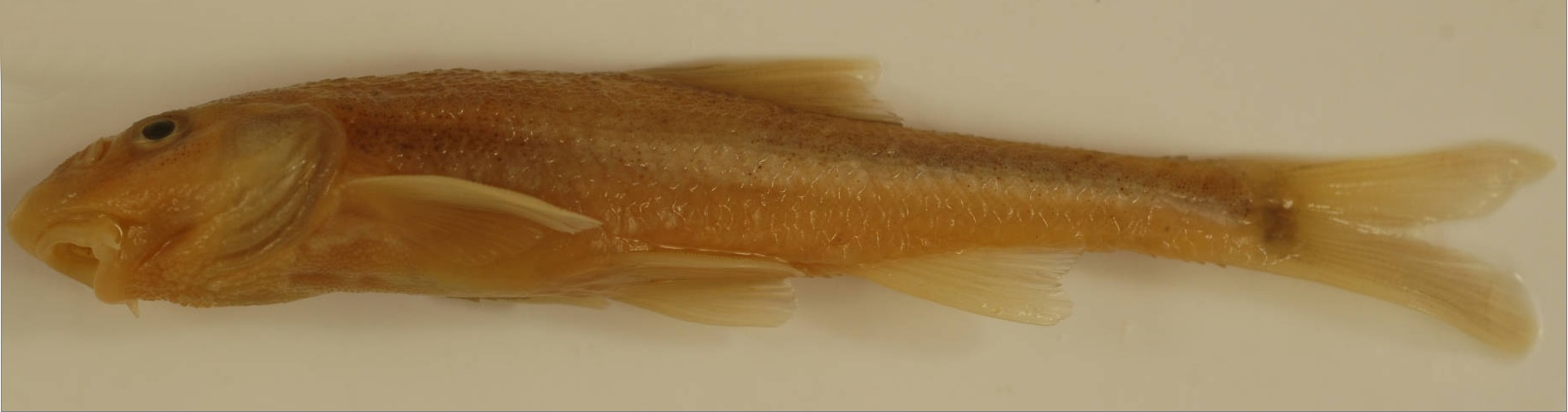

Conservation status
- Least Concern (IUCN 3.1)

Scientific classification
- Kingdom: Animalia
- Phylum: Chordata
- Class: Actinopterygii
- Order: Cypriniformes
- Family: Leuciscidae
- Subfamily: Pogonichthyinae
- Genus: Macrhybopsis
- Species: M. gelida

Binomial name
- Macrhybopsis gelida (Girard, 1856)

Synonyms
- Gobio gelidus Girard, 1856; Hybopsis gelida (Girard, 1856)

= Sturgeon chub =

Species of fish

The sturgeon chub (Macrhybopsis gelida) is a species of freshwater ray-finned fish belonging to the family Leuciscidae, the shiners, daces and minnows. It is found only in the United States. It is a species of concern in the Charles M. Russell National Wildlife Refuge in Montana.

== Names and documentation ==
The type species was collected in the Milk River in Montana, and described by Charles Frédéric Girard in 1856. Girard named it Gobio gelidus, but it was reclassified as Hybopsis gelidus in 1900 and Macrhybopsis gelidus in 1935. A new classification of Hybopsis gelida was suggested in 1965.

== Description and habitat ==
The sturgeon chub is slender, streamlined fish with a long, flat snout. The snout resembles that of a sturgeon, which gives the fish its name. Adults grow to be about 3 inches (7.6 cm) in length. There is a small barbel near the corner of the mouth, and small pustules on the throat. The scales on the sturgeon chub's back and sides have a small ridge-like projection known as a "keel". The purpose of the keel is not established, but may help the fish stabilize and orient itself in fast currents or as a means of detecting currents. The eyes are small and it does not see well. The fish's color ranges from silvery-white on the belly to silvery sides, with a light-brown back. The tail is deeply forked, with the lower lobe darker than the upper lobe. The body fins are triangular, slightly rounded, and straight-edged (unlike the sicklefin chub). The last dorsal fin ray extends beyond the first ray of the depressed fin.

Little is known about its feeding habits, although it does have teeth in its throat. The body is covered with taste buds which help it locate food. It lives in waters which are little populated by other small fish, but can be found associating with the flathead chub, sicklefin chub, and speckled chub.

Sturgeon chub exhibits little sexual dimorphism, and neither sex exhibits color changes during breeding. However, the male does develop small tubercles behind the gills during breeding. It lays eggs on gravel or clean sand to reproduce. Breeding probably occurs in June.

The habitat of the sturgeon chub is murky river bottoms in fast-flowing streams with gravel bottoms. Its habitat extends over the Missouri River and its primary tributaries, the lower Mississippi River in the states of Mississippi and Louisiana, and some streams in northeastern Wyoming. Increased silt and the construction of dams (which cause silt to settle and slow river currents) have destroyed extensive portions of its habitat. It remains common in the middle Missouri River, but rare elsewhere. The United States Fish and Wildlife Service (FWS) estimated in 2001 that it only inhabited about 59 percent of its former range.
