= Macrhybopsis =

Scientific classification
- Kingdom: Animalia
- Phylum: Chordata
- Class: Actinopterygii
- Order: Cypriniformes
- Family: Leuciscidae
- Subfamily: Pogonichthyinae
- Genus: Macrhybopsis; Cockerell & Allison, 1909

Type species
- Gobio gelidus Girard 1856

Species
- See text

Synonyms
- Extrarius Jordan, 1919

Genus of fishes

Macrhybopsis is a genus of freshwater ray-finned fishes belonging to the family Leuciscidae, the shiners, daces and minnows. The species in this genus are found in North America.

== Species ==
Macrhybopsis contains the following valid species:

- Macrhybopsis aestivalis (Girard, 1856) (speckled chub)
- Macrhybopsis australis (C. L. Hubbs & Ortenburger, 1929) (prairie chub)
- Macrhybopsis boschungi C.R. Gilbert & Mayden, 2017 (Mobile chub)
- Macrhybopsis etnieri Gilbert & Mayden, 2017 (Coosa chub)
- Macrhybopsis gelida (Girard, 1856) (sturgeon chub)
- Macrhybopsis hyostoma (C. H. Gilbert, 1884) (shoal chub)
- Macrhybopsis marconis (D. S. Jordan & C. H. Gilbert, 1886) (burrhead chub)
- Macrhybopsis meeki (D. S. Jordan & Evermann, 1896) (sicklefin chub)
- Macrhybopsis pallida C. R. Gilbert & Mayden, 2017 (pallid chub)
- Macrhybopsis storeriana (Kirtland, 1845) (silver chub)
- Macrhybopsis tetranema (C. H. Gilbert, 1886) (peppered chub, Arkansas River speckled chub)
- Macrhybopsis tomellerii C. R. Gilbert & Mayden, 2017 (Gulf chub)
