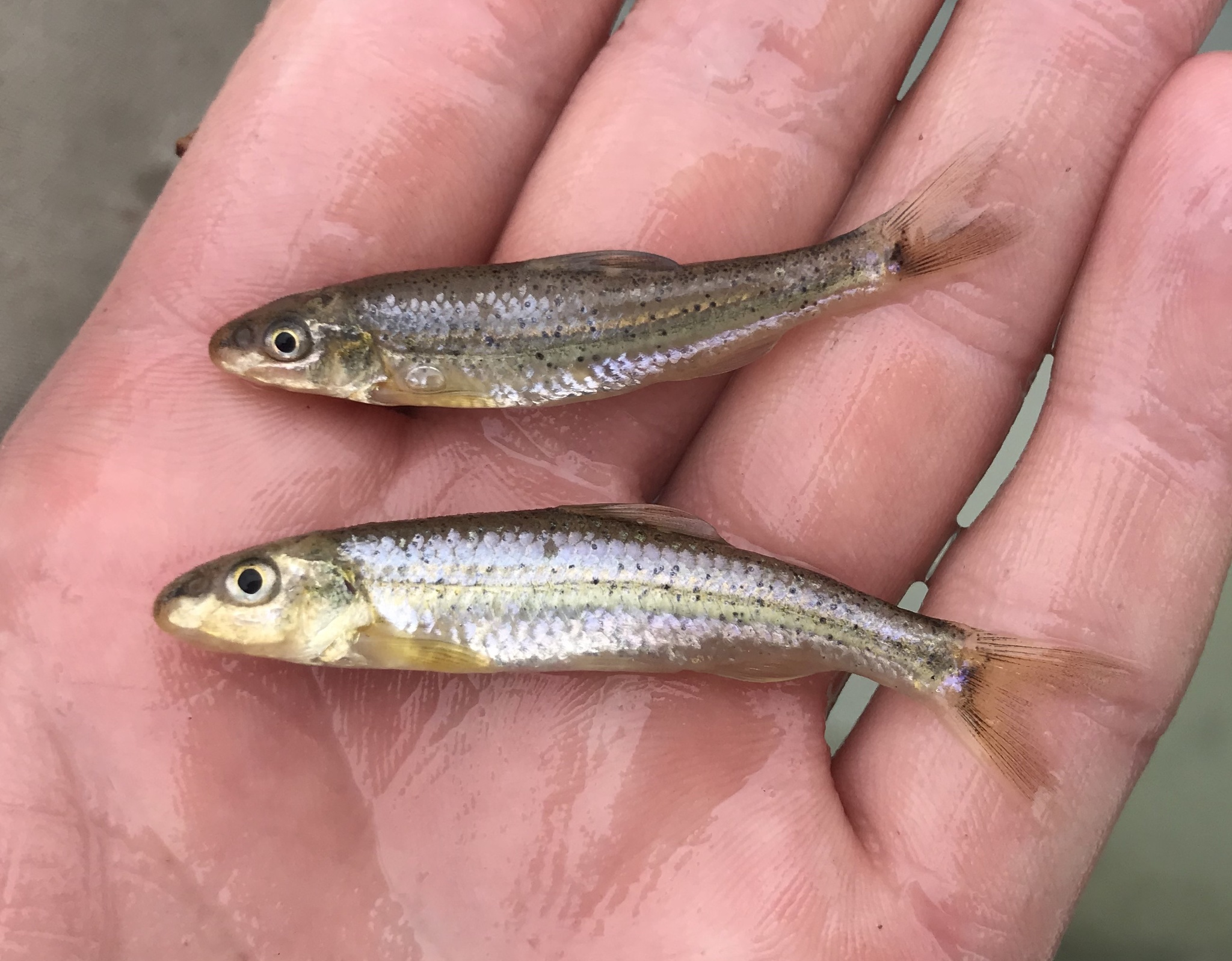

Conservation status
- Least Concern (IUCN 3.1)

- Apparently Secure (NatureServe)

Scientific classification
- Kingdom: Animalia
- Phylum: Chordata
- Class: Actinopterygii
- Order: Cypriniformes
- Family: Leuciscidae
- Genus: Macrhybopsis
- Species: M. marconis

Binomial name
- Macrhybopsis marconis (Jordan & Gilbert, 1886)

Synonyms
- Hybopsis aestivalis var. marconis, D. S. Jordan & Gilbert, 1886

= Burrhead chub =

Species of fish

The burrhead chub (Macrhybopsis marconis) is a species of freshwater ray-finned fish belonging to the family Leuciscidae, the shiners, daces and minnows. It is endemic to the Colorado, Guadalupe, and San Antonio river drainages in Texas. Its preferred habitat is sand and gravel runs of small to large rivers.

== Etymology ==
The generic name Macrhybopsis refers to macro from the Greek makrós (μaκρóς), long or large, and Hybopsis. The specific name relates to the San Marcos River, part of the Guadalupe system, which is the type locality. The common name is an allusion to the diagnostic nuptial tubercles on the heads of breeding males.
