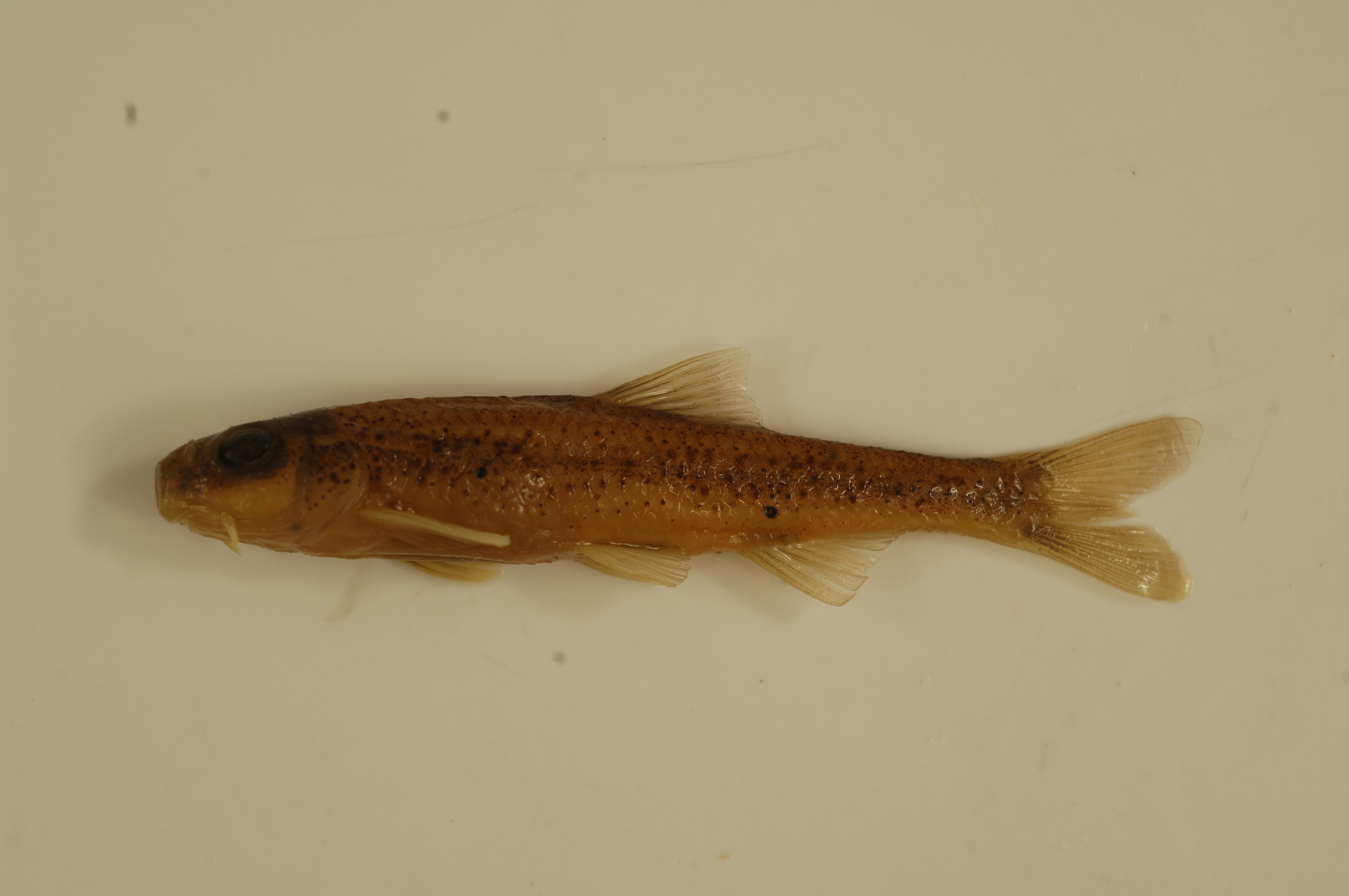

Conservation status
- Least Concern (IUCN 3.1)

Scientific classification
- Kingdom: Animalia
- Phylum: Chordata
- Class: Actinopterygii
- Order: Cypriniformes
- Family: Leuciscidae
- Genus: Macrhybopsis
- Species: M. hyostoma

Binomial name
- Macrhybopsis hyostoma (Gilbert, 1884)

Synonyms
- Nocomis hyostomus Gilbert, 1884

= Shoal chub =

Species of fish

The shoal chub (Macrhybopsis hyostoma) is a species of freshwater ray-finned fish belonging to the family Leuciscidae, the shiners, daces and minnows. It occurs in Mississippi River drainages from eastern Ohio to southern Minnesota and Nebraska south to Louisiana. Its preferred habitat is sand and gravel runs (shoals) of small to large rivers.

In their breeding condition, males develop horny nuptial tubercles on the pectoral fins, and both sexes produce a sandpaper-like texture which is present across the surface of the head and much of the body.
