= Slim minnow =

Conservation status
- Least Concern (IUCN 3.1)

Scientific classification
- Kingdom: Animalia
- Phylum: Chordata
- Class: Actinopterygii
- Order: Cypriniformes
- Family: Leuciscidae
- Subfamily: Pogonichthyinae
- Genus: Pimephales
- Species: P. tenellus

Binomial name
- Pimephales tenellus (Girard, 1856)
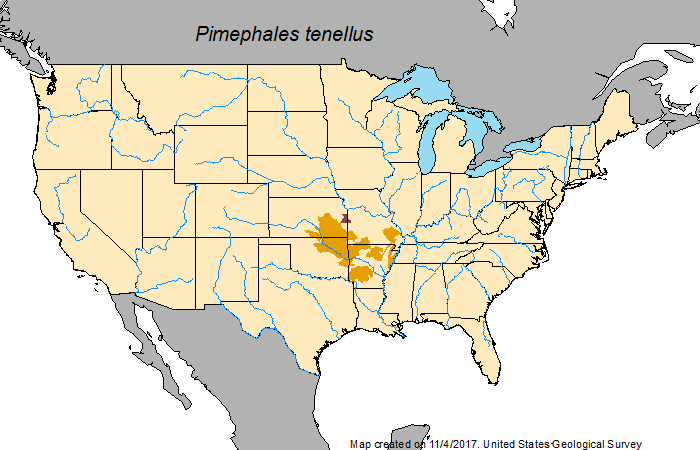
- Distribution of Pimephalus tenellus (pale native, dark introduced)

Synonyms
- Hyborhynchus tenellus Girard, 1856; Ceratichthys tenellus parviceps Hubbs & J. D. Black, 1947; Ceratichthys callarchus C. L. Hubbs & J. D. Black, 1947

Species of fish

The slim minnow (Pimephales tenellus) is a species of freshwater ray-finned fish belonging to the family Leuciscidae, the shiners, daces and minnows. This fish is endemic to the United States, in Ozarks of Arkansas, Kansas, Missouri, and Oklahoma.

== Description ==
It is a cylindrically shaped, slender fish, similar in shape to the bluntnose minnow (Pimephalus notatus), with a blunt snout and a slightly oblique mouth which has an upper lip which is much thicker in the middle than at the corners. It has a dark lateral band and a large eye which has a diameter of roughly a quarter of the length of the head. It has a dark-olive back and creamy white underparts with a well defined dark lateral band which terminates in a spot just before the caudal fin with a small dark spot often found on the front of the dorsal fin. The breeding male has three rows of 12 tubercles and the dorsal fin, anal fin and caudal fin become tinged with orange while the pectoral fins turn black with a white leading edge. the head often turns black too. It is the smallest species in the genus Pimephales with the adults normally being 51 millimetres (2.0 in) with a maximum length of 69 millimetres (2.7 in). It has 8 soft rays in the rather rounded dorsal fin and seven in the anal fin.

== Distribution ==
It is found in southern Missouri, eastern Kansas, Arkansas, and northeastern Oklahoma where they are restricted to the Ozarks, particularly in the drainage basins of the Red and Arkansas rivers as well as in some independent tributaries of Mississippi. It has also been recorded in a pond in the drainage of the Osage River in Kansas where it was probably released by an angler using the fish as bait.

== Habitat and ecology ==
The slim minnow occurs in sand-bottomed and gravel-bottomed pools and stretches of creeks and small rivers. It is a sociable species which forms schools in the middle or bottom of the water column and, unlike other Pimephalus species can often be found swimming in the current. It breeds in May–July and spawning is thought to occur in the swifter riffles. The breeding males become territorial, establishing a nest site in a suitable crevice, for example in a stone or cobble and begin to display at females. Females approached the nest and when mating they adhered the eggs to the substrate while pressed against the male which simultaneously fertilised them. The eggs eventually form a cluster adhered to the underside of the rock and the female leaves them to be guarded, cleaned and aerated by the male. The males will try to mate with any available females. The eggs hatch after 6 days and the fry drop to the bottom after hatching, paternal care stops and the fry are often preyed upon by adult fish. Females lay between 37 and 209 eggs in a season with a mean of 83.
