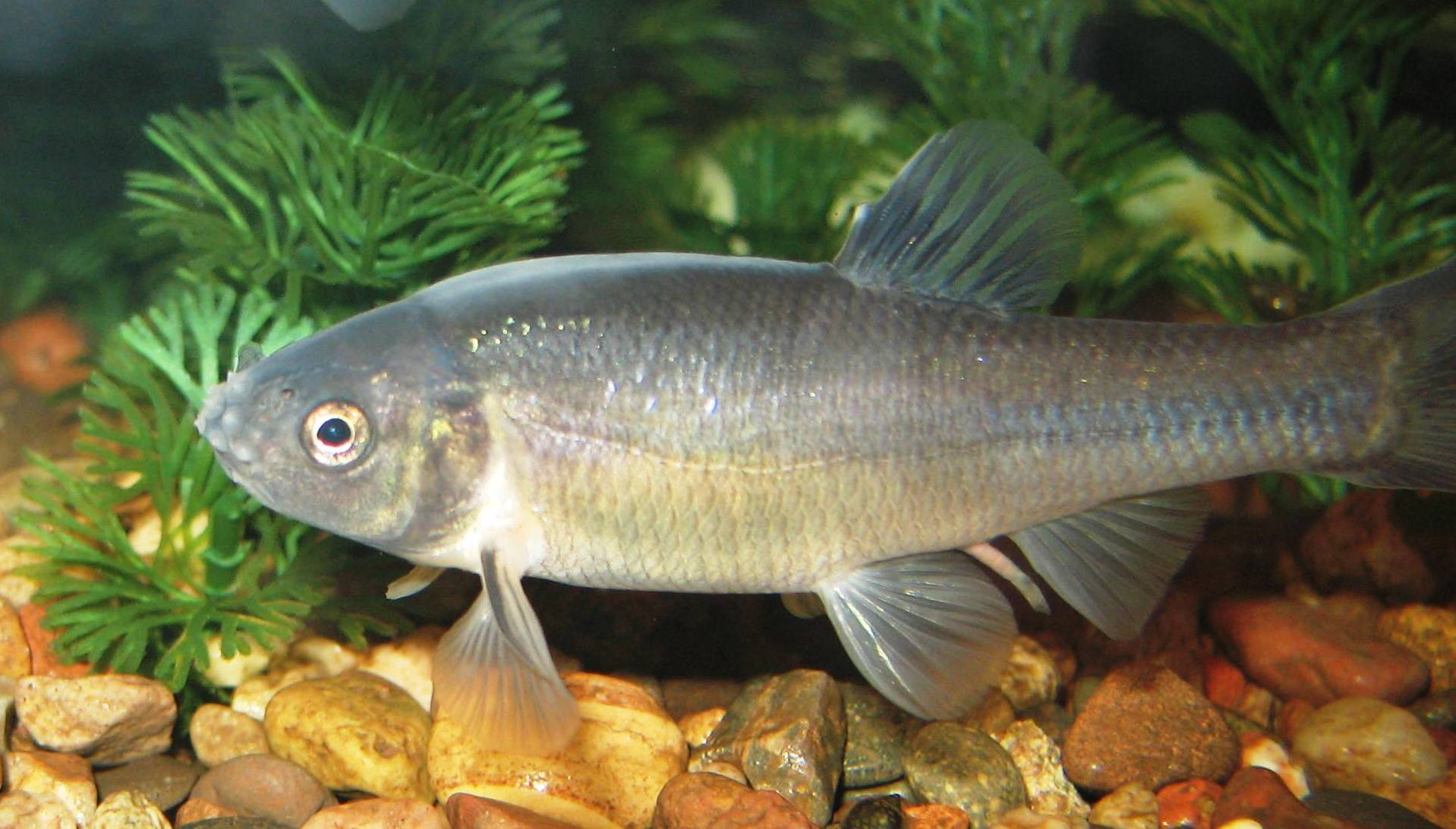
- Fathead minnow (Pimephales promelas)

Scientific classification
- Kingdom: Animalia
- Phylum: Chordata
- Class: Actinopterygii
- Order: Cypriniformes
- Family: Leuciscidae
- Subfamily: Pogonichthyinae
- Genus: Pimephales; Rafinesque, 1820

Type species
- Pimephales promelas Rafinesque, 1820

Synonyms
- Ceraticthys Baird & Girard, 1853; Cochlognathus Baird & Girard, 1854; Hyborhynchus Agassiz, 1855; Cliola Girard,1856; Coliscus Cope, 1871; Hypargyrus Forbes, 1884; Spinicephalus Lesueur, 1896

= Pimephales =

Genus of fishes

Pimephales, commonly known as the bluntnose minnows (a term used locally to refer to Pimephales notatus specifically), is a genus of freshwater ray-finned fishes belonging to the family Leuciscidae, the shiners, daces and minnows. This fishes in this genus are found in North America. All of the four species are small fish, with P. notatus being the largest at 11 cm. (about 4.3 in.) These minnows can be found all over North America and are commonly used as fish bait.

== Species ==
Pimephales contains the following species:

- Pimephales notatus (Rafinesque, 1820) (bluntnose minnow)
- Pimephales promelas Rafinesque, 1820 (fathead minnow)
- Pimephales tenellus (Girard, 1856) (slim minnow)
- Pimephales vigilax (S. F. Baird & Girard, 1853) (bullhead minnow)
