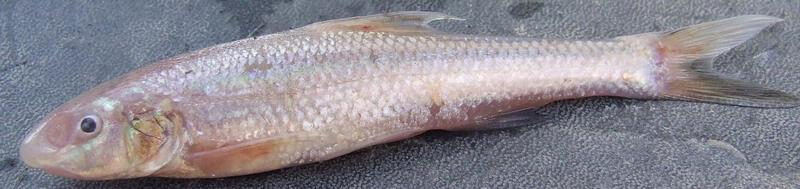

Conservation status
- Least Concern (IUCN 3.1)

Scientific classification
- Kingdom: Animalia
- Phylum: Chordata
- Class: Actinopterygii
- Order: Cypriniformes
- Family: Leuciscidae
- Genus: Macrhybopsis
- Species: M. meeki

Binomial name
- Macrhybopsis meeki (D. S. Jordan & Evermann, 1896)

Synonyms
- Hybopsis meeki D. S. Jordan & Evermann, 1896

= Sicklefin chub =

Species of fish

The sicklefin chub (Macrhybopsis meeki) is a species of freshwater ray-finned fish belonging to the family Leuciscidae, the shiners, daces and minnows. It is found only in the United States. It is one of the 324 fish species found in Tennessee, and is a species of concern in the Charles M. Russell National Wildlife Refuge in Montana.

== Names and documentation ==
The type species was collected in the Missouri River near St. Louis, Missouri, and described by David Starr Jordan and Barton Warren Evermann in 1896. They named it Hybopsis meeki. The name meeki is in honor of Seth Eugene Meek, a noted American fish biologist. In 1908, Stephen Alfred Forbes and Robert Earl Richardson suggested the binomial name Platygobio gracilis based on a specimen collected in Illinois, but this is clearly the same species described by Jordan and Evermann.

== Description and habitat ==
The sicklefin chub is a small fish which can reach 4.25 inches (10.8 cm) in adulthood. The snout is round and bulbous, and overhangs the lower jaw slightly. It is fairly round and thickest around the nape (the area just in back of the head), and the body tapers significantly until it reaches the tail. Its head is wide and deep, flat on top, with eyes set high on the head. The eyes are not as high on the head as in similar species, and are sometimes covered with a flap of skin. There is a small barbel near the corner of the mouth, and small pustules on the throat. Unlike the sturgeon chub, which it closely resembles, the sicklefin chub has no "keels" (small ridge-like protrusions on its scales). This fish has silvery sides, and is light green or brown on top. The fish often exhibits dark brown or silver specks. In larger individuals, the lower lobe of the caudal fin is often black with a white edge. This fish has large, pointed, sickle-shaped fins, which gives the minnow its name. The dorsal fin originates just over or behind where the pelvic fin originates. When depressed, the first dorsal fin extends beyond the last ray. The tip of the pelvic fin can reach beyond the origin of the pelvic fin. There are eight rays in the anal fin. The chest and belly of the fish lack scales, but not the sides or tail.

Little is known about its feeding habits, although it does have teeth in its throat. Black fly pupae and other insects have been found in the stomachs of some specimens. There is some evidence that it is a bottom feeder. The eyes are weak and it does not see well. Its body, however, is covered with taste buds which help it locate food. There are also taste buds in the mouth, which has led to speculation that the fish sorts food orally and spits out what is not edible.

Almost nothing is known about its breeding habits, but it is an egg layer. The sicklefin chub exhibits little sexual dimorphism, and neither sex exhibits color changes during breeding. However, the male develops small tubercles on the fin rays during breeding. Breeding probably occurs in the spring, and the fish is thought to be quite short-lived.

The sicklefin chub lives in fast-moving rivers with sandy or fine gravel beds, but is more commonly found on sandy beds. Its range covers the entire Missouri River; the Mississippi River from the mouth of the Missouri River down to the Ohio River; and the Mississippi River in southern Mississippi and northern Louisiana. It is fairly common in the Missouri River, but rare elsewhere. It has also been reported in the lower Kansas River.

Dams have destroyed much of the sicklefin chub's habitat by slowing currents and allowing silt to precipitate from the water and cover the sand and gravel beds the fish prefers. The United States Fish and Wildlife Service (FWS) estimated in 2001 that it only inhabited about 54 percent of its former range. In 1993, the FWS considered listing the sicklefin chub as a threatened species, but declined to do so.
