= Prairie chub =

Conservation status
- Vulnerable (IUCN 3.1)

Scientific classification
- Kingdom: Animalia
- Phylum: Chordata
- Class: Actinopterygii
- Order: Cypriniformes
- Family: Leuciscidae
- Genus: Macrhybopsis
- Species: M. australis

Binomial name
- Macrhybopsis australis (C. L. Hubbs & Ortenburger, 1929)

Synonyms
- Extrarius australis C. L. Hubbs & Ortenburger, 1929

Species of fish

The prairie chub (Macrhybopsis australis) is a species of freshwater ray-finned fish belonging to the family Leuciscidae, the shiners, daces and minnows. It occurs in the upper Red River drainage in Oklahoma and Texas. Its preferred habitat is sand and gravel runs of creeks and small to large rivers.
