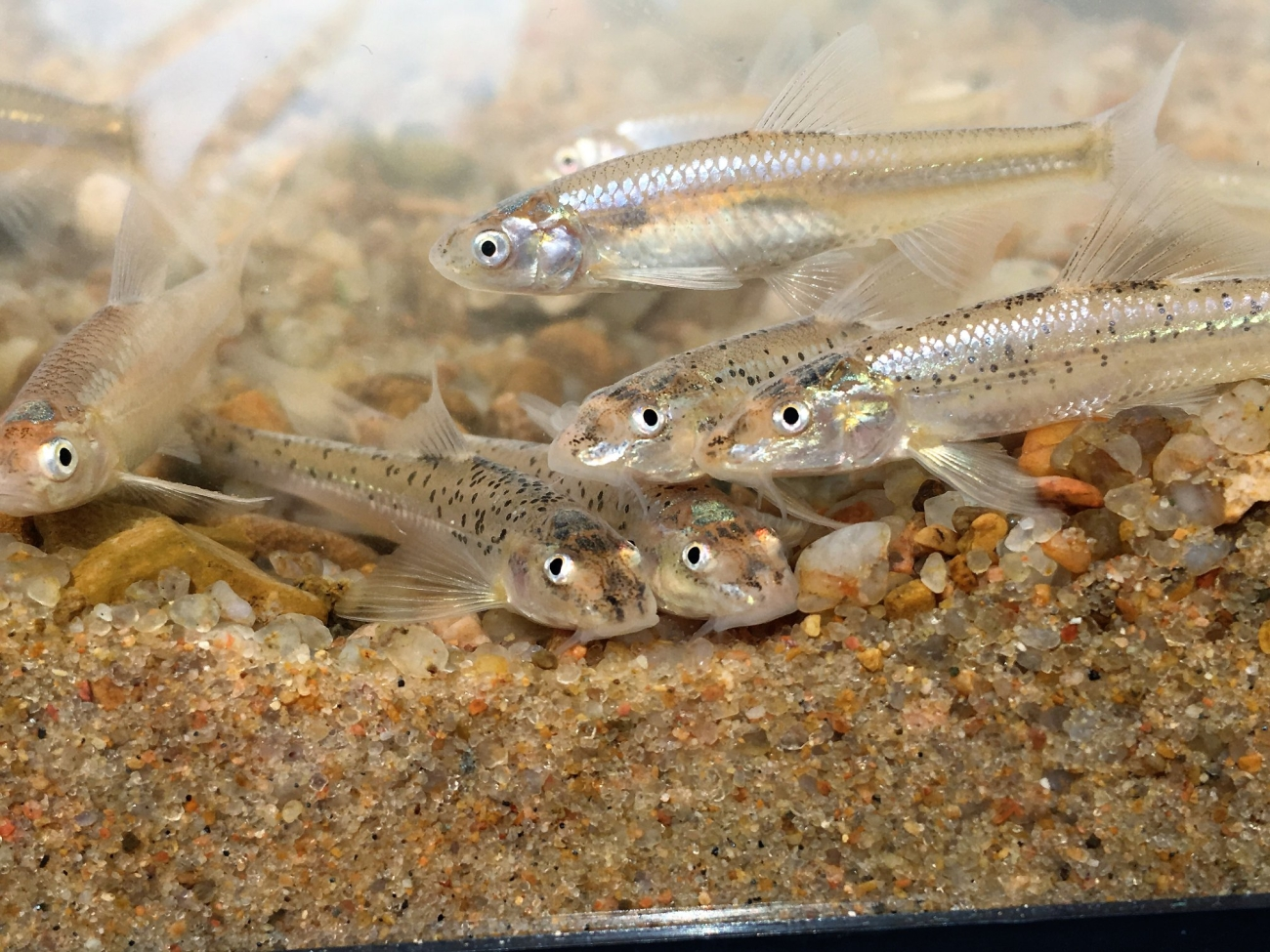

Conservation status
- Endangered (IUCN 3.1)

- Endangered (ESA)

Scientific classification
- Kingdom: Animalia
- Phylum: Chordata
- Class: Actinopterygii
- Order: Cypriniformes
- Family: Leuciscidae
- Genus: Macrhybopsis
- Species: M. tetranema

Binomial name
- Macrhybopsis tetranema (Gilbert, 1886)

Synonyms
- Hybopsis tetranemus Gilbert, 1886

= Peppered chub =

Species of ray-finned fish

The peppered chub (Macrhybopsis tetranema), also known as the Arkansas River speckled chub, is a species of freshwater ray-finned fish belonging to the family Leuciscidae, the shiners, daces and minnows. It historically occurred throughout the Arkansas River drainage, but today is found in the Ninnescah River, a small portion of the Arkansas River in Kansas and the South Canadian River between Ute and Meredith reservoirs in New Mexico and Texas. Its preferred habitat is shallow channels of large, permanently flowing, sandy streams, and prefers currents over a substrate of clean, fine sand.

== Conservation ==
The peppered chub was added to the endangered species list in 2022.
