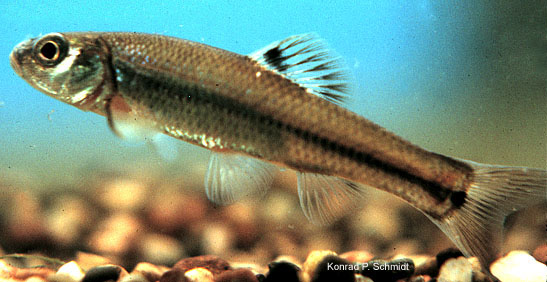

Conservation status
- Least Concern (IUCN 3.1)

Scientific classification
- Kingdom: Animalia
- Phylum: Chordata
- Class: Actinopterygii
- Order: Cypriniformes
- Family: Leuciscidae
- Subfamily: Pogonichthyinae
- Genus: Pimephales
- Species: P. vigilax

Binomial name
- Pimephales vigilax (S. F. Baird & Girard, 1853)
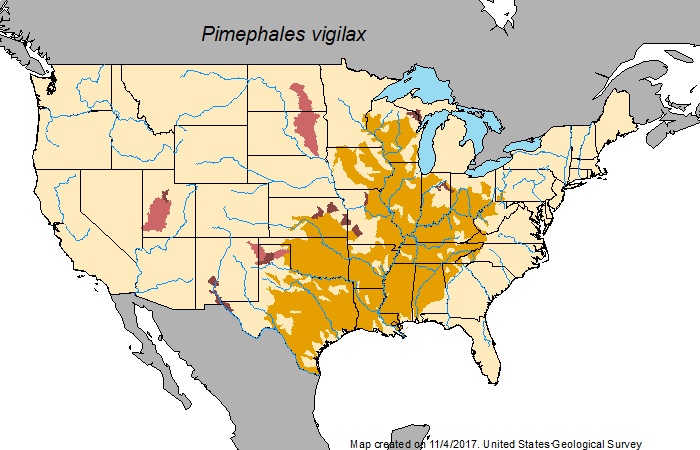
- Distribution of bullhead minnow in the United States, orange is indigenous range and red is non-indigenous range

Synonyms
- Ceraticthys vigilax S. F. Baird & Girard, 1853; Cochlognathus ornatus S. F. Baird & Girard, 1854; Hyborhynchus perspicuus Girard, 1856; Cliola velox Girard, 1856; Cochlognathus biguttata Cope, 1880; Alburnops taurocephalus O. P. Hay, 1881

= Bullhead minnow =

Species of fish

The bullhead minnow (Pimephales vigilax) is a species of freshwater ray-finned fish belonging to the family Leuciscidae, the shiners, daces and minnows. This demersal fish is native to the Mississippi River system in the United States, to tributaries of Lake Huron and Lake Michigan and to northern Mexico.

== History ==
The bullhead minnow was first described by Spencer Baird and Charles Girard in 1853.

== Characteristics ==
The bullhead minnow is cylindrical and small in size, with an average length of 5.7 centimetres (2.2 in) and a maximum length of 9.2 centimetres (3.6 in). The males of the species are dark in color, brown, olive, or tan, with two light colored vertical lines down their side, while the females are plain in comparison. The snout is rounded. There are eight total pharyngeal teeth distributed equally bilaterally. There is a dark spot present on the anterior dorsal fin. The tail is forked with rounded ends, with a dark spot present at the fin's base at the level of the lateral line. The single dorsal fin contains eight rays, with a dark spot present anteriorly and no spine. The anal fin contains seven rays with no spine, pelvic fins are abdominal and no adipose fin is present. The pectoral fins have a dark leading edge. The lateral line dips anteriorly.

== Distribution ==
The bullhead minnow is mainly located in the southern United States, in the Gulf Coast of the United States and Mississippi River Basin. It can be found in the basin of the Mobile River, as well as connected backwaters, streams and rivers. They are found more often in waters that typically have little to no movement, such as in river pools. It is one of the 324 fish species found in Tennessee. They have been introduced to the Osage River and Kansas River systems in Kansas, to the Missouri in Nebraska, the Rio Grande in New Mexico, Lake St Marys in Ohio, the James drainage in South Dakota, the Red River, Canadian River and Rio Grande in Texas and to the upper Fox River and possibly the Menomonee River in Wisconsin. They were probably introduced to these areas as bait fish carried by anglers. It has also been introduced to Utah where it occurs in two closed drainages within the Great Basin, that of the Sevier River, where it seems to have been introduced accidentally in releases of channel catfish (Ictalurus punctatus) imported from Texas in the 1950s, and of Lake Utah.

== Biology ==
The spawning season extends from the middle of May through early September. They reproduce in an egg-clustering fashion. For a mating location, the males build a nest, normally protected by rocks, tree roots or limbs, or boards, The female lays eggs on the underside of the nest's structural associate, and the male guards and oxygenates the eggs throughout spawning. The male may also clean the eggs using its special dorsal spongy pad. There is currently no known age of maturation for this fish. They live an average of three to five years. They are a bottom-living species, and feed on organisms found in the mud covering the ground.
