= Silver chub =

Conservation status
- Least Concern (IUCN 3.1)

Scientific classification
- Kingdom: Animalia
- Phylum: Chordata
- Class: Actinopterygii
- Order: Cypriniformes
- Family: Leuciscidae
- Subfamily: Pogonichthyinae
- Genus: Macrhybopsis
- Species: M. storeriana

Binomial name
- Macrhybopsis storeriana (J. P. Kirtland, 1845)

Synonyms
- Leuciscus storerianus Kirtland, 1845; Hybopsis storeriana (Kirtland, 1845); Gobio vernalis Girard, 1856; Ceratichthys lucens D. S. Jordan, 1880

Species of fish

The silver chub (Macrhybopsis storeriana) is a species of freshwater ray-finned fish belonging to the family Leuciscidae, the shiners, daces and minnows. This species is found in North America.

== Description ==
The maximum size of a silver chub is 231 mm (9.1 in) in total length. It is pale grey-green dorsally, becoming silvery on its sides and silvery white on its belly. The iris of its eye is white-yellow. A faint dusky lateral stripe is usually present. The caudal fin is lightly pigmented, except the lower 3–4 rays, which are completely unpigmented. Silver chubs have a body shape that is slender, moderately compressed, and flattened ventrally. Their mouths are inferior and horizontal. They have a maxillary barbel, the premaxilla is protractile, and the upper lip is separated from the skin of the snout by a deep groove that is continuous along the midline. The lateral line is either straight or has a broad arch. Adult males have large, uniserial tubercles on the dorsal surface of pectoral fins rays 2–10. The head of a silver chub bears minute sensory buds, but not breeding tubercles.

== Diet ==
Silver chubs are planktivores/invertivores. During the first year, they consume small crustaceans and midge larvae and pupae. The adults eat mayfly larvae, small mollusks, and crustaceans.

== Habitat ==
Silver chubs are mainly restricted to large, often silty rivers; they are sometimes found near the mouths of small streams.

== Reproduction and Life Cycle ==
The spawning season for silver chubs has been recorded to be in late spring or early summer in Iowa, and June and July in Wisconsin In western Lake Erie, spawning began the second week of June in water temperature of 19 °C (66 °F), reached its peak during the last week of June and first week of July with water temperature at 23 °C (73 °F), and was completed by the middle of August. Kinney (1954) concluded that the species spawns at relatively high temperatures. Silver chubs are rock and gravel spawners with pelagic free embryos. Life longevity for male silver chubs is three years and for females is four years. Kinney (1954) found most 1-year old fish to be sexually mature. During development, the average silver chub is 124 mm (4.9 in) in standard length after the first year, 147 mm (5.8 in) in standard length after the second year, and 164 mm (6.5 in) in standard length after the third year.

== Distribution ==
United States distribution: Widespread from southern New York to the Red River drainages. Texas distribution: The silver chub is in the Red River and the lower Brazos River; the Brazos River population is apparently disjunct from other populations of this species, which range through the Mississippi River basin to Mobil Bay.

== Importance to Humans ==
The silver chub is regarded as excellent forage and bait fish for largemouth and smallmouth black bass.

== Etymology ==
Macrhybopsisis Greek "long rounded face" and storeriana named for David H. Storer (1804–1891), an early student of North American fishes.
