= Stippled darter =

Conservation status
- Least Concern (IUCN 3.1)

Scientific classification
- Kingdom: Animalia
- Phylum: Chordata
- Class: Actinopterygii
- Order: Perciformes
- Family: Percidae
- Genus: Etheostoma
- Species: E. punctulatum

Binomial name
- Etheostoma punctulatum (Agassiz, 1854)

Synonyms
- Poecilichthys punctulatus Agassiz, 1854

Species of fish

The stippled darter (Etheostoma punctulatum) is a species of freshwater ray-finned fish, a darter from the subfamily Etheostomatinae, part of the family Percidae, which also contains the perches, ruffes and pikeperches. It is found in Missouri and White River drainages in Ozark Uplands of Missouri and Arkansas. Isolated population occurs in upper Castor River of southeastern Missouri. It inhabits rocky pools of headwaters and creeks. This species can reach a length of 10.0 cm (3.9 in).
