= Species of concern =

Species about which there are some concerns regarding status and threats

In wildlife conservation in the United States, species of concern are species about which there are some concerns regarding status and threats, but insufficient information is available to list the species under the Endangered Species Act (ESA). Species of concern are commonly declining or appear to be in need of concentrated conservation actions. Many agencies and organizations maintain lists of these at-risk species.
