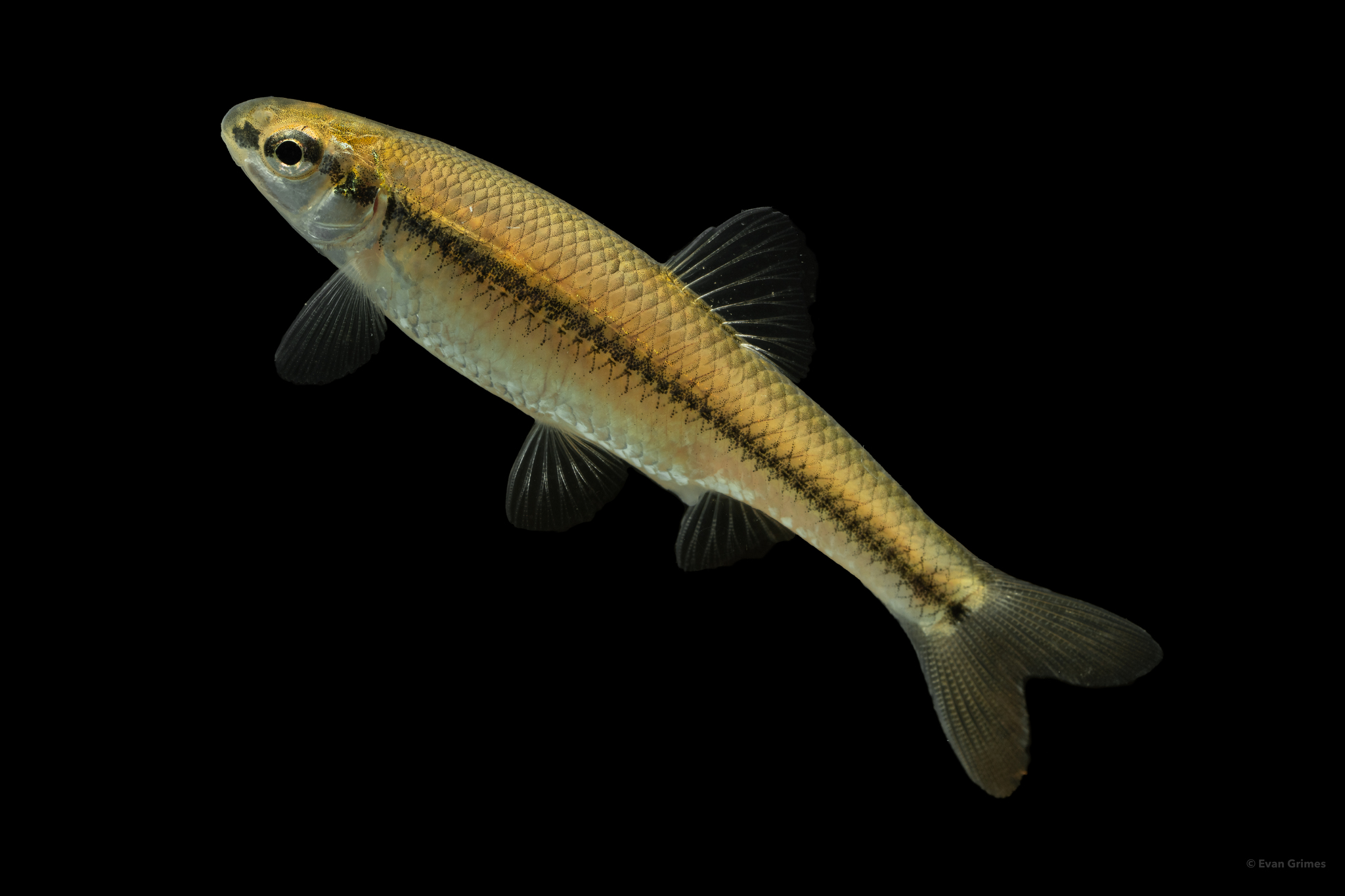

Conservation status
- Least Concern (IUCN 3.1)

Scientific classification
- Kingdom: Animalia
- Phylum: Chordata
- Class: Actinopterygii
- Order: Cypriniformes
- Family: Leuciscidae
- Subfamily: Pogonichthyinae
- Genus: Pimephales
- Species: P. notatus

Binomial name
- Pimephales notatus (Rafinesque, 1820)

Synonyms
- Minnilus notatus Rafinesque, 1820; Hybopsis haematurus Cope, 1867; Hybopsis tudetanus Cope, 1867; Hyborhynchus superciliosus Cope, 1868; Spinicephalus fibulatus Lesueur, 1896

= Bluntnose minnow =

Species of fish

"Bluntnose minnows" is also used for the genus Pimephales as a whole.

The bluntnose minnow (Pimephales notatus) is a species of freshwater ray-finned fish belonging to the family Leuciscidae, the shiners, daces and minnows. Its natural geographic range extends from the Great Lakes south along the Mississippi River basin to Louisiana, and east across the Midwestern United States to New York State. The bluntnose is very ubiquitous, and may be the most common freshwater fish in the Eastern U.S.

== Description ==
Bluntnose minnows are commonly 6.5 cm (2.6 in) long, with a maximum length of 11 cm (4.3 in). On the first two or three dorsal rays are dark pigmented spots. The scales between the head and the dorsal fin are noted to be smaller than the rest of the scales on the body. They have a rounded head and a terminal mouth, although the snout hangs a little bit over the mouth. The dark coloring on the edges of the scales cause a cross-hatched look along the body. The scales on these fish are cycloid scales, a type of leptoid scale. It is possible to find the age of a fish from the rings on the scales. The lateral line of a bluntnose minnow runs from its head to tail, ending in a black spot that makes them distinguishable from the fathead minnow. These minnows have a pale olive upper body (above the lateral line) and a silvery lower body (below the lateral line), with silvery-blue scales near the lateral line.

== Distribution ==
The bluntnose minnow can be found in North America, in the Hudson Bay and Mississippi River basins from southern Quebec to southern Manitoba, Canada to Louisiana, United States. They are also found from the Saint Lawrence River in Quebec to the Roanoke River on the east coast of United States. There are also many non-indigenous populations found in Connecticut, Georgia, Maryland, Massachusetts, New York, Ohio, South Dakota, Utah, Virginia, West Virginia, and Michigan, thought to have been introduced by bait bucket release or stock contamination. Bluntnose minnows are thought to be the most abundant freshwater fish in the eastern part of the country.

== Habitat ==
Bluntnose minnows can be found in lakes, rivers, ponds and streams, showing a preference for shallow, clear water with a sandy bottom. Their habitats range from headwater bogs, swamps, and springs to rivers, ponds, and lakes. Sometimes, up to a dozen species of minnows can be found in a single stream of moderate size. They can be found swimming in large groups or alone.

== Diet ==
These fish prefer to feed on aquatic insects, algae, diatoms, aquatic insect larvae, and small crustaceans called entomostracans. Occasionally they will eat fish eggs or small fish.

== Life cycle ==
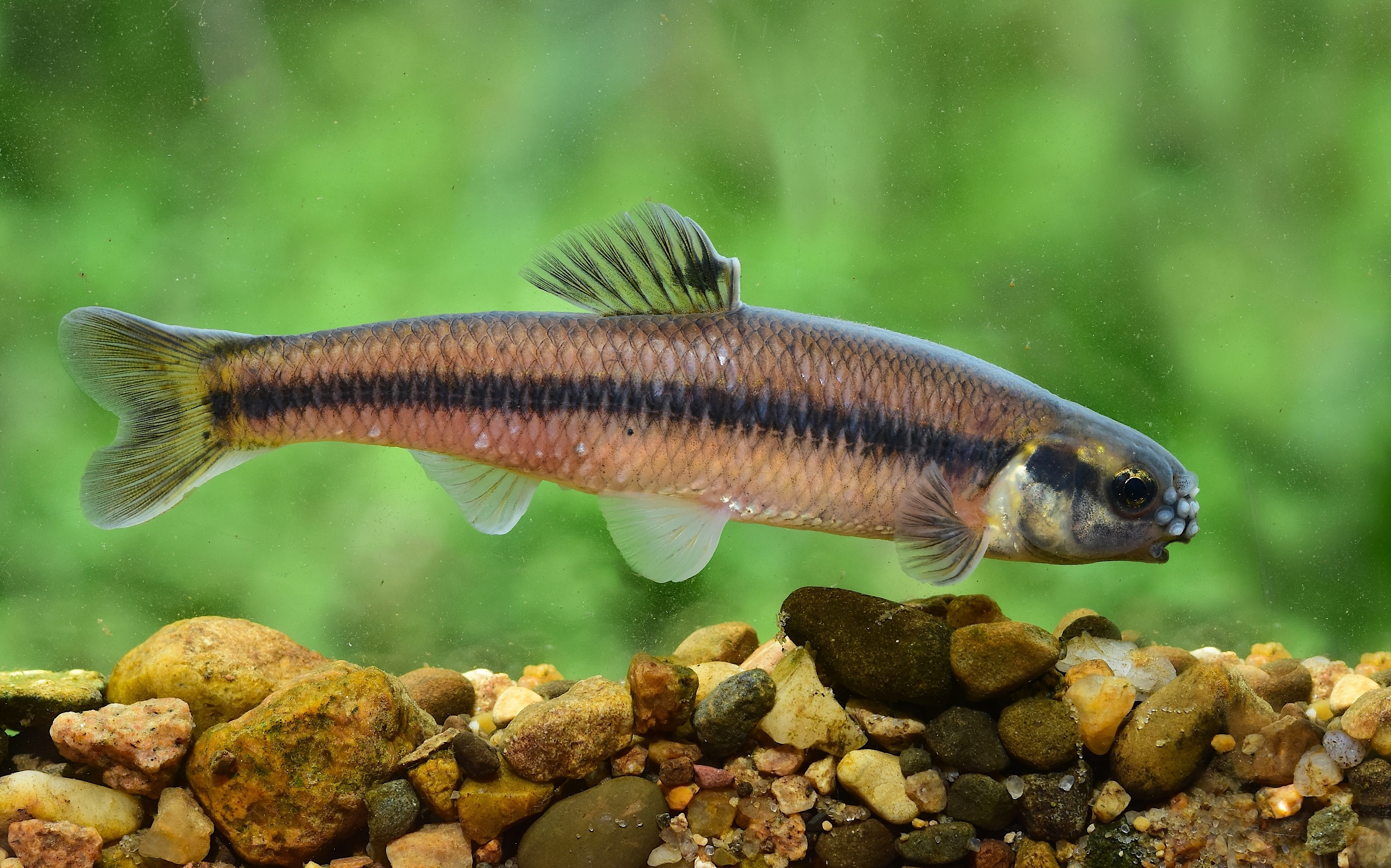
Bluntnose Minnow in spawning colors

Bluntnose minnows spawn from early spring to midsummer, depending on their habitat. They attach their eggs under stones in depressions they have dug. During the mating season, the heads of the males will become darker and their bodies bluish. They also develop three rows of nuptial tubercles (bumps) on their heads. Eggs hatch in eight to fourteen days.

== Etymology ==
The genus name Pimephales means fat head, the specific epithet notatus means marked or spotted.
