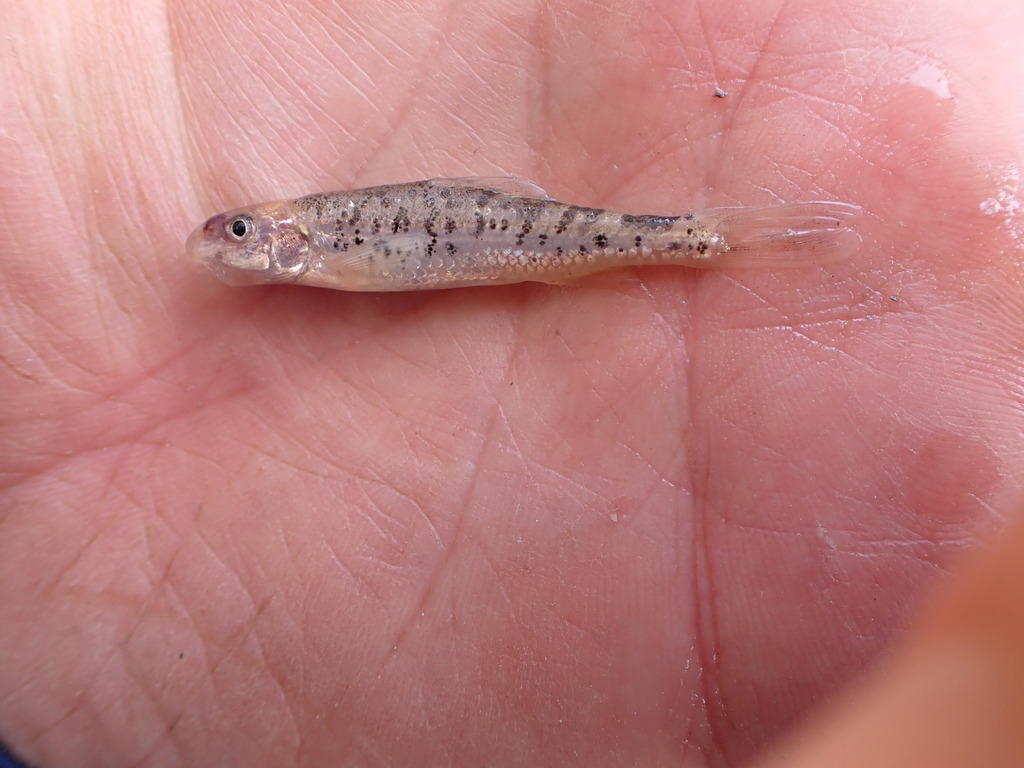

Conservation status
- Least Concern (IUCN 3.1)

- Vulnerable (NatureServe)

Scientific classification
- Kingdom: Animalia
- Phylum: Chordata
- Class: Actinopterygii
- Order: Cypriniformes
- Family: Leuciscidae
- Subfamily: Pogonichthyinae
- Genus: Macrhybopsis
- Species: M. aestivalis

Binomial name
- Macrhybopsis aestivalis (Girard, 1856)

Synonyms
- Gobio aestivalis Girard, 1856; Hybopsis aestivalis (Girard 1856); Extrarius aestivalis (Girard 1856); Ceratichthys sterletus Cope, 1875

= Speckled chub =

Species of fish

The speckled chub (Macrhybopsis aestivalis) is a species of freshwater ray-finned fish belonging to the family Leuciscidae, the shiners, daces and minnows. This species is found in North America, occurring in the United States and Mexico

== Description ==
Speckled chubs have a slender, compressed body that is usually a yellowish tan to silver in color and may or may not have dark markings present. The underside of the fish is mainly silver. The eyes are situated high on the head, and the lateral line consists of 34–41 scales, which can appear either straight or arched. The dorsal fin soft rays have faintly dark edges. The mouth is horizontal and inferior, and it has long barbels present at the corners of the mouth. It has a rounded snout with moderately fleshy lips. The lateral line is either straight or arched along the length of the body. The speckled chub has less than 10 dorsal fin soft rays, 16–21 caudal fin soft rays, 7–9 anal fin soft rays, 6–9 pelvic fin soft rays, and 11–18 pectoral fin soft rays. The speckled chub has pharyngeal teeth. The maximum body size is recorded at 7.6 cm (3.0 in), and the average length is 6.1 cm (2.4 in). Speckled chubs rarely live longer than a year and a half.

== Distribution and habitat ==
The speckled chub is native to North America and is mainly found in the United States and Mexico. It is found in the Gulf Slope drainages from the Apalachicola basin to the Rio Grande basin and north to Minnesota. It appears to be restricted to large, flowing river channels, where they are found on the bottom with moderate to swift currents and sandy or gravelly bottoms.

== Feeding ==
Speckled chubs use the taste buds located on the head, body, and fins to find the aquatic insects they feed on. Generally, they feed on aquatic insect larvae, with a large portion of their diet including the larvae of midges.

== Reproduction ==
Spawning occurs around midday from late April to August, with large aggregations occurring in the lower Pearl River in Mississippi during March and April, and also in the main channels of the Cahaba and Tallapoosa Rivers during May and June. These fish have external fertilization. Mating is initiated when males pursue a female and nudge her abdomen. When the female is ready to spawn, the male wraps himself around her and the eggs and sperm are released at the same time. This mating behavior is usually repeated with several spawning episodes, generally with at least ten minutes between fertilizations. The speckled chub does not guard its eggs from potential predators.

== Conservation status ==
The speckled chub is considered a threatened species in Mexico, however they are quite common in the mainstream Rio Grande. The speckled chub population has declined in the lower Rio Grande due to reservoirs, channelization, and reduced stream flows associated with irrigation.

== Etymology of name ==
The speckled chub is given its name due to the black spots seen on the body. The "macr-" part of its name is a Greek root, meaning "long," which is most likely referring to the long and slender bodies of the genus Macrhybopsis minnows. the "aestivalis" part of the name is translated to pertain to summer, which is referring to the long spawning season of the speckled chub.
