= CNFC =

CNFC may refer to:

- Chamois Niortais F.C.
- Conseil national des femmes du Canada
- China National Fisheries Corporation
