= Fishing industry in China =

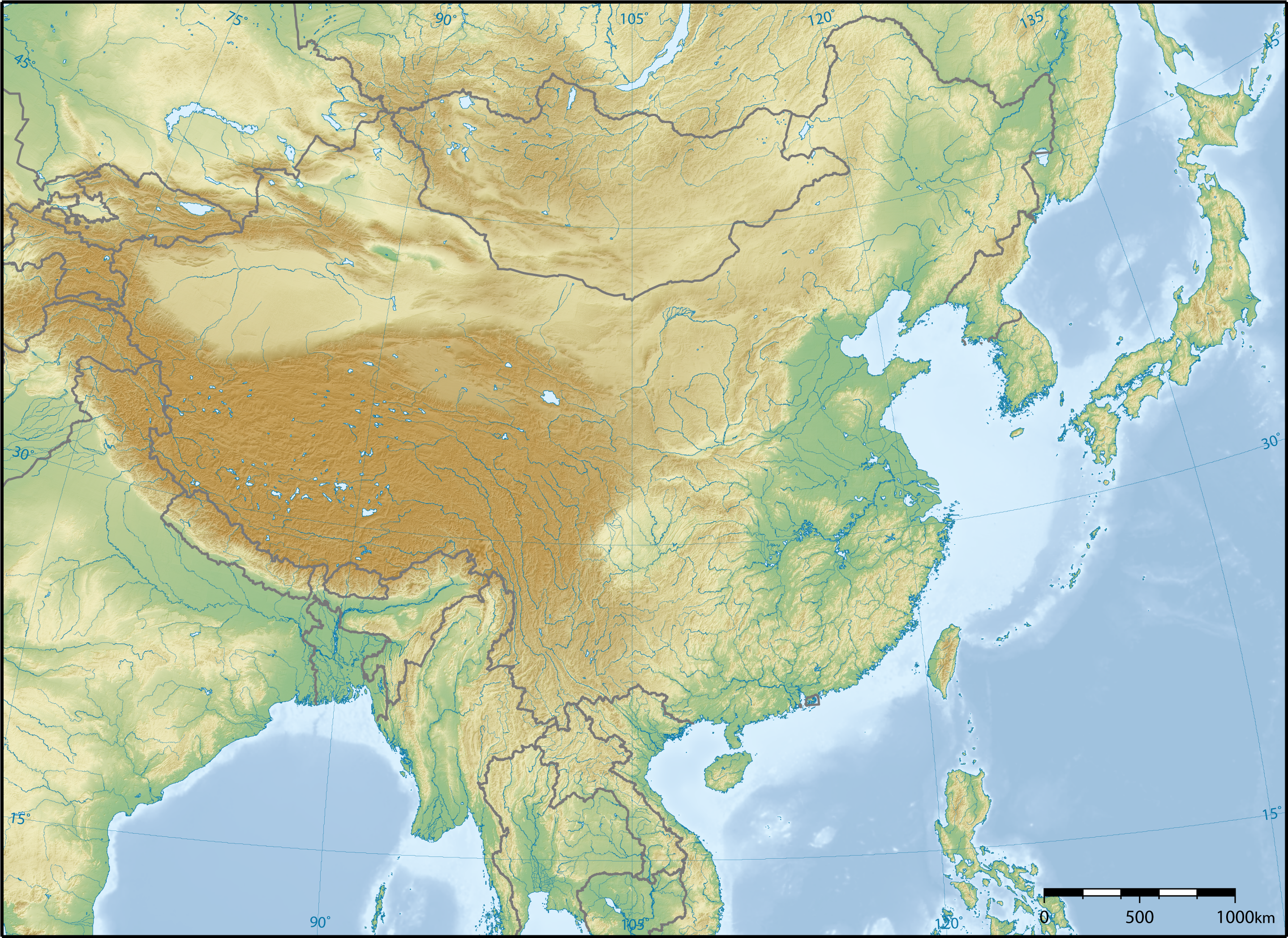
- China's continental shelf covers 431,000 km^{2} (166,000 sq mi)

General characteristics (2004 unless otherwise stated)
- Coastline: 14,500 km (9,000 mi)
- EEZ area: 877,019 km^{2} (338,619 sq mi)
- Lake area: 196,000 km^{2} (76,000 sq mi) (incl reservoirs)
- River area: 74,550 km^{2} (28,780 sq mi)
- Land area: 9,326,410 km^{2} (3,600,950 sq mi)
- Employment: 7.9 million persons (2004)
- Fishing fleet: 220,000 motorised vessels 25,600 vessels greater than 100 gt (2002); Total fleet power 12.7 million kilowatts (17.0×10^{6} hp)
- Consumption: 25.8 kg (57 lb) fish per capita (2003)
- Fisheries GDP: US$ 45.9 billion (2004)
- Export value: US$ 6.6 billion (2004)
- Import value: US$ 3.1 billion (2004)

Harvest (2004 unless otherwise stated)
- Wild marine: 14.5 million tonnes (16,000,000 tons)
- Wild inland marine: 2.4 million tonnes (2,600,000 tons)
- Wild total: 19.9 million tonnes (21,900,000 tons)
- Aquaculture total: 32.4 million tonnes (35,700,000 tons) (2005)
- Fish total: 49.5 million tonnes (54,600,000 tons) (2005)

China has one-fifth of the world's population and accounts for one-third of the world's reported fish production as well as two-thirds of the world's reported aquaculture production. It is a major importer of seafood; the country's seafood market is estimated to reach US$53.5 billion by 2027.

China's 2005 reported catch of wild fish, caught in rivers, lakes, and the sea, was 17.1 million tonnes, far ahead of the second-ranked nation, the United States, which reported 4.9 million tonnes. The Chinese commercial fishing fleet is responsible for more illegal, unreported and unregulated fishing than that of any other nation.

Aquaculture, the farming of fish in ponds, lakes and tanks, accounts for two-thirds of China's reported output. China's 2005 reported harvest was 32.4 million tonnes, more than 10 times that of the second-ranked nation, India, which reported 2.8 million tonnes. The country's aquaculture market is forecast to reach US$177.3 Billion by 2027.

The major aquaculture-producers are concentrated in coastal regions. China is increasingly developing offshore fish farms and has large scale salmon farms in the Yellow Sea.

About 80 percent of seafood consumed in the U.S. is caught or processed abroad, with China as its biggest supplier.

== Statistics ==
Since 2002, China has been the world largest exporter of fish and fish products. In 2005, exports, including aquatic plants, were valued at US$7.7 billion, with Japan, the United States and the Republic of Korea as the main markets. In 2005, China was the sixth largest importer of fish and fish products in the world, with imports totaling US$4.0 billion.

In 2003, the global per capita consumption of fish was estimated at 16.5 kg, with Chinese consumption, based on her reported returns, at 25.8 kg.

In 2010, China accounted for 60% of global aquaculture production (by volume) and had ~14 million people (26% of the world total) engaged as fishers and fish farmers (FAO). In 2009, China produced approximately 21 million metric tons (MTs) of freshwater fish or 48% of global output, and 5.3 million MTs of crustaceans or 49% of global output.

The Chinese fishing industry is the most heavily subsidized on earth. It also has the highest share of harmful subsidies, subsidies which make it profitable to overfish depleted stocks, with $5.9 billion of such subsidies paid in 2018. This compares to harmful subsidies from Japan at $2.1 billion, the European Union at $2 billion, and the United States at $1.1 billion. Most of these subsidies are fuel subsidies, which contribute to carbon emissions. In 2013 94% of Chinese fisheries subsidies were for fuel.

As of 2020 China had the world's largest distant waters fishing fleet with nearly 17,000 vessels, mostly registered in China but with approximately 1,000 registered under flags of convenience. In 2025 China’s global fishing fleet was estimated to include 57,000 industrial vessels. It represented 44% of the world’s visible fishing activity. Chinese vessels accounted for 30% of all fishing activity on the high seas, appearing to fish for more than 8.3 million hours.

== History ==
China inland fish production before 1963 came mainly from wild inland fisheries. Since then, wild inland fishery resources have decreased because of overfishing, dam building, land reclamation for agriculture, and industrial pollution. During the 1970s, the annual output of wild inland fisheries dropped to 300,000 tonnes per year. In 1978, the government set up organizational structures to deal with these issues, and to stock fish fingerlings in rivers, lakes and reservoirs. This reversed many of the problems, and by 1996 production reached 1.76 million tonnes. However, inland aquaculture has made even bigger gains, and now outstrips production from the wild inland fisheries.

In 1999, China set an objective of "zero growth" in coastal marine capture catch, and in 2001 changed the objective to "minus growth [sic]". To achieve this, China has been reducing vessel numbers and relocating fishermen away from marine capture fisheries. By the end of 2004, 8,000 vessels were scrapped and 40,000 fishermen were relocated. In 2006, China issued the Programme of Action on Conservation of Living Aquatic Resources of China. This provides that, by 2010, deterioration of the aquatic environment, declines in fisheries resources and increases in endangered species will be arrested, over-capacity will be reduced, and efficiencies will be increased.

In 2017 the Ecuadorian Navy seized the reefer vessel Fu Yuan Yu Leng 999 inside the Galapagos Marine Reserve with over 6,000 frozen sharks including whale sharks. The Fu Yuan Yu Leng 999 vessel was responsible for harbouring nearly 572 tonnes of fish; 12 different species identified, 11 of those being prominent in the Galapagos Marine Reserve and 9 of the species being on the International Union for Conservation of Nature Red List (ICUN list). The crew were tried and convicted of illegal fishing with each sentenced to four years in prison and the vessel's owner was fined six million dollars.

Chinese distant water fishing activities started in 1985 when China gained access to new fishing grounds through agreements with foreign countries. By 1996, these fisheries had extended to 60 regions around the world, employing 21,200 fishermen, 1381 fishing vessels, and caught 926,500 tonnes.

Construction of the world's first 100,000-ton large-scale fish farming vessel, the Guoxin-1, was completed in 2022. In 2025, Guoxin Development Group unveiled a 150,000 ton version, with greater automation.

China sent the first Chinese fishing fleet to West African waters in 1985. The following year, with other Chinese partners, CNFC started trawling operations in the North Pacific. Tuna longlining followed in the South Pacific, and in 1989, squid longlining in the Japan Sea and the North Pacific. According to the South Pacific Regional Fisheries Management Organization Chinese participation in South Pacific fisheries increased from 54 vessels catching 70,000 tons in 2009 to 557 vessels and 358,000 tons of catch in 2020.

Oceana's analysis in partnership with Global Fishing Watch noted that in September 2020, 300 Chinese merchant vessels were spotted off the coast of the Galapagos fishing squid, tuna, sharks, and other marine life. Satellite data analysis found that various fishing vessels spent a cumulative 73,000 hours fishing near the Galapagos Islands between August and September 2020. Oceana concluded that this fishing negatively affected sensitive marine life in the region and that Chinese vessels actively sought to evade detection by local authorities, either by practicing illegal transshipment strategies or by disabling onboard public tracking devices.

In 2020 a fleet of Chinese fishing boats attacked Taiwanese Coast Guard Administration and local environmental protection vessels which had been clearing illegal nets in Taiwanese waters.

On December 15, 2020, the Palaun patrol vessel PSS Remeliik II detained a Chinese fishing vessel which had on board an unlicensed catch of 225 kilograms (496 lb) of sea cucumbers, worth $800 per kilogram, in Asian markets. Earlier that fall, the Remeliik detained six smaller Chinese vessels.

In December 2022, the United States Secretary of the Treasury issued sanctions on Pingtan Marine Enterprise and related individuals over human rights abuses tied to China-based illegal fishing.

== Wild fisheries ==
=== Coastal fisheries ===
China has a coastline of 14,500 km.

China's coastline runs 14,500 kilometers, and an exclusive economic zone (EEZ) of 877,019 square kilometers. The fishing grounds range from sub-tropical to temperate zones and include 431,000 square kilometers of continental shelves (200 meters or less deep).

Marine fishing grounds in km²
| Region | Area | Continental shelf | EEZ |
| Bohai Sea | 24,000 | 24,000 | 24,000 |
| Yellow Sea | 127,000 | 127,000 | 103,000 |
| East China Sea | 252,000 | 151,000 | 160,000 |
| South China Sea | 630,000 | 129,000 | 531,000 |
| Total | 1,033,000 | 431,000 | 818,000 |

Disputes continue with several neighboring nations over the exact extent of China's EEZ in the South China Sea.

The seas around China host about 3,000 marine species, of which more than 150 are fished commercially. Major marine fish species include chub mackerel, black scraper, anchovy and shrimps, crabs and smaller fishes.

=== Distant fisheries ===
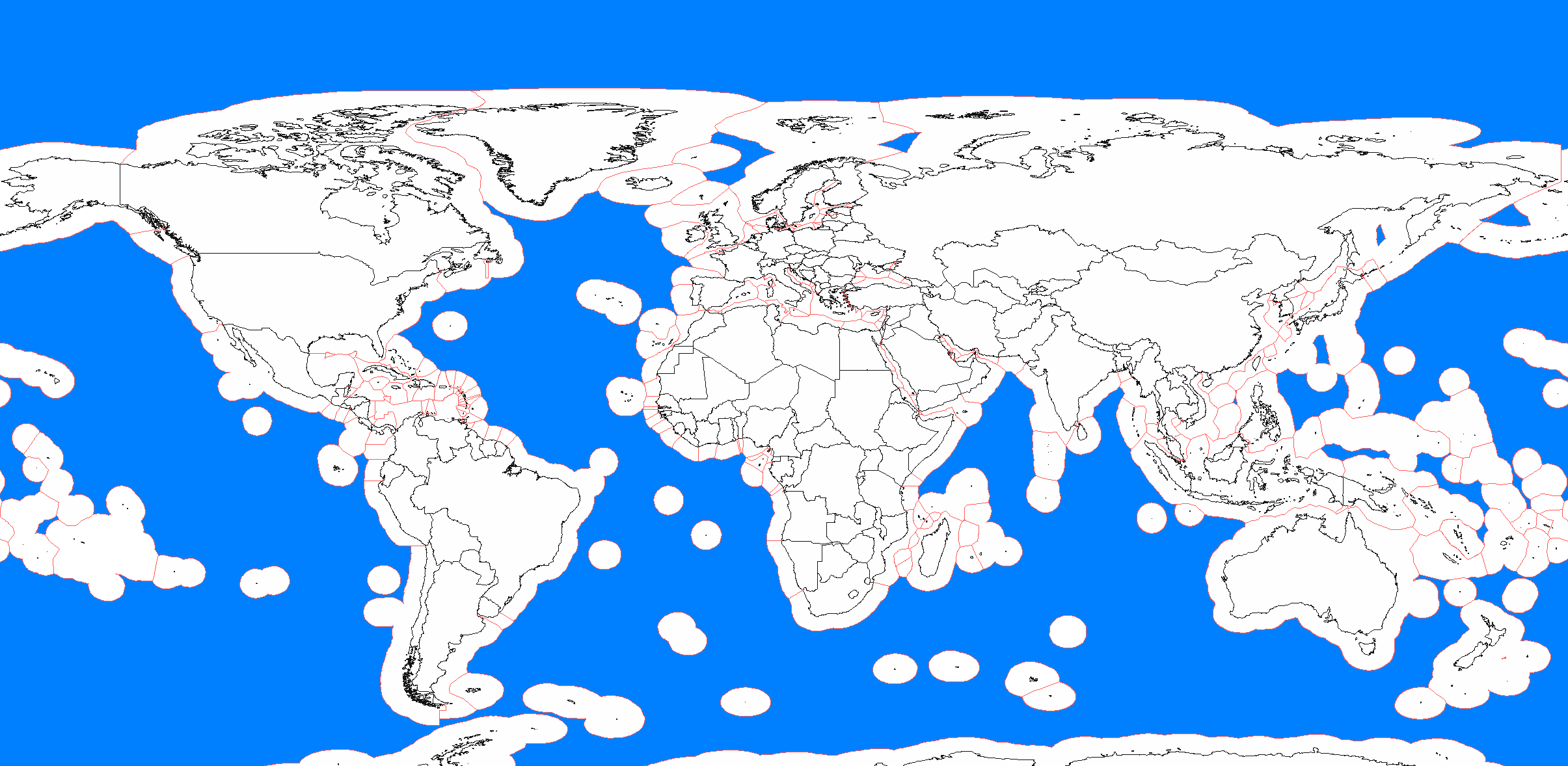
The world's EEZs are shown as a white extension of the land. International waters (high seas) are highlighted in blue.

The China National Fishery Corporation (CNFC) is the major operator in distant fisheries. According to a 2018 report, Chinese long-distance fishing was economically viable only with state subsidies.

China is ranked poorly in compliance with international distant waters fishing regulations both as a flag state and a port state. Vessels may remain at sea for years at a time with the help of fuel tankers and supply vessels. The crews on these vessels often suffer human rights violations.

=== Inland fisheries ===
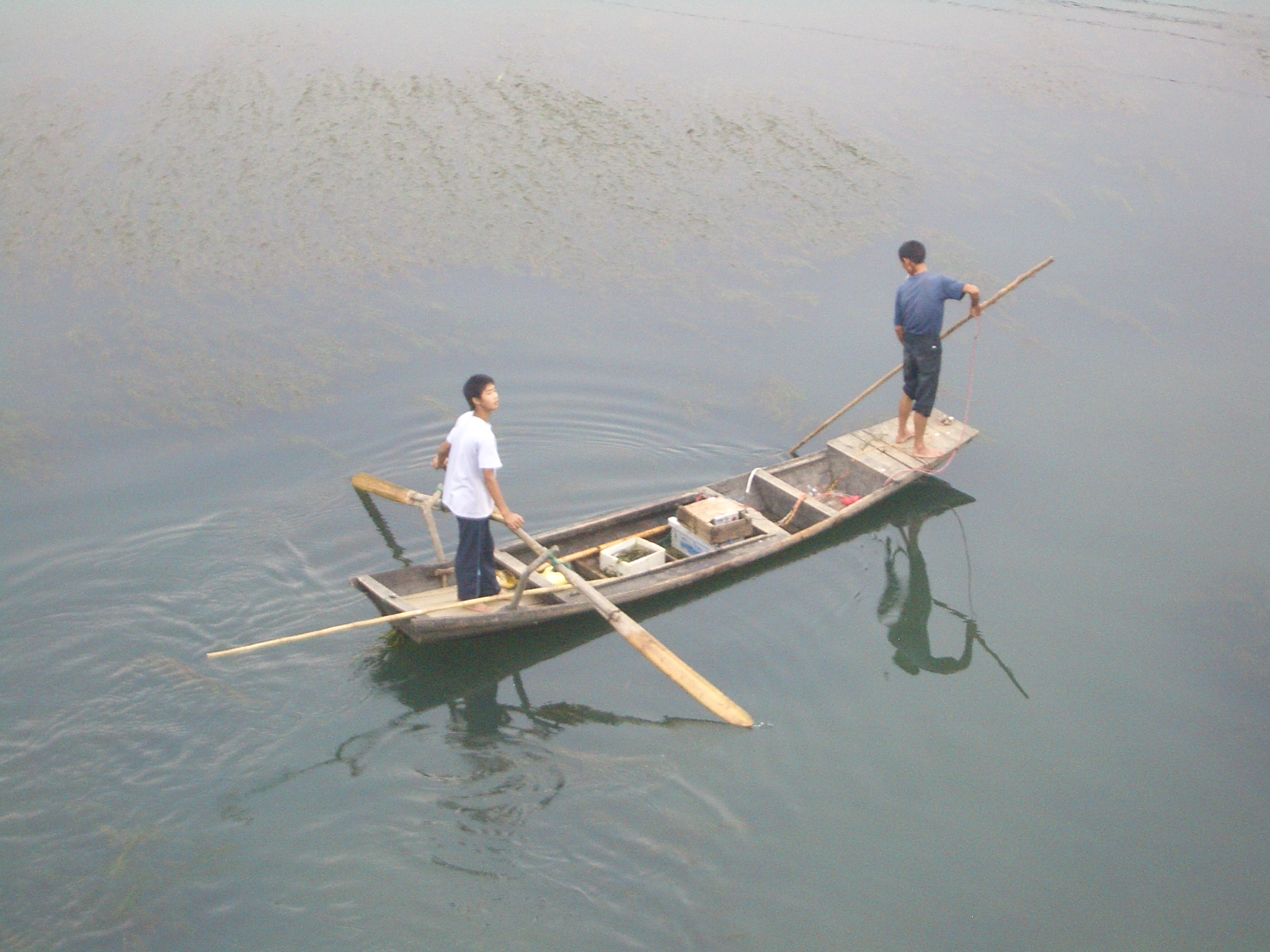
Fishermen on the Fushui River, China

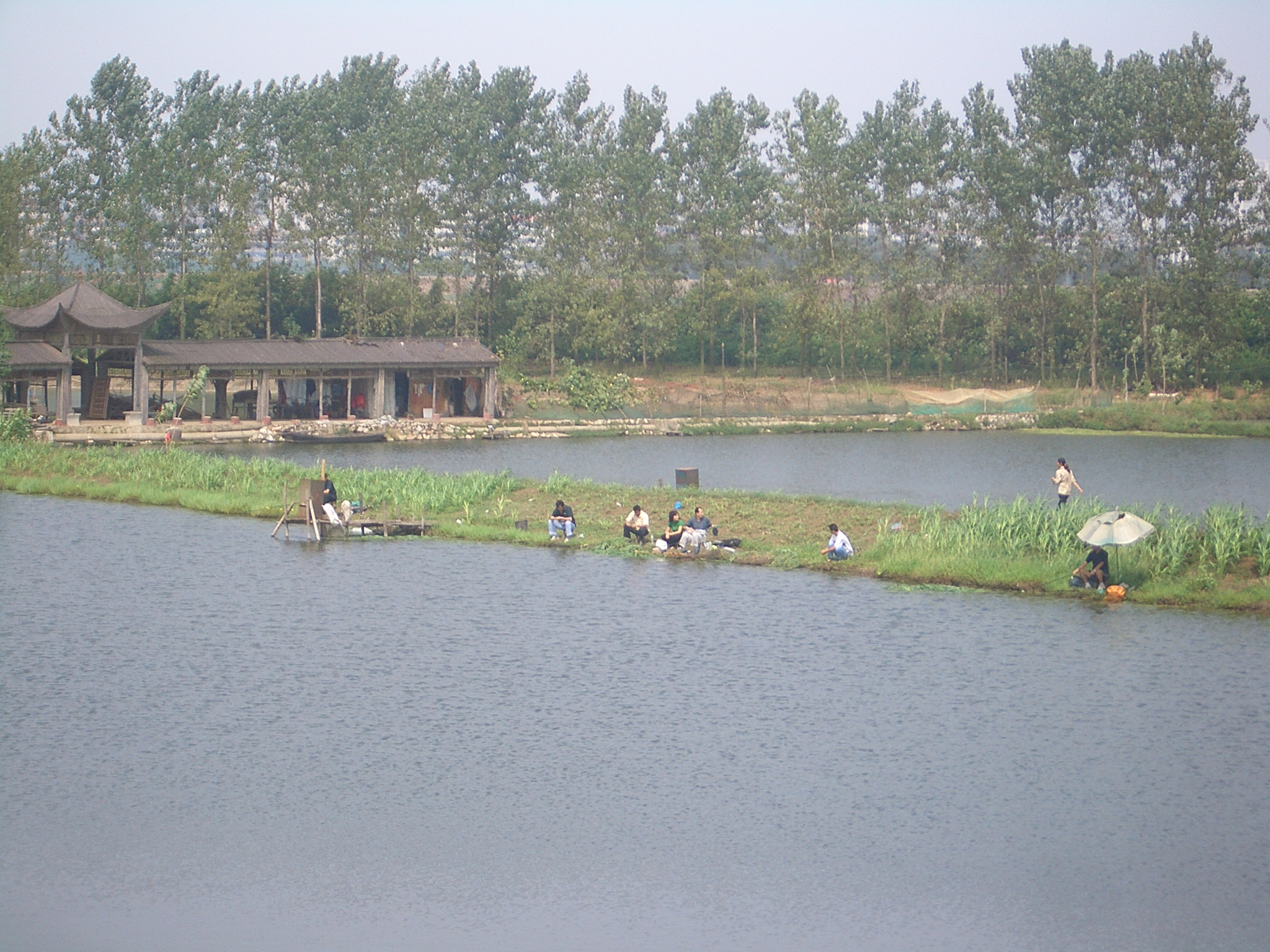
People fishing on a system of ponds constructed on a bay of the Daye Lake

Inland China has 176,000 square km of inland waters (1.8 percent of the inland area). Eighty thousand reservoirs contribute another 20,000 km^{2}.

China has 709 freshwater fish species and 58 subspecies, with another 64 species migrating between sea and inland waters.

Carp are a commercially important species, particularly silver carp, bighead carp, black carp, grass carp, common carp and crucian carp. Other commercially important species are bream, reeves shad, eel, cat fish, rainbow trout, salmon, whitebait, mullet, Siniperca chuatsi, perch, sturgeon, and murrel. Commercial shellfish include freshwater shrimp and river crabs, molluscs include freshwater mussels, clams and freshwater snails. Aquatic plants are also harvested: lotus, water chestnut and the gorgon nut Euryale ferox. Other commercial species include the soft-shell turtle and the frog.

Major lakes and rivers in China
| Lake | Location | Area (km2) | Fisheries |
|---|---|---|---|
| Qinghaihu Lake | Qinghai | 4,583 | |
| Qinghaihu Lake | Qinghai | 4,583 | |
| Poyang Lake | Jiangxi | 3,583 | |
| Luobubo Lake | Xinjiang | 3,006 | |
| Dongtinghu Lake | Hunan | 2,820 | |
| Lake Tai | Jiangsu | 2,420 | |
| Hulunhu Lake | Neimenggu | 2,315 | |
| Hongzehu Lake | Jiangsu | 1,586 | |
| River | Length (km) | Area (km2) | Fisheries |
| Yangtze River | 5,800 | 18,085 | |
| Yellow River | 5,464 | 7,524 | |
| Heilongjiang River | 2,965 | 8,900 | |
| Talimu River | 2,179 | 1,980 | |
| Zhujiang River | 2,129 | 4,257 | |
| Songhuajiang River | 1,840 | 5,456 | |
| Yaluzangbujiang River | 1,787 | 2,416 | |
| Lancangjiang River | 1,612 | 1,540 | |
| Nujiang River | 1,540 | 1,200 | |
| Hanjiang River | 1,532 | 1,744 | |
| Liaohe River | 1,430 | 1,920 | |
| Nenjiang River | 1,370 | 2,439 | |
| Yalongjiang River | 1,187 | 1,443 | |
| Yujiang River | 1,162 | | |
| Jialinjiang River | 1,119 | 1,598 | |
| Haihe River | 1,090 | 2,650 | |
| Wujiang River | 1,018 | 882 | |
| Huai River | 1,000 | 18,700 | |

=== Management ===
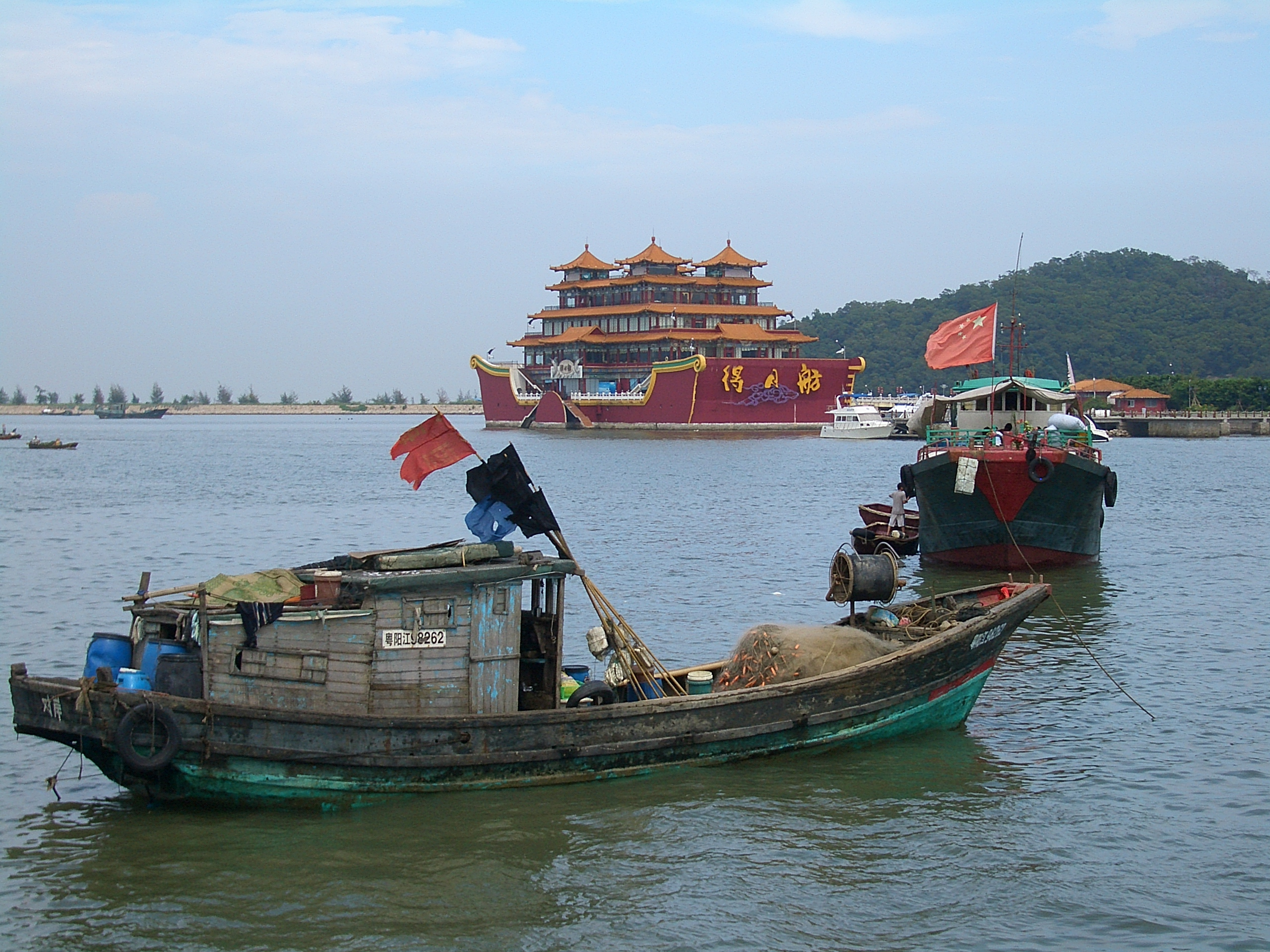
Zhuhai fishing port

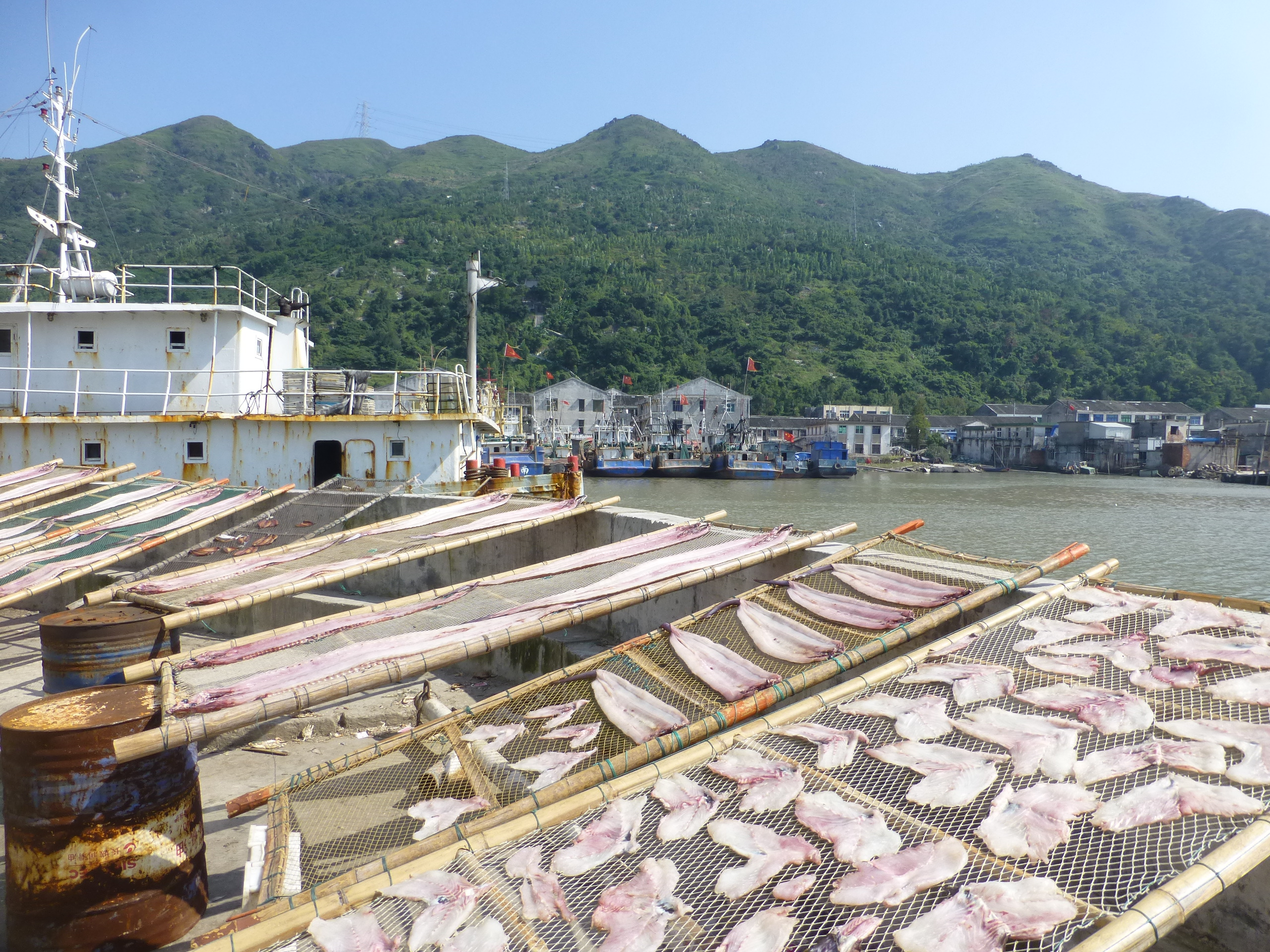
Fish being dried dockside at Pacao Harbor, Cangnan County, Zhejiang

Despite these efforts, overfishing continues to be a major problem in Chinese fisheries, with an estimated maximum sustainable yield of 750 to 1100 million tons in offshore regions far exceeded to the tune of 1200 to 1300 million tons, according to government statistics. In addition to the unsustainable catch, the rapid development of China's coastal cities and industries has created massive pollution - depleting the habitats and overall fishery numbers as well.

2010 marine fishery targets
| | 2002 | 2010 |
|---|---|---|
| Motorised fishing vessels | 220,000 | 192,000 |
| Fishing fleet power | 12.70 million kW | 11.43 million kW |
| Marine catch | 13.06 million ton | 12 million ton |

Fisheries authorities apply the following fishery management methods:

- Season moratorium: Since 1994, China has imposed a hot season moratorium in the Yellow Sea and the East China Sea. This moratorium affects 120,000 fishing vessels and one million fishermen. During this period, trawling and sailing stake net fishing are banned, and set nets are closed for at least two months in all marine areas. From 2004, all fishing operations, except use of gillnets with mesh size over 90 mm, are banned in Bohai Bay between 16 June and 1 September.
- Input controls: China uses input control as a major strategy. Regulation of Capture Fisheries Permit Management, issued in 2002, requires fisheries authorities in China to control the overall fishing capacity through target limits for vessels and gear, as well as through the issue of fishing permits.
- Output controls: These include regulation governing the allowed proportion of undersized fish in catch.

=== Over reporting ===
In 2001, fisheries scientists Reg Watson and Daniel Pauly expressed concerns in a letter to Nature that China had overreported its catch from wild fisheries during the 1990s. They said that made it appear that the global catch since 1988 was increasing annually by 300,000 tonnes, whereas instead it was shrinking annually by 350,000 tonnes. Watson and Pauly suggested this may be related to state entities tasked with increasing output. Until more recently, Chinese officials were promoted was based on production increases from their own areas.

China disputed this claim. The official Xinhua News Agency quoted Yang Jian, director general of the Agriculture Ministry's Bureau of Fisheries, as saying that China's figures were "basically correct". However, the FAO accepted there were issues with the reliability of China's statistical returns, and for a period treated data from China, including the aquaculture data, apart from the rest of the world.

=== Illegal, unreported and unregulated fishing (IUU) ===
China is claimed to be responsible for more illegal, unreported and unregulated (IUU) fishing than any other nation. The overcapitalization of the Chinese fishing fleet has exacerbated concerns about IUU. From modernization through 2008 China reduced the capacity of its fishing fleet. After 2008 capacity increase rapidly, linked to the rise of the People's Armed Forces Maritime Militia and subsidies given by regional and local governments to fishing companies to upgrade vessels. Other factors leading to the increase in China's fishing fleet include the BeiDou navigation/communication system and paramilitary training given to Chinese fishermen.

China's Distant Water Fishing (DWF) fleet hosts information personnel, including Party cells and security stewards, to enforce discipline and reporting under a "far-seas policing" model, while advanced communications systems allow vessels to serve as mobile data nodes supporting Beijing’s Blue Ocean Information Network, which integrates fixed, floating, and underwater sensors for persistent maritime surveillance.

==== Permanent Commission for the South Pacific (CPPS) ====
South American countries such as Chile, Ecuador, Peru, and Columbia; also known as the Permanent Commission to the South Pacific (CPPS), have been working to address the Chinese fishing industries effect on local fishing and environmental impact in Eastern Tropical Pacific Oceans. The main objective of the CPPS is to protect the ecological biodiversity of the Eastern Tropical Pacific Ocean through the enforcement of maritime law and environmental regulations. Large-scale industrial fishing can deeply impact domestic fishing industries, especially in South American countries through bycatch and other practices. The CPPS is directly linked to the Agreement on Port State Measure (PSMA) has enabled for the monitoring and surveillance of the Chinese fleet and identifying IUU fishing. CPPS and other UN groups such as the International Maritime Organization, the International Labour Organization, and the Food and Agriculture Organization have been trying to limit IUU fishing, with limited success. UN and NGO initiatives to eliminate IUU fishing have not ended IUU fishing.

==== Non-government organizations ====
Sea Shepherd Conservation has worked to eliminate IUU fishing in the Eastern Tropic Pacific (ETP), especially UNESCO Heritage Sites such as the Galapagos Islands, Malpelo Island, and Coiba National Park. Sea Shepherd works with ETP naval forces to detect and combat IUU fishing. Other Non-Government Organizations (NGO) such as Global Fishing Watch, Oceana, and SkyTruth have been involved in the legal and physical process of detaining fishing vessels.

==== Africa ====
IUU causes loss by flooding markets with low-cost illegal catch. Africa loses an estimated $11.2 billion annually, including $9.4 billion in West Africa, where PRC trawlers damage seabeds and deplete fish stocks critical to livelihoods and food security.

==== Latin America ====
Latin America incurs up to $2.3 billion in annual losses, including $600 million in lost income and about $500 million in lost tax revenue.

===== Galapagos =====
A Chinese fishing fleet numbering hundreds of vessels visits the ocean around the Galapagos Islands each year.

Ecuadorian authorities and civil society accuse the Chinese of fishing indiscriminately and without respect for the law or regulations. While Chinese fishing vessels have visited the area every year since 1978 the number and size of the vessels has vastly increased in recent years.

The exploitation of marine resources by illegal means is a problem acknowledged by Latin American countries on the Pacific coast. In November, 2020, the governments of Colombia, Chile, Peru and Ecuador released a joint official communique pledging to combat IUU off of its coasts in the coming decade. The governments of these four countries have pledged to increase international cooperation in the protection of the South American Pacific Coast. The Chilean government has stated that it aims to aid in the designation of 30% of the ocean as a marine protected area by 2030 in an effort to disincentive IUU fishing. Global Fishing watch has also stated that greater transparency between Latin American nations and international cooperation are necessary to curb illegal fishing in the area.

==== North Korea ====
Chinese commercial fishermen have engaged in large scale squid fishing in North Korean waters in violation of U.N. sanctions that prohibit foreign fishing vessels from fishing in North Korean waters. The Chinese squid fishing fleet in North Korean waters has at times numbered 800 vessels and caused a 70% drop in local squid stock. According to Global Fishing Watch "This is the largest known case of illegal fishing perpetrated by a single industrial fleet operating in another nation's waters." The decline in the squid stocks as a result of this illegal fishing is believed to be a contributing factor to the increase in North Korean ghost ships. The so called "dark fleet" has harvested half a billion dollars' worth of squid in North Korean waters since 2017.

==== Taiwan ====
The decline in China's coastal fish stocks and the imposition of more expansive closed seasons led to an increase in Chinese fishermen illegally fishing in Taiwanese waters.

== Aquaculture ==
Aquaculture has been used in China since the 2nd millennium BC. When the waters lowered after river floods, some fishes, mainly carp, were held in artificial ponds. Their brood were later fed using nymphs and silkworm feces, while the fish themselves were eaten as a source of protein. By a fortunate genetic mutation, this early domestication of carp led to the development of goldfish in the Tang dynasty.

Cyprinus carpio is the number one fish of aquaculture. The annual tonnage of common carp, not to mention the other cyprinids, produced in China exceeds the weight of all other fish, such as trout and salmon, produced by aquaculture worldwide.

Since the 1970s, the reform policies have resulted in the rapid development of China's aquaculture, both in fresh and in sea waters. Total aquaculture areas rose from 2.86 million hectors in 1979 to 5.68 million hectors in 1996, and the production rose from 1.23 million tonnes to 15.31 million tonnes.

In 2005, worldwide aquaculture production including aquatic plants was worth US$78.4 billion. Of this, the Chinese production was worth US$39.8 billion. In the same year there were about 12 million fish farmers worldwide. Of these, China reported 4.5 million employed full-time in aquaculture.

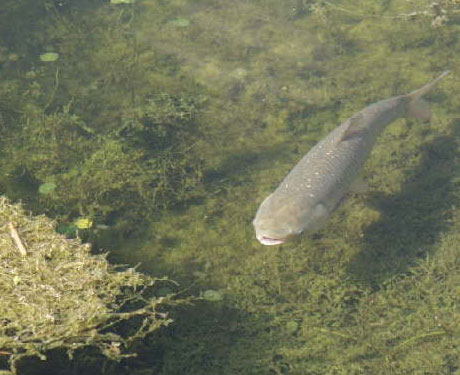
Grass carp

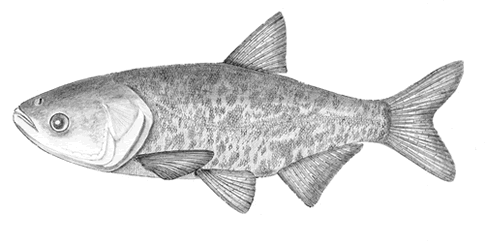
Bighead carp

Top 10 species grown in China in 2005
| Species | Tonnes |
| Japanese kelp | 4 314 000 |
| Grass carp | 3 857 000 |
| Pacific cupped oyster | 3 826 000 |
| Silver carp | 3 525 000 |
| Japanese carpet shell | 2 857 000 |
| Common carp | 2 475 000 |
| Wakame | 2 395 000 |
| Bighead carp | 2 182 000 |
| Crucian carp | 2 083 000 |
| Yesso scallop | 1 036 000 |

Production, area and yield: 2003
| | Total production (tons) | Area used (ha) | Yield (kg/ha) |
|---|---|---|---|
| Overall total | 30,275,795 | 7,103,648 | 4,260 |
| Marine culture | 12,533,061 | 1,532,152 | 8,180 |
| Inland culture | 17,742,734 | 5,571,496 | 3,180 |
| Pond | 12,515,093 | 2,398,740 | 5,220 |
| Lake | 1,051,930 | 936,262 | 1,120 |
| Reservoirs | 1,841,245 | 1,660,027 | 1,110 |
| Rivers | 738,459 | 382,170 | 1,930 |
| Rice paddies | 1,023,611 | 1,558,042 | 660 |
| Other | 572,396 | 194,297 | 2,950 |

=== Inland aquaculture ===
In 1979, inland aquaculture occupied 237.8 million hectares and produced 813,000 tonnes. In 1996, they occupied 485.8 million hectares and produced 10.938 million tonnes. In that year, 17 provinces produced 100,000 tonnes from inland aquaculture.

Pond culture is the most common method of inland aquaculture (73.9% in 1996). These ponds are mostly found around the Pearl River basin and along the Yangtze River. They cover seven provinces: Anhui, Guangdong, Hubei, Hunan, Jiangsu, Jiangxi and Shandong. The government has also supported developments in rural areas to get rid of poverty. The sector is significant from a nutrition point of view, because it brings seafood to areas inland away from the sea where consumption of seafood has traditionally been low.

In recent times, China has extended its skills in culturing pond system to open waters such as lakes, rivers, reservoirs and channels, by incorporating cages, nets and pens.

Fish farming in paddy fields is also developing. In 1996, paddy fish farming occupied 12.05 million hectares producing 376,800 tonnes. A further 16 million hectares of paddy fields are available for development.

Species introduced from other parts of the world are also being farmed, such as rainbow trout, tilapia, paddle fish, toad catfish, silver salmon, river perch, roach and Collossoma brachypomum.

=== Marine aquaculture ===
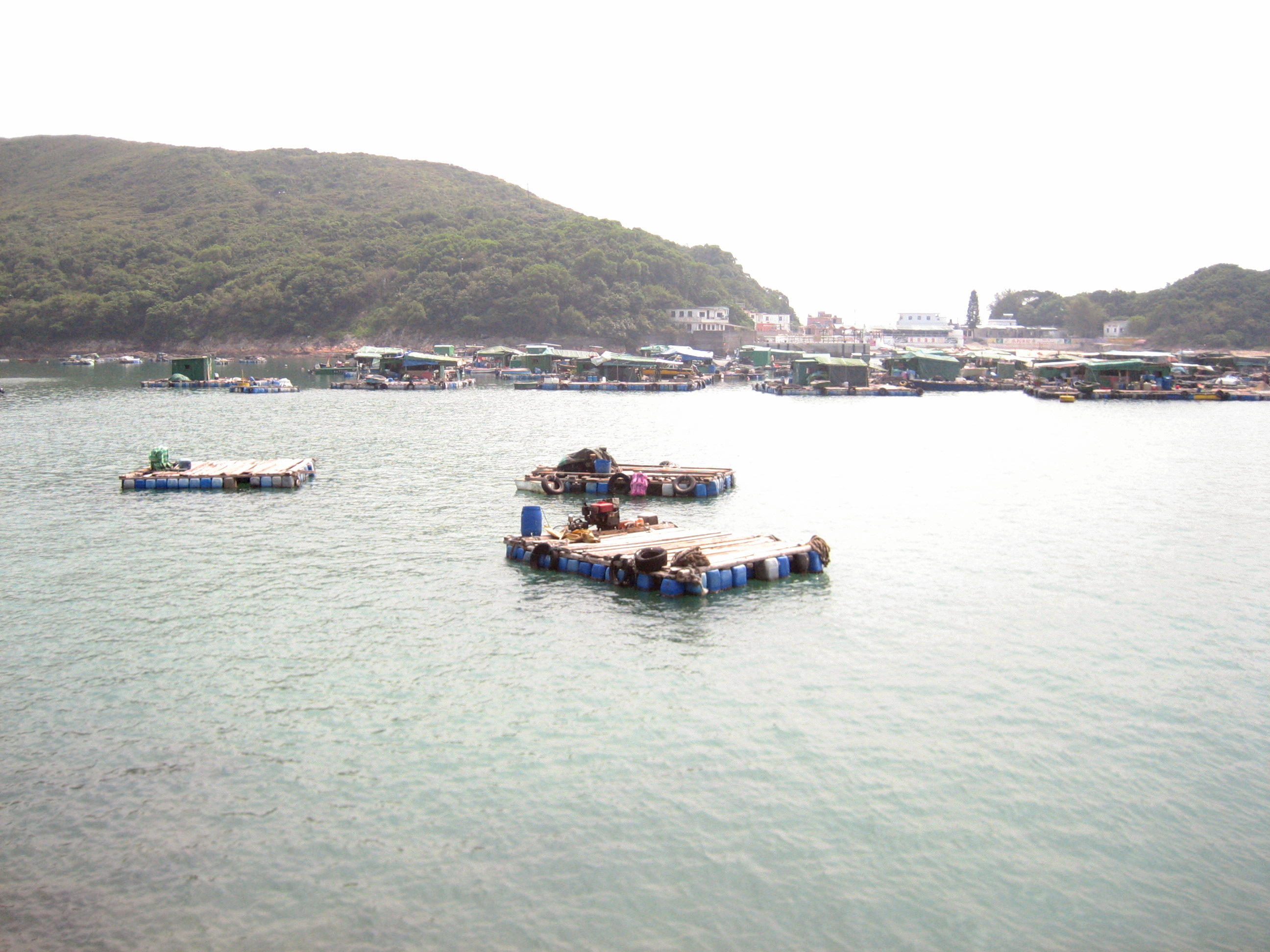
Mariculture off High Island, Hong Kong

Using current culture technologies, much farmed cultivation of marine plants and animals can be applied within the 10 metre isobath in marine environments. There are about 1.33 million hectares of marine cultivable areas in China, including shallow seas, mudflats and bays. Before 1980, less than nine percent of these areas were cultivated, and species were mainly confined to kelp, laver (Porphyra) and mussels.

Between 1989 and 1996, areas of cultivated shallow sea were increased from 25,200 to 114,200 hectares, areas of mudflat from 266,800 to 533,100 hectares, and areas of bay from 131,300 to 174,800 hectares. The 1979 production was 415,900 tonnes on 117,000 hectares, and the 1996 production was 4.38 million tonnes on 822,000 hectares.

Since the 1980s, the government has encouraged the introduction of different marine species, including the large shrimp or prawn Penaeus chinensis, as well as scallop, mussel, sea bream, abalone, grouper and the mud mangrove crab Scylla serrata. The large yellow croaker is the most cultivated marine fish in China.

In 1989, production of farmed shrimp was 186,000 tonnes, and China was the largest producer in the world. In 1993 viral disease struck, and by 1996 production declined to 89,000 tonnes. This was attributed to inadequate management such as overfeeding and high stock densities.

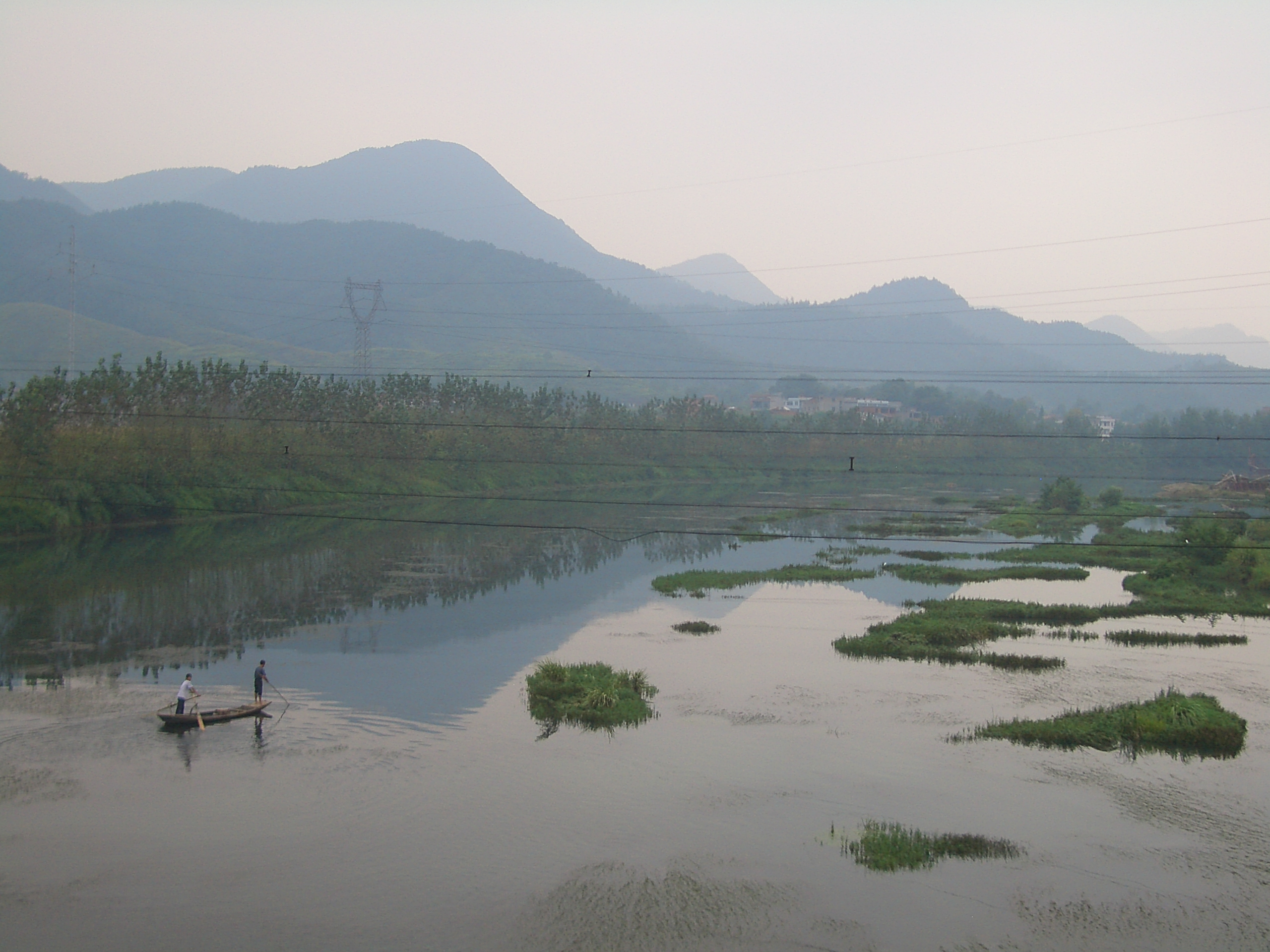

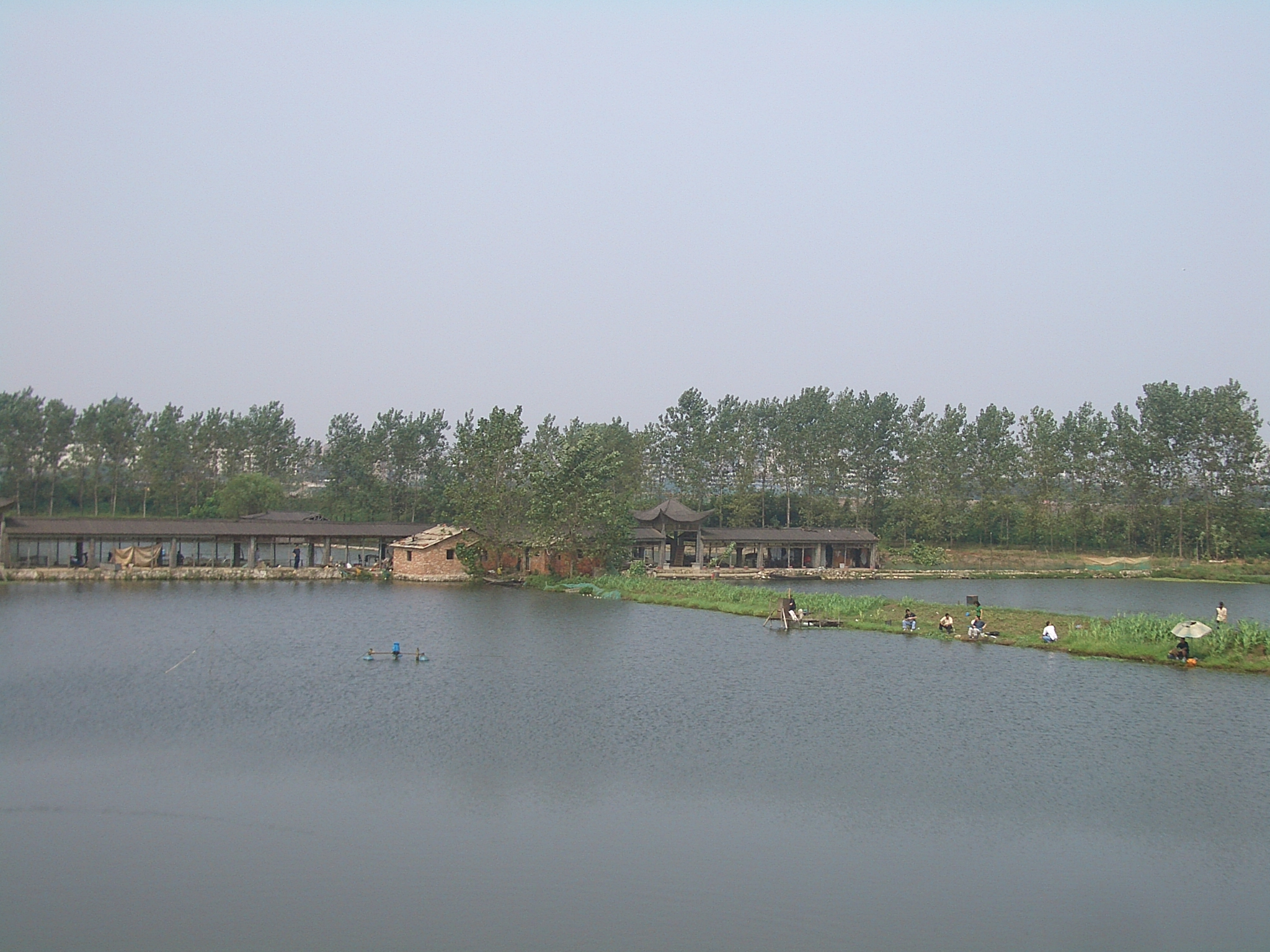

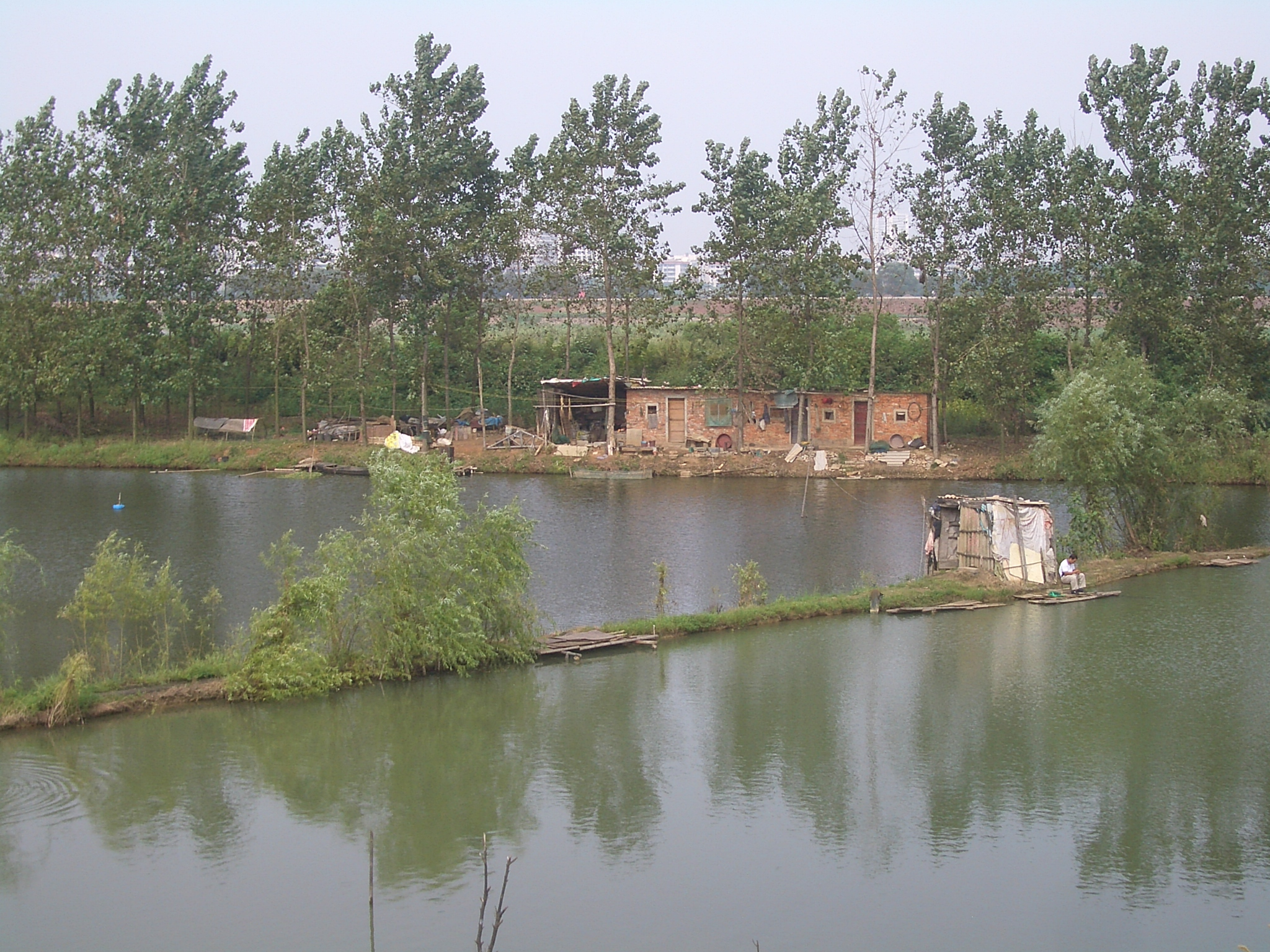

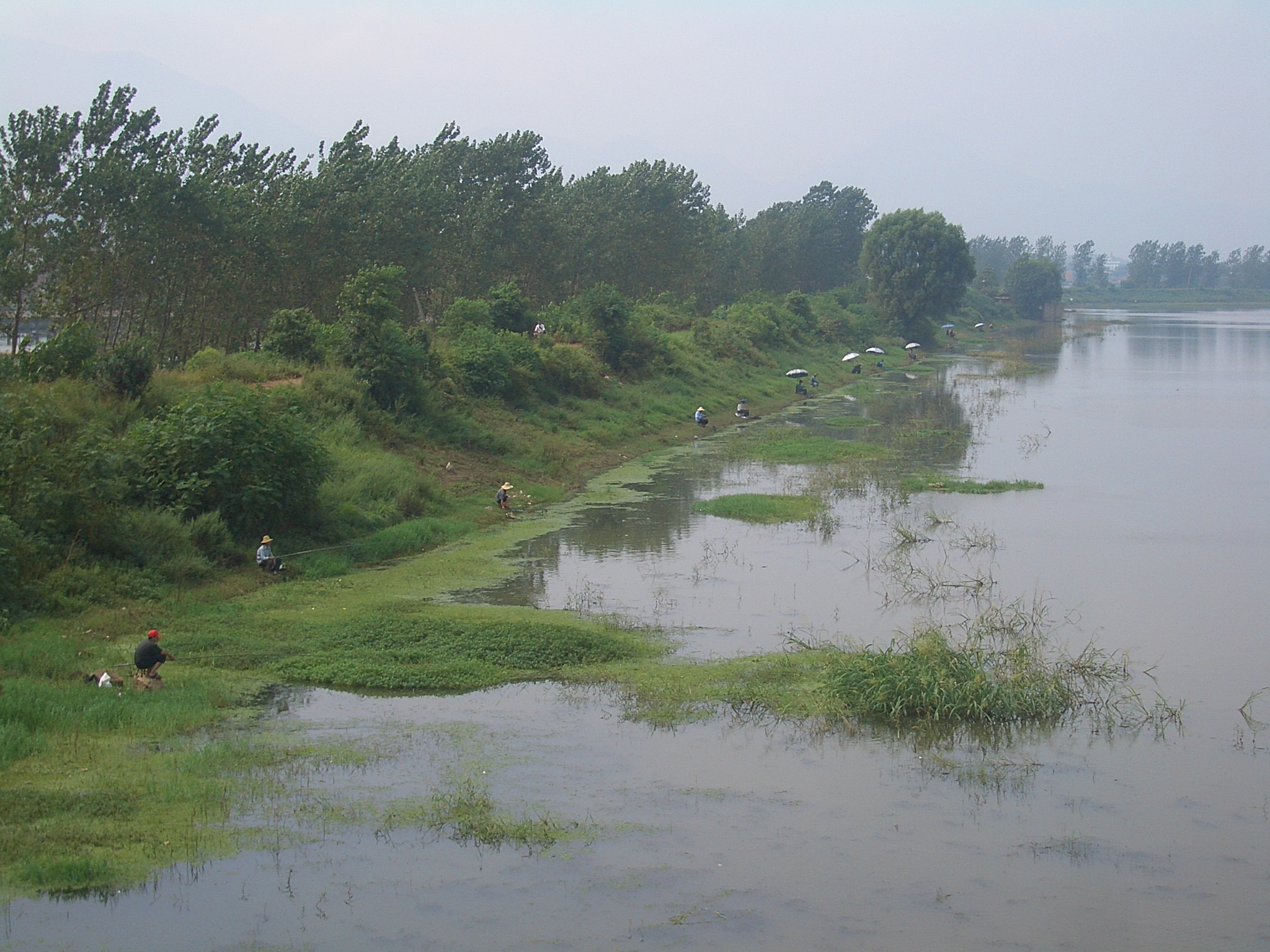

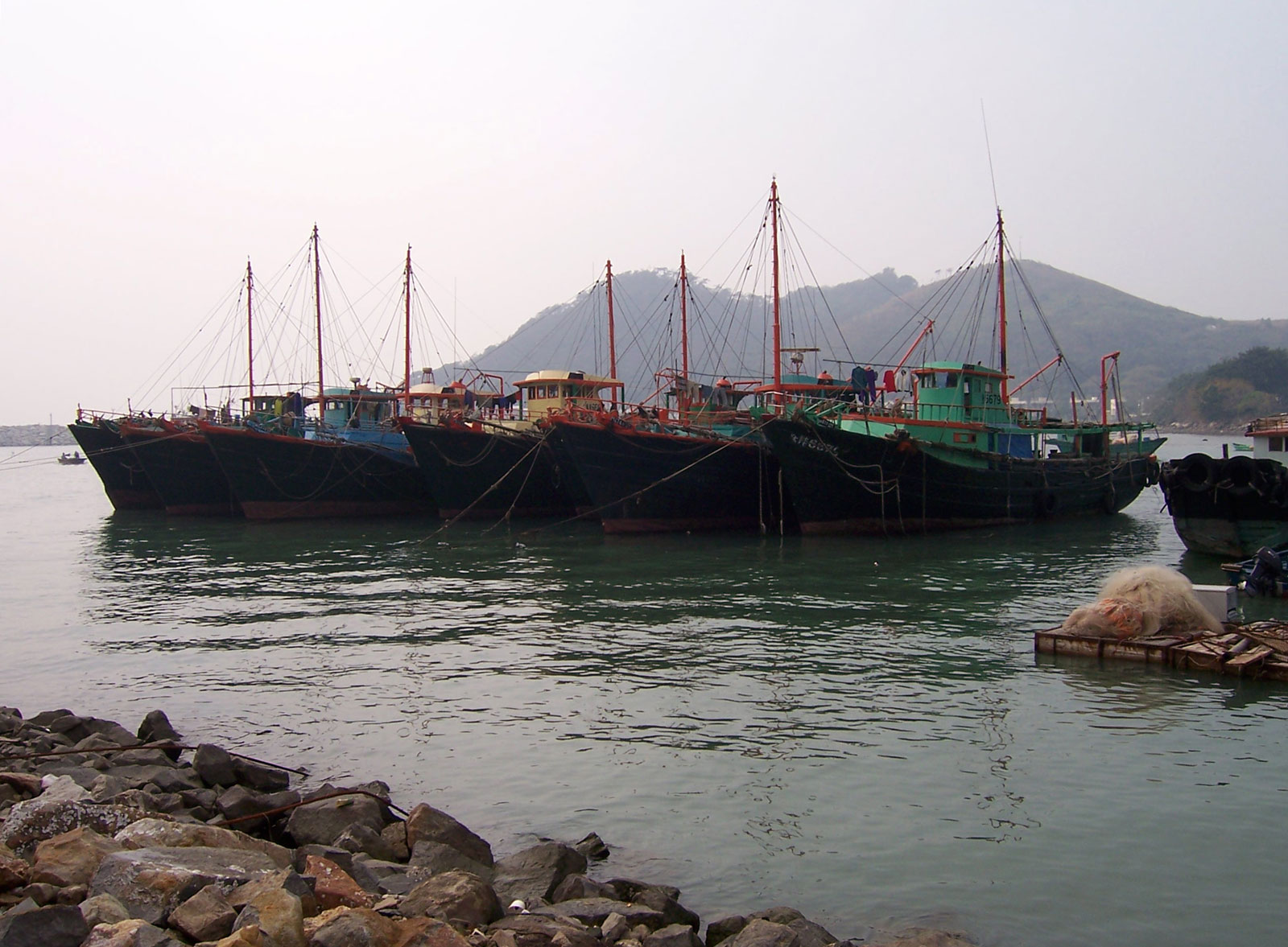

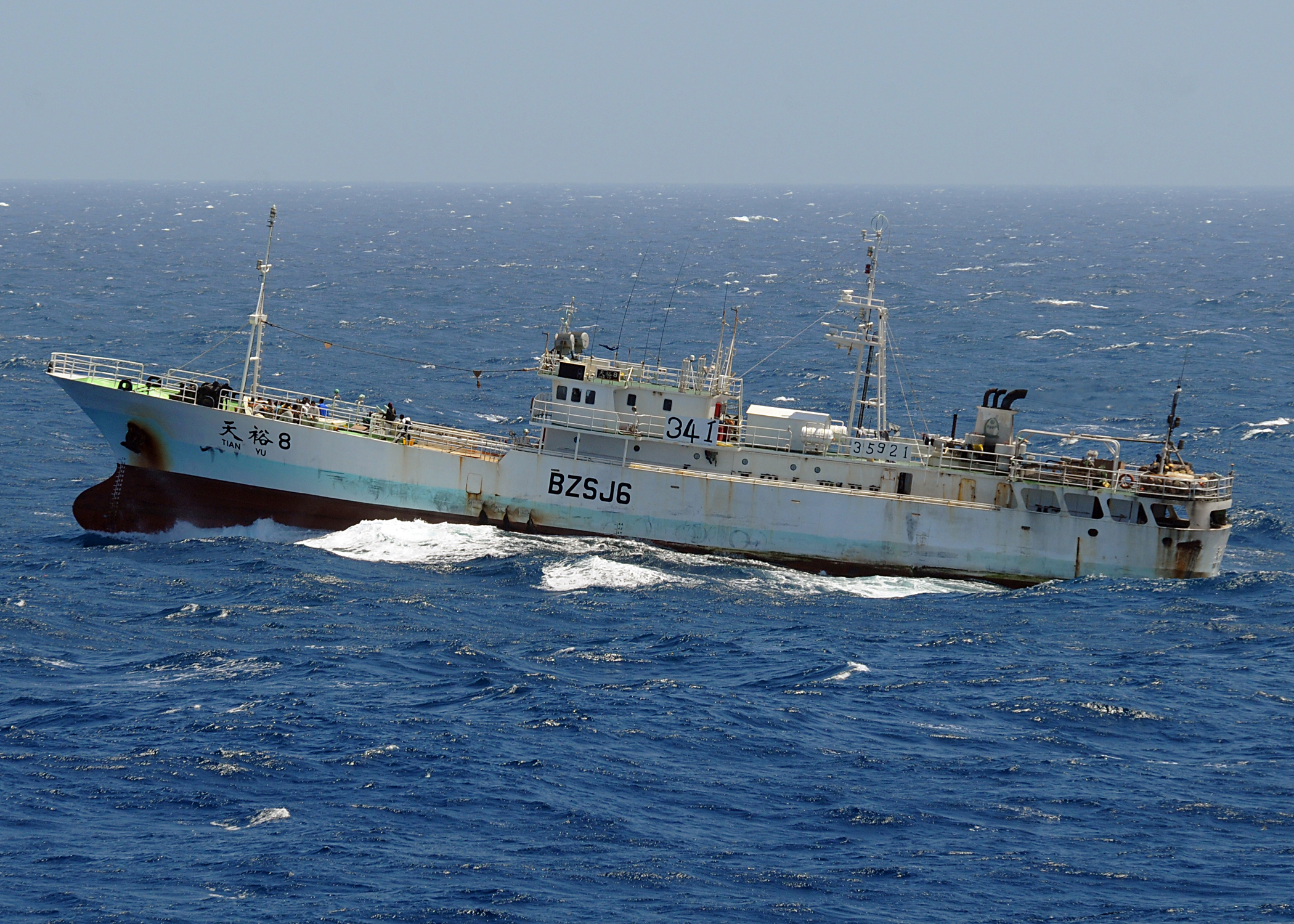

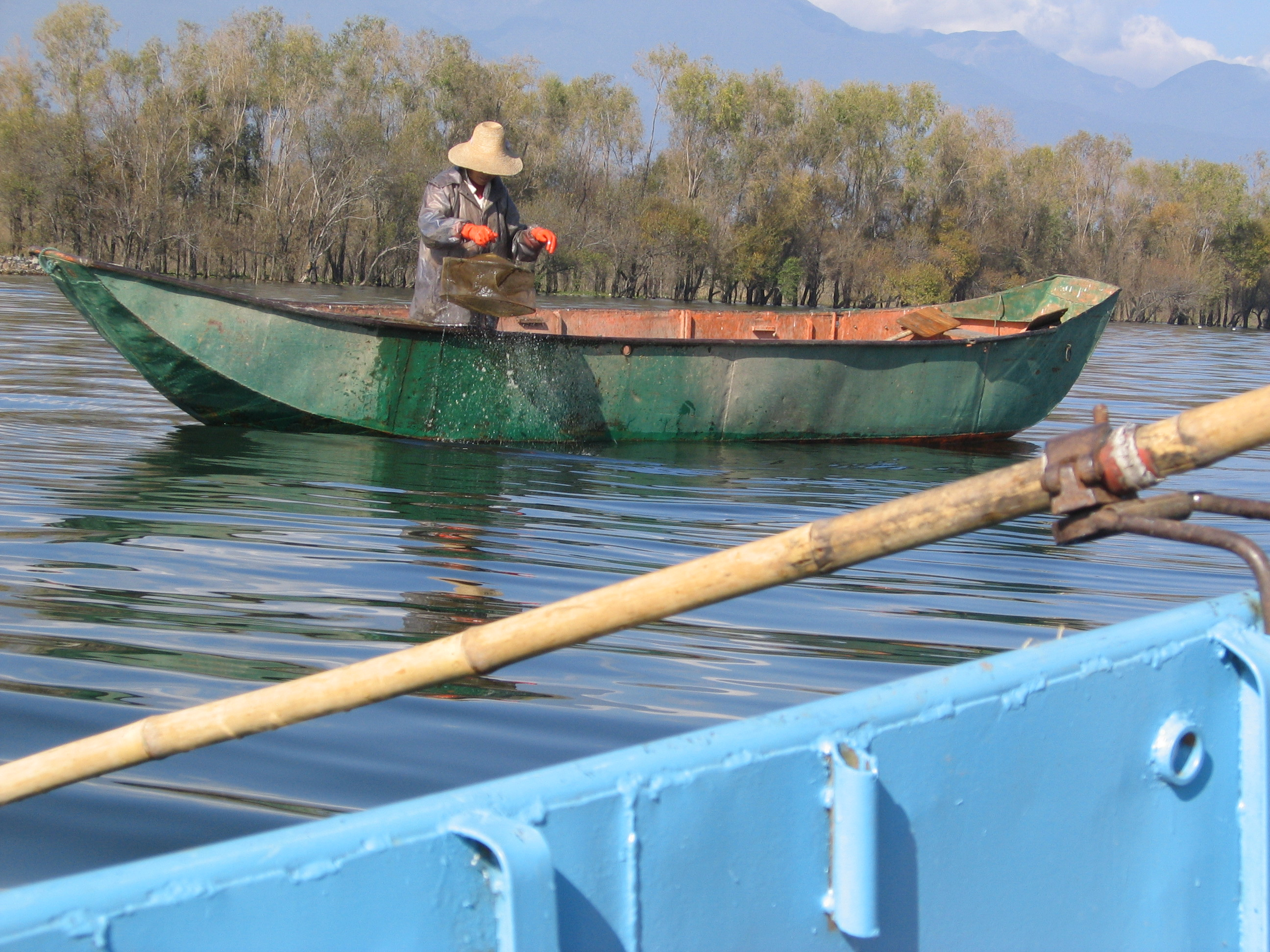

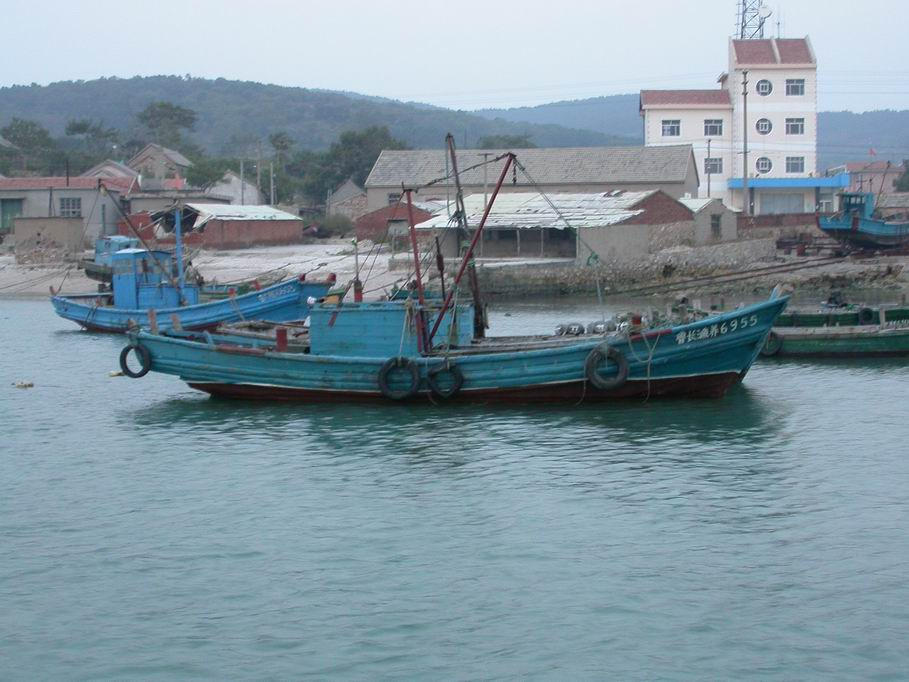

== History ==
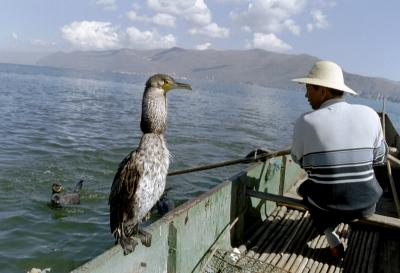
A Chinese fisherman with his cormorant on Erhai Lake near Dali, Yunnan

Historically, cormorant fishing has been a significant fishing technique in China. To control the birds, the fishermen tie a snare near the base of the bird's throat. This prevents the birds from swallowing larger fish, which are held in their throat. When a cormorant has caught a fish, the fisherman brings the bird back to the boat and has the bird spit the fish out. Chinese fishermen often employ great cormorants. Though cormorant fishing used to be a successful fishing industry, its primary use today is to serve the tourism industry. In Guilin, Guangxi Province, cormorant birds are famous for fishing on the shallow Lijiang River.

A ten-year fishing ban is in place for the Yangtze River for the period 2020 to 2030.

== Public perception ==
An opinion piece from the Associated Press claimed that in China the high seas fishing fleet is "a source of national pride" similar to what the U.S. space program was for generations of Americans."

== See also ==
- Chinese Academy of Fishery Sciences
- Chinese bahaba
- Cultured freshwater pearls
- Water resources of China
- China's dark fleet
