= Chinese Academy of Fishery Sciences =

Chinese research institute

Coordinates: 39°53′43″N 116°15′51″E

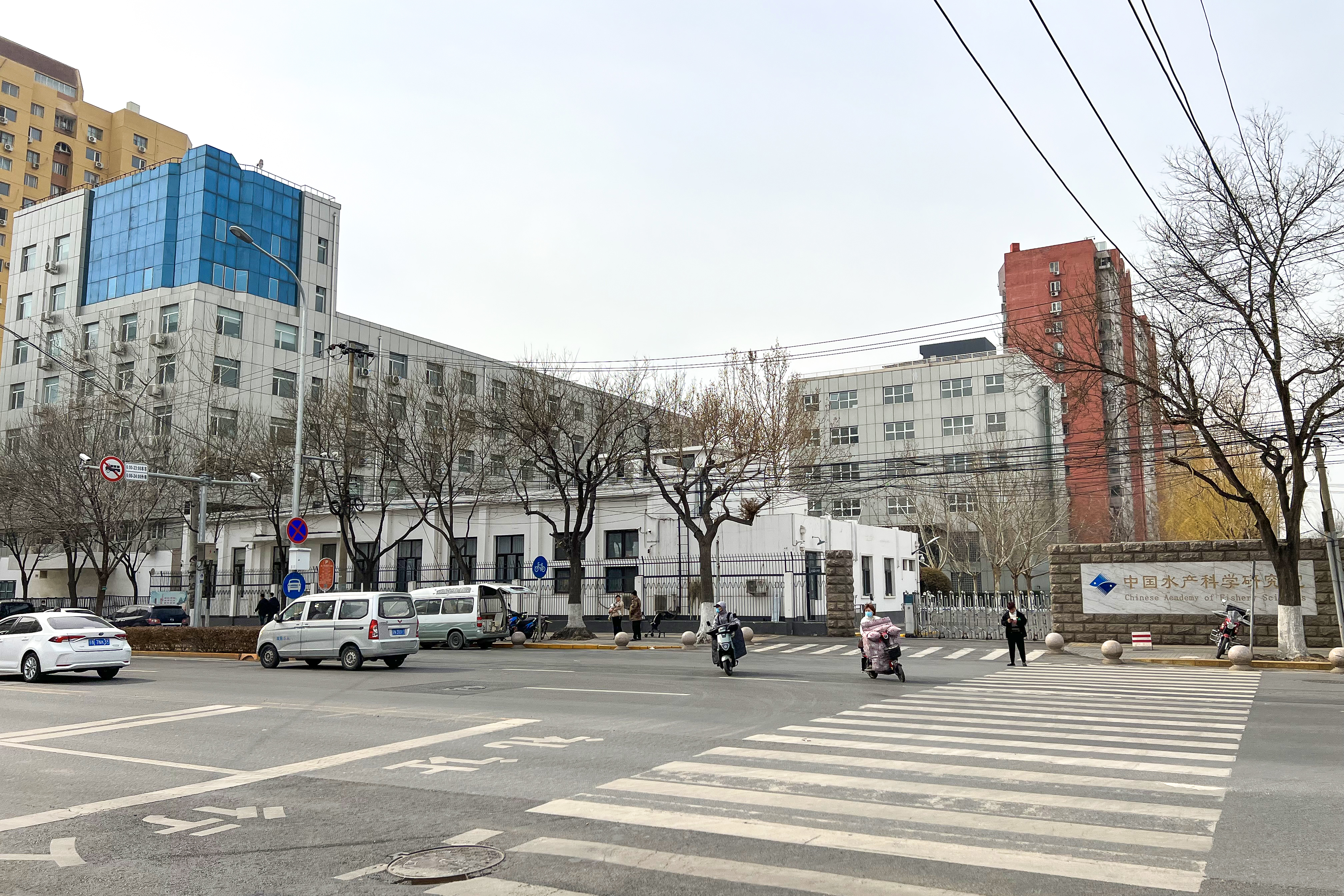
- Abbreviation: CAFS
- Formation: 1978; 48 years ago
- Type: Nonprofit research organization
- Purpose: Fisheries science and aquaculture
- Headquarters: Beijing
- Location: 14 locations across China
- Region served: China
- Members: FishBase Consortium
- Parent organization: Ministry of Agriculture
- Staff: 1590 scientists
- Website: www.cafs.ac.cn/english/

The Chinese Academy of Fishery Sciences (CAFS) (simplified Chinese: 中国水产科学研究院; traditional Chinese: 中國水產科學研究院; Pinyin: Zhōngguó shuǐchǎn Kēxuéyánjiūyuàn) is a large fisheries research institute. It was founded in 1978 under the Ministry of Agriculture in the People's Republic of China. It is a leading research institution in China, active in almost all research areas to do with aquaculture and marine and freshwater fisheries.

CAFS sponsors the award-winning international academic periodical Journal of Fishery Sciences of China. It has completed over 1,000 research projects, including a study on the aquaculture of the fleshy prawn Peneaus chinensis and the control of haemorrhage disease in grass carp, which won the National Scientific and Technological Progress First Prize. The institute has contributed significantly to China's aquaculture development.

== Activities ==
Aquaculture has been pursued in China for at least 2,400 years. A tract by Fan Li in the fifth century BC details many of the ways carp were raised in ponds. The major carp species used traditionally in Chinese aquaculture are the black, grass, silver and bighead carp. In the 1950s, the Pearl River Fishery Research Institute of CAFS made a technological breakthrough in the induced breeding of these carps, which has resulted in a rapid expansion of freshwater aquaculture in China.

In the late 1990s, CAFS scientists developed a new variant of the common carp called the Jian carp. This succulent fish grows rapidly and has a high feed conversion rate. Over 50% of the total aquaculture production of carp in China has now converted to Jian carp.

The Chinese sturgeon is an endangered species native to China. It is strictly protected by the Chinese government, who have declared it a national treasure. The Yangtze River Fisheries Research Institute of CAFS is breeding sturgeons in captivity in an attempt to restore the river population before the species disappears. Some success has been claimed from artificial inducement for spawning and stream discharge for incubation. During the course of the project, 5 million fish bred in captivity have been released into the wild. In 2005, to mark the twentieth anniversary of China's efforts to protect the species, 10,000 sturgeon fry, 200 junior sturgeon and two adult fish were released into the Yangtze River at Yichang. However, in 2007, 14 young sturgeon were surveyed near the mouth of Yangtze compared with 600 the year before, causing concern that the battle was being lost in the crowded and polluted Yangtze River.

The major traditional aquaculture carp of China
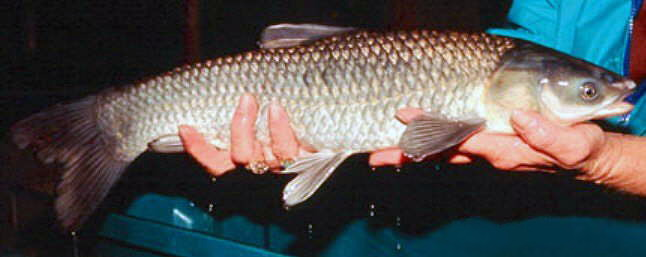
Black carp

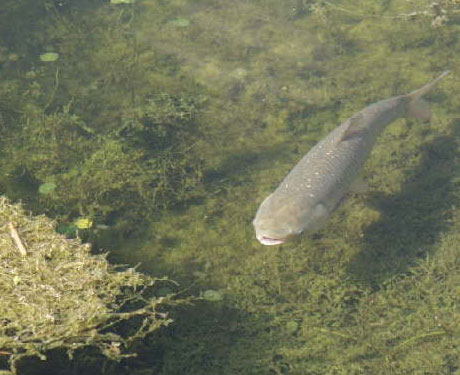
Grass carp

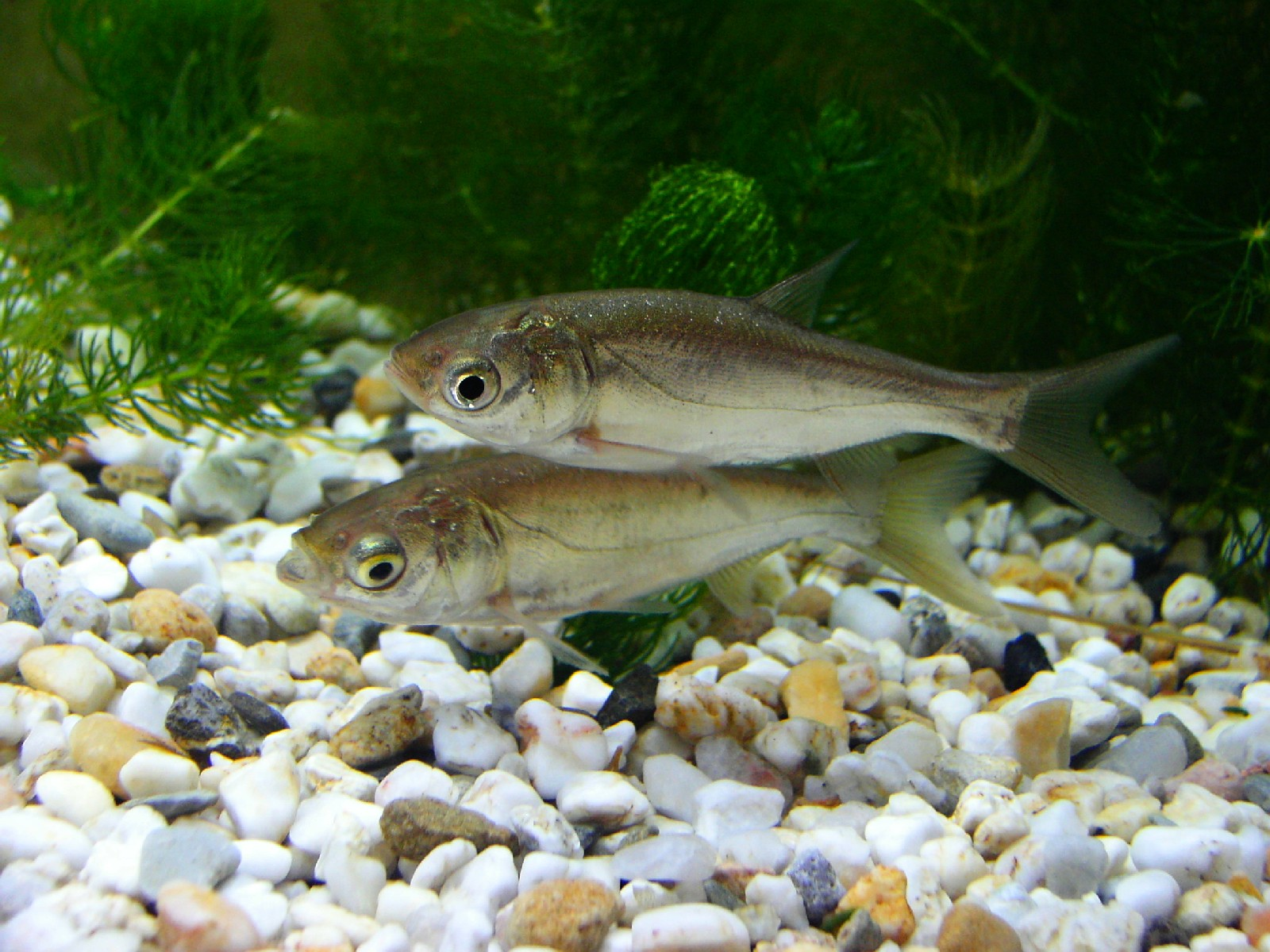
Silver carp

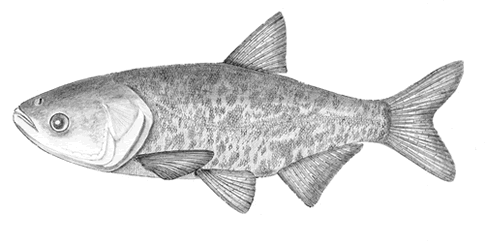
Bighead carp

== Structure ==
CAFS has its headquarters in Beijing. Across China, it operates nine fisheries research institutes and four fisheries resources enhancement stations.

Satellite institutions
Sea areas	Yellow Sea Fisheries Research Institute	Qingdao, Shandong province
Sea areas	East China Sea Fisheries Research Institute	Shanghai city
Sea areas	South China Sea Fisheries Research Institute	Guangzhou, Guangdong province
Inland areas	Helongjiang Fisheries Research Institute	Harbin, Helongjiang province
Inland areas	Yangtze River Fisheries Research Institute	Jingzhou, Hubei province
Inland areas	Pearl River Fisheries Research Institute	Guangzhou, Guangdong province
Inland areas	Freshwater Fisheries Research Center	Wuxi, Jiangsu province
Engineering	Fishery Machinery and Instrument Research Institute	Shanghai city
Engineering	Fishery Engineering Research Institute	Wuxi Jiangsu province
Marine resource enhancement		Qinhuangdao, Hebei province
Marine resource enhancement		Changdao, Shandong province
Marine resource enhancement		Yinkou, Liaoning province
Marine resource enhancement		Changyi, Shandong province

== Some associated publications ==
- Chen D, Duan X, Liu S and Shi W (2003) Status and Management of Fishery Resources of the Yangtze River In: Proceedings of the Second International Symposium on the Management of Large Rivers for Fisheries. FAO Corporate Document Repository.
- Yulin J (1996) A Review of Traditional and Innovative Aquaculture Health Management in the People's Republic of China In: Health management in Asian aquaculture, FAO Corporate Document Repository. ISBN 92-5-103917-8.

== See also ==
- Fishing industry in China
- Aquaculture in China
