= China National Fisheries Corporation =

Chinese state-owned company

The China National Fisheries Corporation (CNFC) is a Chinese state owned enterprise which operates fisheries related businesses.

== History ==
CNFC is the major Chinese operator in the distant water fisheries. It sent the first Chinese fishing fleet to West African waters when it sent thirteen trawlers to Guinea-Bissau in 1985. The fleet was seen off by a crowd of more than 1,000. The expansion into distant water fisheries followed a decline in China's coastal fisheries due to overexploitation. The following year, with other Chinese partners, CNFC started trawling operations in the North Pacific. Tuna longlining followed in the South Pacific, and in 1989, squid longlining in the Japan Sea and the North Pacific. CNFC has been a significant beneficiary of corporate subsidies from the Chinese government.

"China has the world's largest distant-water fishing fleet, catching billions of pounds of seafood annually, the biggest portion of it squid. The fleet is rife with labor trafficking, abusive working conditions, and violence."

In 2016 CNFC had to bail out its listed arm CNFC Overseas Fishery Co. due to poor profitability.

In 2022 CNFC completed a four hundred million CNY fundraising round to recapitalize its tuna fleet.

A 2023 report by the Financial Transparency Coalition noted that five CNFC vessels had been accused of human rights abuses. The third most of any Chinese company.

== Facilities ==
In 2019 CNFC opened a tuna processing plant in Vanuatu.

== Vessels ==
In addition to fishing vessels CNFC operates refrigerated cargo vessels.
