= Invasive Species Act =

Invasive Species Act may refer to:

- National Invasive Species Act, a 1996 United States federal law
- North Texas Invasive Species Barrier Act of 2014, a 2014 Texas state law in the United States
- Invasive Species Act (Ontario), a 2015 Ontario provincial law in Canada

== See also ==
- Alien Species Prevention and Enforcement Act of 1992 - a United States federal law
- British Columbia Weed Control Act
- Hazardous Substances and New Organisms Act 1996 of New Zealand
