= Invasive species in the United States =

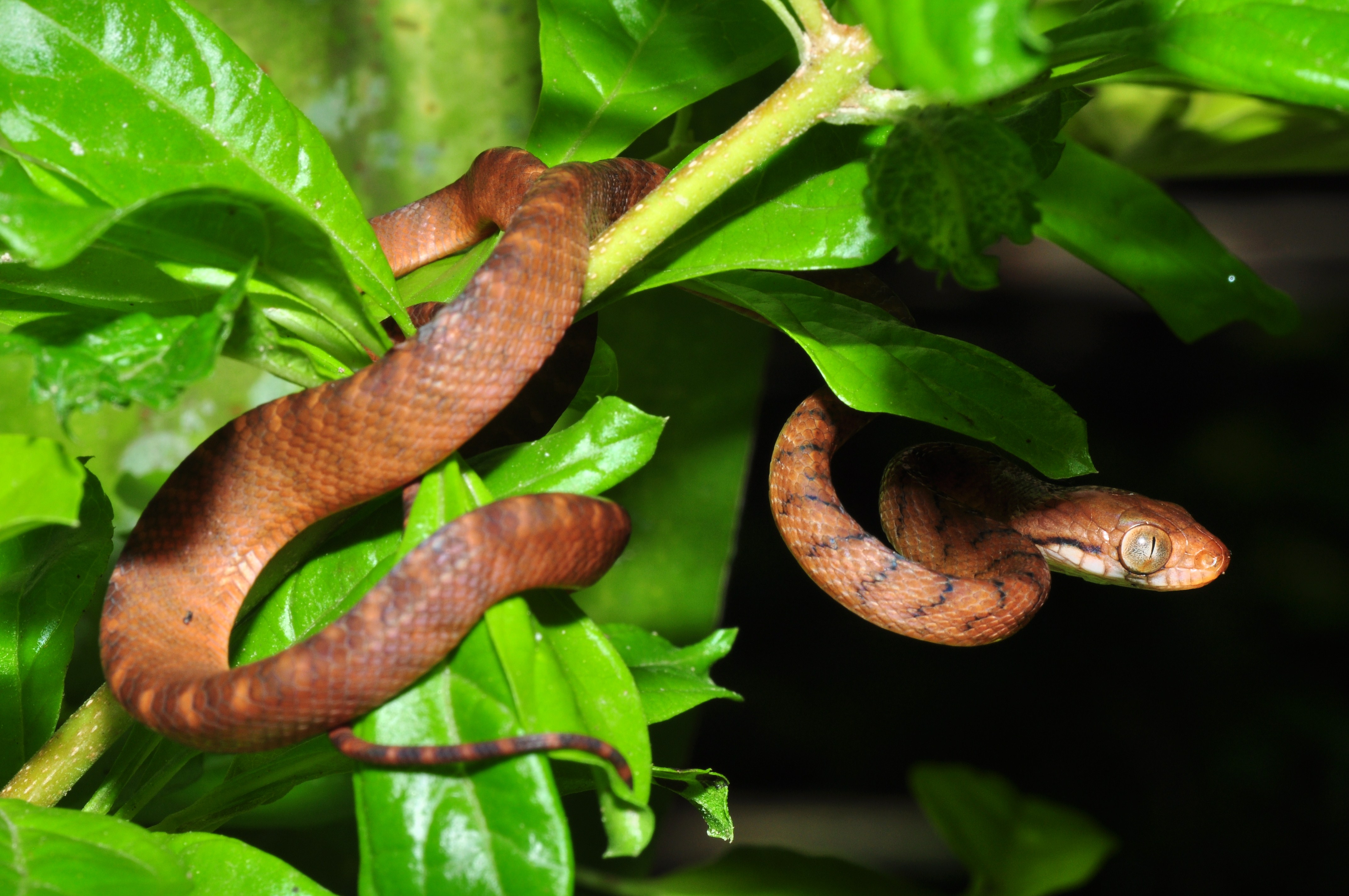
The brown tree snake (Boiga irregularis), an invasive species in the United States

Invasive species pose a crucial threat to many native habitats and species in the United States and impose high costs on agriculture, forestry, and recreation. An invasive species refers to an organism that is not native to a specific region and poses significant economic and environmental threats to its new habitat. The term "invasive species" can also refer to feral species or introduced diseases. Some introduced species, such as the dandelion, do not cause significant economic or ecological damage and are not widely considered as invasive. Economic damages from invasive species and control costs are estimated at $120 billion per year.

The main geomorphological impacts of invasive plants include bioconstruction and bioprotection.

Degrees of ecological impacts by introduced faunas that can potentially compensate for extinct native animals (especially megafauna) and treatments of these animals have long been subjects to discussions most notably mustangs and burros, while contributions by other species (Note: Such as feral cattle, feral goats, Barbary sheep, feral pigs, oryxes, nilgai and other antelopes, deer, Himalayan tahr, capybaras, and so on.) to the native ecosystems are also debatable.

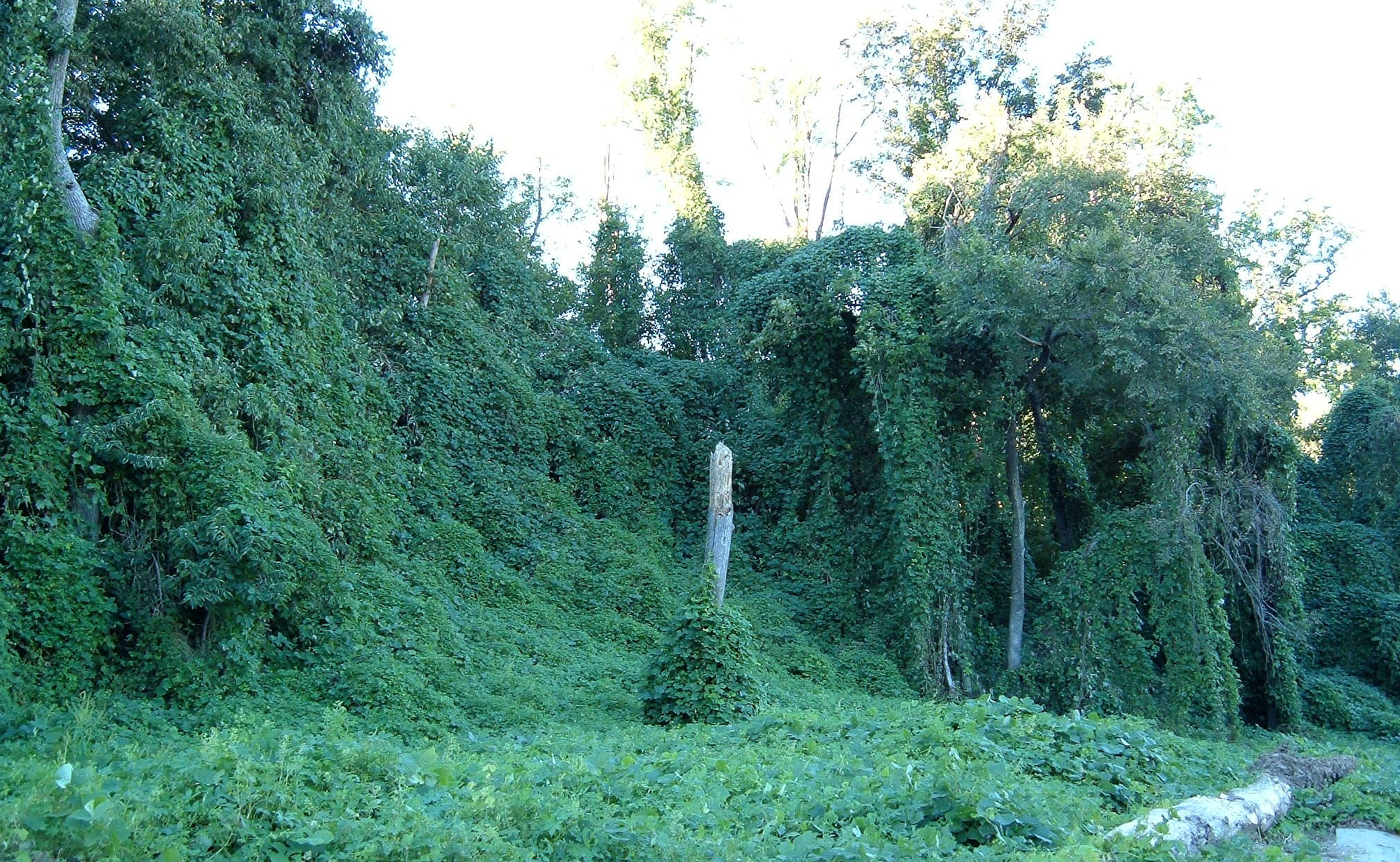
Kudzu, a Japanese vine species invasive in the southeast United States, growing in Atlanta, Georgia

== Notable invasive species ==
Picture	Common name	Species name	Introduced	Control measures	Notes
	Kudzu	Pueraria lobata	Southern U.S.	Mowing, herbicides, conservation grazing	Known as "the vine that ate the South", forms dense monocultures that outcompete native ground cover and forest trees. It can grow up to one foot per day. For more details, see Kudzu in the United States.
	Common tumbleweed	Kali tragus	Throughout North America	Managed grazing	Introduced through imported flaxseed from Russia that was contaminated with Kali seeds. Although invasive, it is used in Westerns to symbolize frontier areas of the United States.
	Privet	Ligustrum spp.	Southeastern U.S.	Mechanical removal, herbicides	Highly invasive in urban areas and forested areas of the southeastern U.S.
	Zebra mussel	Dreissena polymorpha	Great Lakes, U.S. waterways & lakes	Ballast water transport bans, manual removal from clogged pipes	Initially spread by ballast tanks of oceangoing vessels on the Great Lakes, now spread lake-to-lake by trailer-drawn boats. It may be a source of avian botulism in the Great Lakes region.
	Common starling	Sturnus vulgaris	Contiguous United States	Hunting, trapping	Introduced in 19th century as part of an effort to bring all species mentioned in Shakespeare's works to the United States. 100 birds released in Central Park have spread across the entire mainland U.S.
	Brown tree snake	Boiga irregularis	Guam	Dog-sniffing of incoming ships, paracetamol as poison	Has reached densities on Guam of up to 100 snakes per hectare, caused extinction on Guam of at least 12 bird species.
	Burmese pythons in Florida	Python bivittatus	Everglades	Hunting season created	Introduced via released or escaped pet snakes.
	Africanized bee	Apis mellifera hybrid	Southwestern U.S.	Cold weather has limited spread	Hybrid of African and European honeybees created in Brazil in the 1950s, described as "killer bees." While individually no more venomous than European honeybees, they attack with particular violence and usually involve large numbers of stings, which can be fatal to humans and other animals.
	Asian carp	Multiple Cyprinidae	Mississippi River and tributaries	Rotenone poison, electric barriers	Have the habit of jumping out of the water, which can injure boaters. Introduced to eat algae in fish ponds in the Southern U.S., escaped during flood events.
	Emerald ash borer	Agrilus planipennis	Eastern U.S.	Culling infected stands, bans on firewood transport	Threatens to reduce or eliminate the ash lumber industry of U.S. severely, worth an estimated value of $25.1 billion per year.
	Hemlock woolly adelgid	Adelges tsugae	Eastern U.S.	Insecticide treatment	Could kill most eastern hemlocks in the U.S. within the next decade.
	Multiflora rose	Rosa multiflora	Eastern U.S.	Manual removal, herbicides	Introduced for erosion control and promoted as a "living fence" to attract wildlife, now competes with native understory plants.
	Spiny waterflea	Bythotrephes longimanus	Great Lakes	Ballast water transport bans	Competes with native fish for prey, and its spines prevent many native fish from eating it as prey.
	Northern Snakehead	Channa argus	East Coast fresh water	Possession of a live specimen is illegal in many U.S. states.	Invasive snakeheads can cause major ecological damage because they are apex predators.
	Giant African land snail	Lissachatina fulica	Florida	Pest control	This invasive species was smuggled into Florida from Africa. Since they need calcium to build their shells, they attach themselves to concrete, which in many cases is house foundations, weakening house structures.
	Lionfish	Pterois	Southern U.S.	Lionfish derbies	Lionfish compete for food with native fish species. They have no natural predators because of their venomous spines.
	Cane toad	Rhinella marina	Florida and Hawaii	Pest control	They pose as threats to animals since they are toxic.
	Nile crocodile	Crocodylus niloticus	Florida	Monitoring and removal	Several specimens have been recently captured in South Florida, though no signs have been found that the population is reproducing in the wild.
	Rusty crayfish	Orconectes rusticus	Across the states	Intensive trapping, boat and equipment cleaning, bait restrictions	The larger size and aggressive nature of rusty crayfish that have been introduced to a body of water makes it harder for them to be preyed upon by native species of fish, which are not accustomed to crayfish fighting back against them.
	Spotted lanternfly	Lycorma delicatula	Northeastern and Mid-Atlantic U.S.	Pest control	Highly invasive, with potential to spread across much of the Midwest and Western U.S.
	Japanese beetle	Popillia japonica	Northeastern, Southern and Midwestern U.S.	Poison, diseases, parasites.	Pest of roughly 300 species of plants, rapid spread.
A Pyrus Calleryana tree depicted in full bloom with a dense canopy of white flowers.	Callery Pear	Pyrus calleryana	Throughout Eastern United States	Physical removal and targeted herbicibe.	Originally brought to the United States from Asia as an ornamental tree. They flourish in low-quality soils and also tend to be pest free. They also release chemicals that can affect the soil and make it harder for native plants to grow.

For a more in-depth example, Zebra mussels (Dreissena polymorpha), like many other invasive species, are not native to the United States and can cause significant damage to ecosystems and severely harm native aquatic wildlife, such as fish and other freshwater shellfish.

Zebra mussels (Deissena polymarpha) are a species of shell fish that originated and are native to the Caspian and Black seas of Europe and the western part of Russia. These invasive species of shellfish made their way into the United States and were discovered here in the U.S during the 1980s. Zebra mussels are known for outcompeting native fish species (mainly other shellfish) and can prevent those fish from absorbing nutrients and reproduction. Another problem humans face is (Biofouling), which occurs when mussels attach themselves to surfaces using Byssal threads, protein-based roots. This can damage property by clogging vehicles, pipes, and other systems. Given their appearance, these mussels are depicted as having light brown coloration with black stripes, hence their name, and have a very small, D-shaped shell. They are typically not that big, growing to roughly one-quarter to one and one-half inches in length, possibly two inches. Their size (like other mussel species) is usually dependent on age, and they may also possess stripes that are both yellow and brown.

== Economic impact ==
The economic impacts of invasive species can be difficult to estimate, especially when an invasive species does not affect economically important native species. This is partly because of the difficulty in determining the non-use value of native habitats damaged by invasive species and the incomplete knowledge of the effects of all invasive species present in the U.S. Estimates of the damage caused by well-known species can also vary. The Office of Technology Assessment (OTA) has estimated the zebra mussel's economic effects at $300,000 per year, while a United States Army Corps of Engineers study put the figure at $1 billion per year. The United States government spends an estimated $1 billion annually to recover from the invasive Formosan termite, investing $1 billion of this budget in areas surrounding New Orleans, a major port city. Estimates of total yearly costs controlling invasive species range from $1.1 billion to $137 billion per year.

In 1993, the OTA estimated that a total of $100 million was invested annually in invasive-species aquatic weed control in the U.S. Introduced rats cause more than $19 billion per year in damages, exotic fish cause up to $5.4 billion annually, and the total costs of introduced weeds are estimated at around $27 billion annually. The total damage to the native bird population from invasive species is approximately $17 billion per year. Approximately $2.1 billion in forest products are lost each year to invasive plant pathogens, and a conservative estimate of the losses to livestock from exotic microbes and parasites was $9 billion per year in 2001.

== Government policies and management efforts ==
The federal government has historically promoted the introduction and widespread distribution of species that have become invasive, including multiflora rose, kudzu, and others, for a variety of reasons. Before the 20th century, numerous species were imported and released without government oversight, such as the gypsy moth and house sparrow. Over 50% of the flora recognized as invasive or noxious weeds were deliberately introduced to the United States by either government policy or individuals. Current government policy can be broadly separated into two categories: preventing the entry of a potential invasive species and controlling the spread of species already present. This is carried out by different government agencies, depending on what types of damage a species can cause.

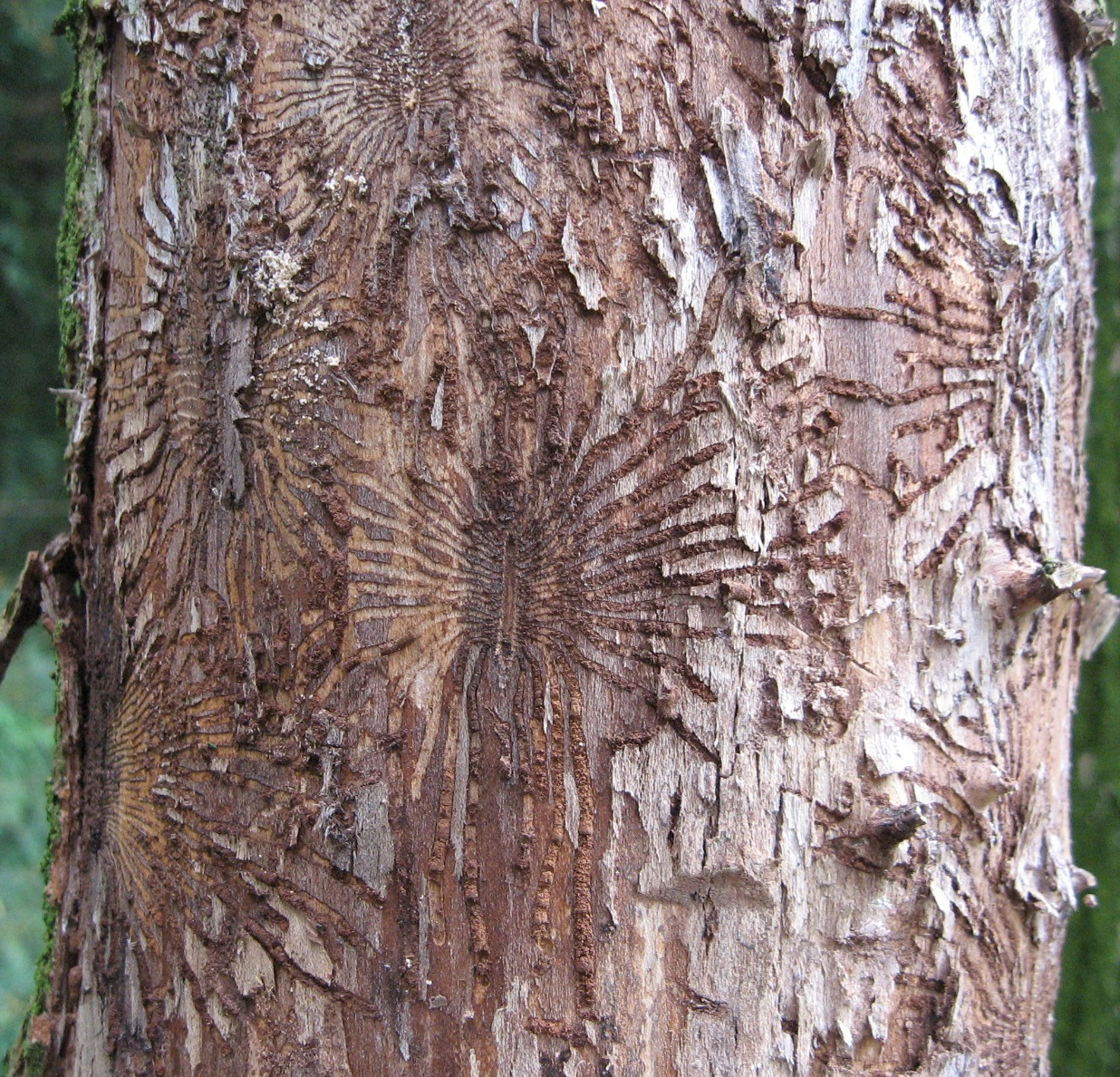
Dutch elm disease was introduced accidentally through imported lumber in 1928.

=== Regulations ===
The Lacey Act of 1900 was originally designed to protect game wildlife. Its role has expanded to prohibit parties from bringing non-native species into the country that could become invasive. The Lacey Act (as 18 U.S.C. 42) gives the United States Fish and Wildlife Service (FWS) the power to list a species as "injurious" and regulate or prohibit its entry into the U.S. The Alien Species Prevention and Enforcement Act of 1992 makes it illegal to transport through the mail a plant or animal deemed injurious. The FWS primarily focuses on invasive species likely to threaten sensitive habitats or endangered species.

The United States Department of Agriculture (USDA) is also involved in preventing the introduction of invasive species, largely through the Animal and Plant Health Inspection Service, or APHIS. APHIS was originally tasked with preventing damage to agriculture and forestry from alien species, pests, or diseases, but has had its mission expanded to include preventing invasive species spread as well. This includes identifying potential pests and diseases, assisting in international and domestic eradication efforts, and the Smuggling Interdiction and Trade Compliance Program, designed initially to deal with illegally imported produce, but now tasked with preventing the entry of exotic pests, diseases, and potentially invasive species. APHIS also enforces bans against interstate transport of pests, diseases, and species listed as injurious, noxious weeds, or nuisance species. An example of the USDA banning imports is the ban on fresh mangosteen fruit due to concerns about fruit flies from Southeast Asia. This ban originally allowed only frozen or canned fruit, but now allows for fresh irradiated fruit to enter.

=== Control ===
Many invasive species are spread inadvertently by human activities, such as seeds stuck to clothing, mud transported by firewood, or ballast water. The government has instituted several policies to address the various pathways by which the invasive species may spread. For example, quarantines on a federal and state level exist for firewood across the Eastern United States in an attempt to halt the spread of the emerald ash borer, gypsy moth, oak wilt, and others. Transporting firewood out of quarantine zones can result in a fine of up to $1 million and 25 years in jail, but punishments are usually much lower.

The techniques available for controlling the spread of invasive species can be broadly defined into six categories:

1. Cultural practices, including controlled burns and timbering. An example of this in action is the use of prescribed burns in the Everglades to control Melaleuca quinquenervia trees. The burns destroy Melaleuca but not native species, which have adapted to wildfires, which were common but are now suppressed.
2. Interference with dispersal, which may include fencing, reducing accidental seed transport, and the construction of barriers, such as the electric barriers to prevent the spread of Asian carp.
3. Mechanical removal, including mowing, harvesting, manual removal, trapping, and culling. Many invasive plants, such as garlic mustard, can regrow quickly after mowing and must be removed by the roots or chemically.
4. Chemical control, which may include the use of approved pesticides or herbicides, or vaccines to control invasive diseases. Sea lampreys in the Great Lakes have had their numbers significantly reduced by a lampricide that kills larvae, which hatch in streams, before they can enter the lakes. The lampricide is responsible for reducing the sea lamprey population in the Great Lakes from over 3 million in the 1950s to around 450,000 today, which has potentially rescued several Great Lakes fisheries.
5. Biological control, which can involve the release of specific predators/herbivores, parasites, or diseases designed to control an invasive species without damaging native ones. One example of this is the city of Chattanooga's use of goats to control kudzu growing on mountain ridges. The goats, guarded from predators by llamas, eat the vine often enough to starve the roots, slowly killing the plant. This method is much cheaper than the repeated mowing or herbicidal spraying that would otherwise be necessary. Goats reach areas that are inaccessible to machines and have multi-chambered stomachs which coupled with their grazing technique mean that goats leave few seeds behind to sprout again.
6. Interference with reproduction, which can include the release of mating-disrupting pheromones or the release of sterile males. Field tests are underway to study the control of sea lampreys in the Great Lakes using pheromone-baited traps in streams, in addition to current chemical controls. When female sea lampreys return to the stream to breed, they are drawn to the traps and captured, preventing reproduction.

An integrated pest management (IPM) approach, as defined by the National Invasive Species Council, uses scientific data and population monitoring to help determine the most efficient control strategy, which is usually a combination of several of the methods listed above. Agencies are encouraged to use an adaptive management strategy, involving regular reviews of the efficiency of their policies and conducting research into better methods.

=== Inter-department cooperation ===
No single government agency oversees invasive species control. For example, eight agencies (divisions) of the USDA work on invasive species issues, including the Agricultural Research Service, Animal and Plant Health Inspection Service, Cooperative State Research, Education, and Extension Service, Economic Research Service, Farm Service Agency, Foreign Agricultural Service, United States Forest Service, and the Natural Resources Conservation Service. Different agencies are responsible for different invasive species. For example, policies aimed at controlling the emerald ash borer are undertaken by the USDA because national forests, the body coordinating emerald ash borer control efforts, are within the USDA's purview. The National Invasive Species Council (NISC) was created by executive order in 1999 and charged with promoting efficiency and coordination between the numerous federal invasive species prevention and control policies. The NISC is co-chaired by the secretaries of the three federal departments responsible for invasive species control: the Department of the Interior, the Department of Commerce, and the USDA. Many state efforts use a similar council model to coordinate state agencies.

== Education and outreach ==
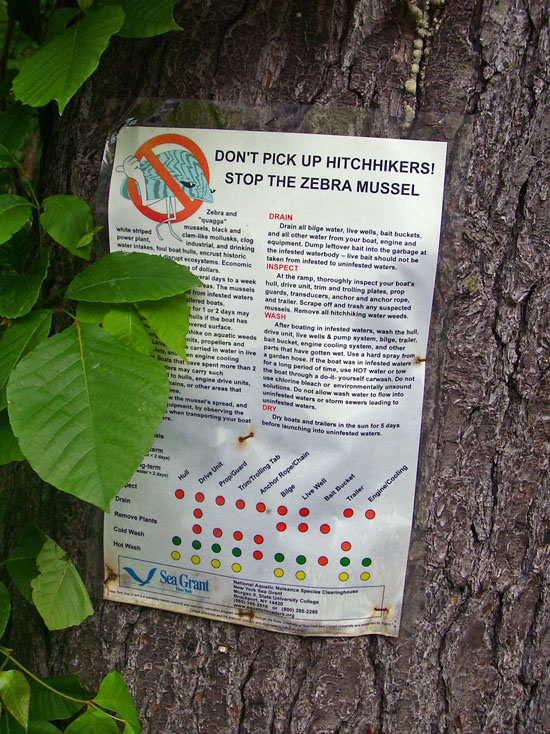
Warning signs like these are a first-line defense against the expansion of easily-spread invasive species, such as the zebra mussel.

Many of the policies used to contain invasive species, such as firewood transport bans or cleaning shoes and clothes after hiking, are effective only when the general public knows of their existence and importance. As a result, numerous programs have been implemented to inform the public about invasive species. This includes placing signs at boat ramps, campsites, state borders, hiking trails, and numerous other locations to remind visitors of policies and potential fines for violating them. There are also numerous government programs aimed at educating children, as well as promoting volunteer efforts at removal and the many ways citizens can prevent the spread of invasive species.

== Invasive species by area ==
=== Great Lakes ===
Current efforts in the Great Lakes ecoregion focus on measures that prevent the introduction of invasive species. As a major transport area, the Great Lakes have already seen a number of invasive species established. In 1998, the United States Coast Guard, in accordance with the National Invasive Species Act of 1996, established a voluntary ballast water management program. In 2004, this voluntary program became mandatory for every ship entering U.S.-controlled waters. Current measures are among the most stringent in the world and require ships entering from outside the Exclusive Economic Zone to flush ballast water in open seas or retain their ballast water for the length of their stay in the Great Lakes. Failure to comply with the U.S. Coast Guard's regulations can result in a class C felony.

Another preventive measure in the Great Lakes region is the electrified barrier in the Chicago Sanitary and Ship Canal. The barrier is meant to keep Asian carp from reaching Lake Michigan and the other Great Lakes. On December 2, 2010, Michigan, Ohio, Pennsylvania, and Wisconsin were denied their request to force the canal's closure by the United States district court. The closing of the canal would have once again separated Lake Michigan and the Mississippi river system. States argued that the canal and the Asian carp in it posed a risk to $7 billion in industry. Currently, the electric barrier is the only preventative measure, and some question its effectiveness, particularly following the discovery of Asian carp DNA past the barrier. The discovery of the DNA of Asian carp could be linked to live bait used around the Great Lakes region. The method for identifying the DNA is called environmental DNA (eDNA) surveillance. This method uses DNA that is left in the environment to identify species in low abundances.

In June 2022, the Illinois Department of Natural Resources announced a campaign to rebrand Asian carp as Copi. The Copi renaming is a part of a Federal and state initiative to get the public to eat the invasive fish, decrease its numbers in Midwestern waterways, and prevent its introduction to the Great Lakes.

Logo for Copi the new name for Asian carp

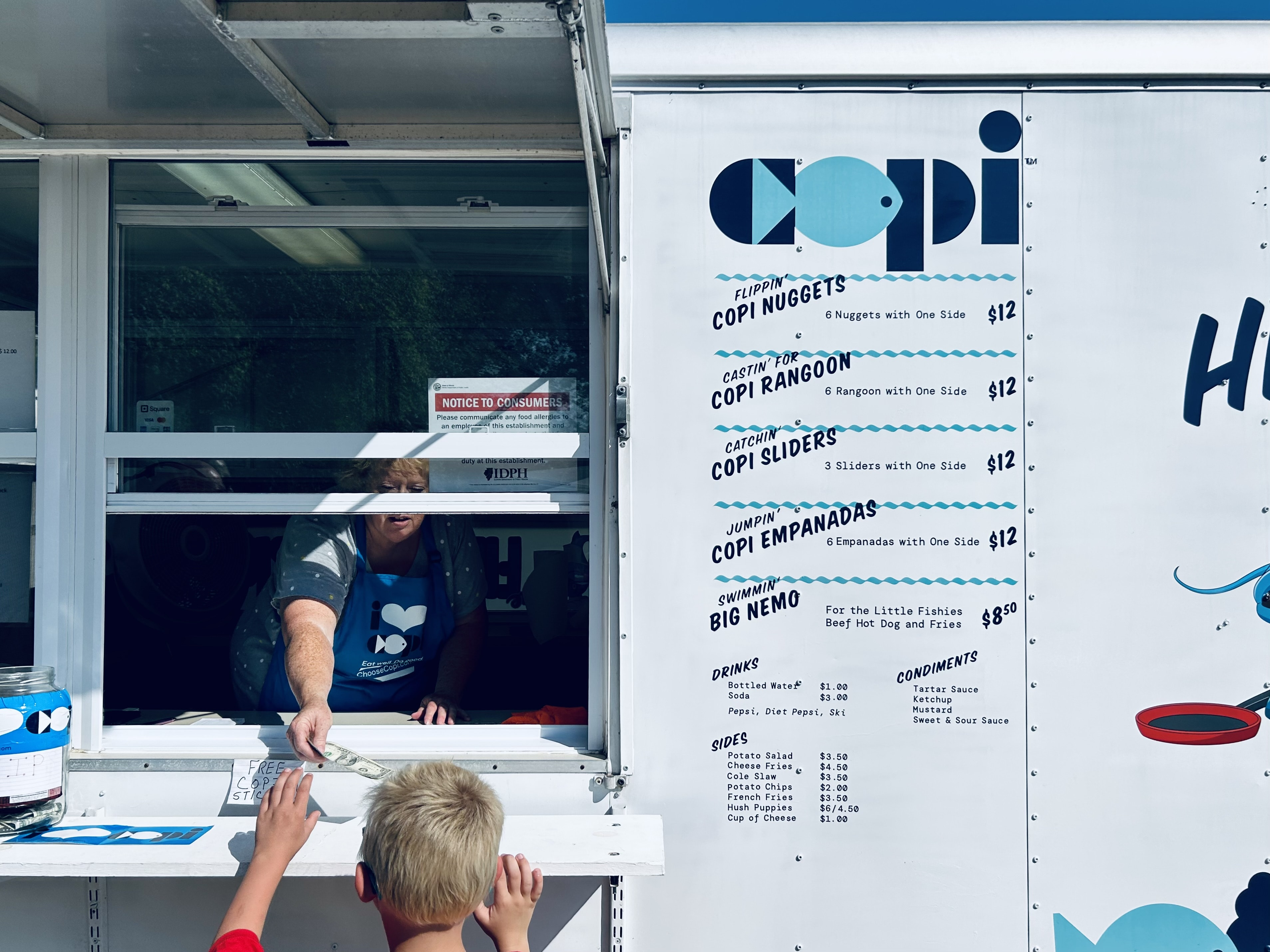
The Copi food truck at the 2023 Illinois State Fair in Springfield Illinois

The federal United States Environmental Protection Agency—the Great Lakes Restoration Initiative - is funding the Copi rebrand of Asian carp. Within two months of the rebranding, approximately 1.1 million pounds (500,000 kg) of the fish had been sold in seven states.

=== Rocky Mountains ===
The USDA Rocky Mountain Research Station has a specific Invasive Species Working Group to do the research about invasive species in the Rocky Mountain region. The Invasive Species Working Group focuses on four key areas: prediction and prevention; early detection and rapid response; control and management; restoration and rehabilitation. Specific approaches include prioritizing invasive species problems, increased collaboration among agencies regarding those problems, and accountability for the responsible use of the limited resources available for invasive control.

Invasive species of particular concern in the Rocky Mountain region include: cheatgrass; leafy spurge; tansy ragwort; spotted knapweed; bufflegrass; saltcedar; white pine blister rust; armillaria root rot; introduced trout species; golden algae; spruce aphid; and banded elm bark beetle.

=== Colorado River ===
Already stressed by water management and damming, the Colorado River is losing its big-river fish community to the combined effects of predation and competition by introduced non-native fishes. This fish community includes four large fish species listed as endangered by the U.S. Fish and Wildlife Service. One of these, the Colorado pikeminnow, is the largest minnow native to North America and is known for its spectacular freshwater spawning migrations and homing ability. Despite a massive recovery effort, its numbers are in decline. Hampered by a loss of about 80% of its habitat, the young of this once-abundant fish are overwhelmed in its nursery habitat by invasive small fishes – such as red shiner and fathead minnow – whose numbers are as high as 90% of the standing stocks. Its juveniles and adults now must also compete with and are preyed upon by introduced northern pike, channel and flathead catfishes, largemouth and smallmouth basses, common carp, and other fishes. However, the listing of these non native sport fish as invasive is controversial, as the fish are popular among anglers, who criticize the science used by government agencies and assert that non-native species are largely a scapegoat in the decline of endemic Colorado River basin fish. Instead, they blame changes to the riparian environment primarily on dams and water diversions.

=== Florida Everglades ===
In 1994, the Everglades Forever Act of 1994 was passed to help control Florida's water supply, recreational areas, and diverse flora and fauna. In addition to control and prevention measures, the act also calls for efforts to monitor the distribution of known invasive species.

One invasive species occurring in the Everglades that can have serious consequences is the Burmese python. Between 2000 and 2010, approximately 1,300 of the snakes were removed from the Everglades. Currently the National Park Service is researching control measures for the Burmese python to limit the species effects on the delicate Everglades ecosystem.

=== Pacific Northwest ===
In the Pacific Northwest, non-native invasive species (NIS) pose significant threats to native ecosystems, biodiversity, and the stability of soil and hydrologic systems. NIS disrupt hydroelectric dams and irrigation systems, increase the spread of wildlife diseases, increase wildfire intensity and frequency, and cost the region's economy billions of dollars.

Invasive species are spreading in the Pacific Northwest at unprecedented rates due to high levels of trade and tourism, as well as global climate change.

=== Gulf Coast ===
The Gulf South has historically been particularly susceptible to the introduction of non-native invasive species. The porous nature of this region and the numerous ports within it contribute, in large part, to the introduction of non-native aquatic species. This region is home to one of the nation's most active ports (the Port of New Orleans), as well as numerous other large ports in Houston, Mobile, and Gulfport. The Mississippi River provides access to 14,500 miles of connecting waterways throughout North America through the Mississippi Delta by way of the Port of New Orleans, providing for a path of little resistance for non-native species to disperse throughout the region. Among the most notable species introduced to the Gulf Coast by way of ocean-going vessels docking in these ports are: the Formosan termite arriving by way of wooden pallets unloaded in Houston during the 1940s, fire ants arriving by way of soil shipments from South America from the 1910s to 1940s, Asian tiger mosquitoes arriving through Houston during the 1980s by way of stagnant water trapped in used tires.

On the coast itself, the aquatic plant species of primary concern is the Salvinia (both giant and common). This plant was listed as a Federal Noxious Weed in 1981. Before this classification, it arrived in America from Brazil to be used as a novelty plant in aquatic gardens/aquariums. These plants grow entirely or partially submerged in water, and their areas of influence include wetlands, lakes, rivers, estuaries, coastal zones, irrigation systems, hydroelectric systems, and aquaculture facilities. In areas where this plant is allowed to flourish unchecked, it often engrosses entire riverways and lakes. For example, Lake Bistineau and Caney Lakes in Webster Parish, Louisiana were entirely choked out by this invasive aquatic weed. This plant has an incredible capacity to dominate competing organisms within its ecosystem. It owes this status to its short reproductive cycle, high genetic variability, and the fact that it can survive in nearly any type of aquatic environment.

The most problematic terrestrial plant species in this region is the Chinese Tallow tree, which was introduced to the United States in the 1700s for cultivation in commercial nurseries. The plant was primarily cultivated for its seeds, which produce a waxy substance used in soapmaking. This tree has spread throughout the Southeastern United States, from East Texas to North Carolina, but it is especially prolific in the Gulf South Region. This species is particularly damaging because its root systems alter the soil's chemical balance, which in turn changes the composition and structure of the native ecosystem's plant life. These trees have expanded rapidly throughout the Gulf Coast region. Because they outcompete much of the native vegetation, they threaten these areas by reducing diversity, inevitably leading to a dangerous monoculture. Additionally, when found in wetland or marsh communities (such as those throughout the Gulf Coast), this tree has been shown to affect amphibian and reptile populations adversely.

The lone mammalian species threatening the Gulf Coast is a large rodent known as the nutria. This species was brought to Louisiana from South America in hopes of bolstering a domestic fur trade. However, enough of these animals escaped and made their homes in the thousands of coastal bayous and waterways, becoming a problem. These rats annually damage 100,000 acres of coastal wetlands with their ravenous appetite for aquatic plants, making this already vulnerable region even more susceptible to coastal erosion. Additionally, they are notorious for destroying crop yields. Nutria rats have been the target of one of the most well-known and effective control programs ever utilized by environmental protection agencies. The state of Louisiana offers $6 per Nutria tail delivered to collection centers run by local wildlife and fisheries authorities. The projected annual goal of this program is to harvest 400,000 nutria annually.

== Restoration efforts in the Pacific Northwest ==
Non-native invasive species may be as disruptive to the Pacific Northwest as climate change, and prevention and management efforts are acutely underfunded.

Since the Pacific Northwest was one of the last regions of the United States to be fully colonized by Europeans, a greater proportion of native ecosystems remains intact than elsewhere on the continent.

Major conservation efforts are directed towards native Pacific Salmon because they provide substantial benefits to countless species and to the overall health and functioning of coastal ecosystems. Although hydroelectric dams, hatcheries, harvest, and habitat loss dominate the discourse on salmon population decrease in the Pacific Northwest, non-native invasive species (NIS) may have a greater impact than all of these four aspects combined through the mechanisms of predation, competition, infection, and habitat modification.

The removal of non-native invasive species (NIS) from Pacific Northwest forests can increase the abundance and diversity of native herbs and woody plants over a short time frame, without human intervention, through passive forest recovery mechanisms.

Soil pathogens pose a significant barrier to ecological restoration efforts across multiple habitats in the Pacific Northwest as non-native invasive species are notably less vulnerable to pathogen attack than native ones.

Specific non-native invasive species can actually assist conservation efforts by providing shelter and food for rare species, performing beneficial ecological services, serving as functional replacements for extinct species, and exhibiting greater resilience to land and climate changes.

=== Climate change ===
The lack of knowledge about the present and future effects of climate change on the biota of the Pacific Northwest is vast; only a sprinkling of studies address this issue.

Ecologists hypothesize that the effects of climate change on NIS in the Pacific Northwest are likely to include: (1) different introduction modalities, (2) altered impacts of existing NIS, (3) different distribution patterns of existing NIS, (4) increased biological invasions, and (5) altered efficacy of current NIS management techniques.

== Invasive species by state ==
=== California ===
California has created a policy system for invasive species, including the Invasive Species Council of California (ISCC), the California Invasive Species Advisory Committee (CISAC), and the California Invasive Plant Council (Cal-IPC), a nonprofit organization. The ISCC represents the highest level of leadership and authority in state government regarding invasive species. The ISCC is an inter-agency council that helps coordinate and ensure that state activities regarding invasive species are complementary, cost-efficient, environmentally sound, and effective. CISAC advises the ISCC and created the California list of invasive species. California has many diverse ecoregions, and numerous endemic species that are at risk from invasive species.

=== Florida ===
Invasive species in Florida currently make up more than 26% of the animal population and a full one-third of the flora population. In 2015, the presence of the invasive land planarian Platydemus manokwari was recorded from several gardens in Miami. Platydemus manokwari is a predator of land snails and is considered a danger to endemic snails wherever it has been introduced.

=== Hawaii ===
The Hawaii Invasive Species Council coordinates measures to prevent the introduction and spread of invasive species. Currently, the council is broken into five committees, which focus on different areas of invasive species control. These focus areas are: prevention, management of established pests, increased public awareness, research and technology, and monetary resources.

Currently, Hawaii requires inspection of all transport of plants, animals, and microorganisms. This includes transports from the mainland in addition to transports occurring between islands. Travelers are required to fill out a declaration form for each journey. Failure to declare these transports can result in up to one year imprisonment or a $250,000 fine. Many potential invasives or carriers for invasives require permits and quarantine periods before entry to the state is allowed.

In addition, there are other preventive measures, such as a hotline for reporting sightings of known potential invaders, like the brown tree snake.

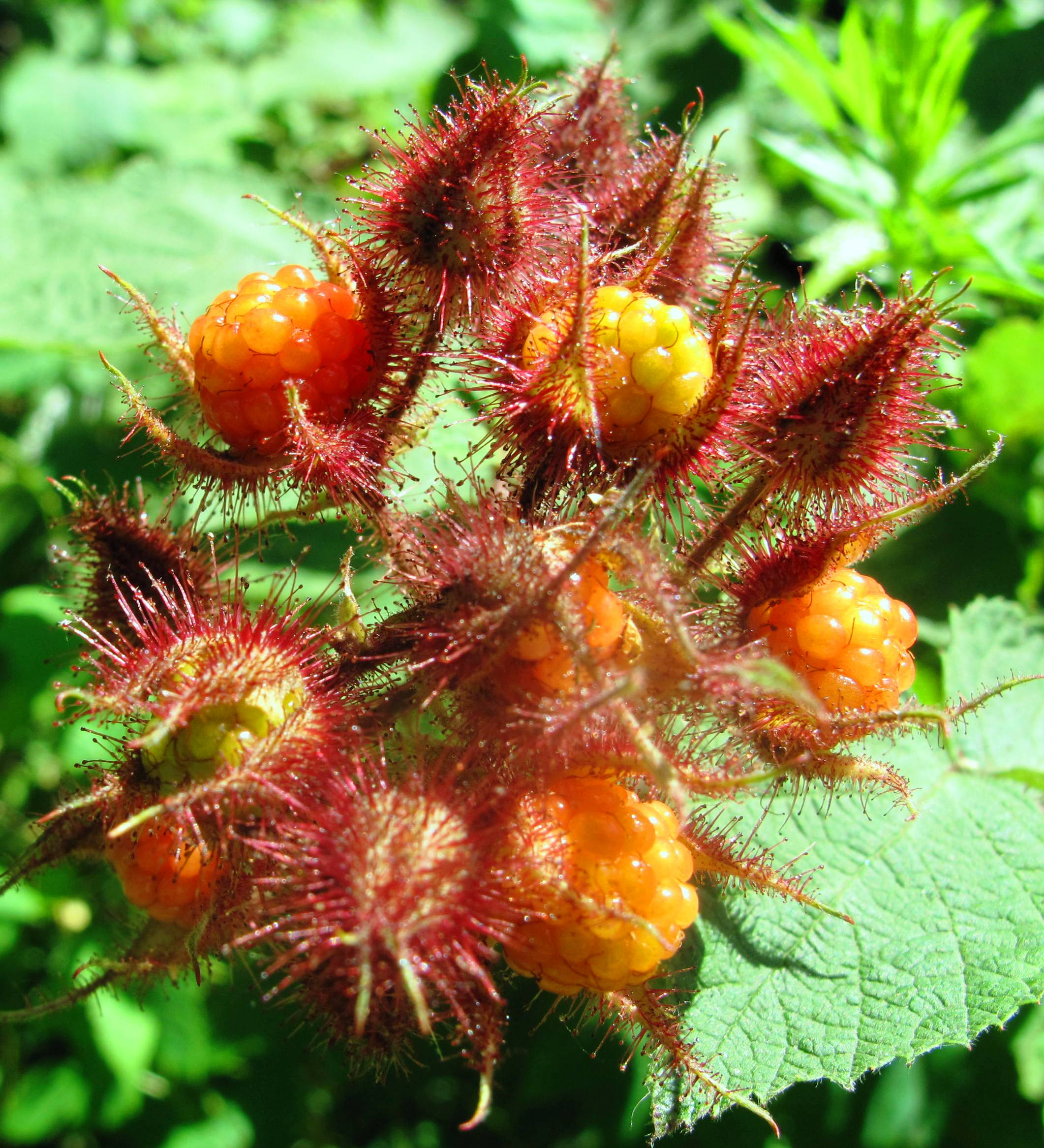
Invasive wineberry found in Rye, New York

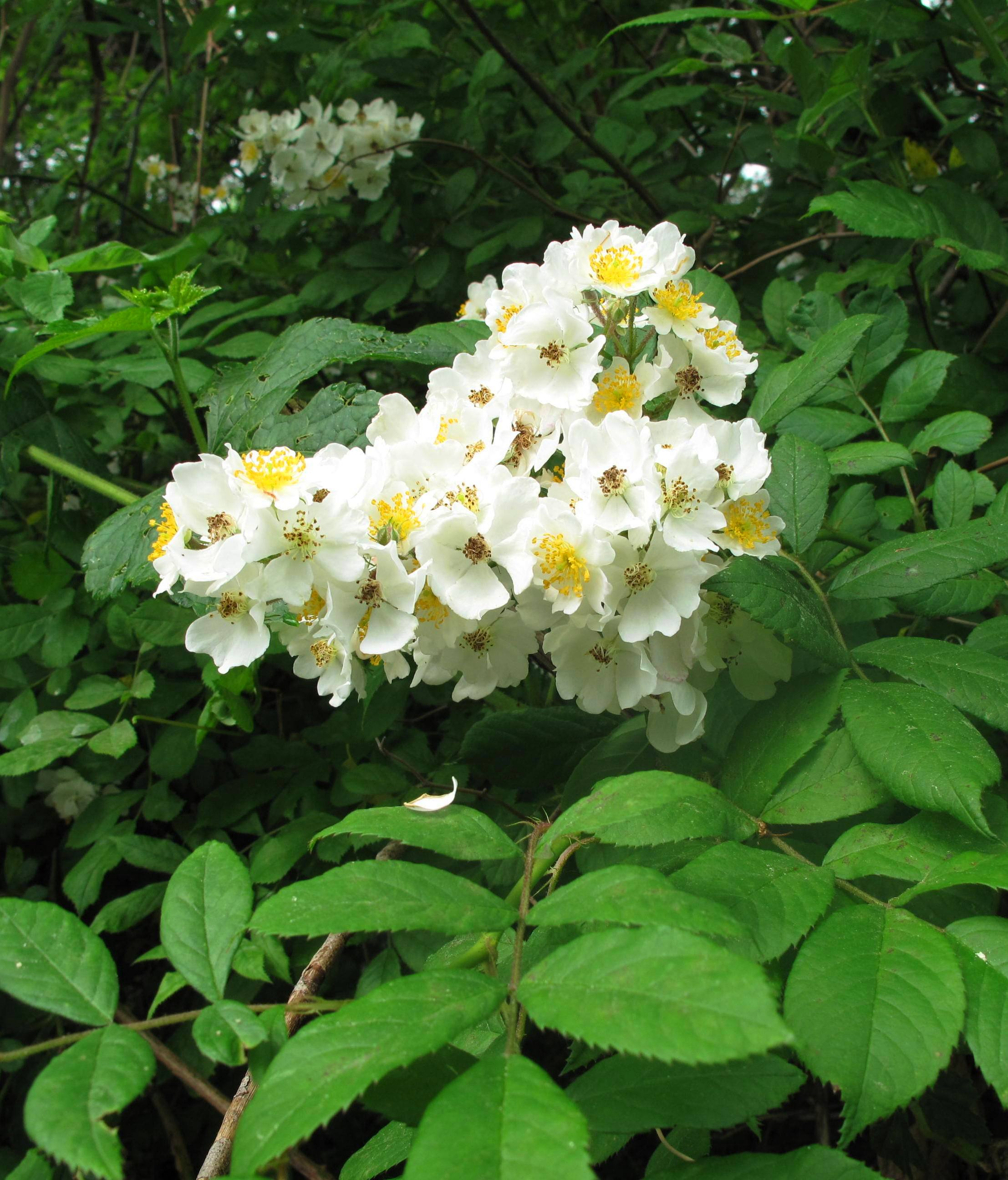
Multiflora rose closeup, Rye, New York

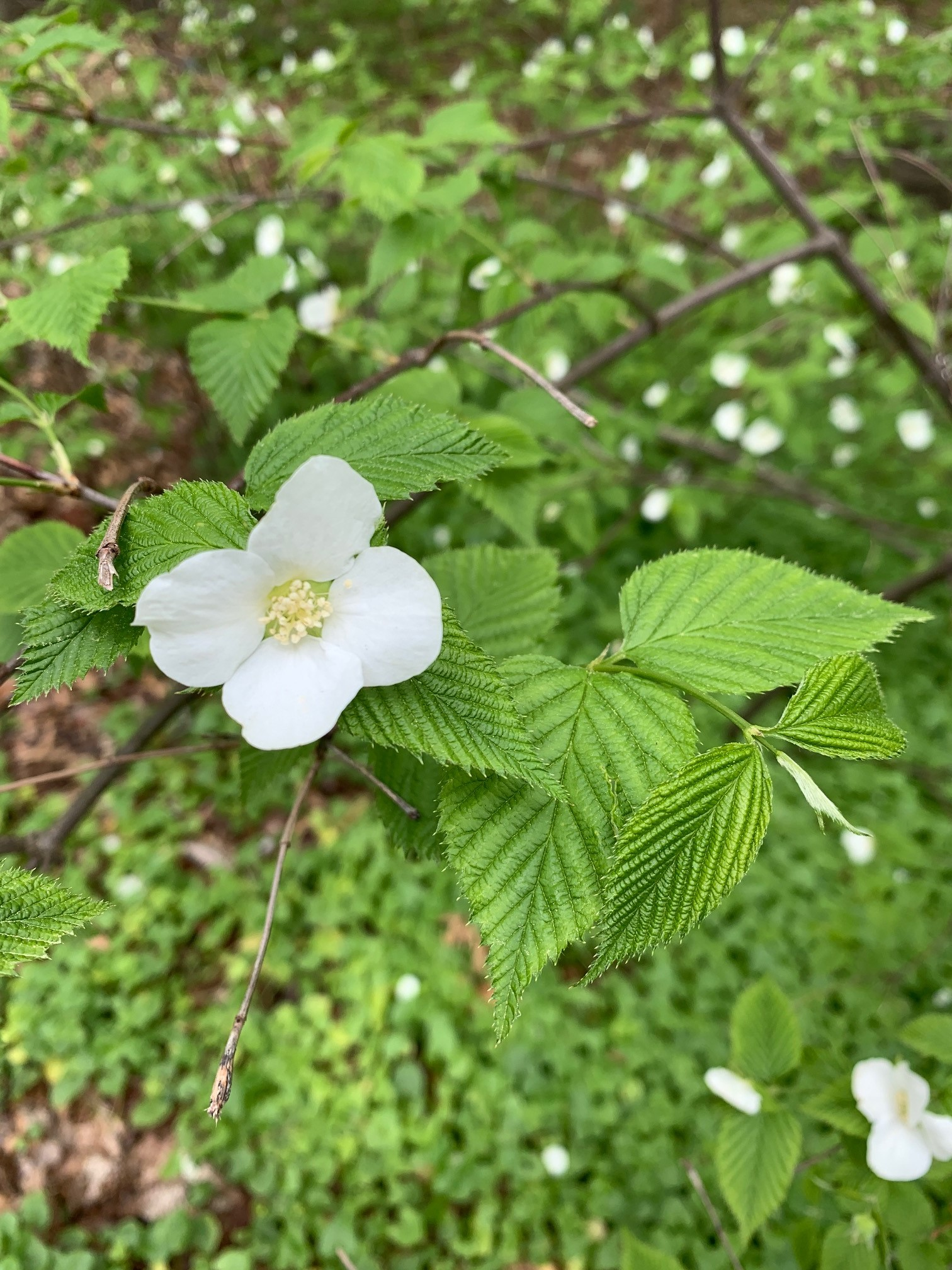
Jetbead flowering in May, Rye, New York

=== Idaho ===
The Idaho Department of Agriculture has around 300 introduced or exotic species listed, of which 36 are classified as noxious weeds. The legal designation of noxious weed for a plant in Idaho can use these four criteria:

1. It is present in, but not native to, the state-province-ecosystem.
2. It is potentially more harmful than beneficial to that area.
3. Its management, control, or eradication is economically and physically feasible.
4. The potential adverse impact of it exceeds the cost of its control.

Some of the plants on Idaho's noxious weed list that are harmful or poisonous are:

- Leafy spurge (Euphorbia virgata): native to Eurasia. It has milky latex throughout its parts that can cause blisters and dermatitis in humans, cattle, and horses, and may cause permanent blindness if rubbed into the eye.
- Poison hemlock (Conium maculatum): native to Europe. It contains highly poisonous alkaloids, toxic to all classes of domesticated grazing animals. Agonopterix alstroemeriana is used as a biological control agent for the plant, and, in high larval numbers, can kill large areas of the poisonous plant.
- Russian knapweed (Acroptilon repens): native to the Caucasus in southern Russia and Asia. It causes chewing disease in horses.
- Tansy ragwort: native to Eurasia. All parts are poisonous; they cause liver damage in cattle and horses, while affecting sheep to a lesser extent.
- Toothed spurge (Euphorbia dentata): native further east and south, but not native to Idaho. A milky latex exists in all parts of the plant that can produce blisters and dermatitis in humans, cattle, and horses. It may cause permanent blindness if rubbed into the eye.
- Yellow starthistle (Centaurea solstitialis): native to the Mediterranean basin area and Asia. It causes death and chewing disease in horses.
- Yellow toadflax (Linaria vulgaris): native to Europe. It contains a poisonous glucoside that may be harmful to livestock.

=== Louisiana ===
New Orleans, the "gateway to the Mississippi", is a porous port city with rich soils. In turn, many aquatic plants are introduced to the region, making Louisiana the state with the second largest list of invasive aquatic species, second to Florida.

The "Dirty Dozen" details a list of the United States' most destructive invasive species. Of the twelve, four are identified in the state, including the zebra mussel, tamarisk, hydrilla, and Chinese tallow.

=== New York ===
The New York State Department of Environmental Conservation works with stewards of natural resources, non-profits, and citizen scientists to detect, record, and manage invasive species. These collaborations are organized into eight Partnerships for Regional Invasive Species Management (PRISMs) throughout the state. PRISMS performs the following tasks: plan regional invasive species management; develop early detection and rapid response capacity; implement eradication projects; educate the public in cooperation with DEC-contracted Education and Outreach providers; coordinate PRISM partners; recruit and train volunteers; support research through citizen science.

Counties of New York list invasive species in varying order of threat. Insects considered invasive include: Asian longhorned beetle; emerald ash borer; and spotted lanternfly.

=== North Carolina ===
In North Carolina, there are many invasive plant species that disrupt or compete with natural species. The North Carolina Invasive Plant Council (NC-IPC) is a non-profit that works with various parties such as environmental advocates, researchers, land conservation specialists, horticulture industries, and members of the general public to manage and remove invasive plant species in the state. In addition to management and removal processes, the council aims to implement an Early Detection and Rapid Response network. This network works towards identifying the signs of invasive species that are not already present in North Carolina and reporting it to the NC Department of Agriculture and Consumer Services.

=== Pennsylvania ===
Pennsylvania has a Governor's Invasive Species Council, which develops action plans to address threats to the Commonwealth's agricultural and natural resources. Spotted lanternfly is one of the newest and most urgent threats to businesses in Pennsylvania, including vineyards and wineries, orchards, and hops producers.

=== Rhode Island ===
Species of concern in Rhode Island include burning bush (Euonymus alatus), Oriental bittersweet (Celastrus orbiculatus), and purple loosestrife (Lythrum salicaria).

=== Virginia ===
Several invasive species have been recorded in Virginia. According to the government of Virginia, the species of top priority are Callery Pear, Tree of Heaven, Japanese Stilt Grass, Phragmites, Rapa Whelk, Imported Fire Ants, and Feral Swine.

Other listed species are

- Alligatorweed
- Beach Vitex
- Chinese Mitten Crab
- Cogon Grass
- Emerald Ash Borer
- Giant Hogweed
- Giant Salvinia
- Northern Snakehead
- Primrose Willow
- Rusty crayfish
- Spotted Lanternfly
- Sudden Oak Death
- Tropical Soda Apple
- Two-horned Trapa
- Water Hyacinth
- Water Spinach
- Waterwheel Plant
- Wavyleaf Grass
- Zebra Mussel

== See also ==
- List of invasive species in North America
- List of invasive species in the Mid-Atlantic region of the United States
- Environmental issues in the United States
- Fauna of the United States
