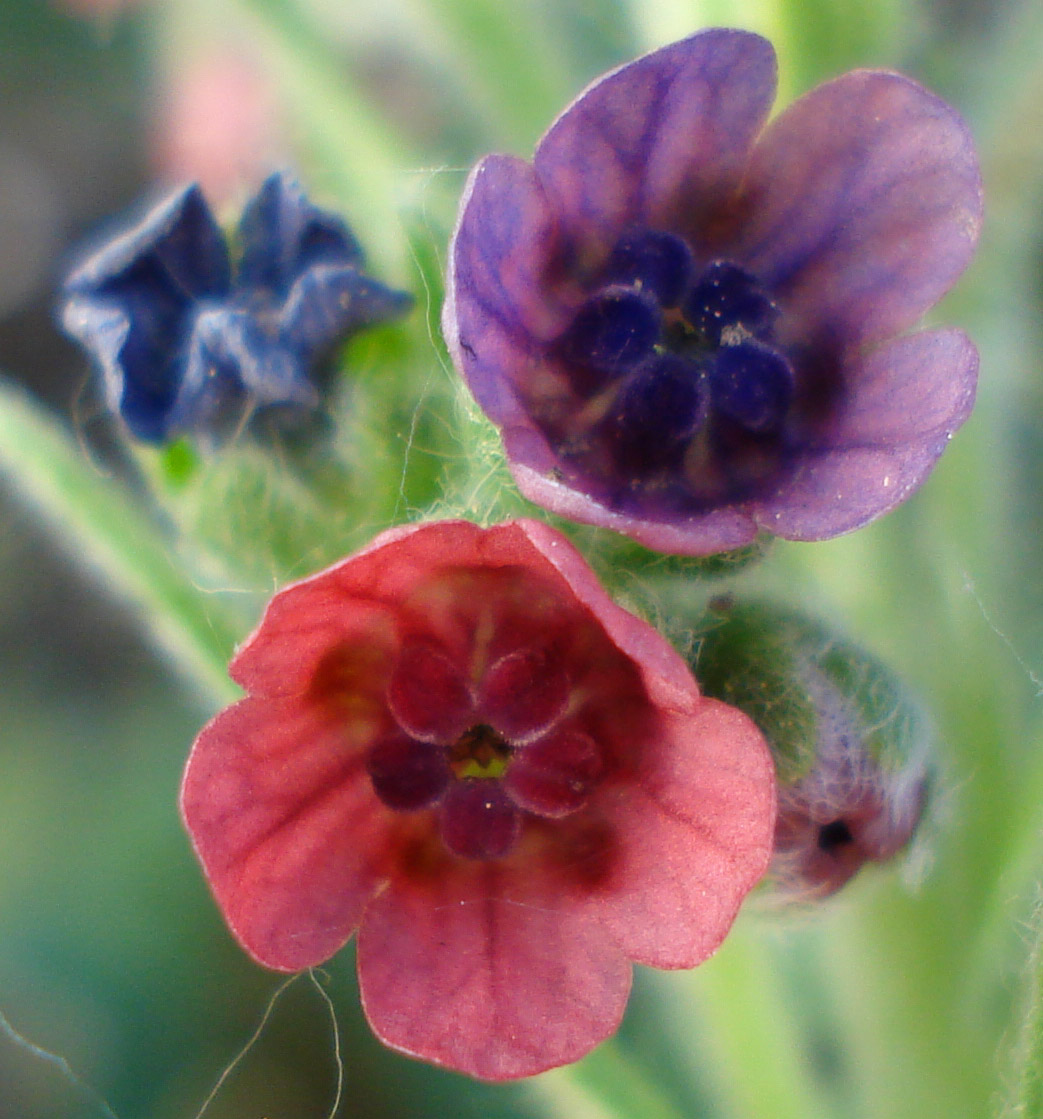

Scientific classification
- Kingdom: Plantae
- Clade: Tracheophytes
- Clade: Angiosperms
- Clade: Eudicots
- Clade: Asterids
- Order: Boraginales
- Family: Boraginaceae
- Genus: Cynoglossum
- Species: C. officinale

Binomial name
- Cynoglossum officinale L.

= Cynoglossum officinale =

Species of flowering plant

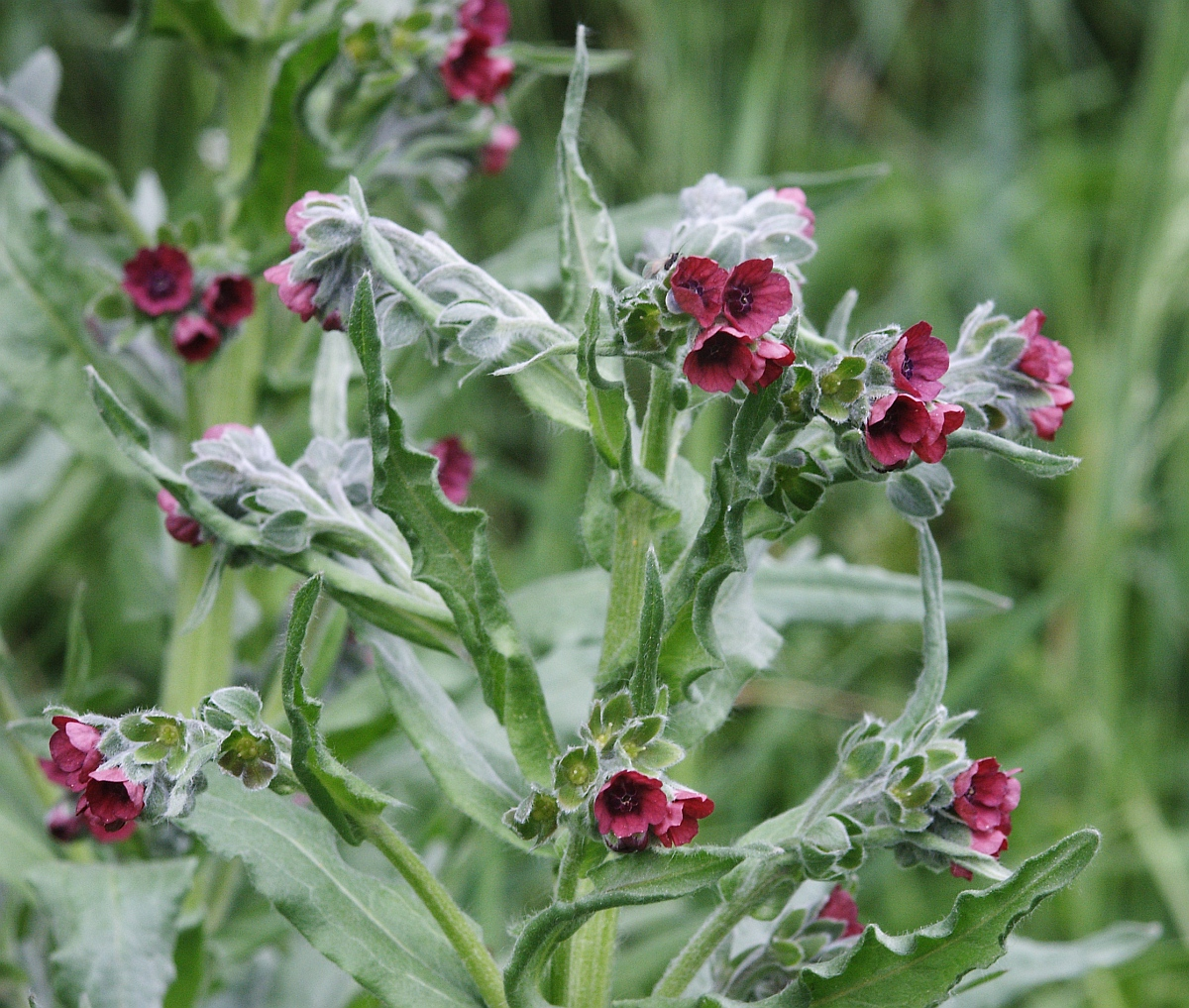
Flowers and leaves

Cynoglossum officinale (houndstongue, houndstooth, dog's tongue, gypsy flower, and rats and mice due to its smell) is a herbaceous plant of the family Boraginaceae.

== Description ==
It can be either annual or biennial. Leaves are greyish and softly haired, lanceolate to oblong. Reddish-purple funnel-shaped flowers bloom between May and September.

The plant owes its common and scientific name to the long greyish leaves that are reminiscent of a dog's tongue and were once given as a remedy for dog bites.

== Distribution and habitat ==
Found in most parts of Europe, and also North America, where it was accidentally introduced including in British Columbia, where it is designated a noxious weed under the British Columbia Weed Control Act. It lives in wet places, sand dunes, waste land and hedges.

== Ecology ==
Houndstongue may be pollinated by bees, and may also self-pollinate.

== Etymology ==
The name "houndstongue" (and the Latin genus Cynoglossum) comes from the shape of the leaf.

== Herbalism ==
In 1725, houndstooth was presented in the family dictionary, Dictionaire oeconomique, as part of a cure for madness. In that book, madness was viewed as "a distemper, not only of the understanding, but also of the reason and memory, proceeding from a cold, which drys up everything it meets with that is humid in the brain." To cure madness, Dictionaire oeconomique noted:

You must shave the head of the unhappy patient, and after that, apply to it a pidgeon, or a hen quite alive; or else bathe it with some brandy distilled with rosemary, elder, hounds tooth, and the roots of bugloss, or with the oyl of elder flowers: they rub their heads and wash their feet with a decoction of the flowers of camomile, melilot, balm gentle and laurel; they put into their noses the juice of comfrey, with either two or three spoonfuls of honey-water, broth, or white-wine, wherein wormwood and sage are infus'd ; or else they do for five and twenty days together, mix with their broth in the morning, halt a dram of the ashes of tortoise, and they put into the pot bugloss, borage, with a pinch of rosemary to season it.

In the 1830s, houndstooth was known in France to be made into an emollient and diuretic for daily use in inflammatory diseases, especially of the urinary organs. To prepare as a diuretic, the houndstooth leaves were mashed, and then boiled in water to extract oils, volatile organic compounds, and other chemical substances. The mix could be sweetened with liquorice to create Ptisan of Dog's-grass. After decoction, the herbal tea was taken internally a cupful at a time. In 1834, the Hospital of Paris provided a formula of 2/3 ss—J to Oij of water for houndstooth tea. By the end of the 1830s, doctors in England were using houndstooth as an antiaphrodisiac to combat venereal excesses.

Herbalists use the plant for piles, lung diseases, persistent coughs, baldness, sores, and ulcers but the effectiveness of all these uses is not supported by any scientific evidence.

== As a weed ==
In 1891, the U.S. state of Michigan identified houndstooth, along with flea-bane, rag weed, burdock, cockle-bur, and stickseed, as some of the worst weeds in the state.

== Toxicity ==
Cynoglossum officinale contains tumorigenic pyrrolizidine alkaloids. It is toxic to cows and is especially dangerous to pasture owners.
