= SITC =

SITC may refer to:

- Smuggling Interdiction and Trade Compliance, a small, nationwide program within the United States Department of Agriculture, implemented to detect and stop the smuggling of agricultural commodities
- Social in the City, fan events in Birmingham (Winter Edition since 2019) and London (Summer Edition since 2020)
- Society for Immunotherapy of Cancer, a professional society for advancing the science and application of cancer immunotherapy
- Standard International Trade Classification, a classification of goods used to classify the exports and imports of a country to enable comparing different countries and years
- Summer in the City (event), an annual YouTube fan event in London (2009-2019)
- Sultan Idris Training College, historical name of the Sultan Idris Education University, a teachers' college in Malaysia and a historical source of Malaysian language policy
