= Injurious wildlife =

Injurious Wildlife Federal Law

Injurious wildlife is a U.S. federal designation under the statute 18 U.S.C. § 42 that prohibits the importation of injurious (invasive or otherwise harmful) wildlife species into the United States. That statute originated from a law passed in 1900, when U.S. Representative John Fletcher Lacey introduced a bill "to regulate the introduction of American or foreign birds or [mammals] in localities where they have not heretofore existed," and that law became known as the Lacey Act of 1900. Federal laws during that period did not have official names. Besides the injurious part of the law, another purpose in that same Act, and the one more often associated with Lacey's name, prohibited the interstate transport of game animals killed in violation of local laws (now 16 U.S.C. §§ 3371–3378). In 1948, the injurious wildlife provision of the "Lacey Act of 1900" was removed and made its own statute (18 U.S.C. 42), also with no name, and that is how it has remained since then. This change is largely ignored by people who still wrongfully call injurious wildlife a provision of the Lacey Act.

There is no definition of injurious wildlife in the law. Currently, injurious wildlife species are wild mammals, wild birds, fishes, amphibians, reptiles, mollusks, and crustaceans found through regulation or Congressional action to be injurious to the interests of human beings, agriculture, horticulture, forestry, or to wildlife or wildlife resources of the United States. The law is implemented by the U.S. Fish and Wildlife Service and prohibits the importation of high-risk wildlife species into the United States, any territory of the United States, the District of Columbia, the Commonwealth of Puerto Rico, or any possession of the United States, or any shipment between the continental United States, the District of Columbia, Hawaii, the Commonwealth of Puerto Rico, or any possession of the United States. Exceptions may be made with a permit issued by the U.S. Fish and Wildlife Service for importation and some interstate shipment for zoological, educational, medical, and scientific purposes. The penalty for a violation of 18 U.S.C. § 42 is up to 6 months in prison and a $5,000 fine for an individual or a $10,000 fine for an organization. The law does not address export, interstate transport within the continental United States, intrastate transport, sale, or possession.

Preventing the importation of injurious wildlife is important because invasive species can prey on endangered and other native species, devour crops and native plants, clog water intake pipes at power plants, short out power lines, degrade ecosystems, spread diseases. and cause other harms. Economic costs to the public of invasions are difficult to measure but have been reported for the United States from 1960 to 2020 as totaling $1.22 trillion when conservatively considering only observed, highly reliable cost estimates.

== History of injurious wildlife ==
From 1900 to 1939, the U.S. Department of Agriculture was given the authority from Congress to implement the Lacey Act. During that time, the justification for destinating species as injurious was to protect the interests of agriculture and horticulture, and mammals and birds were the greatest threat. In 1940, Congress transferred the authority to the U.S. Department of the Interior's newly created U.S. Fish and Wildlife Service. From 1900 to 1948, wild mammals and wild birds could not be imported except with a permit (granted for shipments, not for species). A 1948 amendment created the stand-alone injurious wildlife law (18 U.S.C.). Wild mammals and birds designated as injurious could not be imported into the United States for any reason, which continued until 1960. The first species considered as injurious were specified in "the Lacey Act of 1900", and they were a mongoose (Herpestes auropunctatus), a genus of fruit bats (Pteropus), the European starling, and the English sparrow.

In 1960, Congress expanded the injurious statute to include more types of wildlife that could be listed as injurious besides mammals and birds. They are fishes, amphibians, reptiles, mollusks, and crustaceans, as it is today. The 1960 amendments included the addition of the permit exception, meaning that injurious species previously unconditionally prohibited from importation could be imported with a permit. The starling and the sparrow were removed from the statute at that time because they had spread so widely across the United States that there was no point in prohibiting further importation. Another significant change was the addition of interests that could be affected as justification for designating species. Besides causing harm to agriculture or horticulture, species can be determined to be injurious if they can cause injury to human beings, forestry, or to wildlife or wildlife resources of the United States.

== How species are listed as injurious ==
Under 18 U.S.C. 42, the Secretary of the Interior may prescribe by regulation (add to the list) wildlife species that are injurious to the interests of human beings, agriculture, horticulture, forestry, or to wildlife or wildlife resources of the United States. The responsibility of drafting the regulations has been delegated to the U.S. Fish and Wildlife Service. The Service drafts rules following the Administrative Procedure Act. The Service gathers information on species that could be injurious, often by using modeling to determine their risk level. After gathering sufficient information, the Service evaluates the species under a set of criteria the agency developed. The Service evaluates factors that contribute to injuriousness as well as measures that reduce the likelihood of the species being considered as injurious. Normally, the agency then publishes a proposed rule in the Federal Register, seeks public comment and peer review, and follows with a final rule, after which one or more species may be added to the injurious wildlife species list in the Code of Federal Regulations under 50 CFR 16. The U.S. Congress can also designate species as injurious by amending the statute and has done so for the zebra mussel (1990), brown tree snake (1991), bighead carp (2010), and quagga mussel (2018).

== Preventing wildlife invasions ==
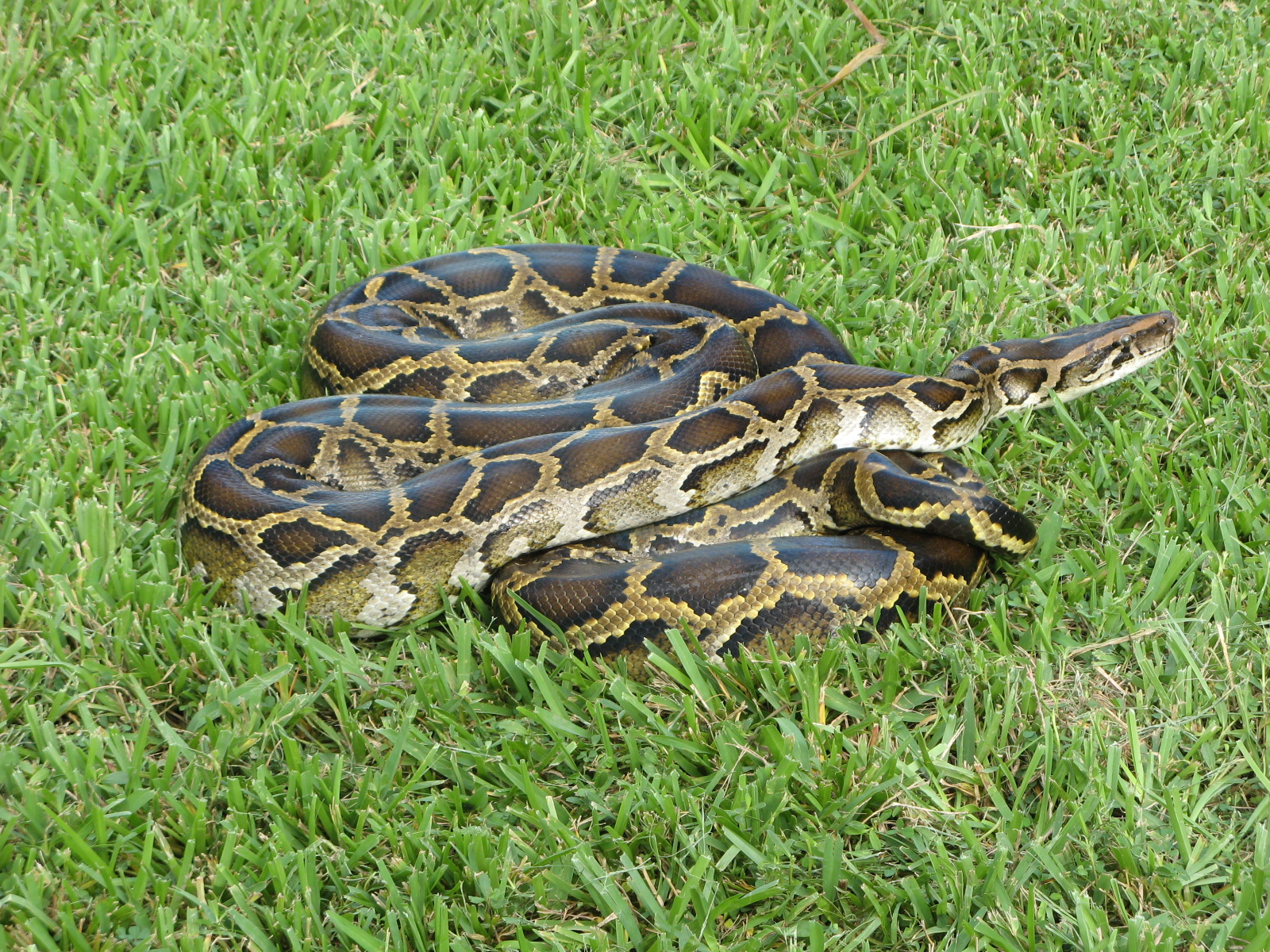
Captured Burmese python in the Everglades, listed as injurious in 2012 by the U.S. Fish and Wildlife Service

The best way to prevent wildlife invasions in the United States is to stop their introduction into the country, and that is why injurious wildlife listing is so important. More than 800 wildlife species from around the world are listed as injurious, including mammals, birds, fishes, salamanders, reptiles, mollusks, and crustaceans (50 CFR 16). Most species were listed for their traits of invasiveness. Some were listed because they can be hosts of harmful viruses or parasites that can be transmitted to other wildlife species or to humans. Of the more than 300 species listed for potential invasiveness, 94 percent were listed were listed before they were introduced into the United States, and those species have not subsequently become invasive, making the injurious wildlife law highly effective. Some species have been listed after they became invasive, such as the Burmese python in Florida, which is causing dramatic declines of wildlife in the Everglades. Although Burmese pythons were listed as injurious in 2012, after they became invasive, the U.S. Fish and Wildlife Service preemptively banned the importation of seven other species of large constrictor snakes from foreign countries before they could become invasive. These include the two largest snakes in the world, the reticulated python and the green anaconda. Another species is the brushtail possum, which was already highly invasive in New Zealand but not invasive in the United States when the U.S. Fish and Wildlife Service added it to the injurious list in 2002, and it has not established in the wild in the United States.

The most recent major amendments to the law were in 1960, leaving a pressing need for modernizing to respond to the exponentially growing global trade in wildlife species. For example, the only invertebrates that can be listed as injurious are mollusk and crustacean species, leaving insects, jellyfish, and all other types of land and water invertebrates ineligible for listing. Other limitations are the fact that the law has no recognition because it has no official name, no definition of injurious, no mandate to list, no congressional funding, no emergency listing authority, no authority to list for similarity of appearance, etc. Some efforts have been made in Congress for modernizing the law, such as the bipartisan "Invasive Fish and Wildlife Prevention Act". Those bills and similar ones did not pass the Legislature but suggest ways to address the limitations of the current invasion law.

== See also ==
- Invasive species in the United States
