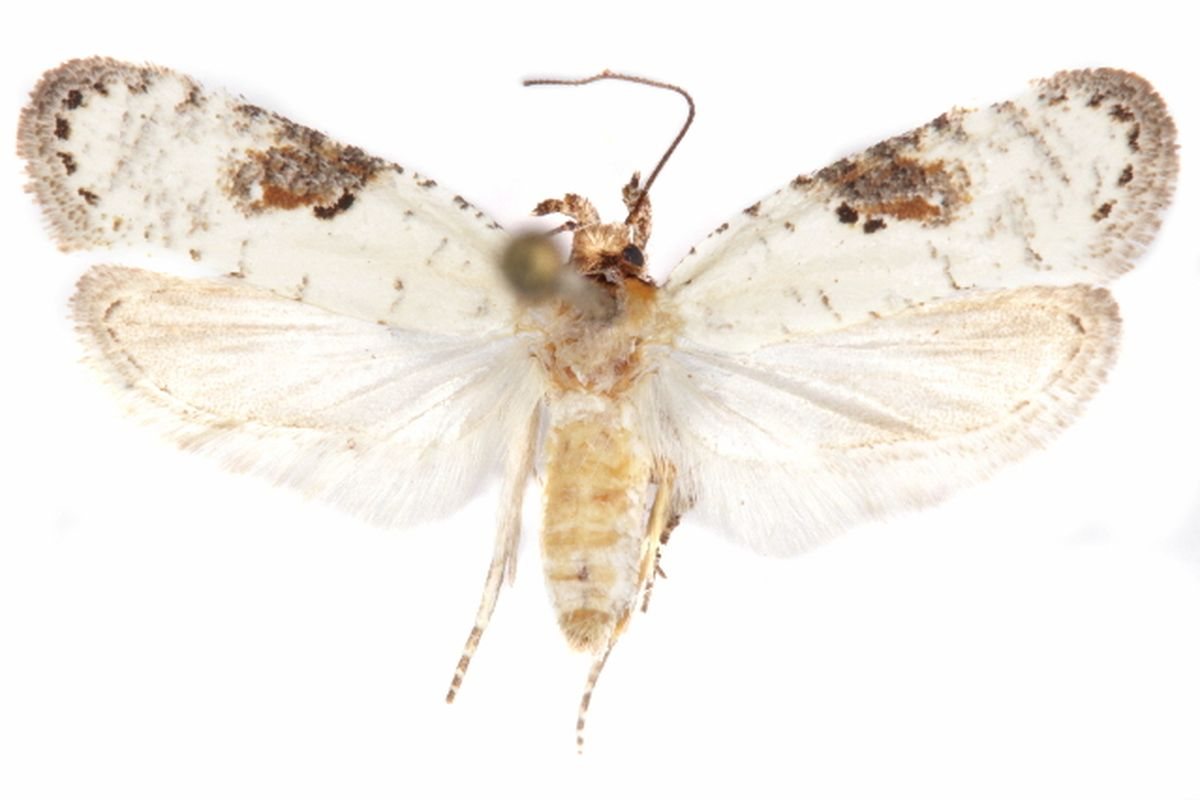

Scientific classification
- Kingdom: Animalia
- Phylum: Arthropoda
- Clade: Pancrustacea
- Class: Insecta
- Order: Lepidoptera
- Family: Depressariidae
- Genus: Exaeretia
- Species: E. canella

Binomial name
- Exaeretia canella (Busck, 1904)

Synonyms
- Depressaria canella Busck, 1904; Martyrhilda canella; Agonopteryx cogitata Braun, 1926

= Exaeretia canella =

Species of moth

Exaeretia canella is a moth in the family Depressariidae. It was described by August Busck in 1904. It is found in North America, where it has been recorded from California, Washington, from British Columbia to Quebec, Idaho, Colorado, Montana, Wyoming, Michigan, New Hampshire, New York and Connecticut.

The wingspan is 16–20 mm. The forewings are pure white, marked with black, brown and fuscous. There are some inconspicuous black and fuscous spots and fine strigulae in the basal third and a large fuscous blotch is found from the costa at the middle, extending to near the middle of the cell. It is edged above and below with brown and is preceded by a black crescentic dash. There is a series of black or fuscous spots around the termen. The hindwings are light fuscous. It can be confused with Agonopterix alstroemeriana.

The larvae feed on Antennaria luzuloides and Gnaphalium species.
