= Alien Species Prevention and Enforcement Act of 1992 =

- Other short titles: Executive Office Appropriations Act, 1993; Independent Agencies Appropriations Act, 1993; Postal Service Appropriations Act, 1993; Treasury Department Appropriations Act, 1993; Treasury Forfeiture Fund Act of 1992
- Long title: An Act to making appropriations for the Treasury Department, the United States Postal Service, the Executive Office of the President, and certain Independent Agencies, for the fiscal year ending September 30, 1993, and for other purposes.
- Nicknames: Treasury, Postal Service, and General Government Appropriations Act, 1993
- Enacted by: the 102nd United States Congress
- Effective: October 6, 1992

Citations
- Public law: 102-393
- Statutes at Large: 106 Stat. 1729 aka 106 Stat. 1774

Codification
- Titles amended: 39 U.S.C.: Postal Service
- U.S.C. sections created: 39 U.S.C. ch. 30 § 3015

Legislative history
- Introduced in the House as H.R. 5488 by Edward R. Roybal (D–CA) on June 25, 1992; Committee consideration by House Appropriations, Senate Appropriations; Passed the House on July 1, 1992 (237-166, Roll call vote 262, via Clerk.House.gov); Passed the Senate on September 10, 1992 (82-12, Roll call vote 202, via Senate.gov); Reported by the joint conference committee on September 28, 1992; agreed to by the House on October 1, 1992 (291-126, Roll call vote 449, via Clerk.House.gov) and by the Senate on October 1, 1992 (agreed voice vote); Signed into law by President George H. W. Bush on October 6, 1992

In the United States the Alien Species Prevention and Enforcement Act of 1992 (P.L. 102–393) makes it illegal to ship certain categories of plants and animals through the mail. The prohibited species are certain injurious animals, plant pests, plants and materials under federal quarantine, and certain plants and animals under the Lacey Act (16 U.S.C. 3371–3378), a law that pertains to illegal trade in fish, wildlife, and plants. These also may be referred to as invasive species. The idea behind the piece of legislation is to protect native species and maintain a relatively high level of biodiversity.

== See also ==
- Invasive species in the United States
