= Stickseed =

Stickseed is a common name for plants in several genera of the family Boraginaceae and may refer to:

- Hackelia
- Lappula
