= British Columbia Weed Control Act =

The British Columbia Weed Control Act also known as The Weed Control Act (RSBC 1996, c. 487) is a statute of the British Columbia, Canada governing the control of designated harmful weeds (defined as noxious weed in the act). It is limited to plants and does not cover other invasive species. The Act places a duty on occupiers of land and premises to control noxious weeds designated by regulation and establishes powers and procedures for inspection, enforcement, notices, cost recovery, and the administration of weed-control programs.

== History ==
The Act was originally released in 1973 as the Weed Control Act, SBC 1973, c. 162, It received royal assent on November 7, 1973, and was subsequently consolidated as chapter 487 of the Revised Statutes of British Columbia, 1996.

== Purpose and scope ==
The Act defines a "noxious weed" as a weed designated as such by regulation, including its seeds. It also defines an "occupier" broadly to include a person who is in physical possession of land or who is responsible for and has control over its condition, activities and access. Municipalities and the provincial government may also be occupiers for purposes of the Act.

The Government of British Columbia describes the Act as imposing a duty on land occupiers to control designated noxious plants. The legislation is intended to protect British Columbia's economy, natural resources and society from the negative effects of foreign weeds.

== Examples of noxious weeds ==
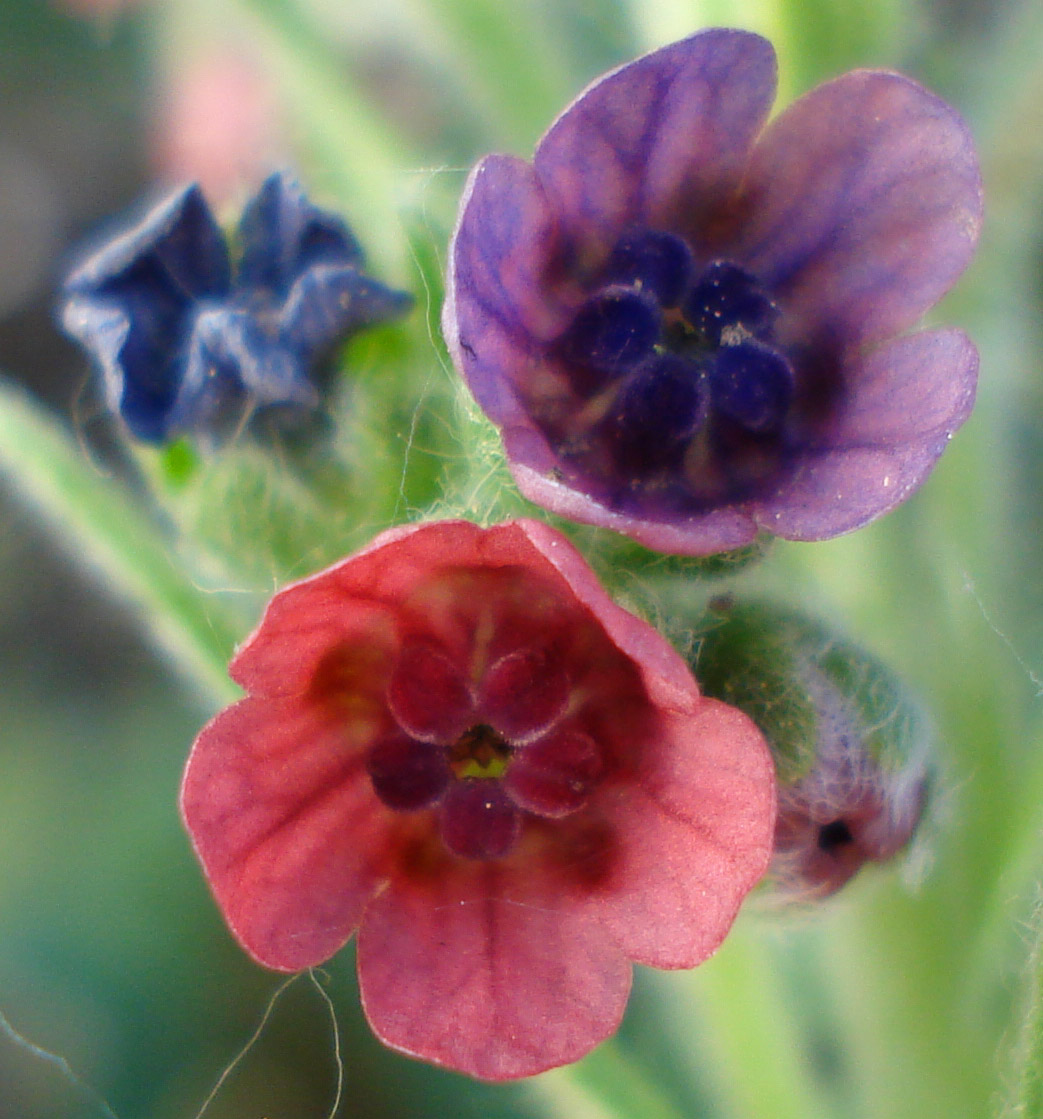
Cynoglossum officinale is considered a noxious weed in British Columbia.

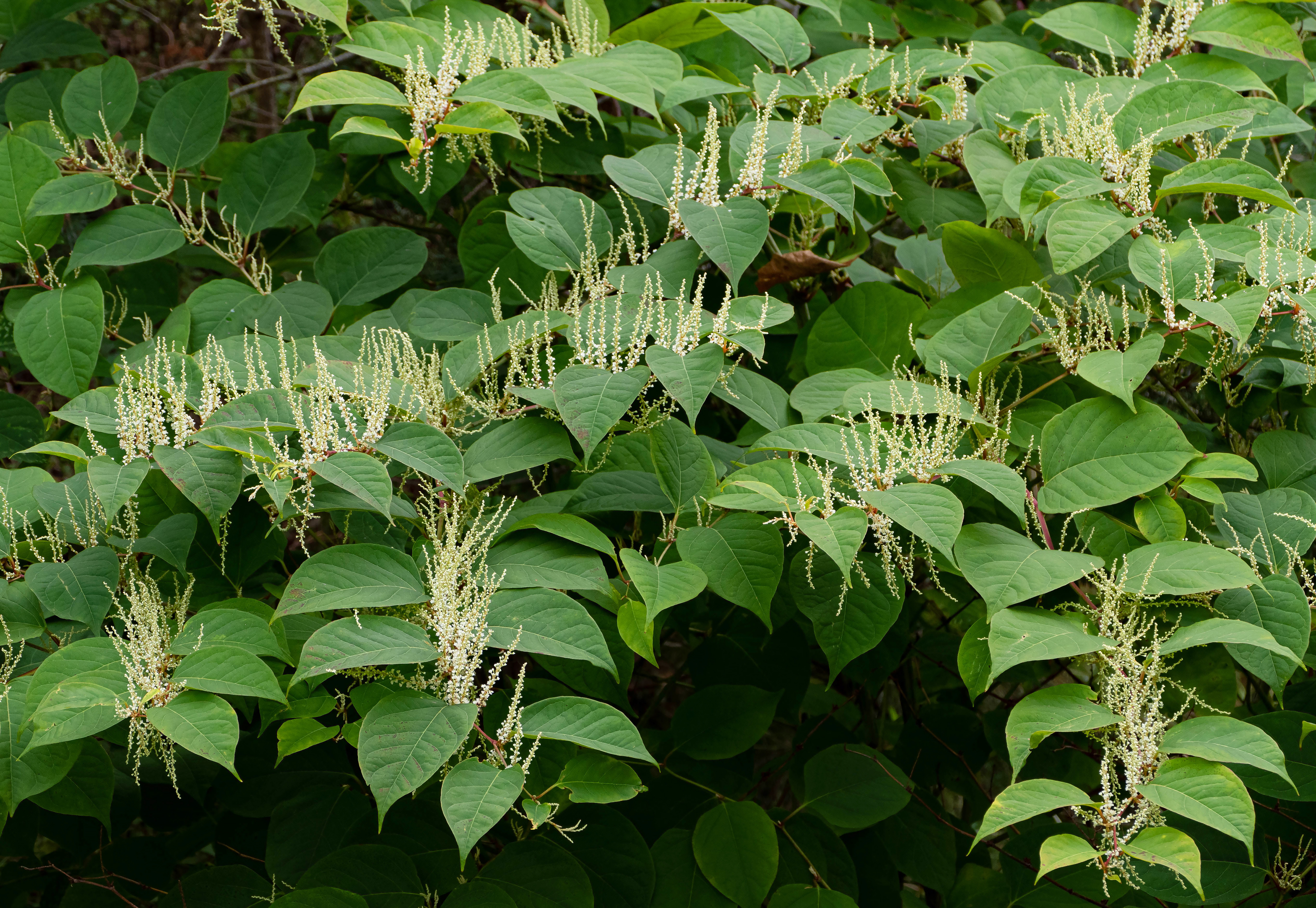
Japanese knotweed is among the species considered noxious by the Act.

Some examples of noxious weeds under the act, such as Reynoutria japonica, are considered Invasive species in other parts of Canada as well. There are regionally noxious weeds as well. Examples of this category include plants such as cynoglossum officinale and Leucanthemum vulgare.

== Administration and enforcement ==
The Ministry of Forests (British Columbia) is responsible for the enforcement of the Act. The ministry may appoint inspectors, who may enter land and premises other than residences during daylight hours to administer and enforce the Act and its regulations. An inspector may serve an occupier with a notice requiring specified noxious weeds to be controlled. Notices may be served personally, by registered mail, or by leaving them with an appropriate person occupying residential or business premises.

If noxious weeds are not controlled within the period specified in a notice. If an inspector considers immediate action necessary, they may enter the property and undertake weed control without further notice. The costs may be certified against the occupier.

== See also ==
- Invasive Species Act (Ontario)
- Invasive species
- Noxious weed
- Agriculture in British Columbia
