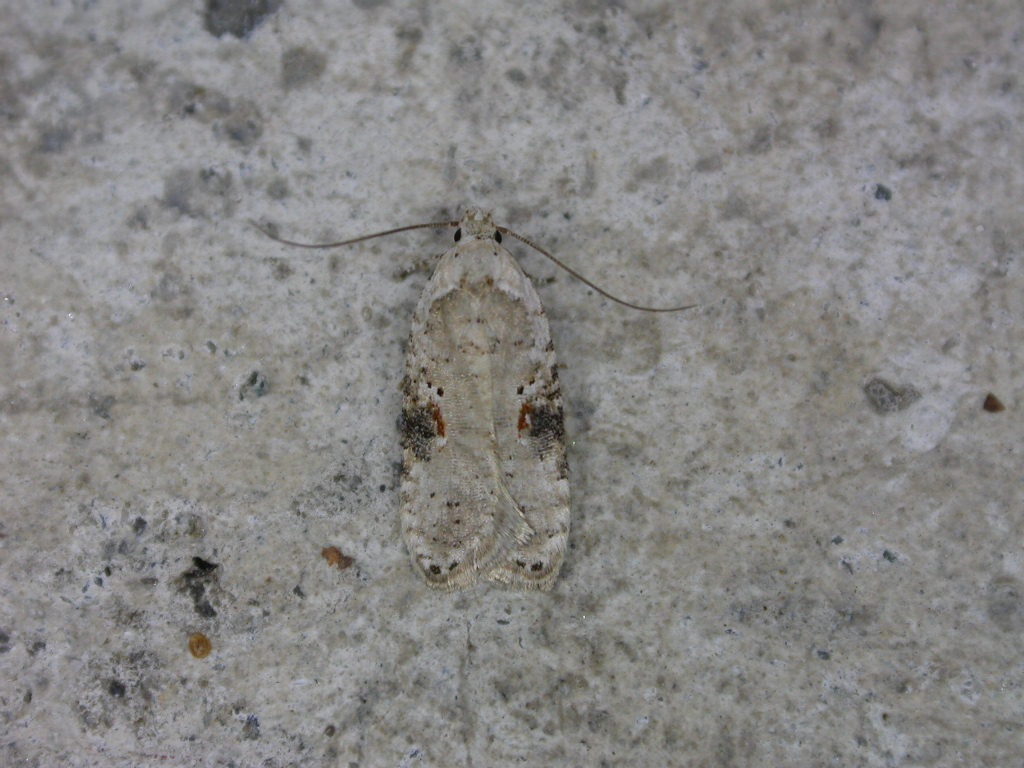
- A camouflaged adult
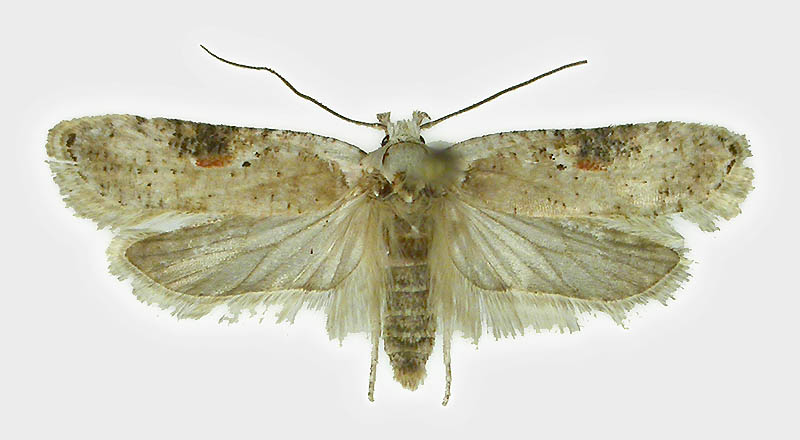
- Mounted adult

Scientific classification
- Kingdom: Animalia
- Phylum: Arthropoda
- Clade: Pancrustacea
- Class: Insecta
- Order: Lepidoptera
- Family: Depressariidae
- Genus: Agonopterix
- Species: A. alstroemeriana

Binomial name
- Agonopterix alstroemeriana (Clerck, 1759)

Synonyms
- Phalaena alstroemeriana Clerck, 1759; Agonopterix alstroemeriana (Clerck, 1759); Tinea monilella Denis & Schiffermüller, 1775; Tinea puella Hübner, 1796; albidella Eversmann, 1844

= Agonopterix alstroemeriana =

Hemlock moth

Species of moth

The hemlock moth (Agonopterix alstroemeriana), also known as the defoliating hemlock moth or poison hemlock moth, is a nocturnal moth species of the family Depressariidae. Of Palaearctic origin, it was first found in North America in 1973 when it was accidentally introduced. The moth is widespread throughout the northern half of the United States, southern Canada, northern Europe, and, more recently, New Zealand and Australia. The larval form grows to around 10 mm, while the adults wingspan is between 17 mm and 19 mm.

It is best known for its use in biological control of the lethal poison hemlock (Conium maculatum), which is eaten by its caterpillars (larvae). The toxicity of its host plant may actually benefit the caterpillar because it helps females recognize locations for oviposition. This species also uses the leaves of its host plant (C. maculatum) to form protective tubes around the caterpillar.

== Taxonomy ==
This species was first described in 1759 by Carl Alexander Clerck and originally named Phalaena alstroemeriana.

== Identification ==
Adult moths are pale brown, almost tan, with a lighter colored area near the bottom of their wings and a few darker spots found near the edges of the wings. They have a distinguishing brown or reddish spot near the center of each wing. The hemlock moth can be confused with another moth of the family Depressariidae, Exaeretia canella, which is similar in coloration. However, E. canella does not have a reddish spot, and has a dark head.

As eggs, they have a pale, off-white color. As caterpillars, they are yellow with a black head. After growing in size (to around 10 mm), the caterpillars are thin and have a light green color, with three prominent stripes on the sides of their bodies, which are a darker green.

== Distribution ==
=== Range ===
A. alstroemeriana is a wide-ranging species native to Europe, that has more recently spread to North America, Australian and New Zealand. In North America, it is most common to the northeastern and northwestern United States, as well as the southern regions of Canada. It has spread inland in both nations, and can now commonly be found in the Midwestern states of the U.S. as well.

The first North American sighting of the hemlock moth was of a caterpillar seen in Tompkins County, New York in 1973. After that, Agonopterix alstroemeriana spread quickly throughout the United States. It was found in the Pacific Northwest in 1983–1985, possibly spread by the accidental shipping of dormant moths. The moth was seen in the Midwest starting in 1990, when it was discovered near Columbus, Ohio. It was established in Illinois in 1993, after being identified by the rolled leaves of Conium maculatum, a characteristic indication of the presence of A. alstroemeriana.

The species has been breeding in New Zealand since 1986 and it is likely that the moth then spread from New Zealand to southern Tasmania, where its presence was discovered in 2019.

=== Habitat ===
The poison hemlock moth can be found wherever its host plant (Conium maculatum) occurs. Thus, the moth is most commonly seen in open fields and roadsides in suburban and rural locations. In the U.S., A. alstroemeriana often winters under the bark of firewood; then flies away after being warmed up when the wood is brought into the house. Moths also may come inside buildings and housing during the night, as they are attracted to light.

== Behavior ==
=== Leaf rolling ===
The caterpillars in earlier instars form tubes from the leaves of Conium maculatum by rolling the leaves together using a secreted webbing material. Older caterpillars make tubes from the flowers and seed heads as well as the leaves. Abandoned tubes can regularly be found on the poison hemlock plant because, if disturbed or attacked, the caterpillar will wriggle free of the tube and onto the ground as a predation defense mechanism.

== Life cycle ==
=== Eggs ===
Around 200 small eggs are laid by the female, and they are placed on the underside of the leaves of their host plant, Conium maculatum. As eggs, they have a pale color.

=== Larva ===
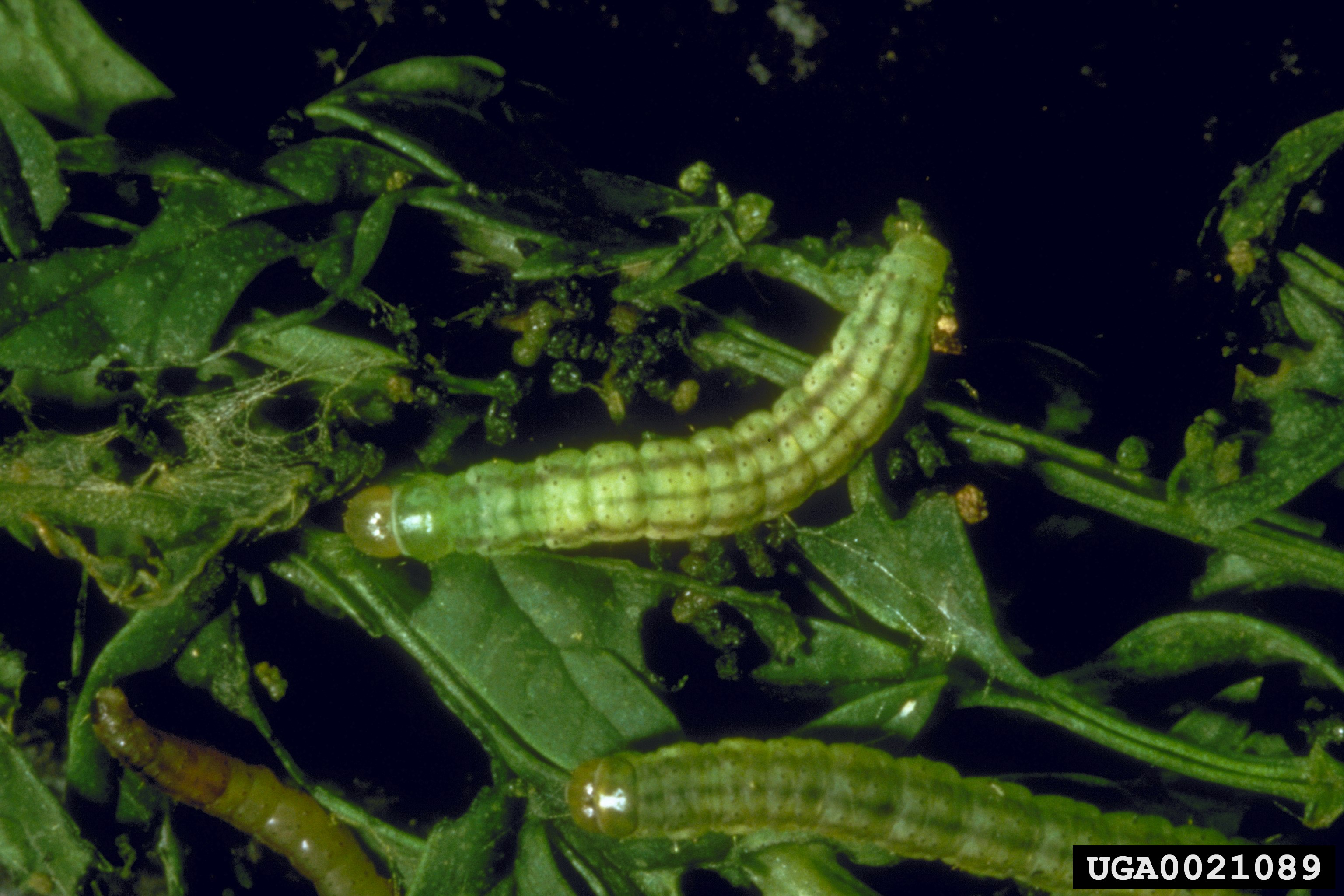
Larva in a later instar

The eggs hatch into caterpillars about 6 days after being laid. Earlier instars are yellow with a black head capsule. After feeding on their hostplant and growing in size, the caterpillars have a light green color. After almost a month of growth, the caterpillars are around 10 mm long (.4 in). The last instar larva is green with three dark green stripes. Larvae often emerge in April and May. Hemlock moth larvae have been known to shelter together in high numbers, since the larvae seem to repel predators with toxic alkaloids obtained from its host plant. They also have the advantage of local predators being less familiar with the species because they are non-native.

The caterpillar may also benefit from the toxic alkaloids present in the poison hemlock host plant because they may increase the ability of A. alstroemeriana to recognize Conium maculatum as the correct location for oviposition.

=== Pupa ===
They pupate for 2 weeks in the soil, usually from late May to early June. The color of pupa is red-brown, with fine hairs densely located. The length of pupae is approximately 6–7 mm.

=== Adult ===
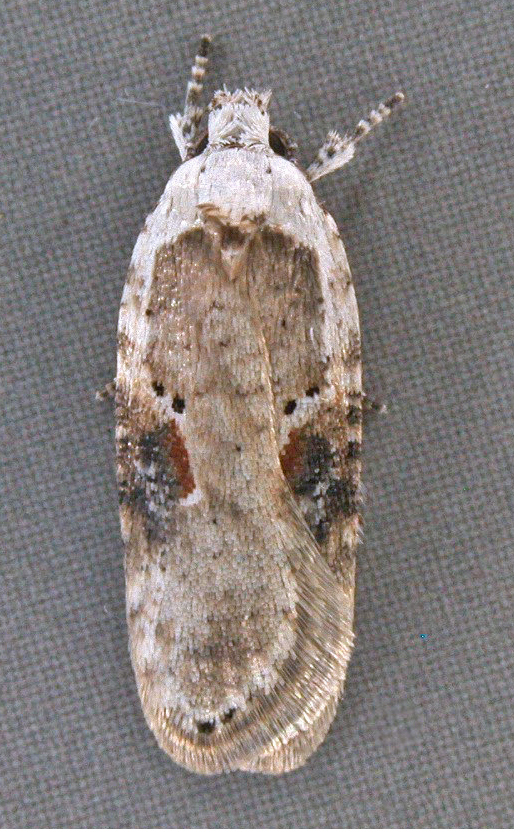
Adult A. alstromeriana

After pupating, the moths emerge from the soil as adults. This adult emergence usually occurs in mid- to late- June. The adults must therefore stay alive through the winter in order to breed during the spring. Adults generally live from June to March, making A. alstroemeriana a relatively long-lived moth species.

== Native predator emergence in Great Lakes ==
Recently, A. alstroemeriana has been predated upon by a wasp species, Euodynerus foraminatus native to the United States, which is part of the family Eumenidae of Hymenoptera. This wasp is known for paralyzing the larvae of Lepidoptera, now including the hemlock moth, in order to feed it to its young. This newfound predator may limit the effects that A. alstroemeriana have in defoliating C. maculatum.

== Biological control usage ==
A. alstroemeriana can now be found throughout the United States. In locations where it has intentionally been released as a biological control agent, the species has rapidly established itself. In already established areas for the moth, like the Pacific Northwest, A. alstroemeriana can cause serious damage to the poison hemlock plant; wherein hundreds of larvae exist on individual host plants. Large areas of Conium maculatum can be killed when caterpillars of A. alstroemeriana exist at these densities.

=== Biological control limitations ===
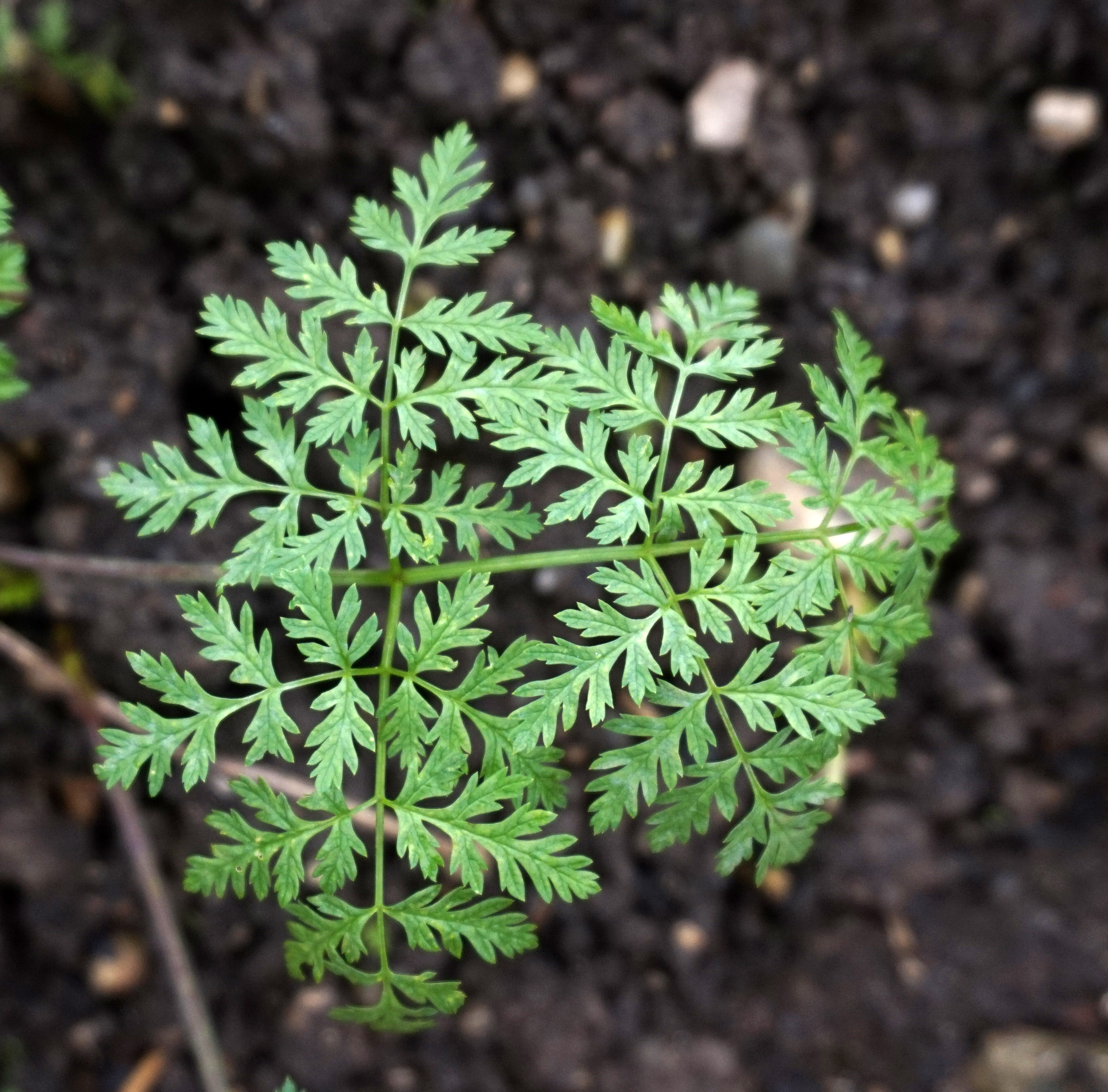
Leaves of Conium maculatum, the moth's hostplant

The use of A. alstroemeriana as a biological control method has been limited by the scarcity of information on its life history and feeding habits and the ability to harvest the larvae only in early to mid-spring. Since C. maculatum serves as a stock for a variety of plant diseases, and can overrun fields growing cattle feed, it has been implicated in killing livestock through hay contamination. Therefore, agriculturalists have made it a priority to address the widespread nature of poison hemlock.

The number of eggs that A. alstroemeriana lays is known to be associated with the dry weight of the leaf. However, oviposition was not correlated positively with the concentration of alkaloids in the poison hemlock, which varies widely among individual plants.

=== Behavioral and physiological effects of alkaloids ===
The effects that the alkaloids in Conium maculatum cause on the moth, both physiologically and behaviorally, are relatively unknown. Persons interested in the biological control capabilities of A. alstroemeriana see behavioral dependency on the host plant as an asset when using this moth as a biological control agent, because this reduces the possibility of the moth affecting other species besides the host plant.

Preliminary research has not found any negative physiological effects caused by the high alkaloid toxicity of poison hemlock. The moth may actually benefit from the alkaloids present in its feeding behavior.
