= Smuggling Interdiction and Trade Compliance =

The Smuggling Interdiction and Trade Compliance Program is a component of the United States Department of Agriculture (USDA) Animal and Plant Health Inspection Service (APHIS), Plant Protection and Quarantine (PPQ). The mission of the Smuggling Interdiction and Trade Compliance Program is to detect and prevent the unlawful entry and distribution of prohibited and/or non-compliant products that may harbor exotic plant and animal pests, diseases or invasive species.

== History ==
In the mid 1990s, Asian fruit growers from the Homestead, Florida area complained to the PPQ Deputy Administrator about illegally imported specialty crops from Thailand flooding the New York markets. The agricultural products in New York eliminated the commodities' shipping costs from Florida and adversely affected many growers in the region. PPQ and APHIS Investigative and Enforcement Services (IES) formed a team that determined the prohibited items from Thailand were being smuggled through the Canada–US border in enormous quantities. These prohibited products were being offered for sale in the New York City market areas and were definitely competing with domestic and legal production.

PPQ team members intercepted the prohibited material crossing the Canada–US border, and IES prosecuted the violators taking part in the shipping operation. In the first 2 years of the program, more than 68 tons of prohibited Asian fruit were seized and destroyed.

The success of this operation led to the expansion of the program and development of specific position descriptions for PPQ liaison officers. A PPQ liaison officer is a PPQ officer who, in addition to their regular PPQ officer duties, works with IES investigators to identify and close the pathways of the unlawful entry and domestic distribution of prohibited foreign agricultural products into the United States. These positions were established nationwide in small numbers and organized into a network of officers whose main function was to detect and close smuggling pathways.

With new positions and a growing challenge, PPQ established two additional satellite programs: Closing the Los Angeles Marketplace Pathway (CLAMP) and Florida Interdiction and Smuggling Team (FIST). State and Federal officials in the CLAMP program were tasked to detect smuggled fruit-fly host material and close the pathway of that harmful pest. FIST, on the other hand, had objectives much larger in scope. Both programs effectively sealed off pathways for potential exotic pest introductions into the United States. As the organization became more successful, it was recognized into a disparate regulatory force within PPQ and reorganized into the current Smuggling Interdiction and Trade Compliance program.

== Work ==
SITC plays a major role in interdicting smuggled agricultural products before and after they reach US markets. SITC's work is successfully accomplished through numerous market surveys, analysis of trends and the use of various intelligence tools and data systems. SITC officers and analysts are experts in developing commercial targeting information, examining trends in international trade, identifying contraband in commerce, and at the consumer level. SITC staff also works closely with Department of Homeland Security Customs and Border Protection (CBP) at the Ports of Entry to interdict smuggled products.

In the marketplace, SITC officers conduct inspection surveys and intense trade compliance activities, looking to uncover prohibited or regulated items. This work may lead to trace backs to the Port of Entry in order to identify the distributor. Once a smuggling pathway is identified, it is shut down often resulting in civil and/or criminal prosecution, and recalls to safeguard American agriculture. The market place for SITC encompasses major distribution centers, flea markets, animal/plant and insect trade shows, large and small chain stores, roadside vendors and your neighborhood corner store. Lastly, the program has influenced changes in federal regulations in its efforts to regulate trade while promoting outreach and education to the public.

The SITC staff works closely with other federal, state and local agencies in order to accomplish the program mission. SITC Officers work with the State Plant Health Directors to aid in the identification of Hot Zones. Through partnerships with other agencies, SITC has provided other Federal (CBP, OIG, IES, ICE, FSIS, FDA, etc.) and State officials (state agriculture agencies) with information leading to seizures, the stop sell of products, criminal prosecutions and administrative violations.

While the SITC initiatives are often reactive, SITC takes many steps to be proactive which ultimately results in less cost to the American public for eradication programs. SITC Officers monitor increased threats with increased vigilance to monitor potential high risk smuggling pathways. The SITC staff works closely with liaison groups and industry to identify and address potential smugglers and various trade compliance issues. SITC Officers are flexible enough to be responsive to a wide breadth of agricultural threats, issues and challenges.

== Cooperation with other agencies ==
SITC staff work with other federal, state and local agencies. Through partnerships with other agencies, SITC has provided other Federal and State officials with information leading to agriculture seizures, halted sales of food products, criminal prosecutions and administrative violation processes. In the past, SITC has joined with:

- Customs and Border Protection
- USDA Inspector General
- APHIS Investigative and Enforcement Services
- USDA Food Safety and Inspection Service
- Food and Drug Administration
- US Fish and Wildlife Service

SITC assists PPQ State Plant Health Directors and the Pest Survey Specialists with their targeted surveys for specific exotic pests and plant diseases. Additionally, the SITC staff works closely with liaison groups and the industry to identify and address potential smugglers and various trade compliance issues.

== Staff ==
As of 2011, SITC employed a staff of 158 staff with 58 field offices located in major cities throughout the US. Additionally, the program has an intelligence unit that consists of eight SITC Operational Analysts, located in field and regional offices. They possess two SITC regional offices located in Fort Collins, Colorado and Raleigh, North Carolina; with a SITC National Coordinator located at the PPQ headquarters in Riverdale, Maryland.

== See also ==
- Invasive species in the United States
