= Invasive Species Act (Ontario) =

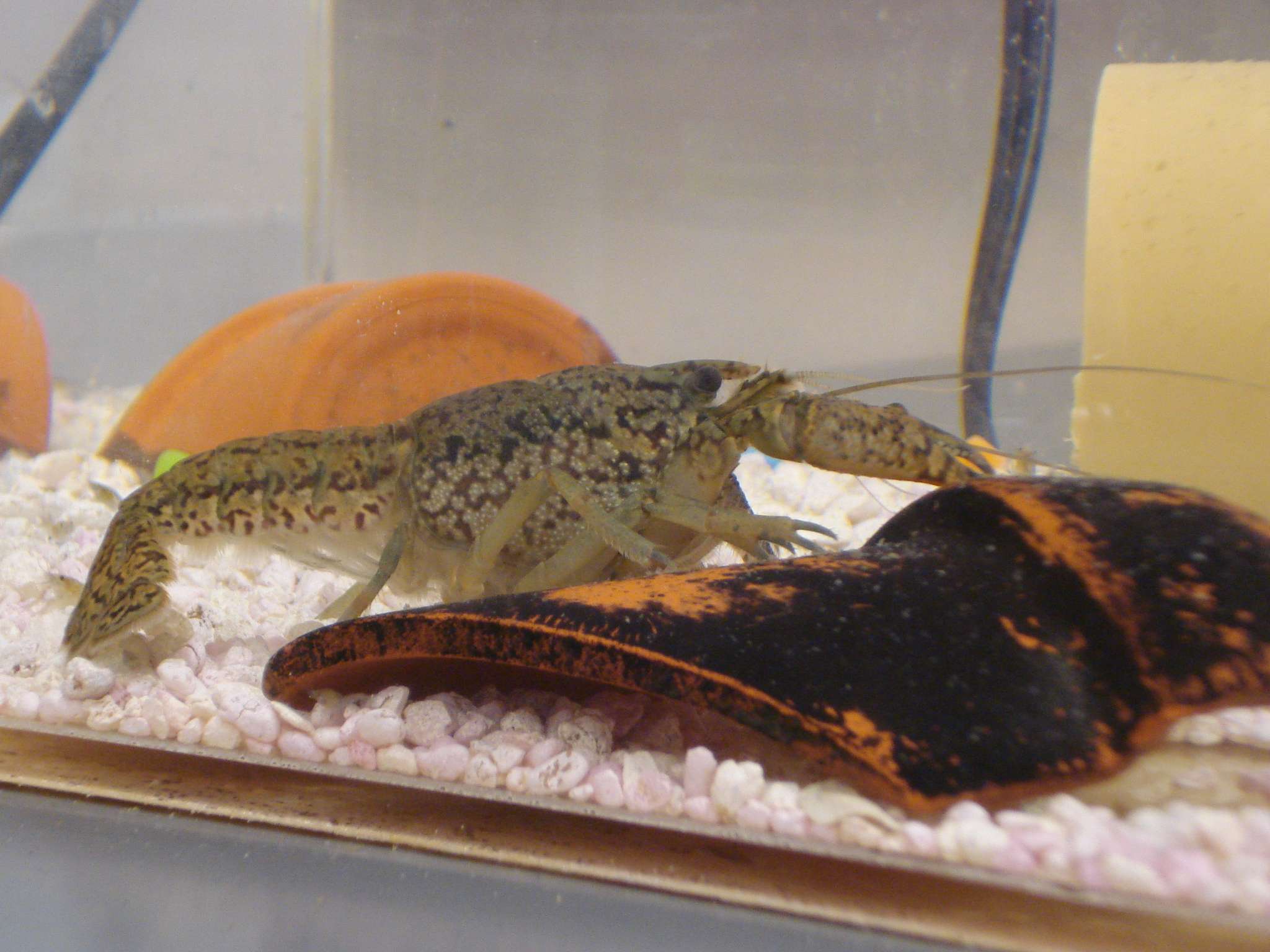
Several species of crayfish including marbled crayfish are designated as invasive species in Ontario under the Ontario Invasive Species Act.

The Ontario Invasive Species Act or Invasive Species Act, 2015, S.O. 2015, c. 22 is a piece of legislation in Ontario about invasive species. It was created in 2015 and amended in 2022 and 2024. The Act provides a framework and provisions for the prevention, detection, control, and eradication of invasive species that threaten the ecosystems in Ontario. The Act regulates organisms that are not native to Ontario and categorizes them into two main groups: prohibited invasive species and restricted invasive species. The restrictions and punishments vary for these two groups.

== Sections of the Act ==
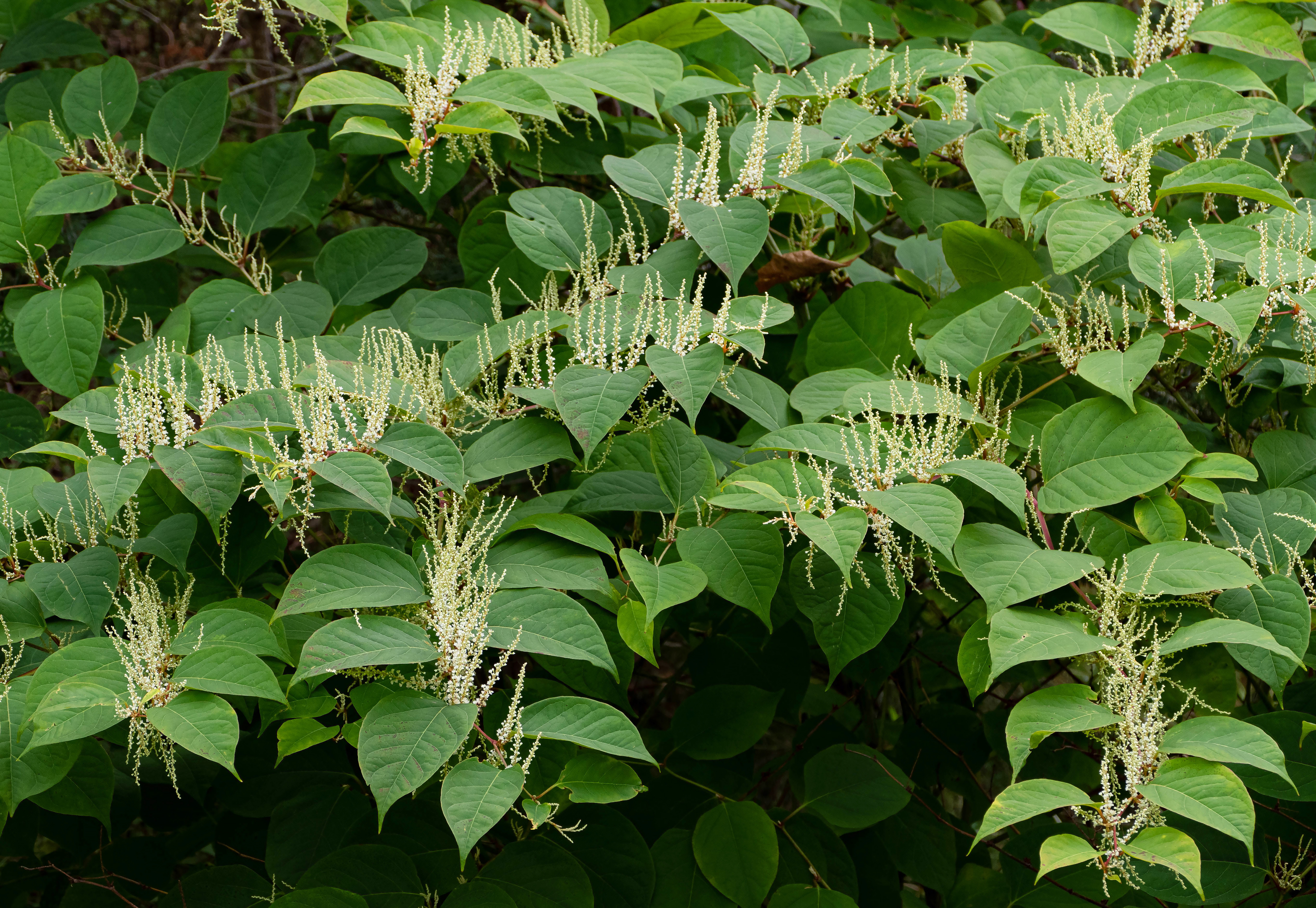
Japanese knotweed is considered an invasive species in Ontario.

The Act has 51 sections. Section 1 of the Act includes definitions including the definition of invasive species. Sections 17-21 are concerned with enforcement of the Act. Among other key sections are the following:

- Section 5: Designation of invasive species
- Section 7: Prohibited invasive species
- Section 8: Restricted invasive species

== Invasive species in Ontario ==
Section 5 of the Act gives the Ministry of Environment Conservation and Parks the authority to officially designate specific species as invasive, placing them into legally regulated categories, restrictive and prohibited. As of 2024 more than 20 species and four groups of species are regulated under Ontario's Invasive Species Act.

== Restricted invasive species ==
While these species pose threats but may already be established or have limited permitted uses. Nonetheless it is illegal to import or release them in Ontario. It is also illegal to bring them into provincial parks or conservation reserves. Examples of restricted species include plants such as phragmites and Japanese knotweed and mammals like wild pigs.

== Prohibited invasive species ==
The act provides the highest level of regulation around this category. It is illegal to import, possess, transport, grow, purchase, sell, lease, or trade these species anywhere inside Ontario. Examples include species of fish such as bighead carp and black carp as well as plants such as European water chestnut.

== See also ==
- Invasive species
- Noxious weed
- British Columbia Weed Control Act
