= Lacey Act of 1900 =

US conservation law prohibiting wildlife trade

The Lacey Act of 1900 is a conservation law in the United States that, as amended, now prohibits trade in wildlife, fish, and plants that have been illegally taken, possessed, transported, or sold.

Introduced into Congress by Representative John F. Lacey, an Iowa Republican, the Act was signed into law by William McKinley on May 25, 1900. It now protects both plants and wildlife by creating civil and criminal penalties for those who violate the rules and regulations (16 U.S.C. 3371-3378). The law authorizes the Secretary of the Interior to aid in restoring game and birds in parts of the U.S. where they have become extinct or rare. As of 1948, the provision for regulating the introduction of wild birds and mammals to places where they have never existed before became a separate statute, known as injurious wildlife species (18 U.S.C. 42).

Congress broadened the law to prohibit the import, export, transport, purchase, or sale of species when that action would violate state, federal, tribal, or foreign law. A 2008 amendment added coverage for timber and timber products. Various provisions of the Act are enforced by the U.S. Fish and Wildlife Service, the National Oceanic and Atmospheric Administration, U.S. Customs and Border Protection, the Animal and Plant Health Inspection Service and the U.S. Forest Service.

== Background ==
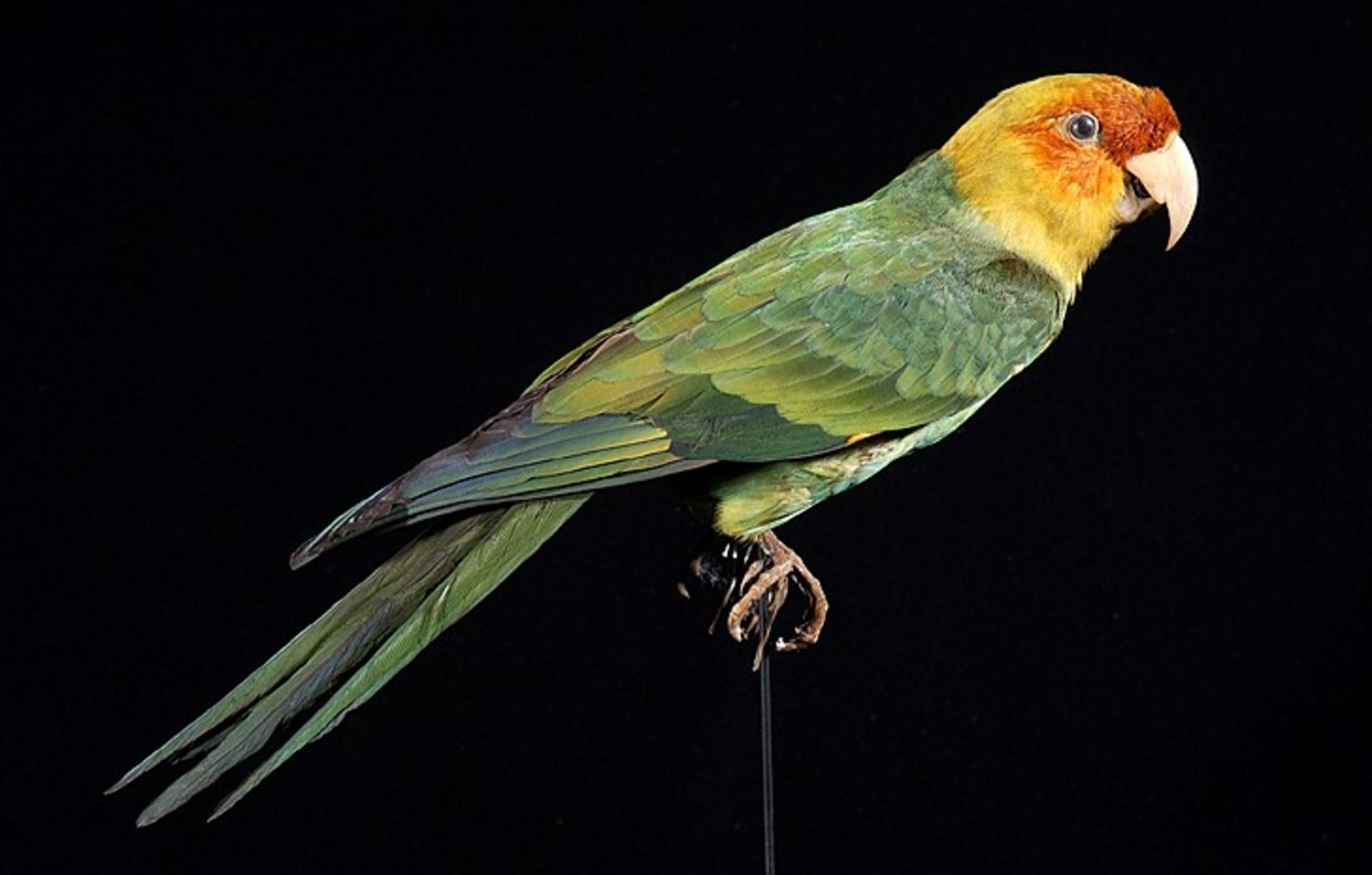
Mounted Carolina parakeet specimen in the Naturalis Biodiversity Center

In 1900, illegal commercial hunting threatened many game species in the United States. The original Act was directed at the preservation of game and wild birds, making it a federal crime to poach game in one state with the purpose of selling the bounty in another. The law prohibited the transportation of illegally captured or prohibited animals across state lines, and addressed potential problems caused by the introduction of non-native species of birds and animals into native ecosystems.

Another major motivation for the 1900 Lacey Act was the over-hunting of birds for millinery work. For example, the indiscriminate killing of birds by plume hunters in search of the snowy egret contributed to the extinction of the Carolina parakeet.

Today, the Lacey Act makes it unlawful to import, export, transport, sell, receive, acquire, or purchase in interstate or foreign commerce any plant in violation of the laws of the United States, a state, a Native American tribe, or any foreign law that protects plants.

== Amendments ==
The injurious wildlife provisions of the Lacey Act of 1900 were codified as a separate statute (18 U.S.C. 42) in 1948. Major amendments to that statute occurred in 1960 that expanded the types of wildlife that could be regulated to include fishes, reptiles, amphibians, mollusks, and crustaceans; added human beings, forestry, wildlife and wildlife resources to the interests protected; added a permit exception for species listed as injurious; and other purposes.

The Lacey Act was amended on May 22, 2008, when the Food, Conservation, and Energy Act of 2008 expanded its protection to a broader range of plants and plant products (Section 8204. Prevention of Illegal Logging Practices), largely championed by Senator Ron Wyden (D) Oregon, with some arguing that the motivation for the act was to protect US lumber jobs and the supply-chain reporting provisions encountered opposition from the wood industry including objections to the burden of reporting.

As a result, between 2009 and 2012 there was opposition to the bill, leading to the failed introduction of RELIEF Act (2011 H.R. 3210), which died in June 2012.

This issue attained media prominence in September 2011. House Speaker John Boehner cited the Gibson Guitar controversy in his response to a speech by President Barack Obama.

In 2022, the law was amended by the "Big Cat Public Safety Act" H.R. 263 to require owners of tigers, lions, and other large cats to have a license, and to prohibit public petting of large cats and their cubs.

== Enforcement actions ==
=== Gibson Guitar controversy ===
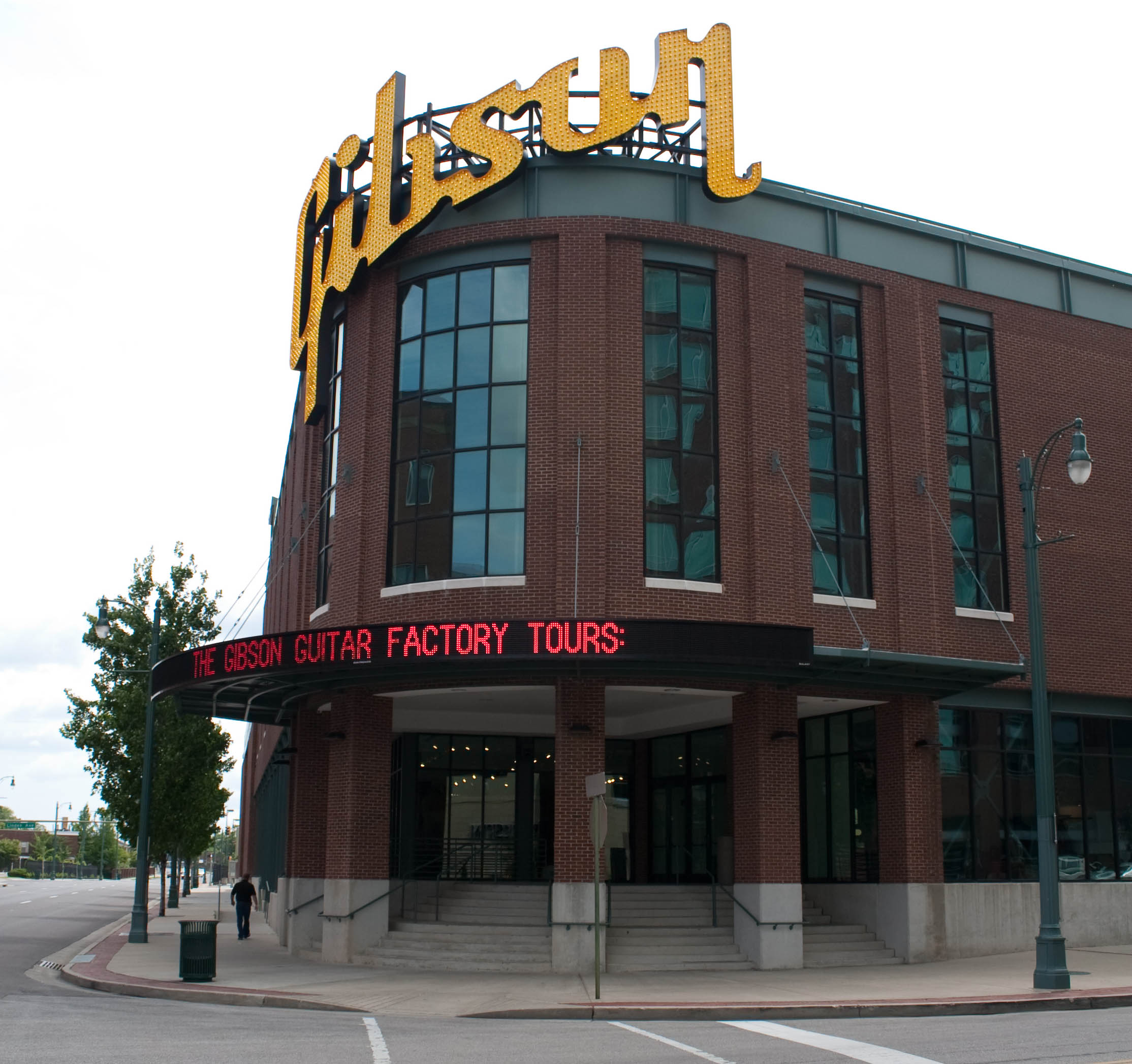
Gibson Guitar Factory in Memphis, Tennessee in May 2009

Gibson Guitar Corporation was raided twice by federal authorities, in 2009 and 2011. Federal prosecutors seized wood from Gibson facilities, alleging that Gibson had purchased smuggled Madagascar ebony and Indian rosewood. Gibson initially denied wrongdoing and insisted that the federal government was bullying them.

In August 2012, Gibson entered into a criminal enforcement agreement with the U.S. Department of Justice, admitting to violating the Lacey Act. The terms of the agreement required Gibson to pay a fine of $300,000 in addition to a $50,000 community payment, and to abide by the terms of the Lacey Act in the future.

=== Lumber Liquidators incident ===
For violating the Lacey Act, Lumber Liquidators was sentenced in 2016 to $7.8 million in criminal fines, $969,175 in criminal forfeiture and more than $1.23 million in community service payments for illegal lumber trafficking. The sentence also included five years of probation, and additional government oversight. The Department of Justice said it was the largest financial penalty ever issued under the Lacey Act.

== See also ==
- Weeks–McLean Act (Protection of migratory birds; 1913)
- Migratory Bird Treaty Act of 1918
- Hunting license
