= Carp =

Various species of cyprinid fishes

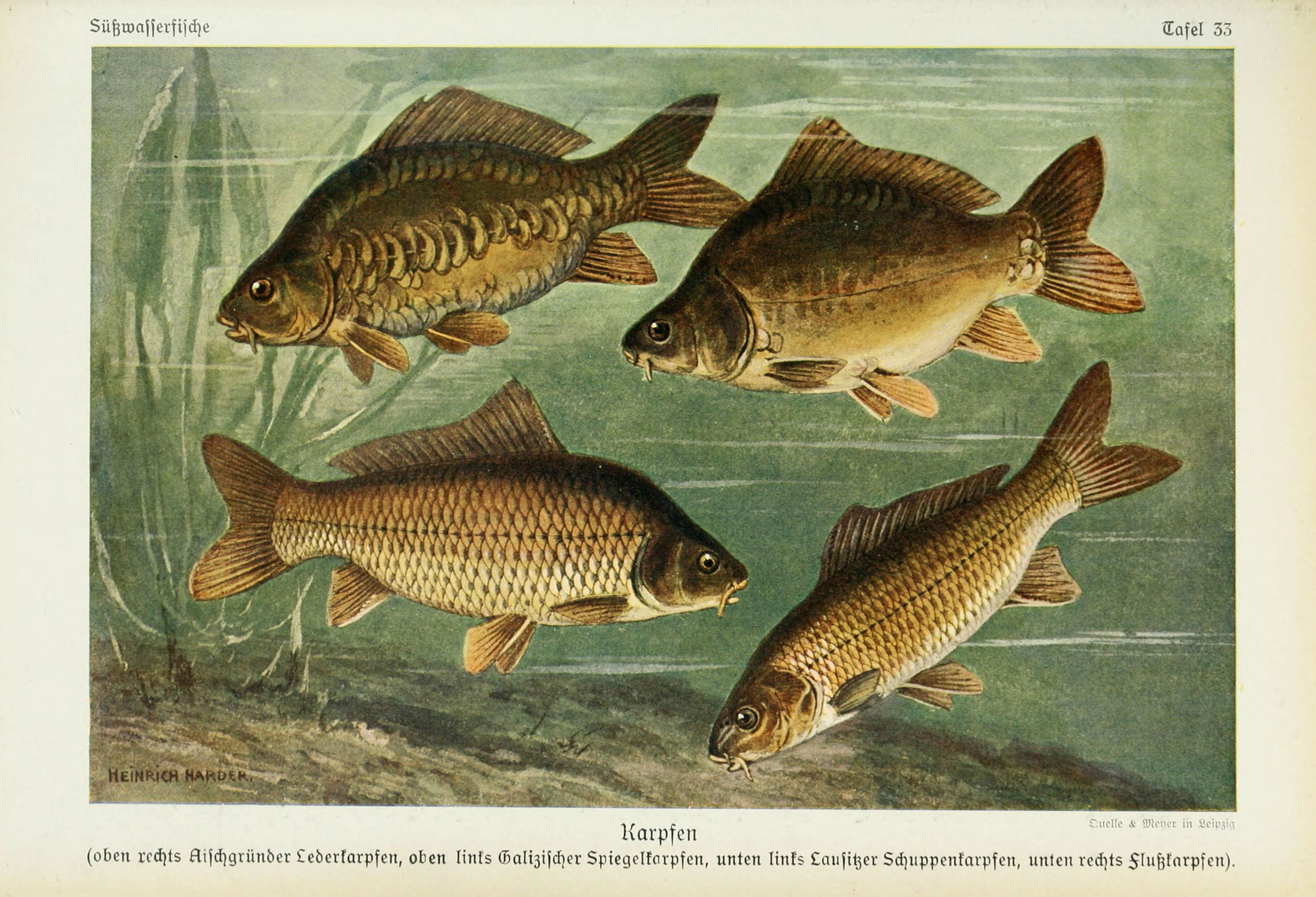
1913 illustration of Cyprinus carpio, better known as the common carp

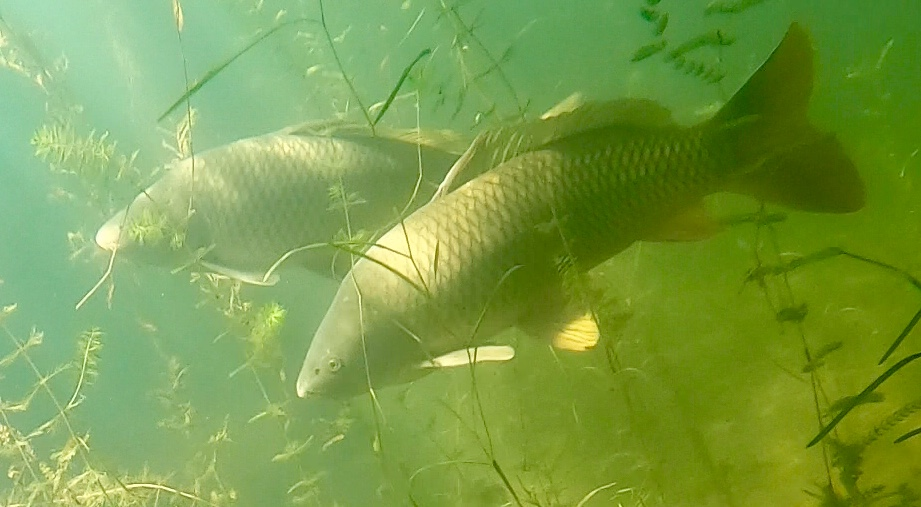
Common carp in Lake Minnetonka, Minnesota

The term carp (pl.: carp) is a generic common name for numerous species of freshwater fish from the family Cyprinidae, a very large clade of ray-finned fish mostly native to Eurasia. While carp are prized quarries and are valued (even commercially cultivated) as both food and ornamental fish in many parts of the Old World, they are considered trash fish and invasive pests in many parts of Africa, Australia and most of the United States.

== Biology ==
The Cypriniformes (family Cyprinidae) are traditionally grouped with the Characiformes, Siluriformes, Gonorynchiformes and Gymnotiformes to create the superorder Ostariophysi, since these groups share some common features. These features include being found predominantly in fresh water and possessing Weberian ossicles, an anatomical structure derived from the first five anterior-most vertebrae, and their corresponding ribs and neural crests.

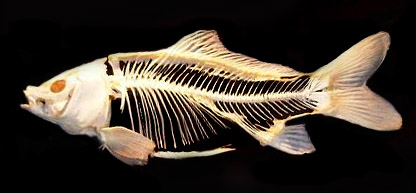
Cyprinus carpio skeleton

The third anterior-most pair of ribs is in contact with the extension of the labyrinth and the posterior with the swim bladder. The function is poorly understood, but this structure is presumed to take part in the transmission of vibrations from the swim bladder to the labyrinth and in the perception of sound, which would explain why the Ostariophysi have such a great capacity for hearing.

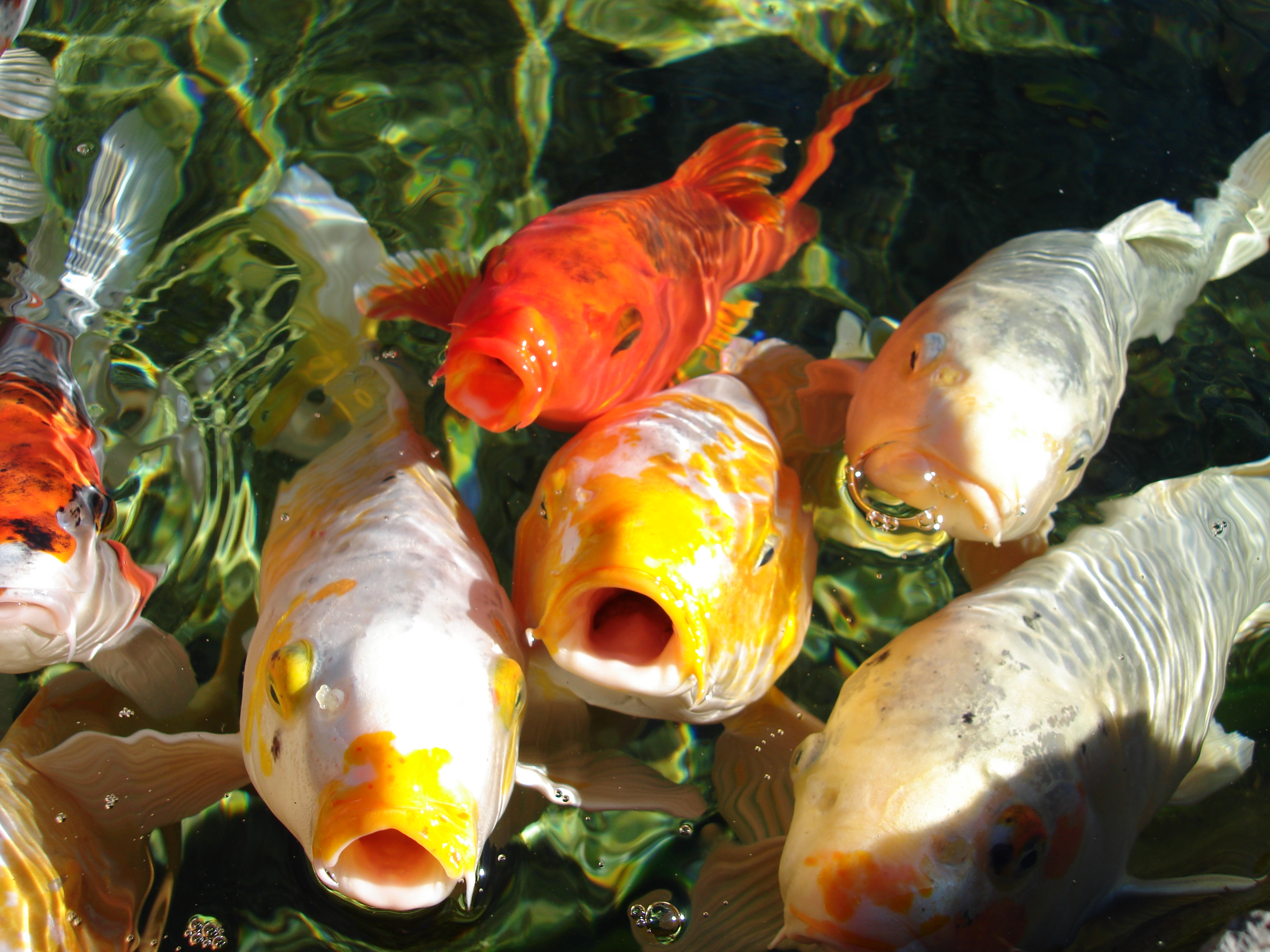
Cyprinus rubrofuscus (Amur carp) have been domesticated and bred in Japan since the early 19th century for ornamental purposes in their koi form.

Most Cypriniformes have scales and teeth on the inferior pharyngeal bones which may be modified in relation to the diet. Tribolodon is the only cyprinid genus which tolerates salt water. Several species move into brackish water but return to fresh water to spawn. All of the other Cypriniformes live in continental waters and have a wide geographical range. Some consider all cyprinid fishes carp, and the family Cyprinidae itself is often known as the carp family.

In colloquial use, carp usually refers only to several larger cyprinid species such as Cyprinus carpio (common carp), Carassius carassius (crucian carp), Ctenopharyngodon idella (grass carp), Hypophthalmichthys molitrix (silver carp), and Hypophthalmichthys nobilis (bighead carp). Common carp are native to both Eastern Europe and Western Asia, so they are sometimes called "Eurasian" carp.

Carp have long been an important food fish to humans. Several species such as the various goldfish (Carassius auratus) breeds and the domesticated common carp variety known as koi (Cyprinus rubrofuscus var. "koi") have been popular ornamental fishes. As a result, carp have been introduced to various locations, though with mixed results. Several species of carp are considered invasive species in the United States, and, worldwide, large sums of money are spent on carp control.

At least some species of carp are able to survive for months with practically no oxygen (for example under ice or in stagnant, scummy water) by metabolizing glycogen to form lactic acid which is then converted into ethanol and carbon dioxide. The ethanol diffuses into the surrounding water through the gills.

== Species ==
Some prominent carp in the family Cyprinidae
Common name	Scientific name	Max length (cm)	Common length (cm)	Max weight (kg)	Max age (yr)	Trophic level	Fish Base	FAO	ITIS	IUCN status
Silver carp	Hypophthalmichthys molitrix (Valenciennes, 1844)	105	18	50		2.0				Near threatened
Common carp (European carp)	Cyprinus carpio (Linnaeus, 1758)	110	31	40.1	38	3.0				Least concern
Grass carp	Ctenopharyngodon idella (Valenciennes, 1844)	150	10.7	45.0	21	2.0				Not assessed
Bighead carp	Hypophthalmichthys nobilis (Richardson, 1845)	146	60	40.0	20	2.3				Data deficient
Crucian carp	Carassius carassius (Linnaeus, 1758)	64	15	3.0	10	3.1				Least concern
Catla carp (Indian carp)	Cyprinus catla (Hamilton, 1822)	182		38.6		2.8				Least concern
Mrigal carp	Cirrhinus cirrhosus (Bloch, 1795)	100	40	12.7		2.5				Vulnerable
Black carp	Mylopharyngodon piceus (Richardson, 1846)	122	12.2	35	13	3.2				Not assessed
Mud carp	Cirrhinus molitorella (Valenciennes, 1844)	55.0	15.2	0.50		2.0				Near threatened
Caspian roach	Rutilus caspicus (Yakovlev, 1870)	45	32.5	2						Least concern

== Recreational fishing ==
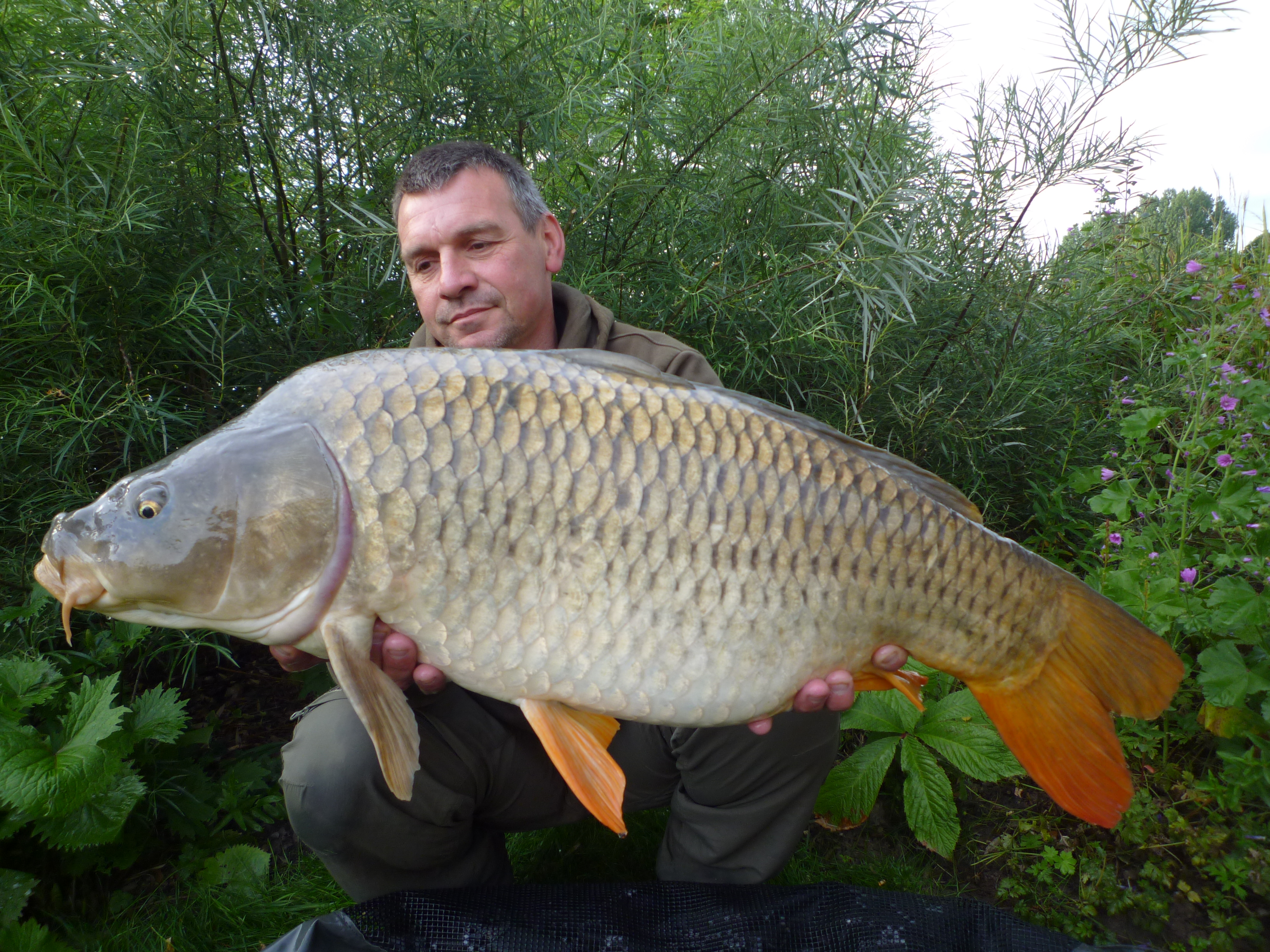
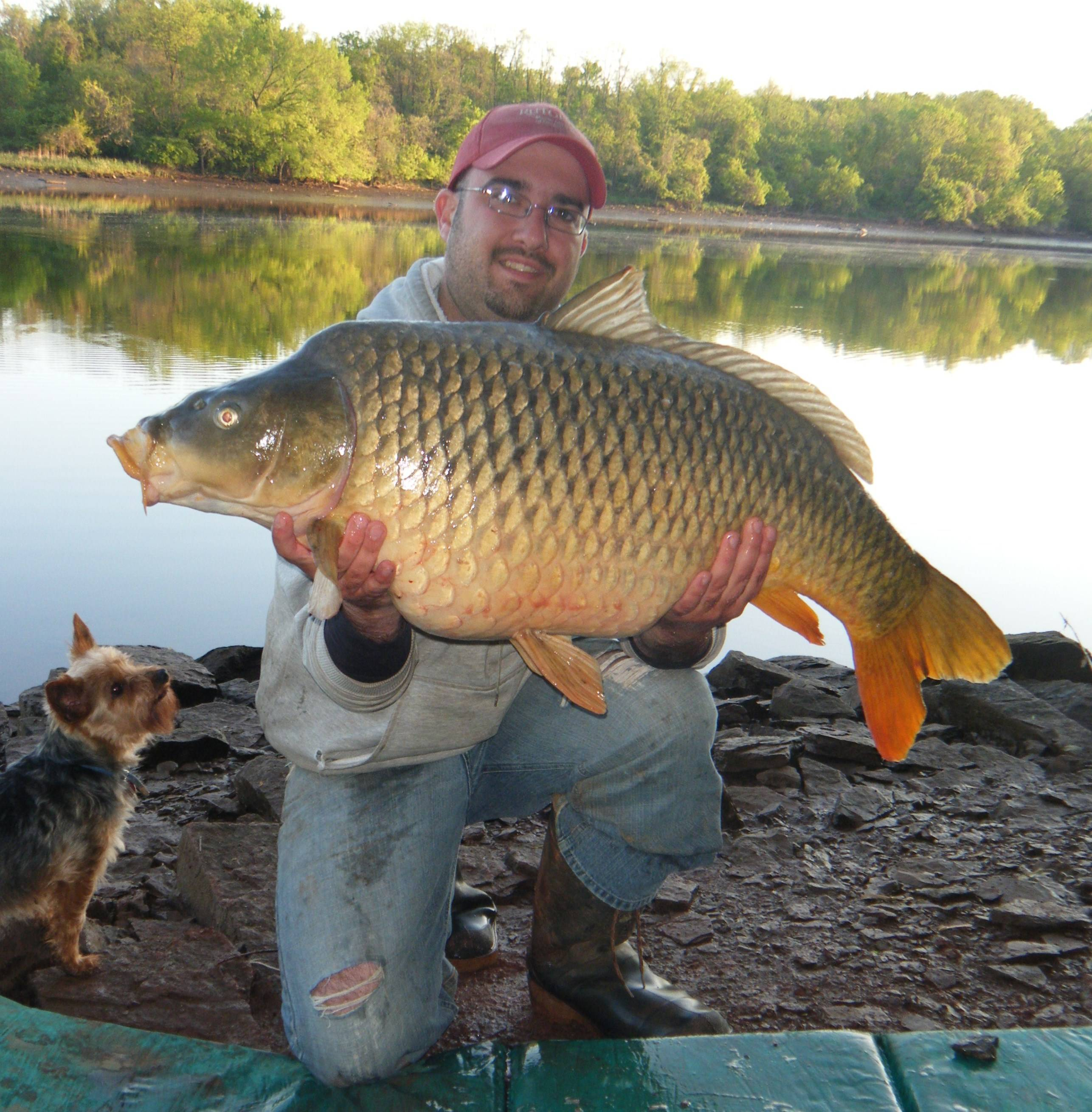
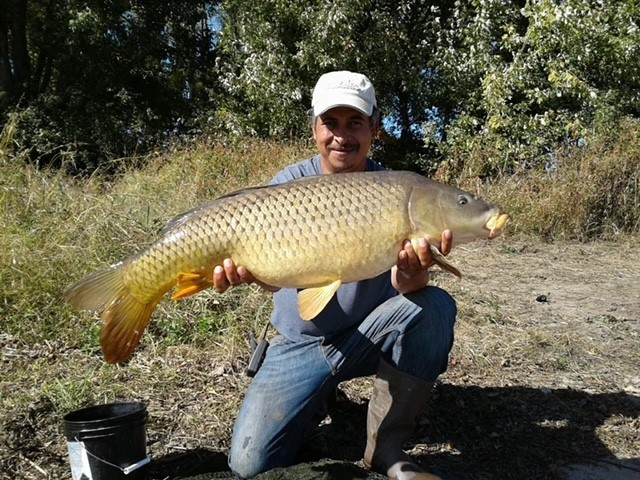
Anglers posing with very large carp

In 1653 Izaak Walton wrote in The Compleat Angler, "The Carp is the queen of rivers; a stately, a good, and a very subtle fish; that was not at first bred, nor hath been long in England, but is now naturalised."

Carp are variable in terms of angling value.

- In Europe, even when not fished for food, they are eagerly sought by anglers, being considered highly prized coarse fish that are difficult to hook. The UK has a thriving carp angling market, with the British record for the heaviest carp being 68lb 1oz. It is the fastest growing angling market in the UK, and has spawned a number of specialised carp angling publications such as Carpology, Advanced carp fishing, Carpworld and Total Carp, and informative carp angling web sites, such as Carpfishing UK and Carp Squad.
- In the United States, carp are also classified as a rough fish, as well as a damaging naturalized exotic species, but with sporting qualities. Carp have long suffered from a poor reputation in the United States as undesirable for angling or for the table, especially since they are typically an invasive species out-competing more desirable local game fish. Nonetheless, many states' departments of natural resources are beginning to view the carp as an angling fish instead of a maligned pest. Groups such as Wild Carp Companies, American Carp Society, and the Carp Anglers Group promote the sport and work with fisheries departments to organize events to introduce and expose others to the unique opportunity the carp offers freshwater anglers. The common carp is one of the most abundant species of carp found in most rivers, creeks, lakes, and ponds throughout the Midwest region of the United States. Common carp are a particularly strong fish that fight hard on the end of anglers' lines, making them an appealing target for recreational fishermen. Since its introduction to the waters of the United States in the 1880s these fish have been viewed as a game fish, despite the fact that they are a destructive, and invasive species.

== Aquaculture ==
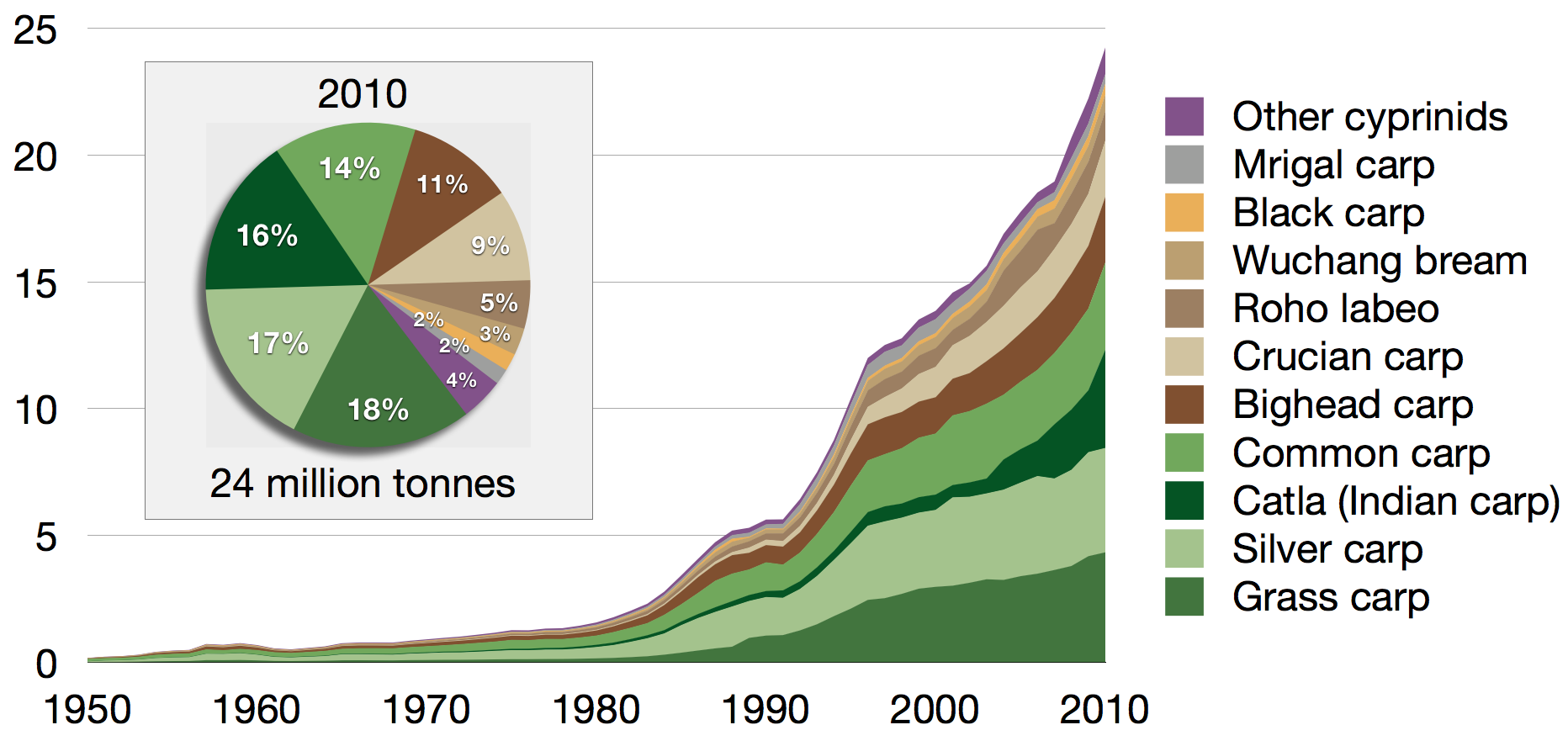
Aquaculture production of cyprinids by species in million tonnes, 1950–2010, as reported by the FAO

Various species of carp have been domesticated and reared as food fish across Europe and Asia for thousands of years. These various species appear to have been domesticated independently, as they are native to different parts of Eurasia. Aquaculture has been pursued in China for at least 2,400 years. A tract by Fan Li in the fifth century BC details many of the ways carp were raised in ponds. The common carp (Cyprinus carpio) is originally from Central Europe. Several carp species (collectively known as Asian carp) were domesticated in East Asia. Carp that are originally from South Asia, for example catla (Gibelion catla), rohu (Labeo rohita) and mrigal (Cirrhinus cirrhosus), are known as Indian carp. Their hardiness and adaptability have allowed domesticated species to be propagated all around the world.

Although carp was an important aquatic food item, as more fish species have become readily available for the table, the importance of carp culture in Western Europe has diminished. Demand has declined, partly due to the appearance of more desirable table fish such as trout and salmon through intensive farming, and environmental constraints. However, fish production in ponds is still a major form of aquaculture in Central and Eastern Europe, including the Russian Federation, where most of the production comes from low or intermediate-intensity ponds. In Asia, the farming of carp continues to surpass the total amount of farmed fish volume of intensively sea-farmed species, such as salmon and tuna.

== Breeding ==
Selective breeding programs for the common carp include improvement in growth, shape, and resistance to disease. Experiments carried out in the USSR used crossings of broodstocks to increase genetic diversity, and then selected the species for traits such as growth rate, exterior traits and viability, and/or adaptation to environmental conditions such as variations in temperature. From these experiments Ropsha hybrid carp were developed, for traits such as tolerance to cold. An increase in growth rate was observed in the second generation in Vietnam, Moav and Wohlfarth (1976) showed positive results when selecting for slower growth for three generations compared to selecting for faster growth. Schaperclaus (1962) showed resistance to the dropsy disease wherein selected lines suffered low mortality (11.5%) compared to unselected (57%).

The major carp species used traditionally in Chinese aquaculture are the black, grass, silver and bighead carp. In the 1950s, the Pearl River Fishery Research Institute in China made a technological breakthrough in the induced breeding of these carps, which resulted in a rapid expansion of freshwater aquaculture in China. In the late 1990s, scientists at the Chinese Academy of Fishery Sciences developed a new variant of the common carp called the Jian carp (Cyprinus carpio var. Jian). This fish grows rapidly and has a high feed conversion rate. Over 50% of the total aquaculture production of carp in China has now converted to Jian carp.

The major traditional aquaculture carp of China
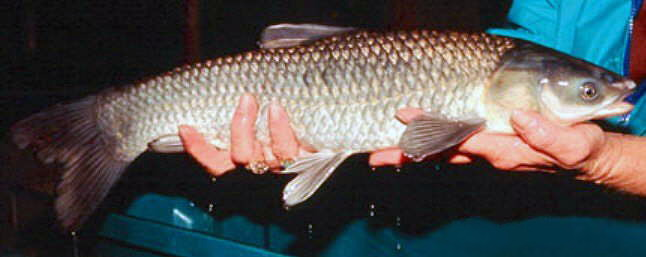
Black carp

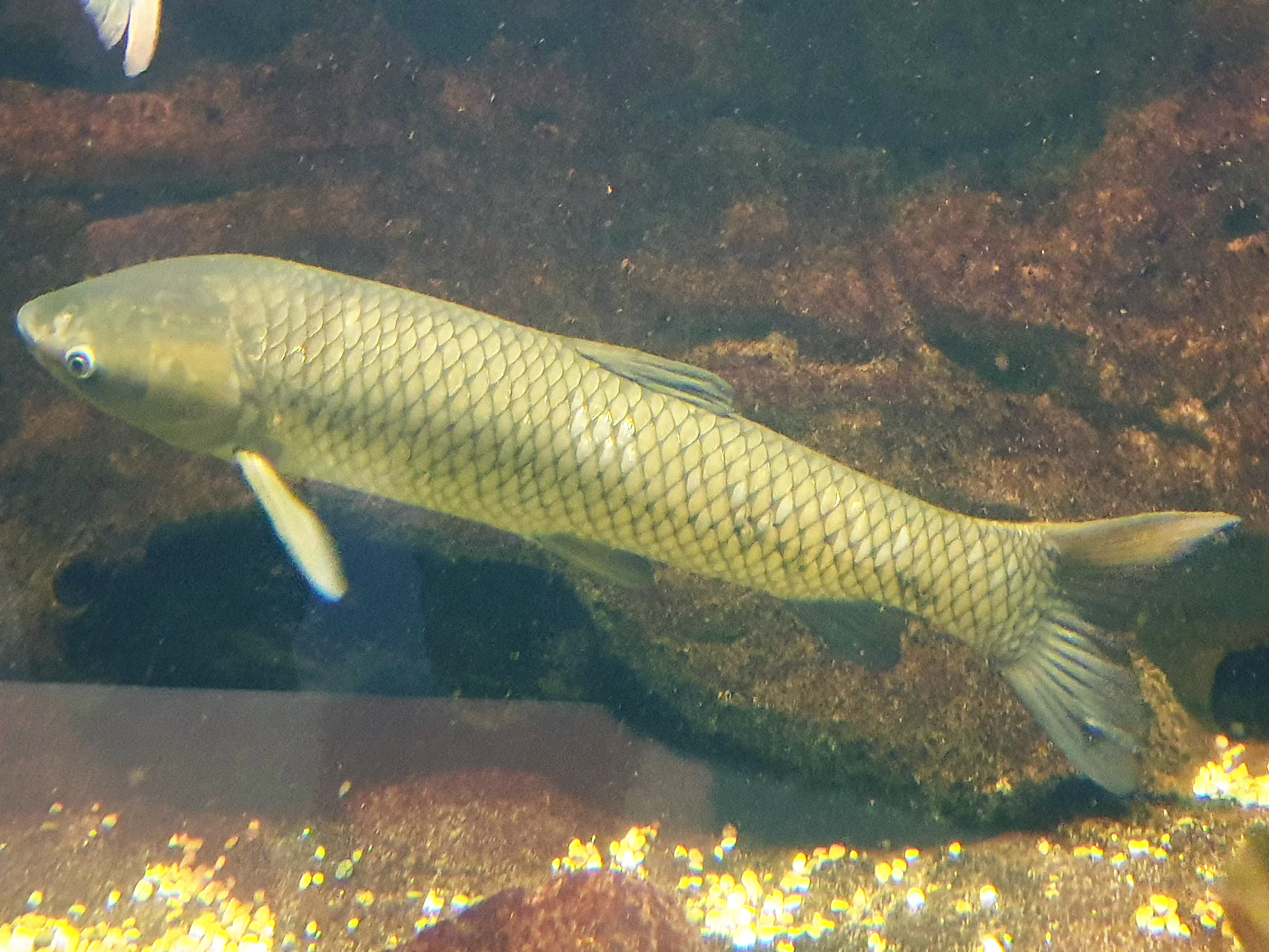
Grass carp

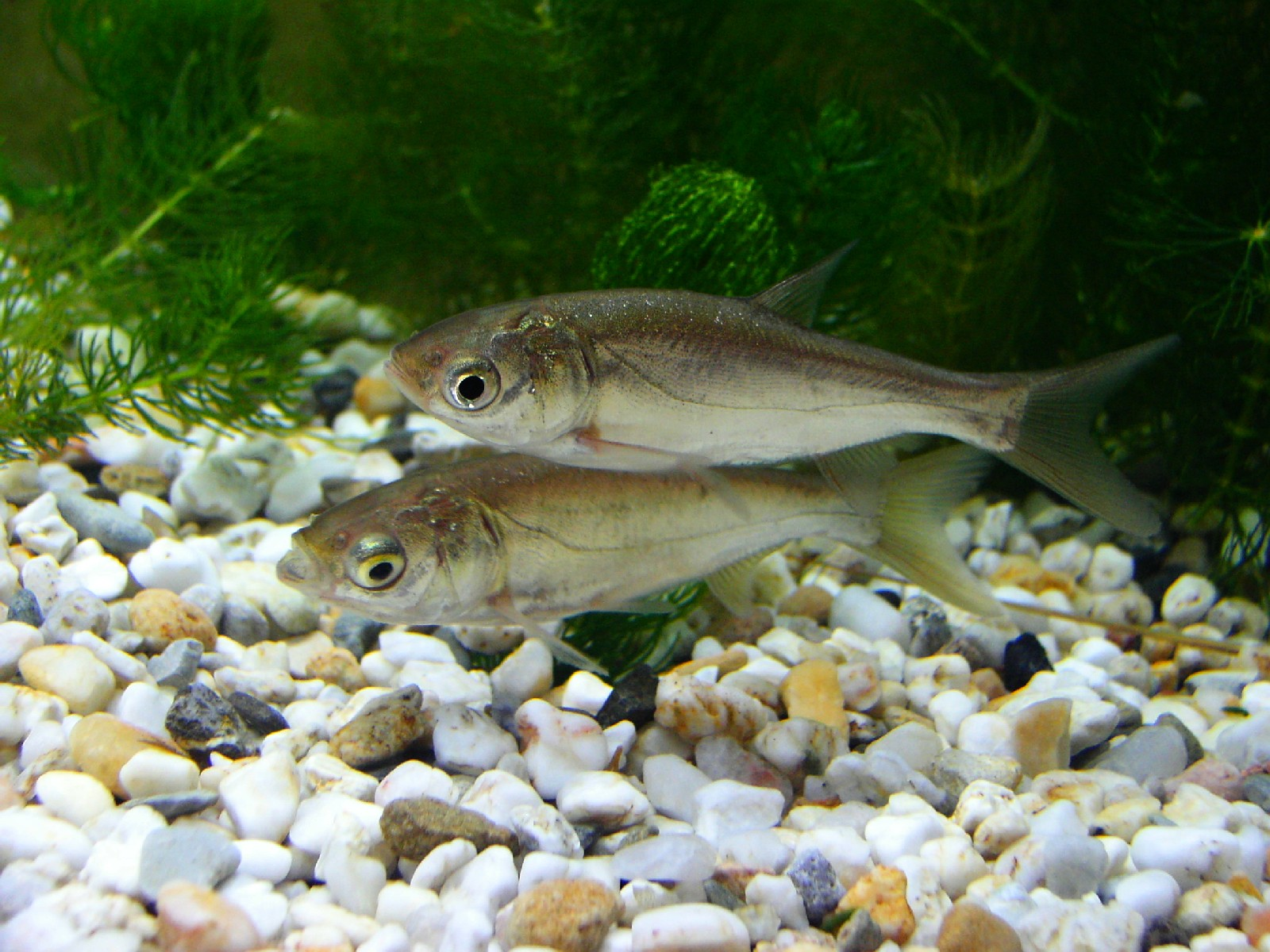
Silver carp

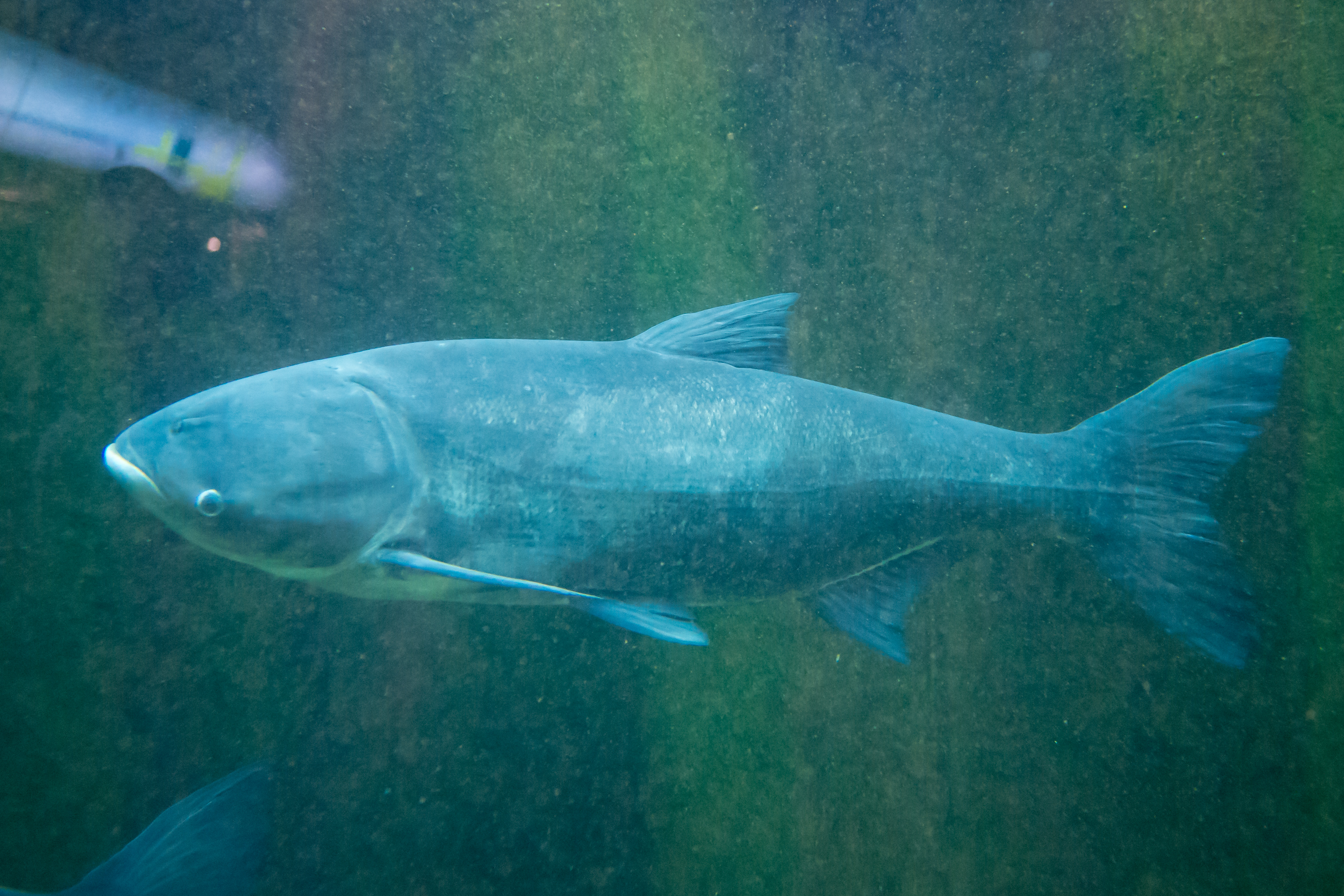
Bighead carp

== As ornamental fish ==
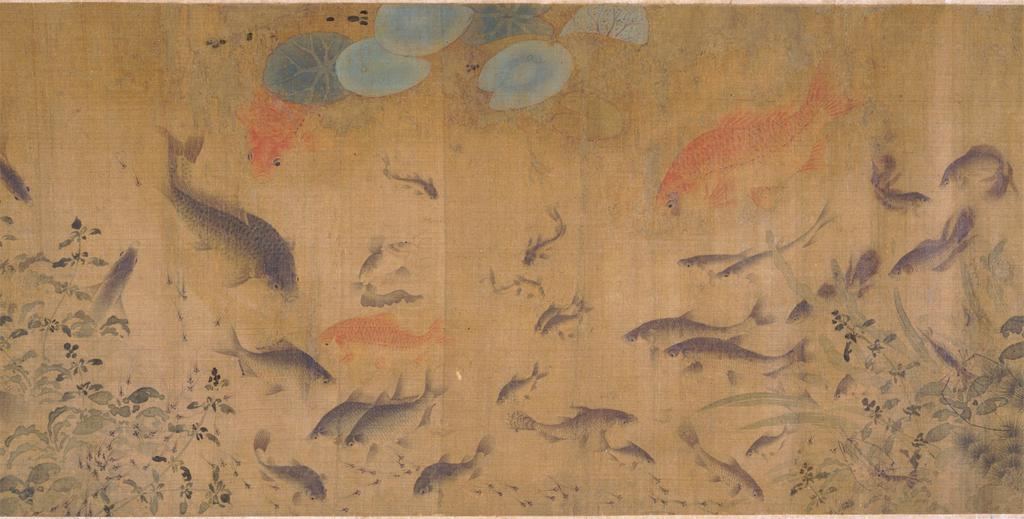
Goldfish and other carp from Fish Swimming Amid Falling Flowers, a Song dynasty painting by Liu Cai (c. 1080–1120)

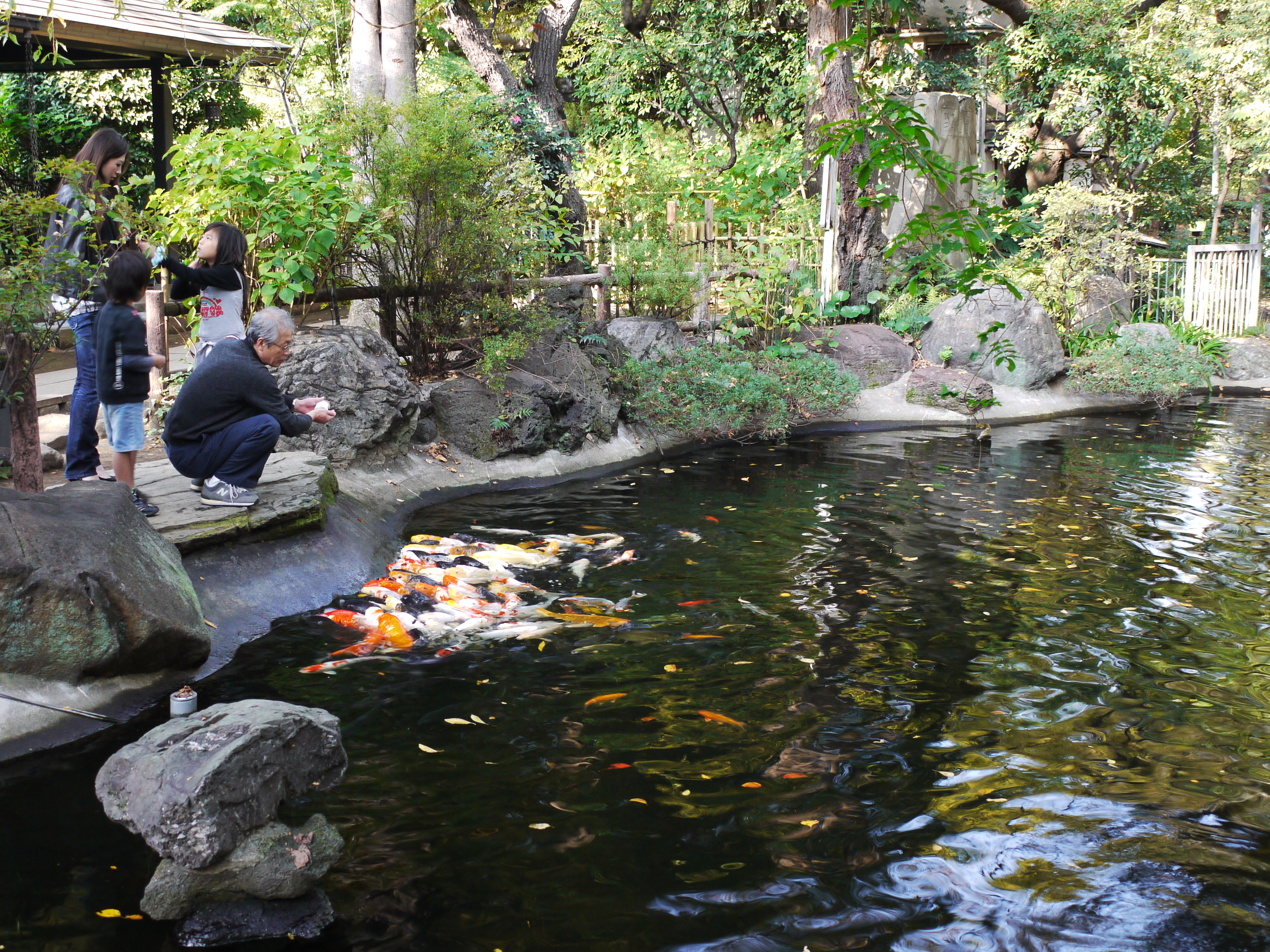
Man feeding a shoal of koi at Atago Shrine in Minato, Tokyo, Japan

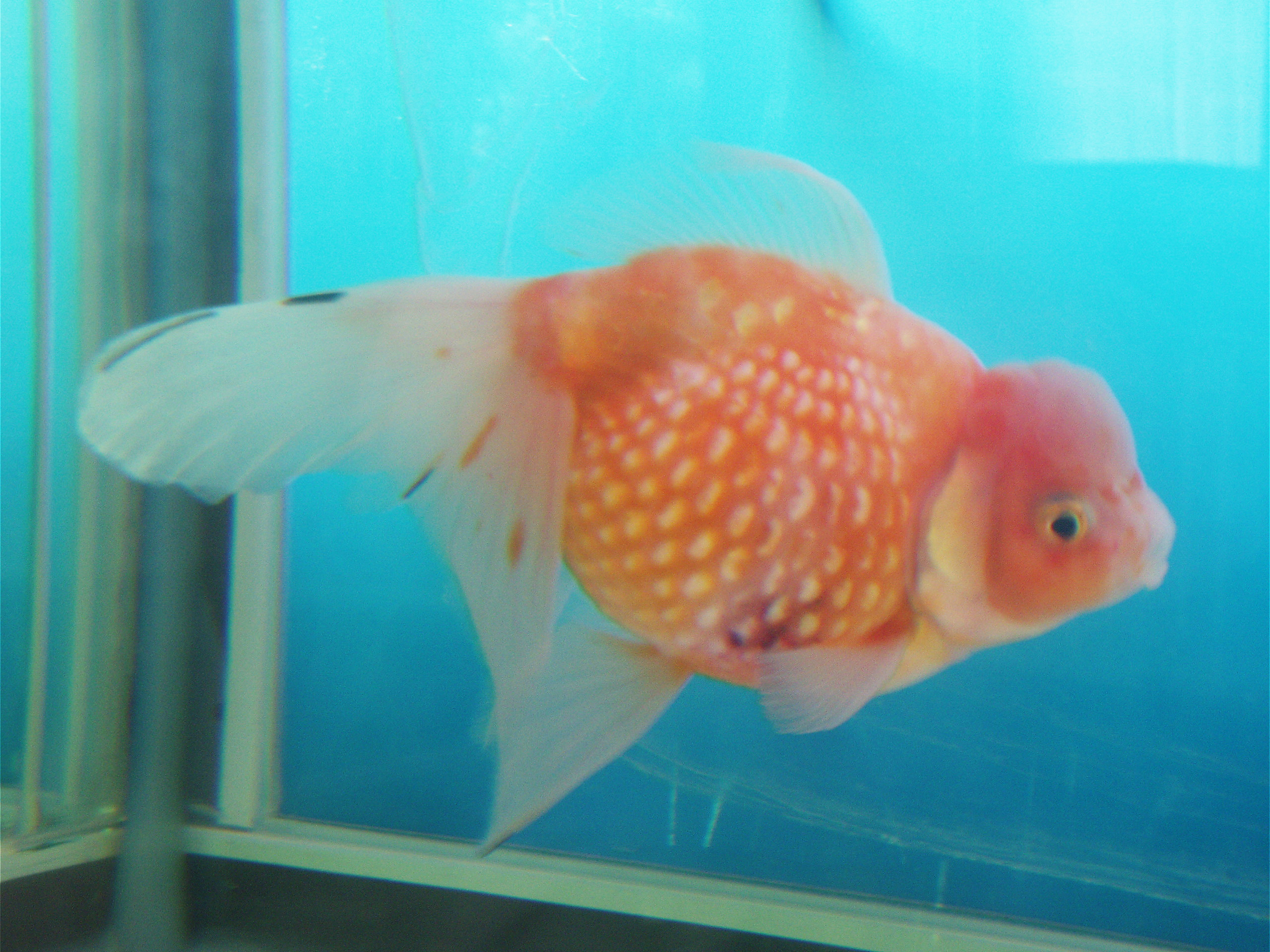
An oranda-type variegated pearlscale

Carp, along with many of their cyprinid relatives, are popular ornamental aquarium and pond fish.

Ornamental goldfish were originally domesticated from their wild form, a dark greyish-brown carp native to Asia, but may have been influenced by Carassius carassius and Carassius gibelio. They were first bred for color in China over a thousand years ago. Due to selective breeding, goldfish have been developed into many distinct breeds, and are found in various colors, color patterns, forms and sizes far different from those of the original carp. Goldfish were kept as ornamental fish in China for thousands of years before being introduced to Japan in 1603, and to Europe in 1611.

Nishikigoi, better known simply as koi, are a domesticated varieties of common carp and Amur carp (Cyprinus rubrofuscus) that have been selectively bred for color. The common carp was introduced from China to Japan, where selective breeding in the 1820s in the Niigata region resulted in koi. In Japanese culture, koi are treated with affection, and seen as good luck. They are popular in other parts of the world as outdoor pond fish.

== As food ==
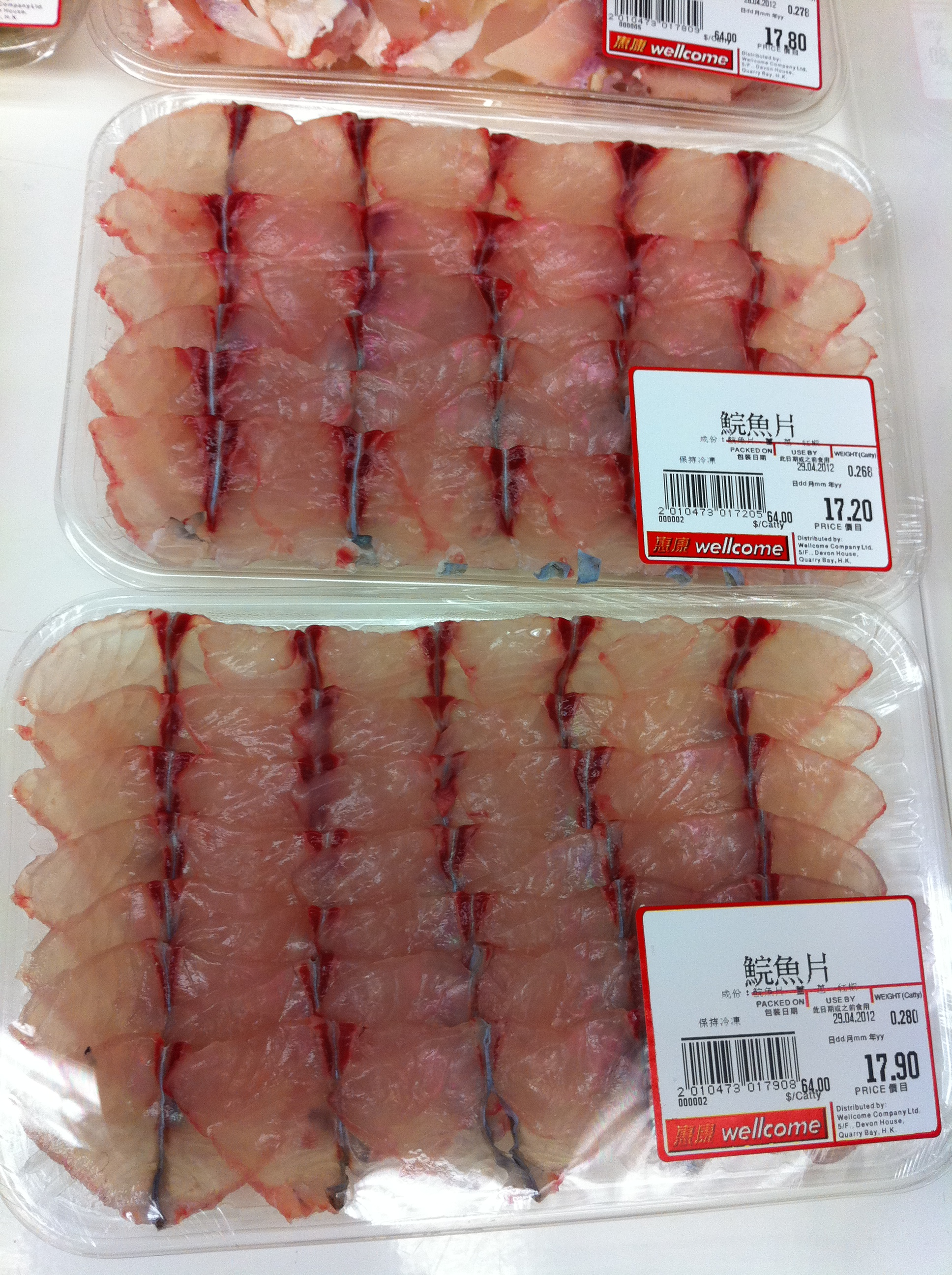
Slices of grass carp fillets for sale at a supermarket in Hong Kong

- Bighead carp is enjoyed in many parts of the world, but it has not become a popular food fish in North America. Acceptance has been hindered in part by the name "carp", and its association with the common carp which is not a generally favored fish to be eaten in North America. The flesh of the bighead carp is white and firm, different from that of the common carp, which is darker and richer. Bighead carp flesh shares one similarity with common carp flesh – both have intramuscular bones within the filet. However, bighead carp captured from the wild in the United States tend to be much larger than common carp, so the intramuscular bones are also larger and thus less problematic.
- Common carp, breaded and fried, is part of traditional Christmas Eve dinners in Slovakia, Poland, the eastern part of Croatia and in the Czech Republic. In pond based water agriculture it is treated as the most prominent food fish. Some recipes are specifically for carp such as "sweet-and-sour carp" (Chinese: 糖醋鯉魚; pinyin: Tángcù Lǐyú) and "thick miso soup with carp" (Japanese: 鯉こく, romanized: Koikoku).
- Crucian carp is considered the best-tasting pan fish in Poland. It is known as karaś, and is served traditionally with sour cream (karasie w śmietanie). In Russia, this particular species is called Золотой карась, meaning 'golden crucian'. It is one of the fish used in a borscht recipe called borshch s karasej.
- Mud carp, due to the low cost of production, is mainly consumed by the poor, locally; it is mostly sold alive, but can be dried and salted. Carp aquaculture has become an important industry worldwide, particularly in Asia where carp farming provides a significant source of protein for both human consumption and aquaculture feed production. An important food fish in Guangdong Province, it is also cultured in this area and Taiwan. Mud carp is sometimes canned or processed as fish cakes, fish balls, or dumplings, as used in Cantonese and Shunde cuisines. It can be combined with douchi or Chinese fermented black beans in a dish called fried dace with salted black beans. It can be served cooked with vegetables such as Chinese cabbage.
- Fisherman's soup.
- Kuai.
- Taramosalata.
- Masgouf, a popular Iraqi dish consisting of seasoned, grilled carp.
- Gefilte fish, an Ashkenazi Jewish dish made from a poached mixture of ground deboned fish, primarily carp, whitefish, and pike.

=== Gallery ===
Carp-based dishes

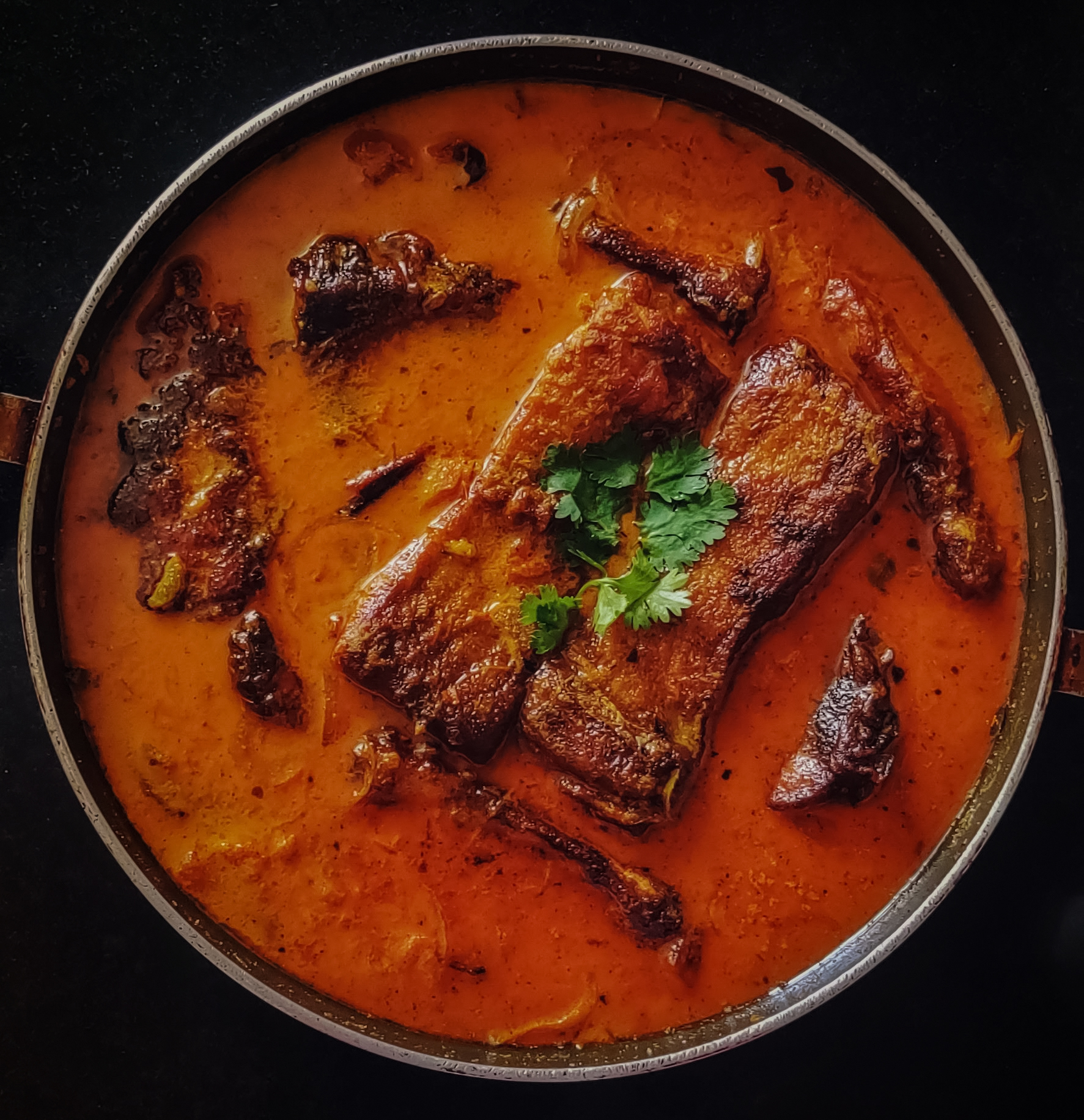
Catla kalia – a popular fish curry preparation from West Bengal, India

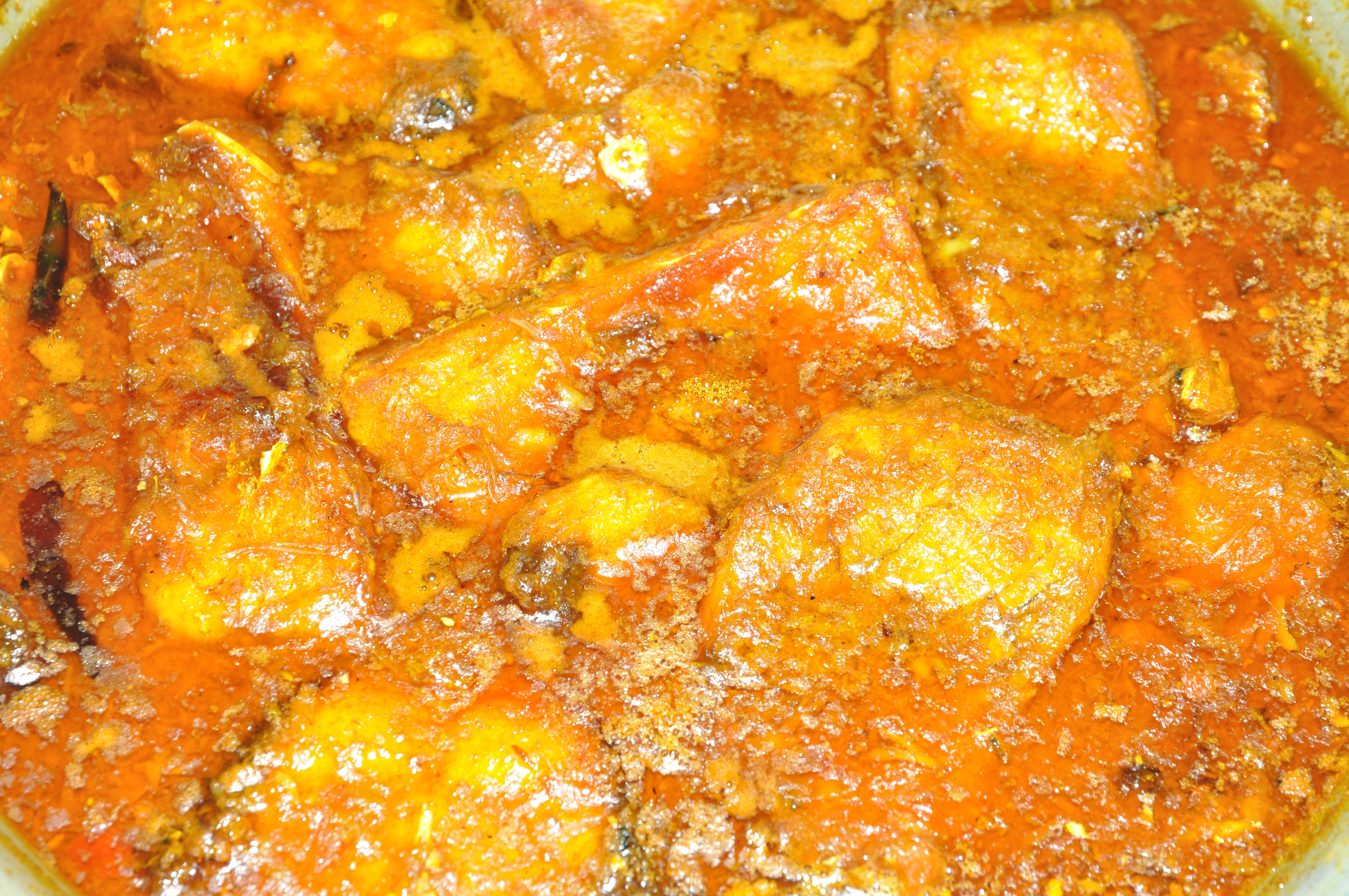
Carp curry, India

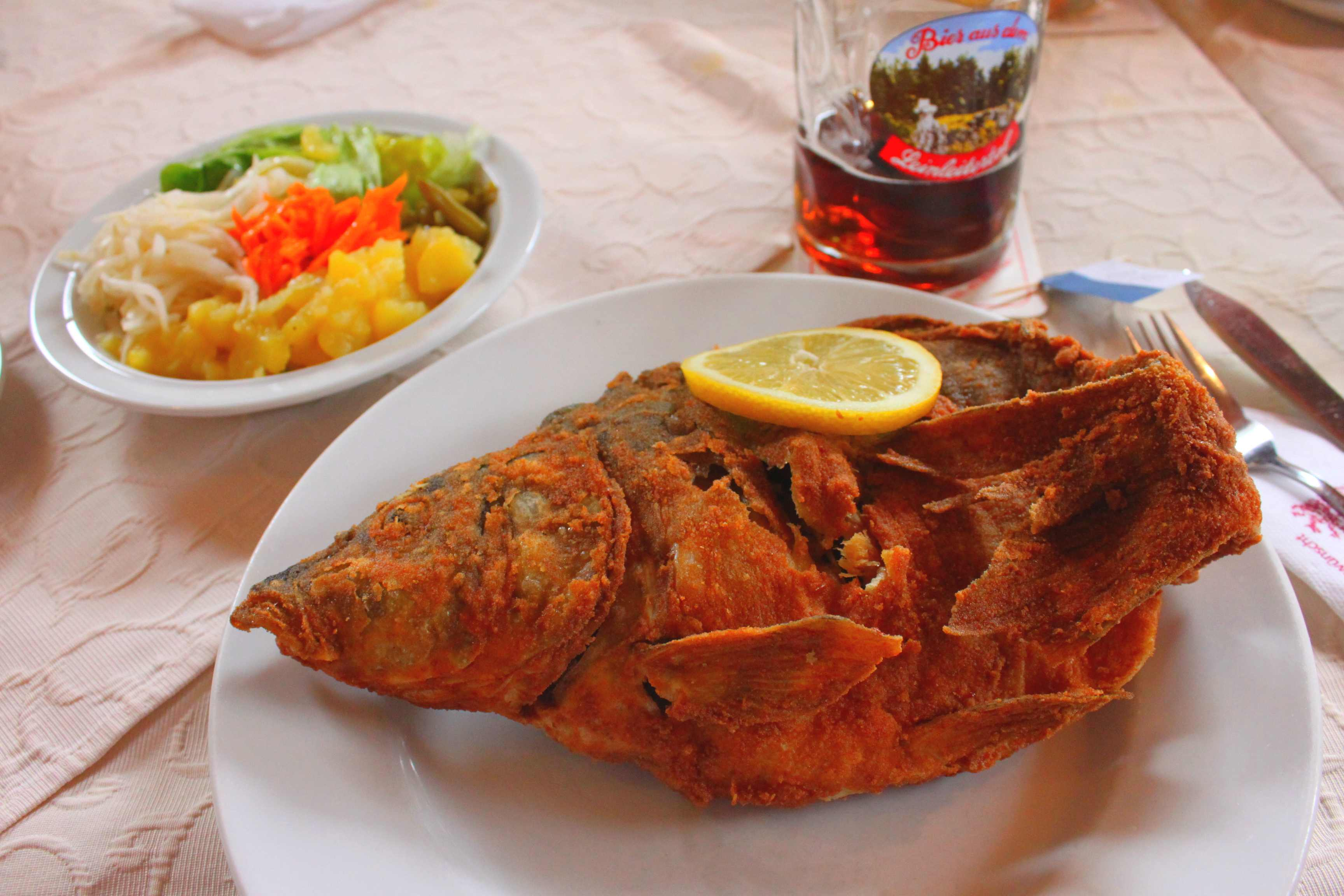
Fried carp from Franconia, Germany

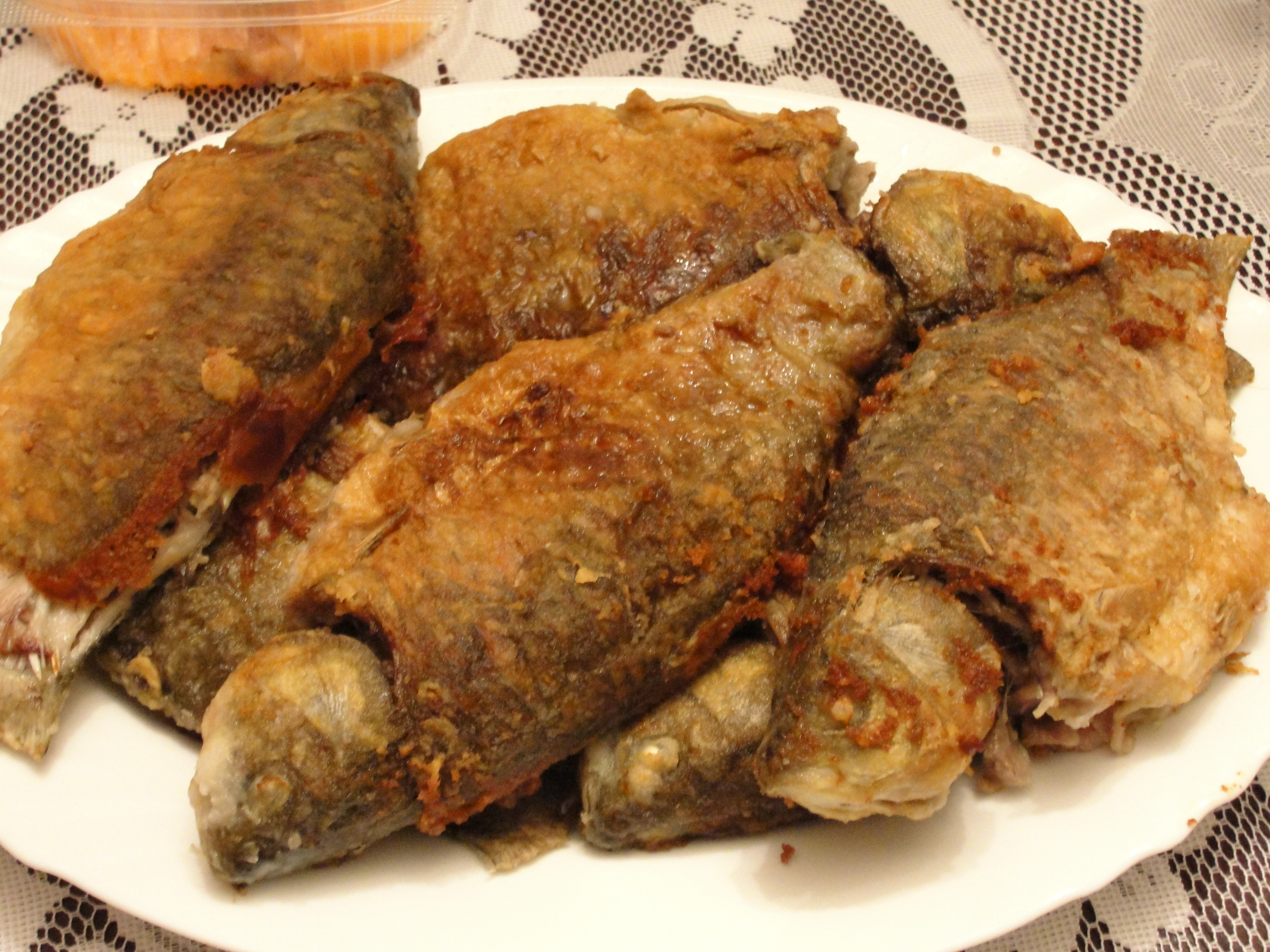
Pan-fried Crucian carp, Russia

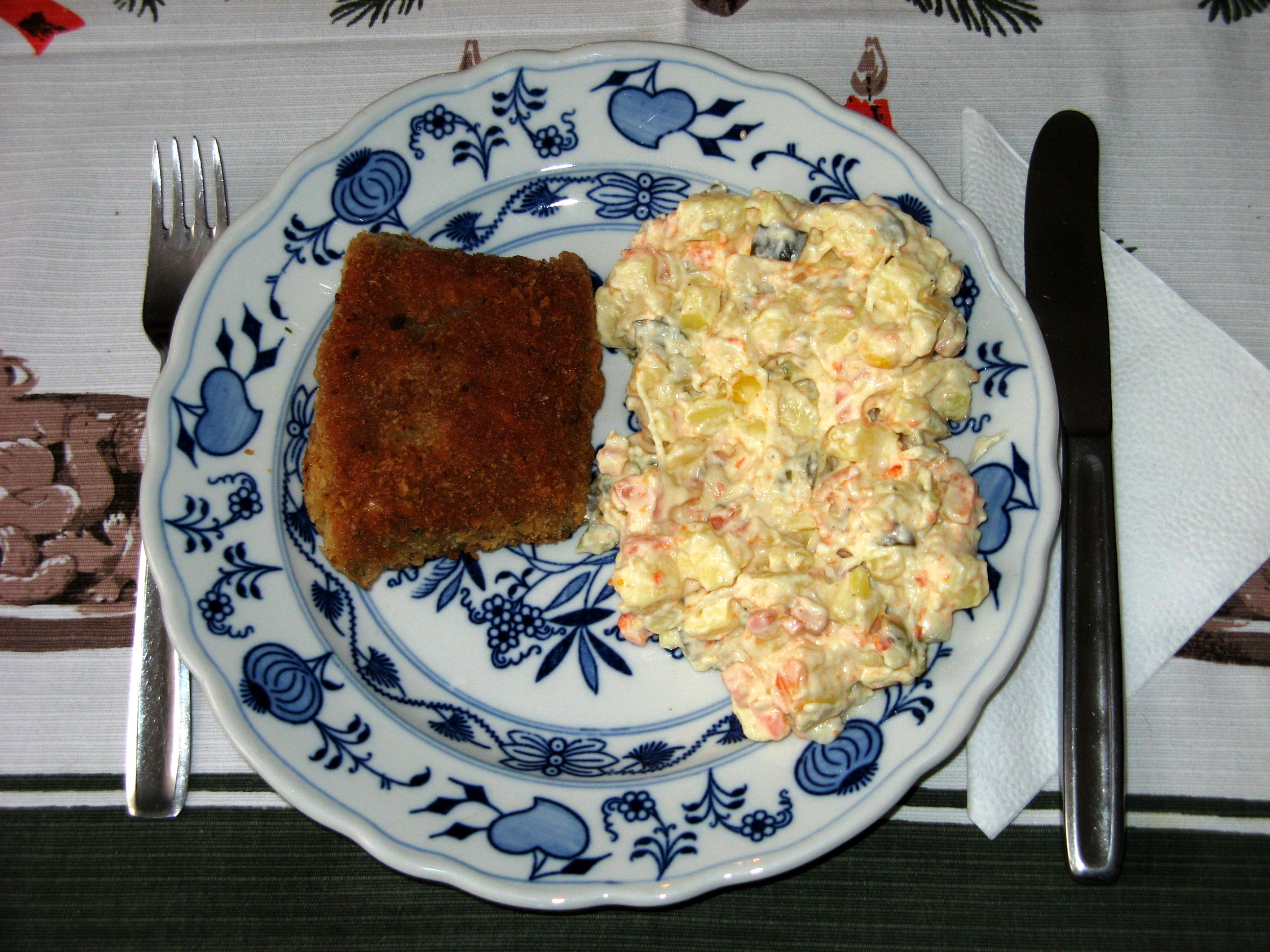
Traditional Christmas dinner – fried carp with potato salad, Czech Republic

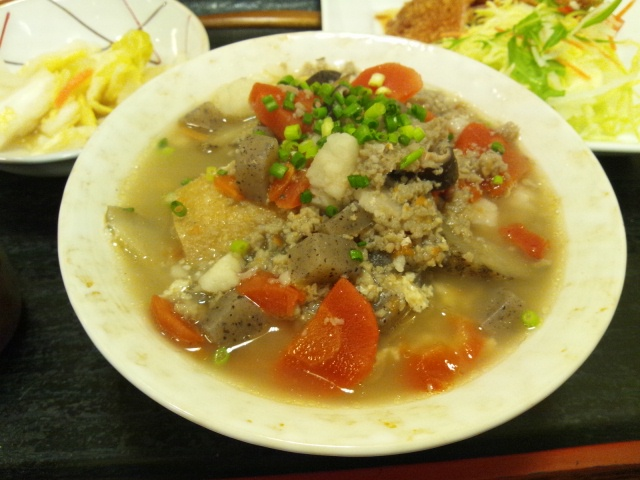
Stir-fried Crucian carp with rice, Japan

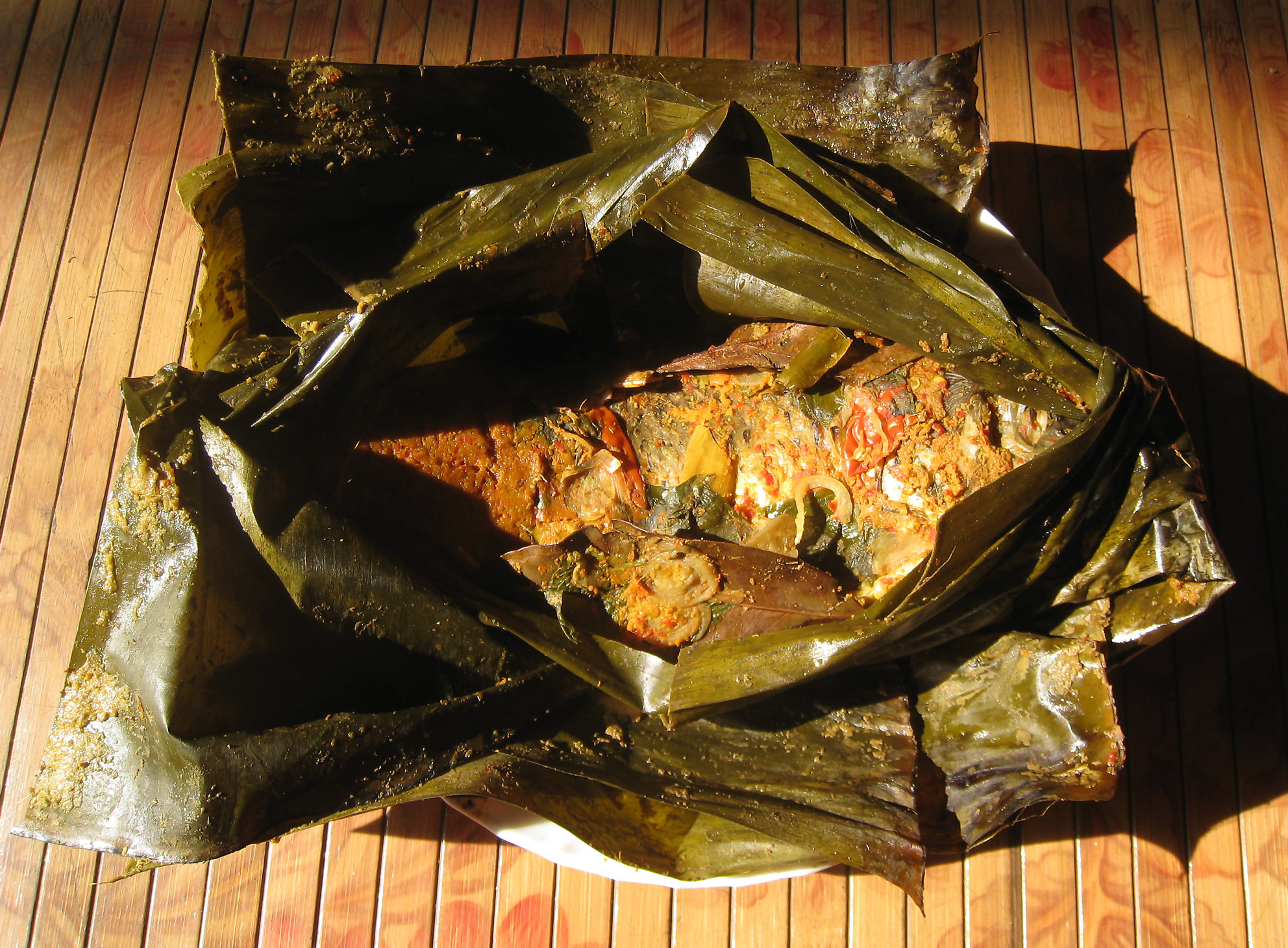
Carp fish in spices and herbs cooked in a banana leaf, Sundanese

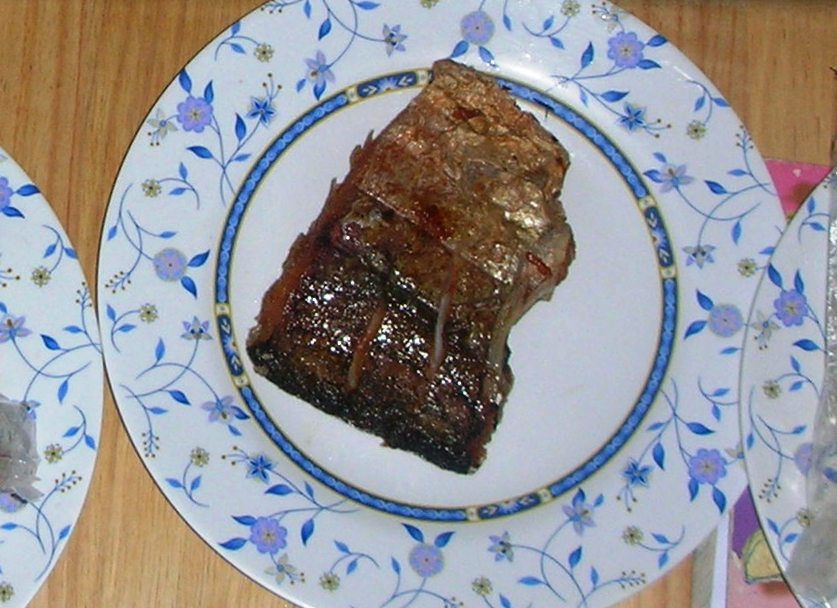
Deep-fried chunk of pickled (pla som) silver barb (Pla taphian)

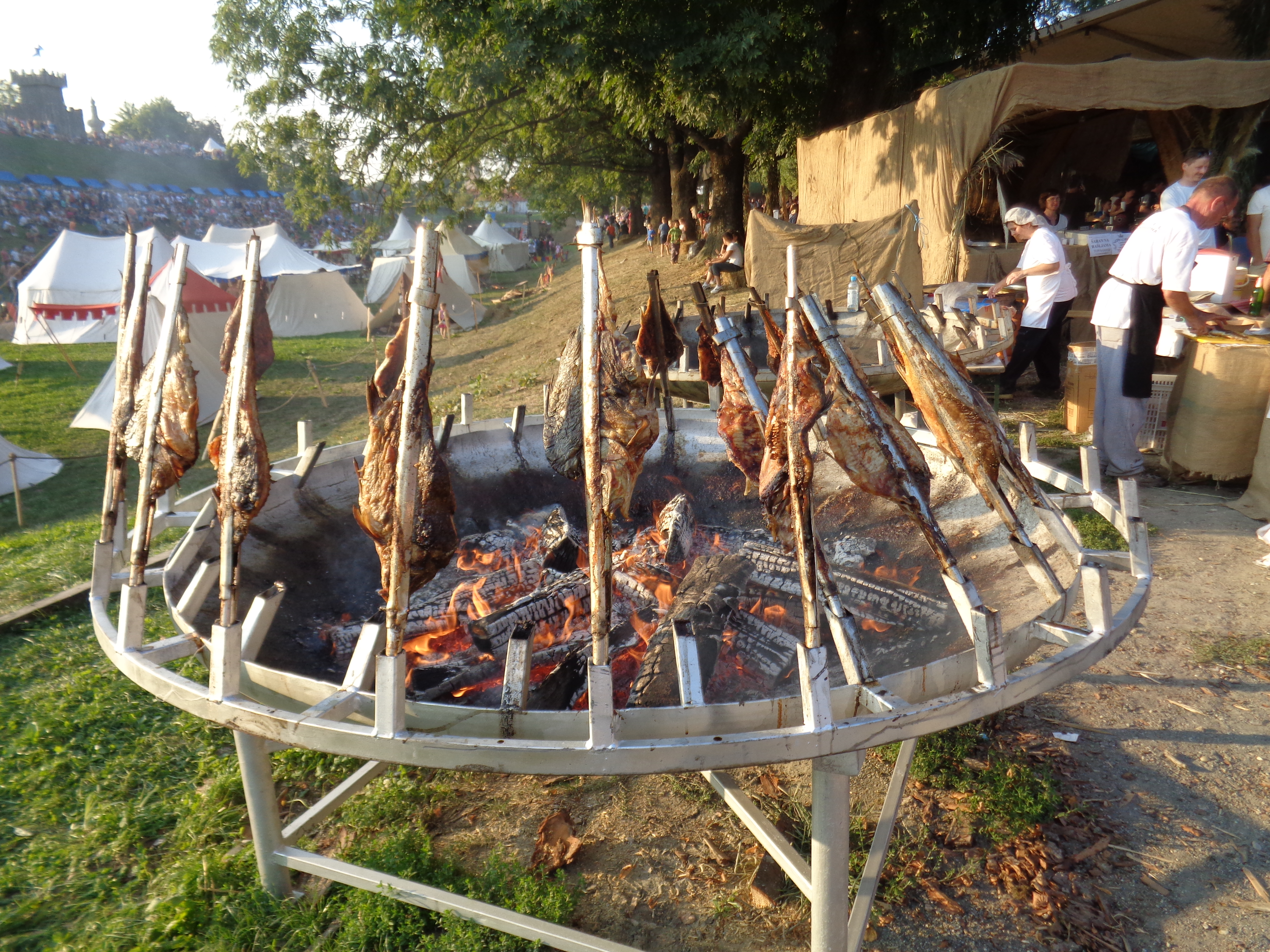
Barbecued carp, northern Croatia

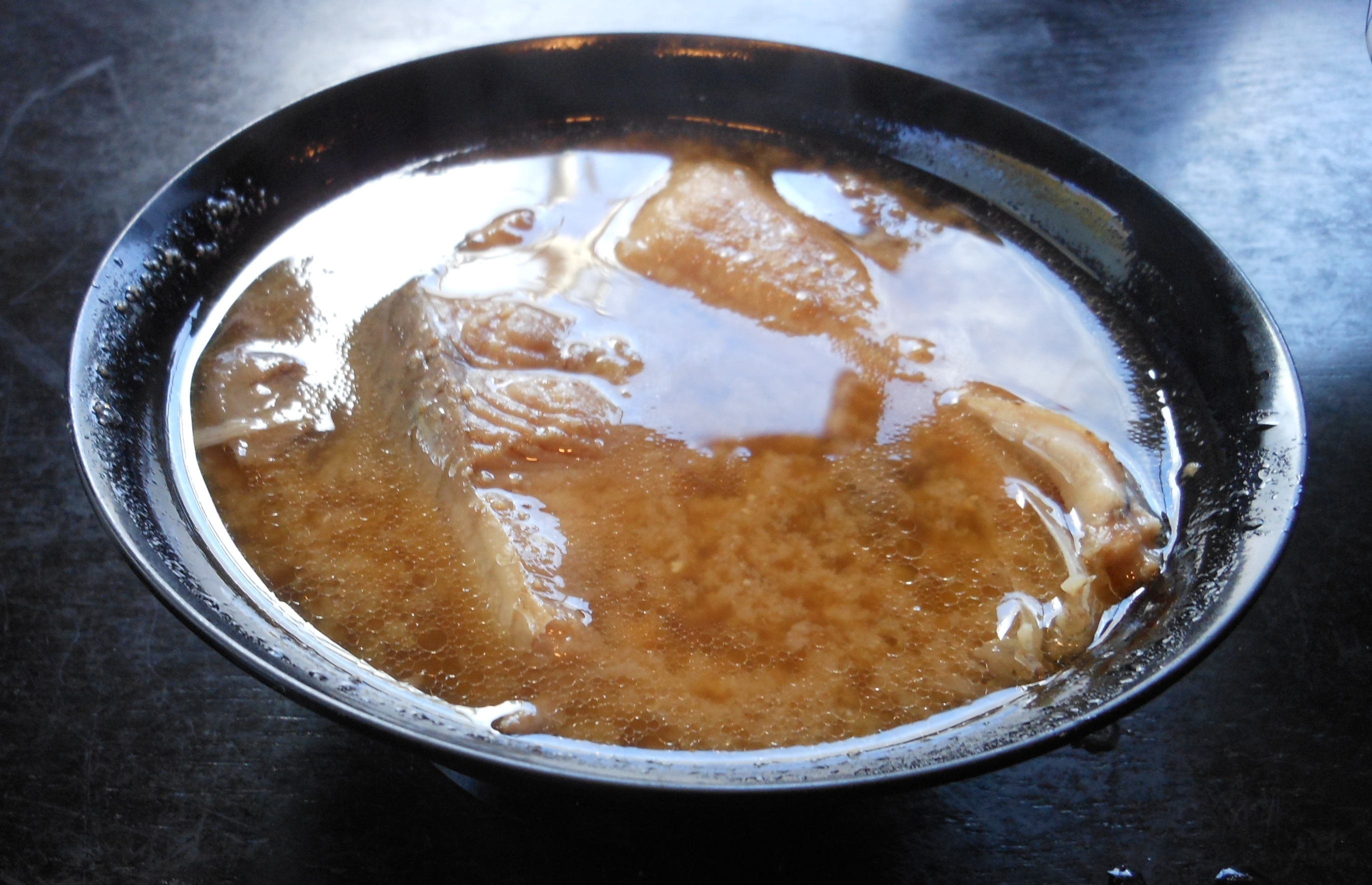
Koikoku (thick miso soup with carp), Japan

== Common carp in culture ==
Common carp
- The original Chinese character for "carp" in seal script (top), Traditional (middle), and Simplified (bottom) characters

Chinese name
- Traditional Chinese: 鯉魚
- Simplified Chinese: 鲤鱼
- Literal meaning: "carp-fish"
Transcriptions
Standard Mandarin
- Hanyu Pinyin: lǐyú
- Wade–Giles: li^{3}-yü^{2}
- IPA: [lì.y̌]
Yue: Cantonese
- Yale Romanization: léih-yùh
- Jyutping: lei^{5}-jyu^{4}
- IPA: [lej˩˧.jy˩]

Japanese name
- Kanji: 鯉
Transcriptions
- Romanization: koi

=== In Chinese literature ===
A long tradition of common carp exists in Chinese culture and literature. One story includes an anecdote which relates to how a man far away from home sent his wife a pair of carp (Chinese: 鲤鱼; pinyin: Liyu), and that when the wife opened the fish to cook them, she found silk strips that said: "Eat well to keep fit" and "missing you and forget me not".

=== The Dragon Gate myth ===
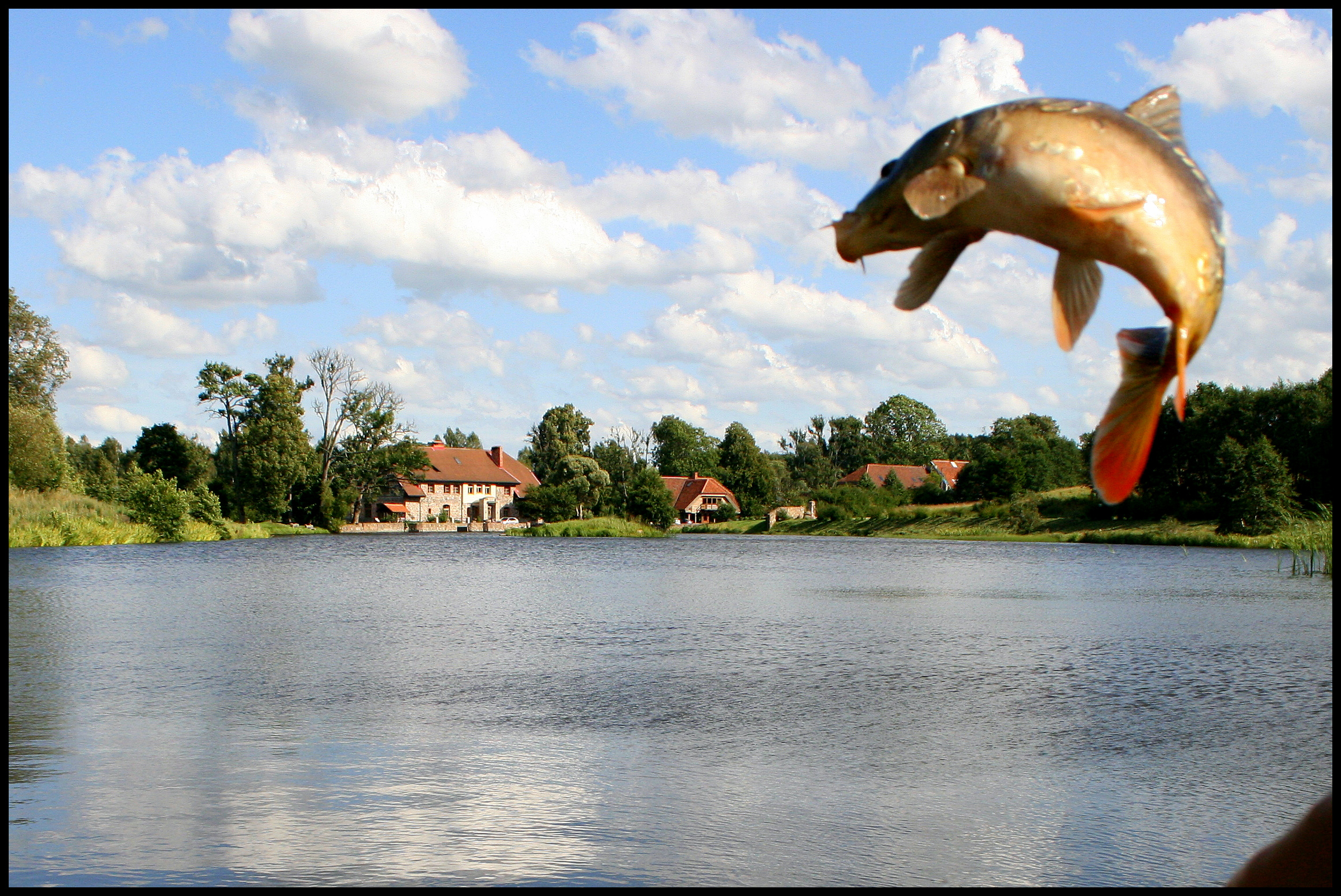
Mirror carp jumping up into the air

In Chinese mythology, the Dragon Gate (simplified Chinese: 龙门; traditional Chinese: 龍門; pinyin: lóngmén; Jyutping: lung4 mun4) is located at the top of a waterfall cascading from a legendary mountain. The legend states that while many carp swim upstream against the river's strong current, few are capable or brave enough for the final leap over the waterfall. If a carp successfully makes the jump, it is transformed into a powerful dragon.

=== In Japanese culture ===
The modern Japanese Koi fish are a brightly colored species of the Amur carp that have been bred by rice farmers in Japan since the early 19th century. This subspecies of carp plays a significant role in Japanese art, often being depicted as symbols of luck, strength, and tenacity. For this reason, Koi fish are also presented as gifts in Japanese culture as symbols of love, gratitude, and peace. Their bright colors and unique patterns present a high degree of eloquence to the Japanese people, thus creating a level of respect and appreciation for the Koi.

With Koi fish being at the forefront of a lot of Japanese art, it is common to find modern depictions of Koi in paintings, home art, murals, and even tattoos.

To many people, Koi fish strongly represent Samurai warriors, as they are able to be seen swimming upwards against a rivers current, symbolizing a Samurai's bravery. One typical saying is the phrase "koi no taki-nobori", translating to "Carp climbing the waterfalls", a phrase that is used to describe a persons strength and perseverance.

== See also ==
- Invasive species
- Oily fish
- Rough fish
