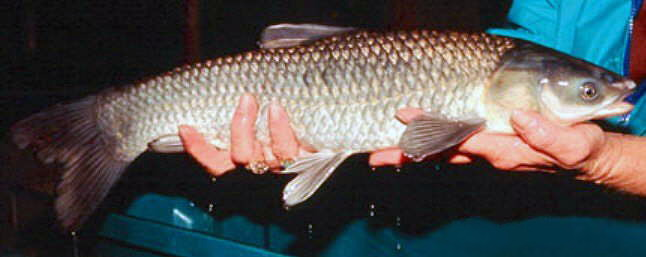

Scientific classification
- Kingdom: Animalia
- Phylum: Chordata
- Class: Actinopterygii
- Order: Cypriniformes
- Family: Xenocyprididae
- Genus: Mylopharyngodon; W. K. H. Peters, 1881

Type species
- Leuciscus aethiops Basilewsky, 1855

Species
- see text

Synonyms
- Leucisculus Oshima, 1920; Myloleuciscus Garman, 1912; Myloleucops Cockerell, 1913; Myloleucus Günther, 1873

= Mylopharyngodon =

Mylopharyngodon Temporal range: Middle Miocene - Recent

Genus of fish

Mylopharyngodon is a genus of freshwater ray-finned fishes belonging to the family Xenocyprididae, the East Asian minnows or sharpbellies. There is one extant and one extinct species in this genus.

== Species ==
Mylopharyngodon has the following species classified within it:

- Mylopharyngodon piceus (J. Richardson, 1846) (Black carp)
- †Mylopharyngodon wui P. Chen & Gloria Arratia, 2010
