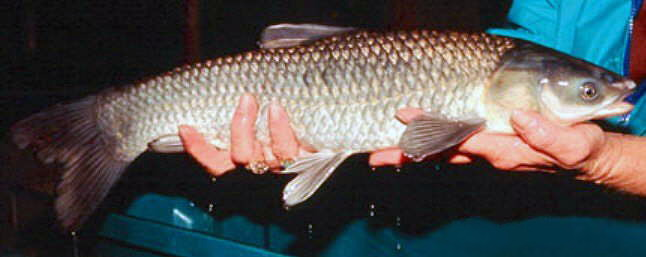
- Adult

Conservation status
- Least Concern (IUCN 3.1)

Scientific classification
- Kingdom: Animalia
- Phylum: Chordata
- Class: Actinopterygii
- Order: Cypriniformes
- Suborder: Cyprinoidei
- Family: Xenocyprididae
- Genus: Mylopharyngodon
- Species: M. piceus

Binomial name
- Mylopharyngodon piceus (J. Richardson, 1846)

Synonyms
- Leuciscus piceus J. Richardson, 1846; Leuciscus aethiops Basilewsky, 1855; Myloleuciscus aethiops (Basilewsky, 1855); Myloleucus aethiops (Basilewsky, 1855); Mylopharyngodon aethiops (Basilewsky, 1855); Leuciscus dubius Bleeker, 1864; Barbus tonkinensis Sauvage, 1884; Myloleuciscus atripinnis Garman, 1912; Leucisculus fuscus Ōshima, 1920

= Black carp =

Species of fish

Global aquaculture production of Black carp (Mylopharyngodon piceus) in thousand tonnes from 1950 to 2022, as reported by the FAO

The black carp or Chinese black roach (Mylopharyngodon piceus) is a species of freshwater ray-finned fish belonging to the family Xenocyprididae, the East Asian minnows or sharpbellies. The black carp is the sole extant species of the genus Mylopharyngodon. It is native to lakes and rivers in East Asia, ranging from the Amur Basin across China to Vietnam. One of the largest xenocypridids in the world, the black carp has a typical length of 60–120 cm (23.5–47 in), though it can reach up to 1.9 m (6 ft 3 in) in length and 35 kg (77 lb) in weight. It is carnivorous and generally feeds on invertebrates such as snails, clams, and mussels.

Black carp, together with bighead carp, silver carp, and grass carp, make up the culturally important "four famous domestic fishes" used in polyculture in China for over 1000 years. It has also been introduced in the United States as one of the invasive "Asian carps", though it is not as widely distributed worldwide as the other three.

In China, black carp is widely cultivated for food and Chinese medicine, being one of the most highly esteemed and expensive domestic food fish, and partly because of its diet and limited food supply, is the most scarce and expensive in the marketplace among the "four famous domestic fishes".

== Description ==
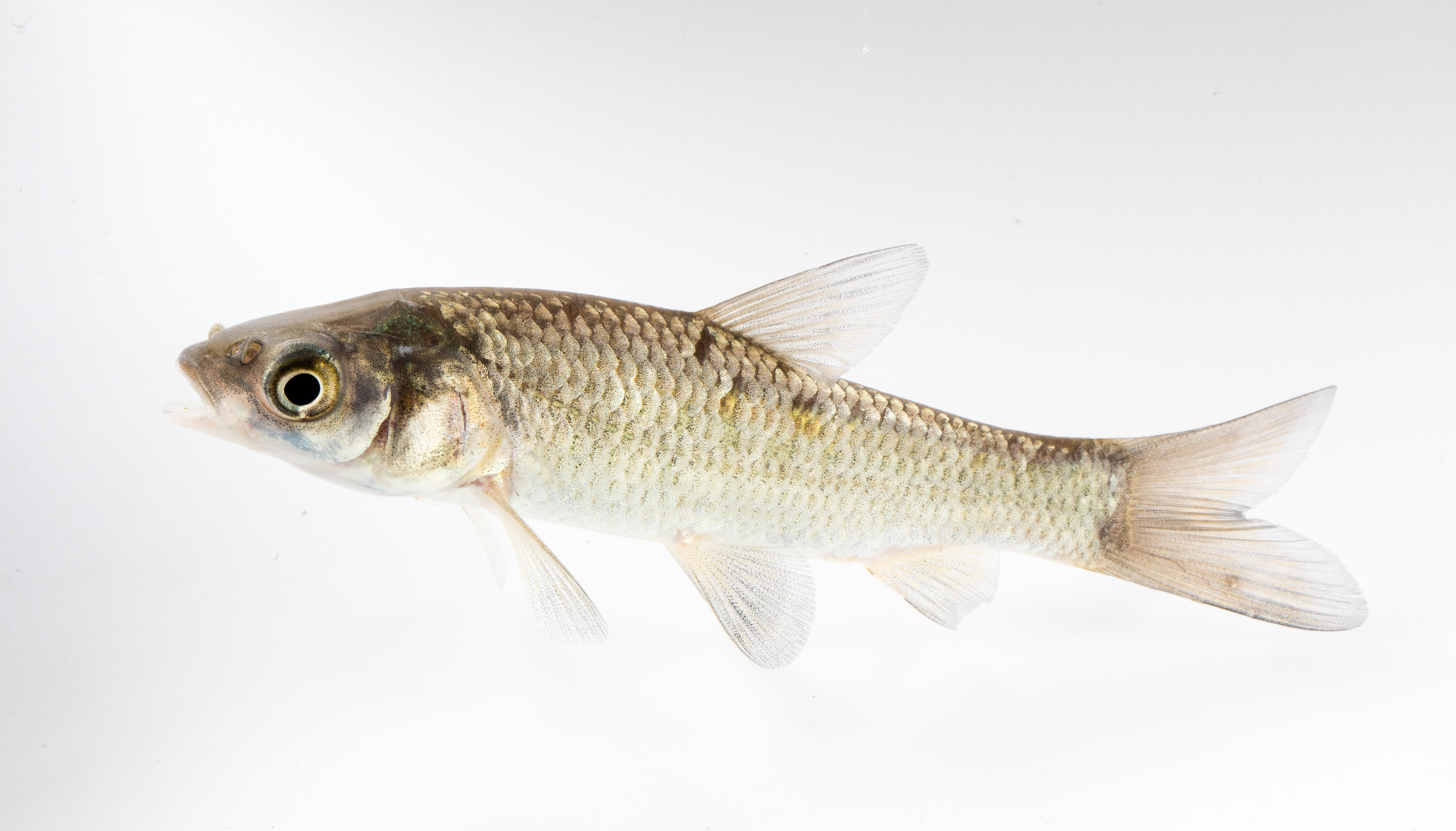
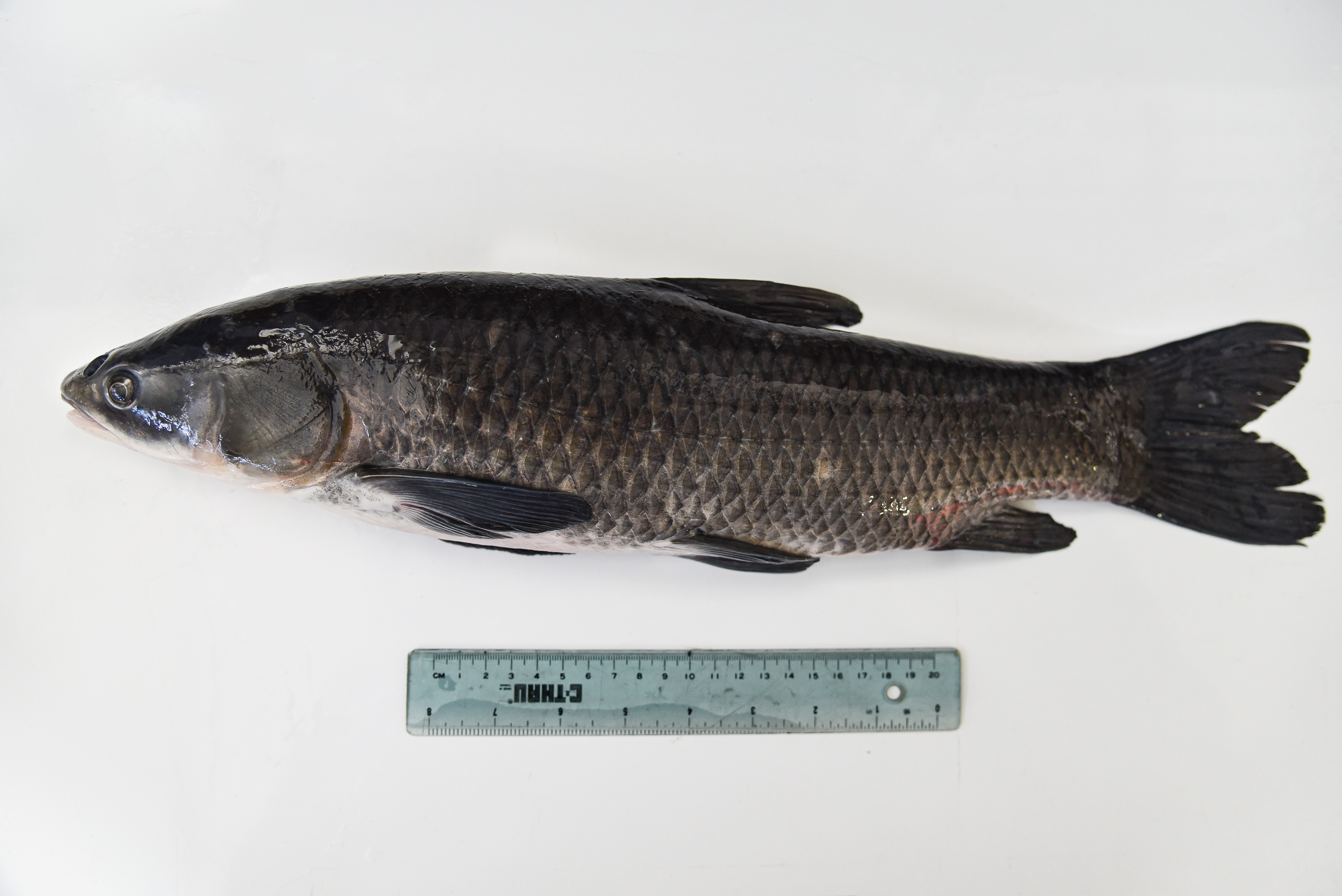
Juvenile black carps at different stages of development

Black carp are elongated fish with a fusiform body. They appear dusky gray, brown, or bluish black and have dark fins. Their dorsal fin is high and pointed. In comparison to grass carp, the distances from the eye to the superior and inferior edges of the preoperculum are respectively longer, contributing to the elongated appearance of the scaleless head. Unlike in grass carp, the upper lip does not appear to protrude beyond the lower lip when viewed from above with the fish's mouth closed. The black carp has large cycloid scales on its body and a forked tail fin behind a broad caudal peduncle. This fish has 24 chromosomes with a genome size of 848.70 Mbp.

== Black carp in the United States ==
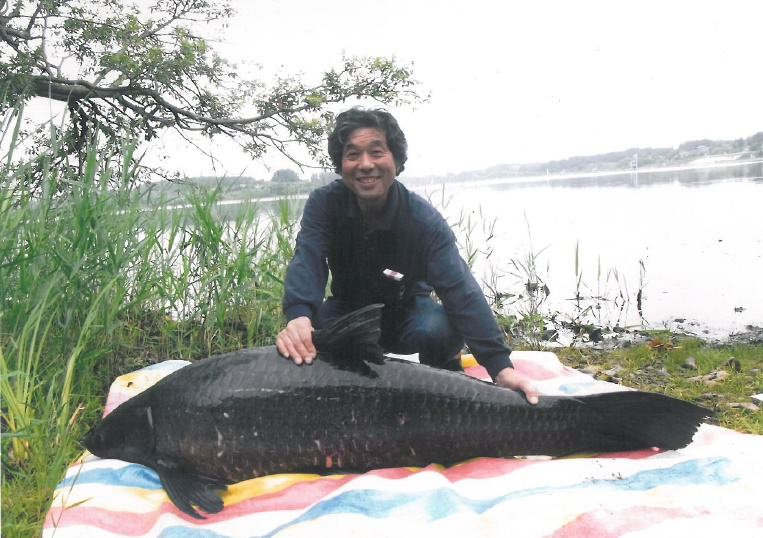
Caught in Tome, Japan

The black carp was first accidentally introduced into the United States during a grass carp shipment from Asia in the 1970s. It was later intentionally introduced to the US in the 1980s for use in retention ponds and aquaculture facilities to manage yellow grub and aquatic snail populations. It was also to be used as food fish, but flooding in the South caused these populations of carp to spread into the Mississippi watershed. They continued to spread via the Mississippi and Missouri Rivers, where they began to form wild populations. Black carp later began to migrate to connected river systems and spread by continued flooding events.

The nature of the black carp's diet has led to its use in the United States in the control of snails in aquaculture. Snails are obligate alternate hosts of trematode pests that can cause substantial losses to aquaculture crops. Some state aquaculture laws require the carp to be bred as triploids, to render them sterile, thus minimizing the potential for the fish to escape and create self-sustaining populations. The use of triploids, though, does require the maintenance and use of fertile diploid brood stock at least at some location for production of the triploids.

Many mechanical control methods have been used to control the population of Asian carp, including use of noise, walls of bubbles, netting, and even explosions, but these have only succeeded in slowing the spread of carp. The most effective methods, such as chemical poisoning, are successful at killing carp, but also affect other fish in the body of water, further disrupting the ecosystem.

Currently, novel control methods are being researched that use carp pheromones to control their behavior. Another widespread effort involves using carp as a food source. Locals in areas where carp have invaded are encouraged to catch and eat them. Efforts to prevent Asian carp from spreading to crucial ecosystems such as the Great Lakes or waterways on the West Coast are ongoing. Local laws prevent human release of these fish in these waterways, and population controls have also contributed to this success. No state allows the intentional release of black carp, sterile or otherwise, but the United States Geological Survey reports that more than 60 confirmed black carp have been caught in the Mississippi River basin. This basin is the second-largest drainage system on the North American continent. The Mississippi River spans 2320 miles, while the entire system covers 1,151,000 sq mi. The presence of black carp within this enormous river system means that this highly invasive species has access to a vast range of bodies of water covering the majority of the Midwestern United States. Rivers where black carp have been captured also include the White in Arkansas, the Atchafalaya and Red in Louisiana, and the Kaskaskia and Illinois Rivers in Illinois. One confirmed escape of black carp from aquaculture has occurred on the Osage River in Missouri, but other escapes are likely, because most early captures were far from this location, in the southern Mississippi basin. Most of the captured fish have been confirmed to be diploid and assumed fertile. Two diploid fingerlings were captured near Cape Girardeau, Missouri, in 2016, a sign of natural reproduction of this species in the wild. In Louisiana, many other reports by knowledgeable fishers of their capture have not been verified by biologists.

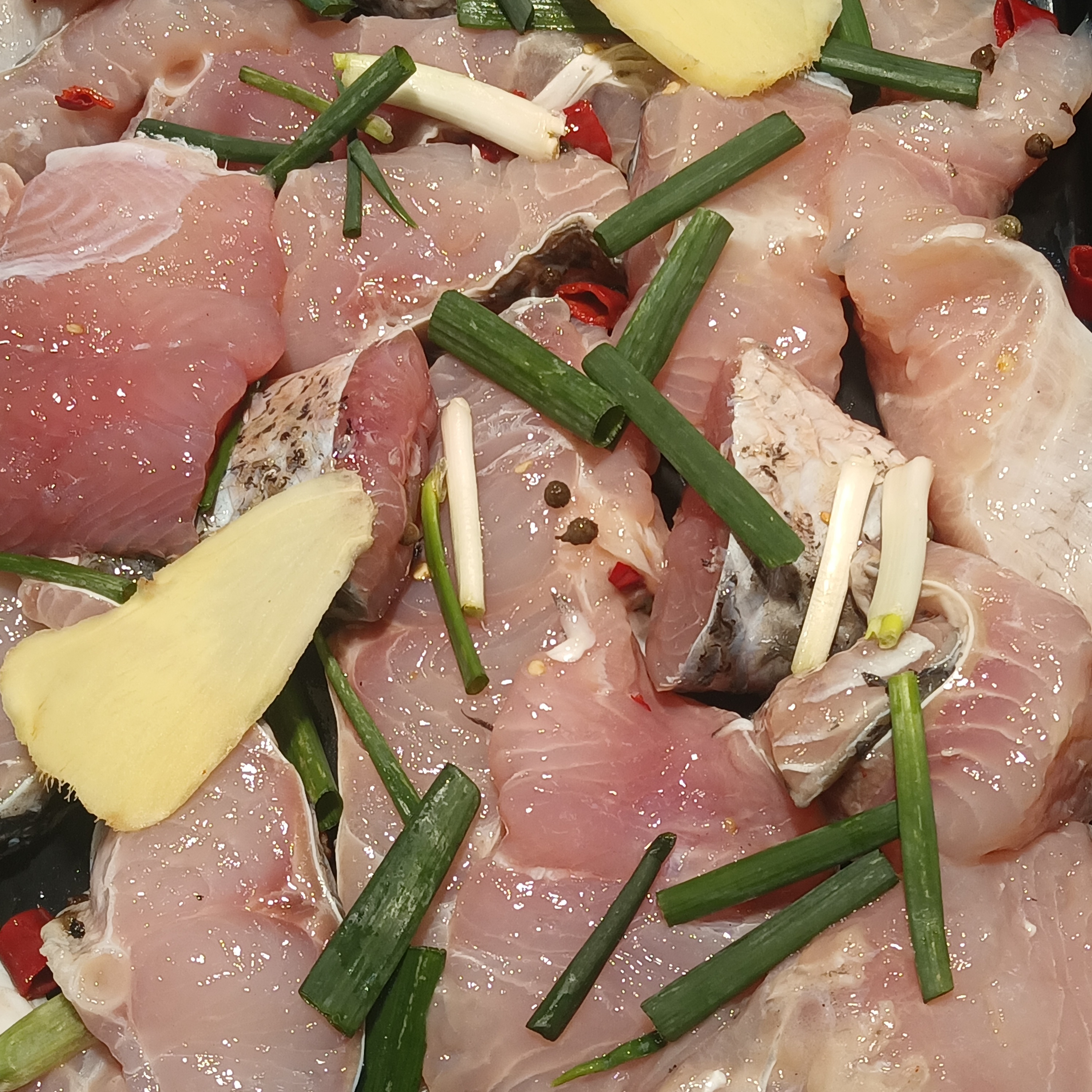
Filets

Black carp are considered to be a serious threat to mollusks native to the United States, many of which are critically endangered. In 2007, the black carp was listed as an "injurious species" under the Lacey Act of 1900. Transporting live black carp, whether sterile or fertile, into the United States or across state lines is thus illegal in most cases.

== Anatomy and physiology ==
Black carp have enameloid teeth located in the posterior pharynx between the cleithral bones. There are four teeth on the left side and five teeth on the right side of the pharynx in adults. As the black carp prepare to crush shelled prey, they forcibly occlude their pharyngeal teeth. A horny patch above the pharyngeal teeth helps to position and hold the prey in place as it is crushed. The pharyngeal teeth will be replaced multiple times during the life of the carp.

== Etymology ==
Generic name from Greek mylo- "mill" + New Latin pharynx- "throat" + Greek odon "tooth". Specific name from Latin piceus "pitch black."
