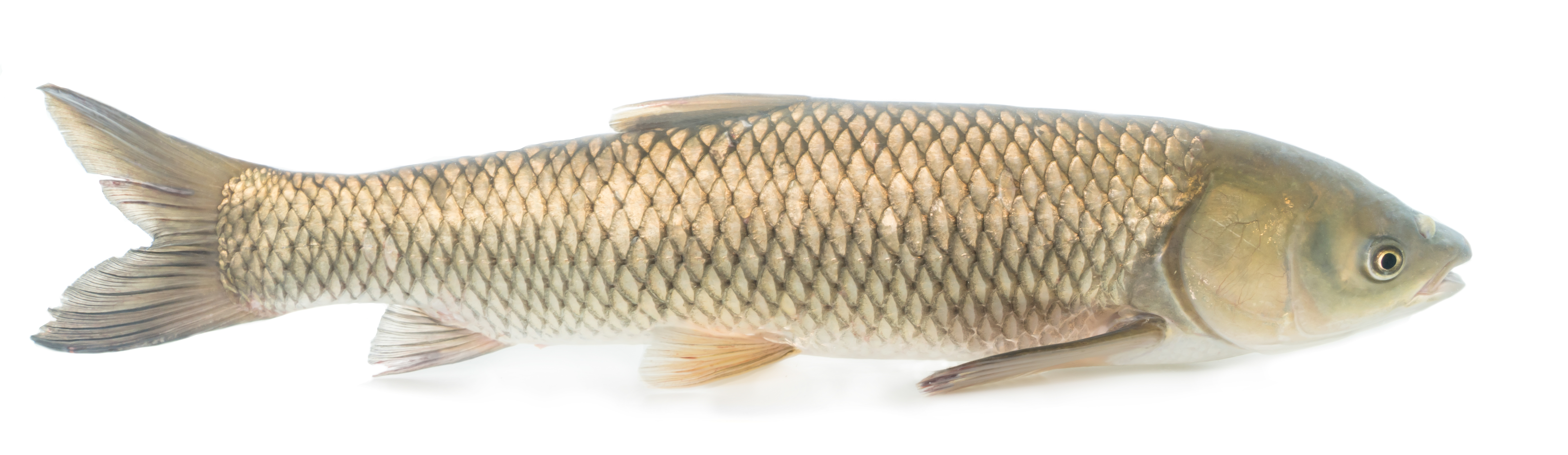

Conservation status
- Least Concern (IUCN 3.1)

Scientific classification
- Kingdom: Animalia
- Phylum: Chordata
- Class: Actinopterygii
- Division: Teleostei
- Order: Cypriniformes
- Family: Xenocyprididae
- Genus: Ctenopharyngodon; Steindachner, 1866
- Species: C. idella

Binomial name
- Ctenopharyngodon idella (Valenciennes in Cuvier & Valenciennes, 1844)

Synonyms
- List: Leuciscus idella Valenciennes, 1844; Ctenopharingodon idellus (Valenciennes, 1844); Ctenopharyngodon idellus (Valenciennes, 1844); Leuciscus tschiliensis Basilewsky, 1855; Ctenopharyngodon laticeps Steindachner, 1866; Sarcocheilichthys teretiusculus Kner, 1867; Pristiodon siemionovii Dybowski, 1877

= Grass carp =

Grass carp Temporal range: Early Miocene–present

Species of fish

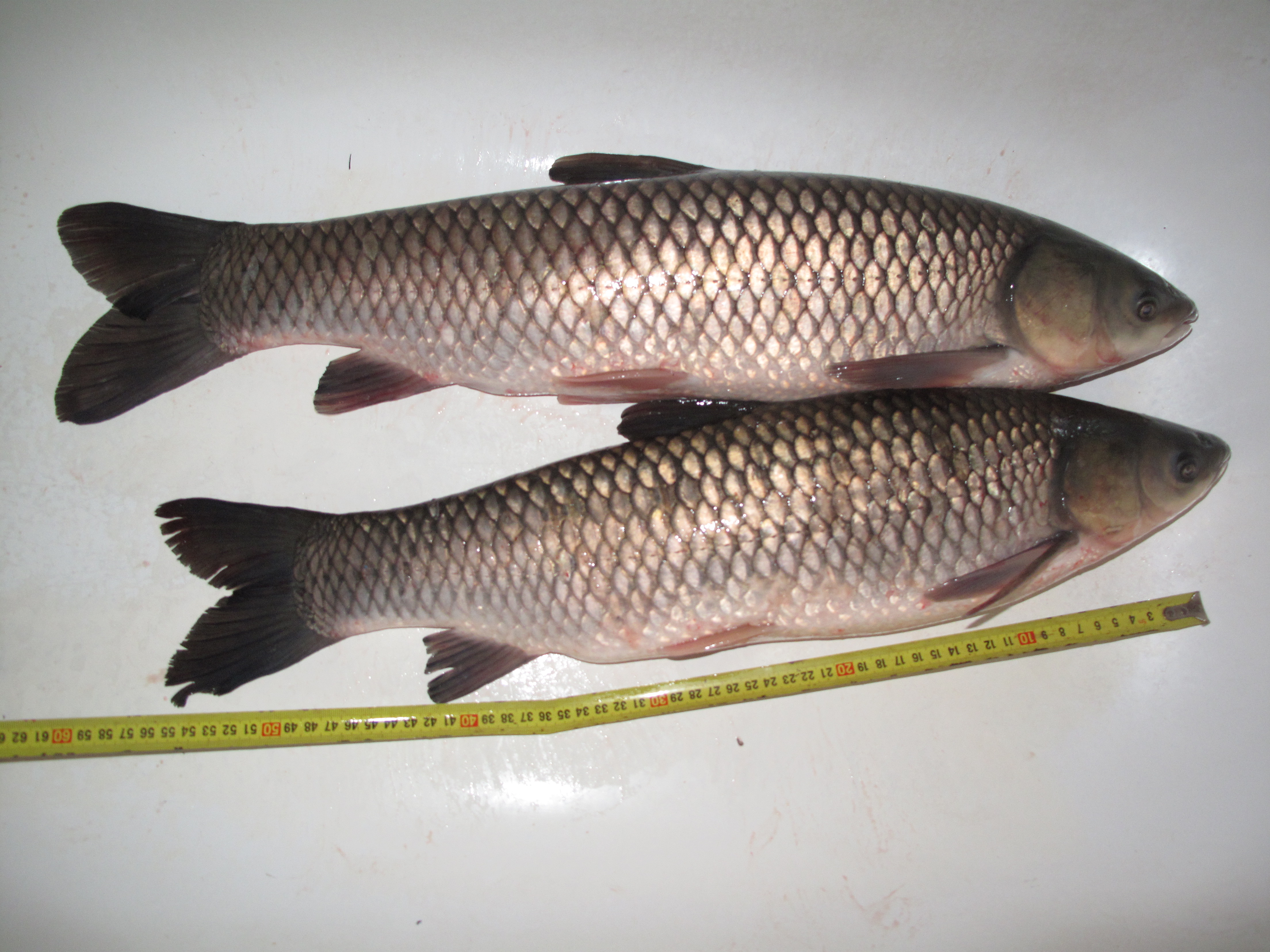
Adult grass carp

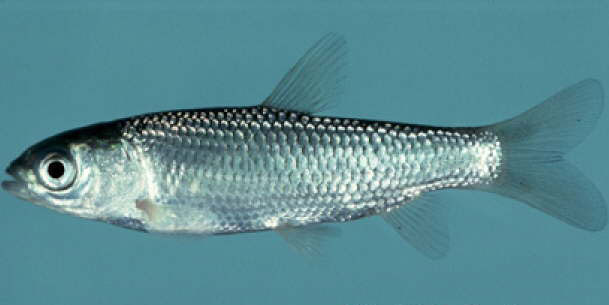
Juvenile grass carp

The grass carp (Ctenopharyngodon idella) is a species of large herbivorous freshwater fish in the family Cyprinidae, native to the Pacific Far East, with a native range stretching from northern Vietnam to the Amur River on the Sino-Russian border. This Asian carp is the only species of the genus Ctenopharyngodon.

Grass carp are resident fish of large turbid rivers and associated floodplain lakes/wetlands with a wide range of temperature tolerance, and spawn at temperatures of 20 to 30 °C (68 to 86 °F). It has been cultivated as a food fish in China for centuries, being known as one of the "Four Great Domestic Fish" (Chinese: 四大家鱼), but was later introduced to Europe and the United States for aquatic weed control, becoming the fish species with the largest reported farmed production globally, over five million tonnes per year.

== Evolution ==
The grass carp is the only extant member of the genus Ctenopharyngodon, but two other extinct species in the genus are known from Early Miocene-aged fossil teeth from China: †Ctenopharyngodon orientalis Su, Chang & Chen, 2021 (Xiacaowan Formation of Hebei) and †Ctenopharyngodon xiejiaensis Su, Chang & Chen, 2021 (Xiejia Formation of Qinghai). The extinct species †Ctenopharyngodon hermi Rückert-Ülkümen, 1994 is known from a complete skeleton from the mid-late Miocene-aged Congeria Limestone of Edirne, Turkey. The earliest fossil teeth of the modern grass carp (C. idella) appear in the Early Pliocene-aged Gaozhuang Formation of Shanxi. Two other extinct genera that appear to be related to grass carp, †Eoctenopharyngodon and †Dezaoia, are known from the Oligocene of China.

== Description ==
Grass carp have elongated, chubby, torpedo-shaped body forms. The terminal mouth is slightly oblique with non-fleshy, firm lips, and no barbels. The complete lateral line contains 40 to 42 scales. Broad, ridged pharyngeal teeth are arranged in a "2, 4-4, 2" formula. The dorsal fin has eight to 10 soft rays, and the anal fin is set closer to the tail than most cyprinids. The body color is dark olive, shading to brownish-yellow on the sides, with a white belly and large, slightly outlined scales.

Grass carp grow very rapidly. Young fish stocked in the spring at 20 cm (7.9 in) will reach over 45 cm (18 in) by fall. The typical length is about 60–100 cm (23.5–39.5 in). The maximum length is 2.0 m (6.6 ft) and they grow to 45 kg (99 lb).

== Ecology ==
Grass carp inhabit lakes, ponds, pools and backwaters of large rivers, preferring large, slow-flowing or standing water bodies with abundant vegetation. In the wild, grass carp spawn in fast-moving rivers, and their eggs, which are slightly heavier than water, develop while drifting downstream, kept in suspension by turbulence. Grass carp require long rivers for the survival of the eggs and very young fish, and the eggs are thought to die if they sink to the bottom.

Adult grass carps feed primarily on aquatic plants, both higher aquatic plants and submerged terrestrial vegetation, but may also eat detritus, insects and other invertebrates. They eat up to three times their own body weight daily, and thrive in small lakes and backwaters that provide an abundant supply of vegetation.

According to one study, grass carp live 5–9 years, with the oldest surviving 11 years. In Silver Lake, Washington, a thriving population of grass carp is passing the 15-year mark.

== Introduced species ==
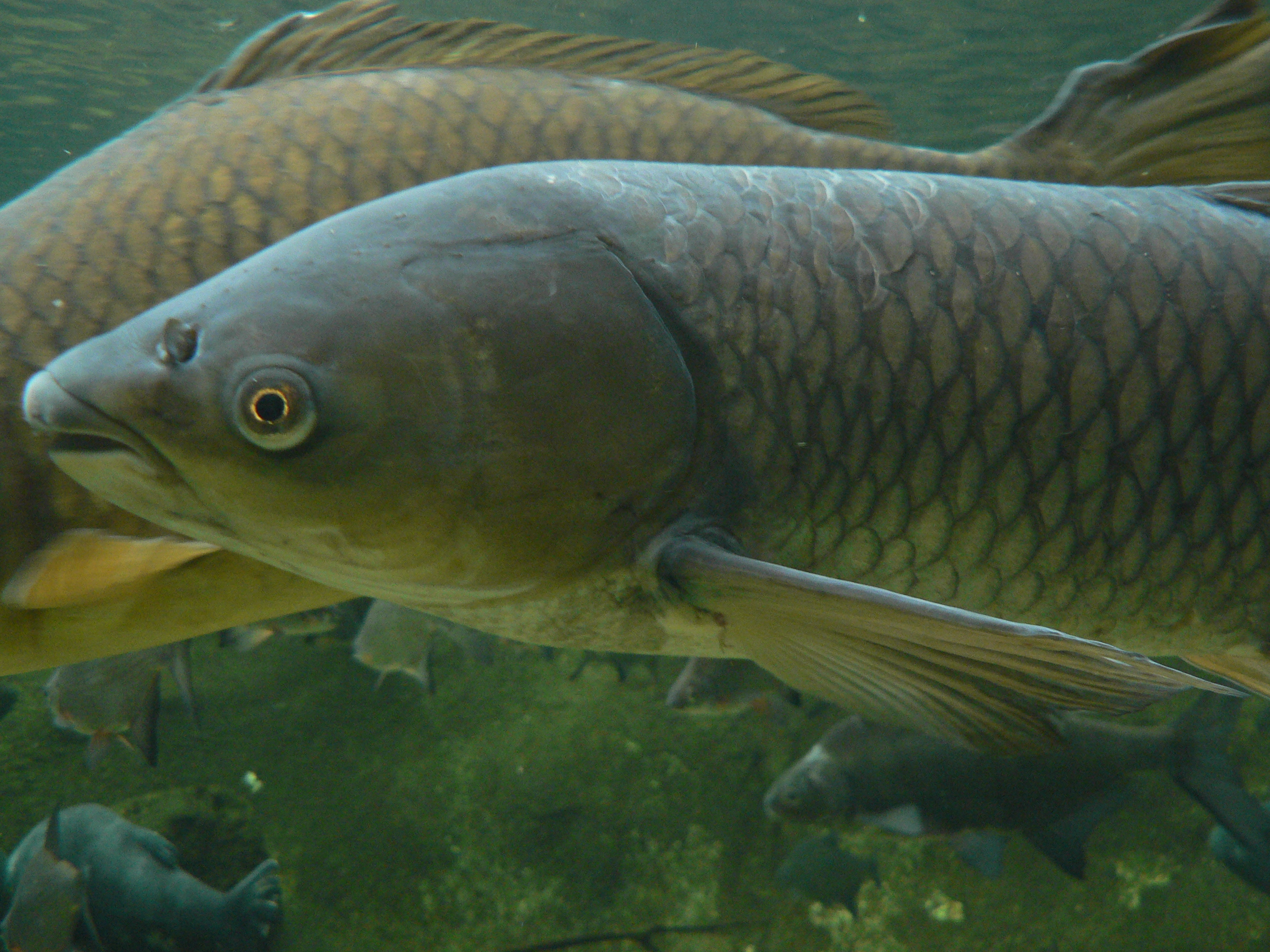
Closeup, in captivity

Grass carp have been introduced to many countries around the world. In the Northern Hemisphere, countries and territories of introduction include Japan, the Philippines, Malaysia, India, Pakistan, Iran, Israel, the United States, Mexico, Sweden, Denmark, the United Kingdom, France, Germany, the Netherlands, Switzerland, Italy, Poland, Hungary, the Czech Republic, Slovakia, Romania, Croatia, Slovenia, Serbia, Montenegro, Bosnia and Herzegovina and Macedonia. In the Southern Hemisphere, they have been introduced to Argentina, Venezuela, Australia, New Zealand, Fiji and South Africa. Grass carp are known to have spawned and established self-reproducing populations in only six of the many larger Northern Hemisphere rivers into which they have been stocked. Their failure to establish populations in other rivers suggests they have quite specific reproductive requirements.

In the United States, the species was first imported in 1963 from Taiwan and Malaysia to aquaculture facilities in Alabama and Arkansas. The first release is believed to have been an accidental escape in 1966 from the U.S. Fish and Wildlife Service's Fish Farming Experimental Station in Stuttgart, Arkansas, followed by planned introductions beginning in 1969. Subsequently, authorized, illegal and accidental introductions have been widespread; by the 1970s, the species had been introduced to 40 states, and it has since been reported in 45 of the country's 50 states. In 2013, it was determined to be reproducing in the Great Lakes Basin. Triploid grass carp (unable to reproduce) are still stocked as in many states as an effective biocontrol for undesirable aquatic vegetation, many species of which are themselves introduced.

== Use ==
=== Weed control ===
Grass carp were introduced into New Zealand in 1966 to control the growth of aquatic plants. Unlike the other introduced fish brought to New Zealand, the potential value and impact of grass carp was investigated in secure facilities prior to their use in field trials. They are now approved by the New Zealand government for aquatic weed control, although each instance requires specific authorization. In the Netherlands, the species was also introduced in 1973 to control over-abundant aquatic weeds. The release was controlled and regulated by the Dutch Ministry of Agriculture, Nature, and Food Quality. In both of these countries, control is made easier because grass carp are very unlikely to naturally reproduce because of their very specific breeding requirements, but elsewhere, control is obtained by the use of sterile, triploid fish.

=== Food ===
Global aquaculture production of grass carp (Ctenopharyngodon idella) in million tonnes from 1950 to 2022, as reported by the FAO

Grass carp is one of the most common freshwater farmed fish in China, being one of the Four Domestic Fish (四大家鱼) alongside the black carp, silver carp, and bighead carp. Its meat is tender, with little bones. Many Chinese cuisine has grass carp as a featured dish, such as Cantonese cuisine. In some Asian countries, it is believed that ingestion of raw bile or entire gall bladders of the grass carp may improve visual acuity and health. However, it may in fact cause severe poisoning.

=== Fishing ===
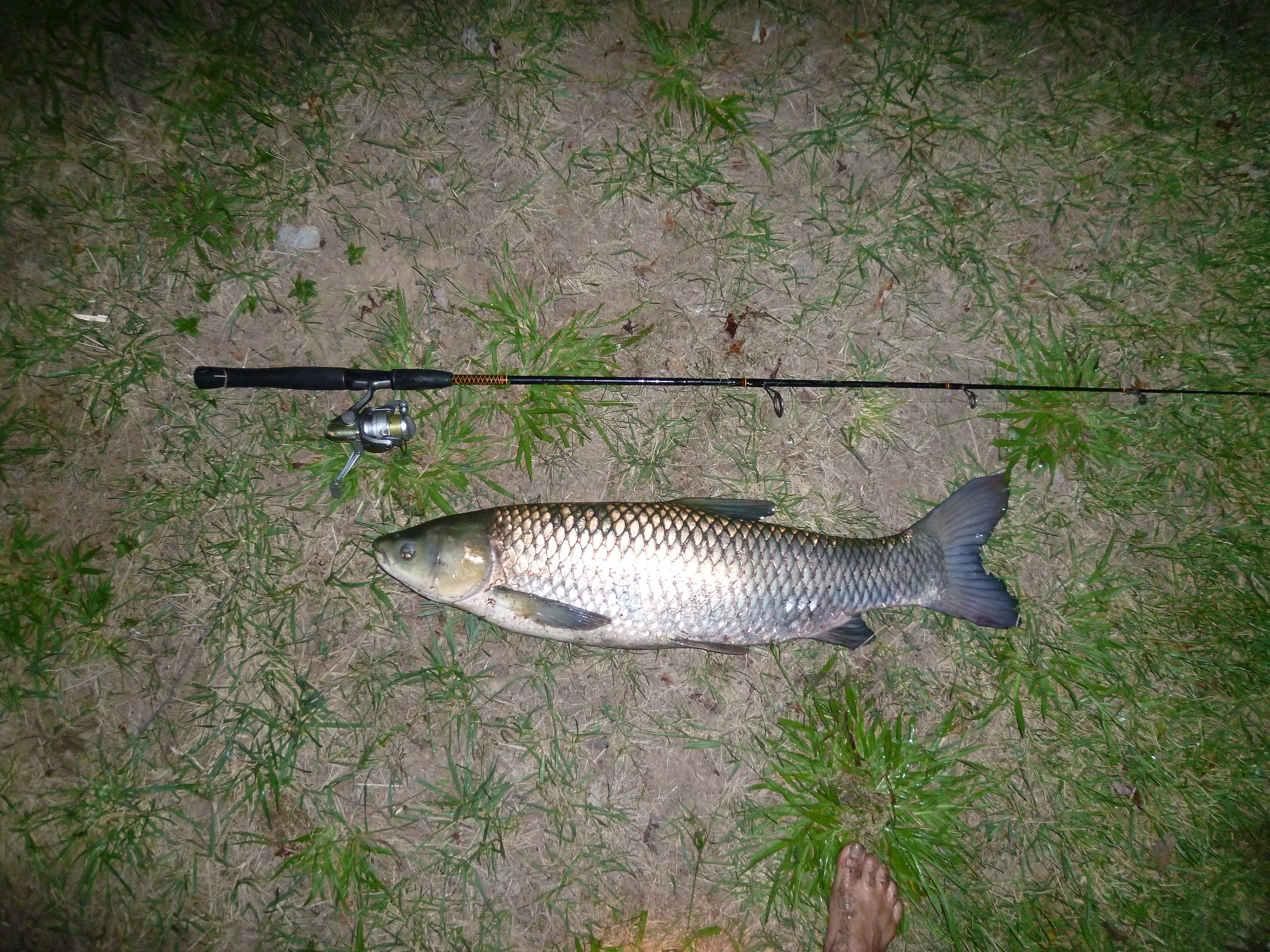
Caught on monofilament fishing line

Grass carp grow large and are strong fighters when hooked on a line, but because of their vegetarian habits and their wariness, they can be difficult to catch via angling. The IGFA World record for a grass carp caught on line and hook is 39.75 kg (87.6 lb), caught in Bulgaria in 2009. The fish are also popular sport fish in areas where bowfishing is legal.

Where grass carp populations are maintained through stocking as a biocontrol for noxious weeds, fishermen are typically asked to return any caught to the water alive and unharmed.

=== Breeding ===
Grass carp have long maturation periods of 5 years that limit breeding efficiency. Researchers from the Institute of Hydrobiology, Chinese Academy of Sciences, developed a ultra-fast breeding strategy by transplanting the female germline stem cells from grass carp into sterile zebrafish. The host zebrafish produced all-X sperm and all-female grass carp within just three months, dramatically shortening the breeding cycle .
