= Spanning =

Spanning may refer to:

- Disc spanning, a feature of CD and DVD burning software
- File spanning, the ability to package a single file or data stream into separate files of a specified size
- Linear spanning, a concept in abstract algebra
- Spanning tree, a subgraph which is a tree, containing all the vertices of a graph
- Søren Spanning (1951–2020), Danish actor

== See also ==
- Span (disambiguation)
- Spanner (disambiguation)
