= Largescale silver carp =

Conservation status
- Data Deficient (IUCN 3.1)

Scientific classification
- Kingdom: Animalia
- Phylum: Chordata
- Class: Actinopterygii
- Order: Cypriniformes
- Suborder: Cyprinoidei
- Family: Xenocyprididae
- Genus: Hypophthalmichthys
- Species: H. harmandi

Binomial name
- Hypophthalmichthys harmandi Sauvage, 1884

Synonyms
- Hypophthalmichthys molitrix harmandi Mai, 1978

Species of fish

The largescale silver carp (Hypophthalmichthys harmandi) is a freshwater fish in the carp family Cyprinidae. It is native to Hainan and Vietnam.

The largescale silver carp is closely related to the silver carp, but its native range is to the south of that of the silver carp, mostly within Vietnam. Unlike bighead and silver carp, largescale silver carp have not been widely introduced around the world for use in aquaculture, although at least one introduction was made to some waters of the Soviet Union, where they hybridized with the introduced silver carp.

== Etymology ==
The fish is named in honor of François-Jules Harmand, a French Navy Surgeon, naturalist and explorer of Indochina, who was the one who collected holotype.
