= Asian carp =

Common name for several species of fish

Asian carp is a term that groups together several species of carp native to Eurasia, commonly referring to the four East Asian species silver carp, bighead carp, grass carp (or white amur) and black carp (or black amur), (Note: The definition of Asian carp can be found including common carp as well, as in Koel et al. (2000).) which were introduced to North America during the 1970s and are now regarded as invasive in the United States.

The four species, now also known commercially as Copi in the United States, are staple food fish in their native China, where they are collectively known as qing cao lian yong (青草鲢鳙) or "Four Great Domestic Fish" (四大家鱼) (Note: In Guangdong, 四大家鱼 means silver, bighead carp, white amur and mud carp (commonly known as dace).) and are farmed extensively.

== Asian carp and related fish ==
- Hypophthalmichthys molitrix – silver carp, silverfin, lian
- H. nobilis – bighead carp, yong
- Ctenopharyngodon idella – grass carp, white amur, cao
- Mylopharyngodon piceus – black carp, black amur, qing
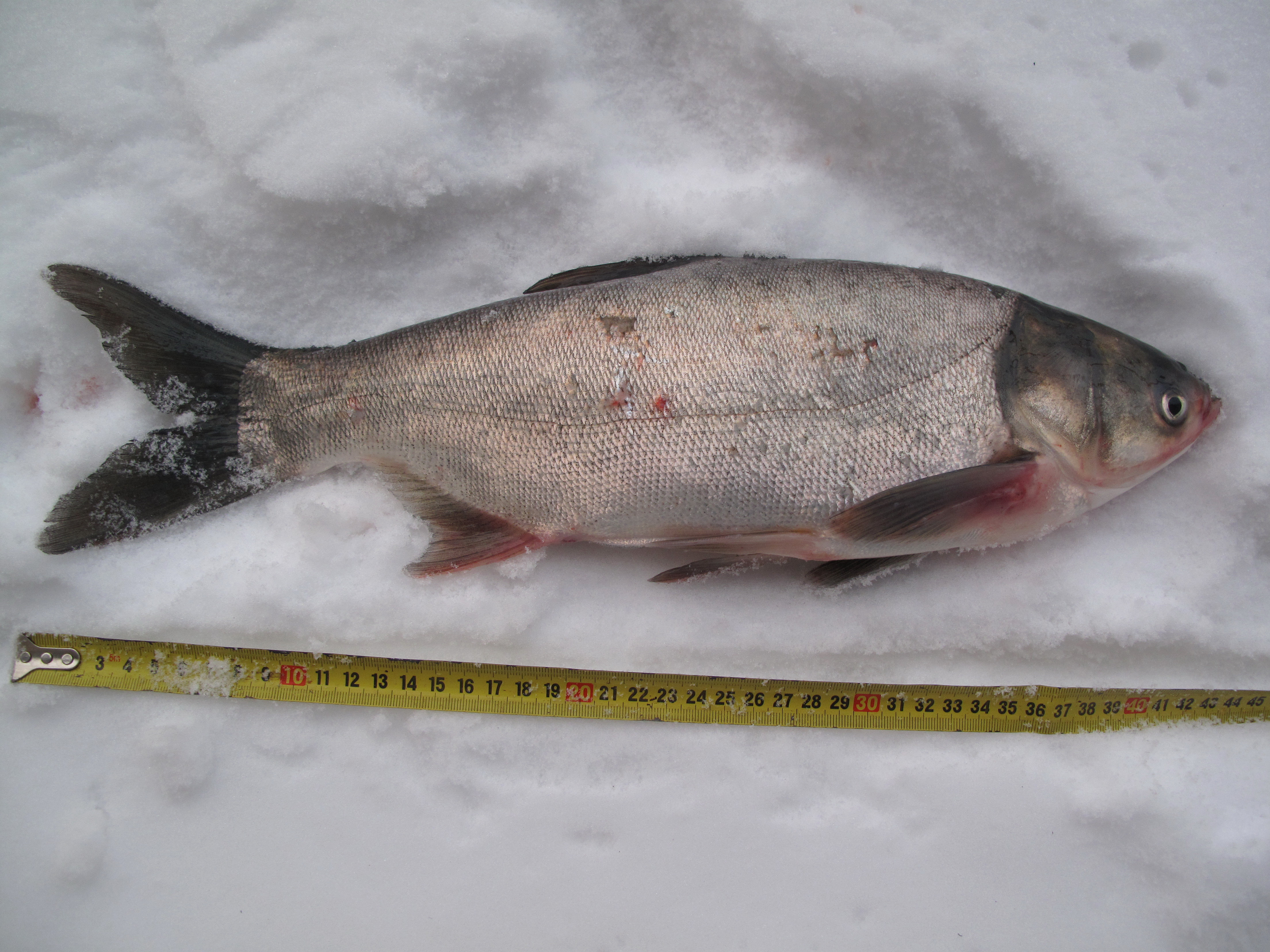
Silver carp

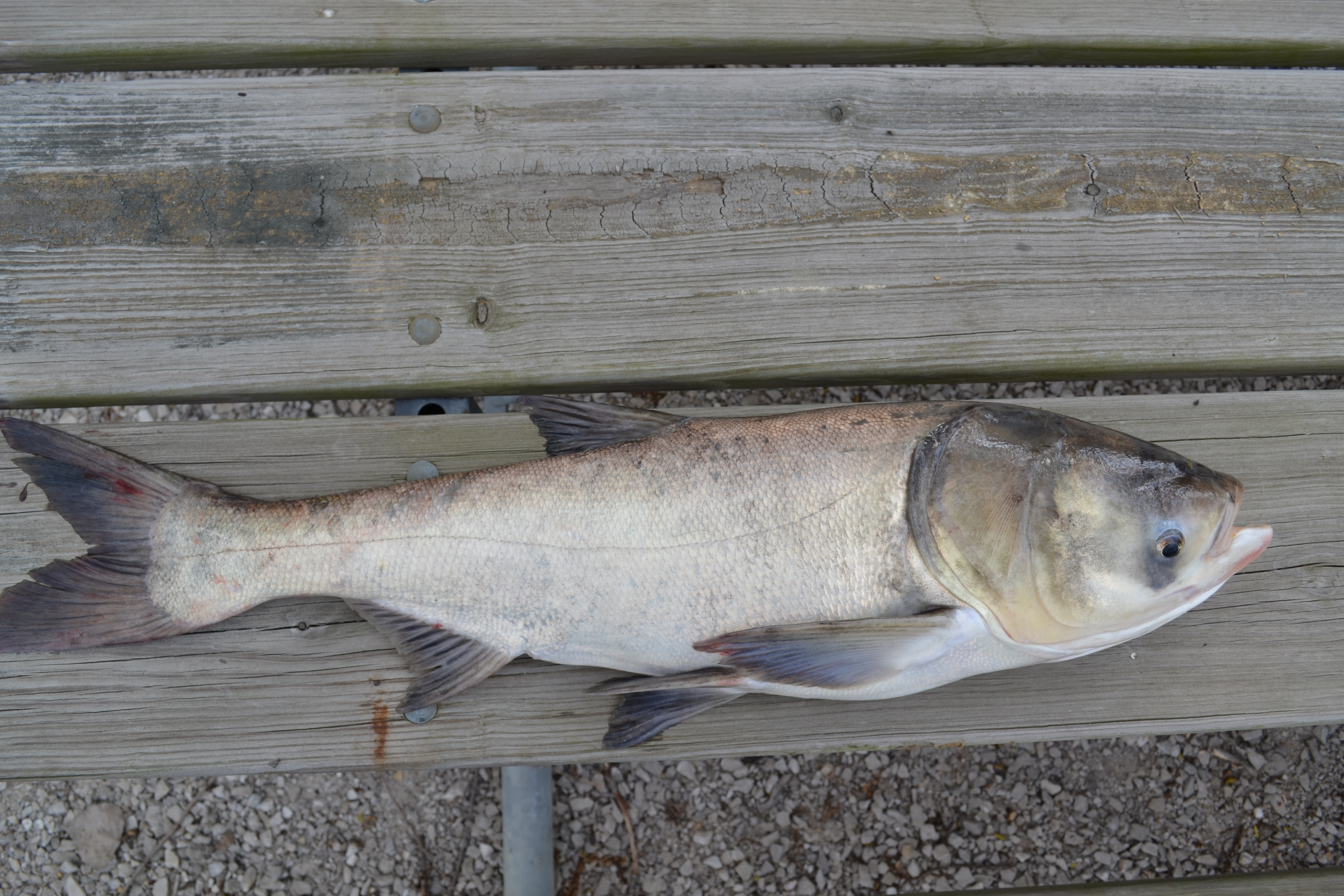
Bighead carp

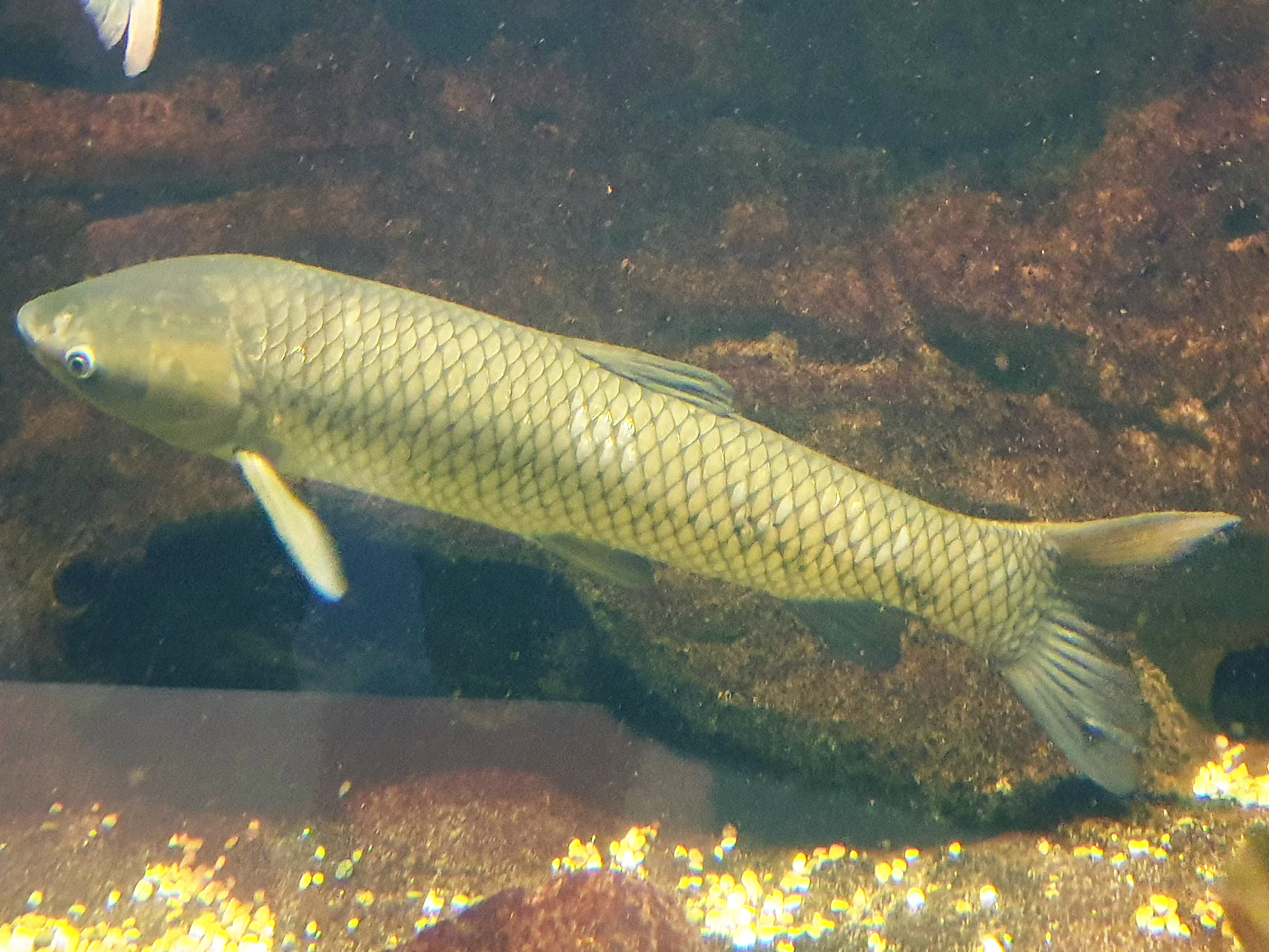
White amur

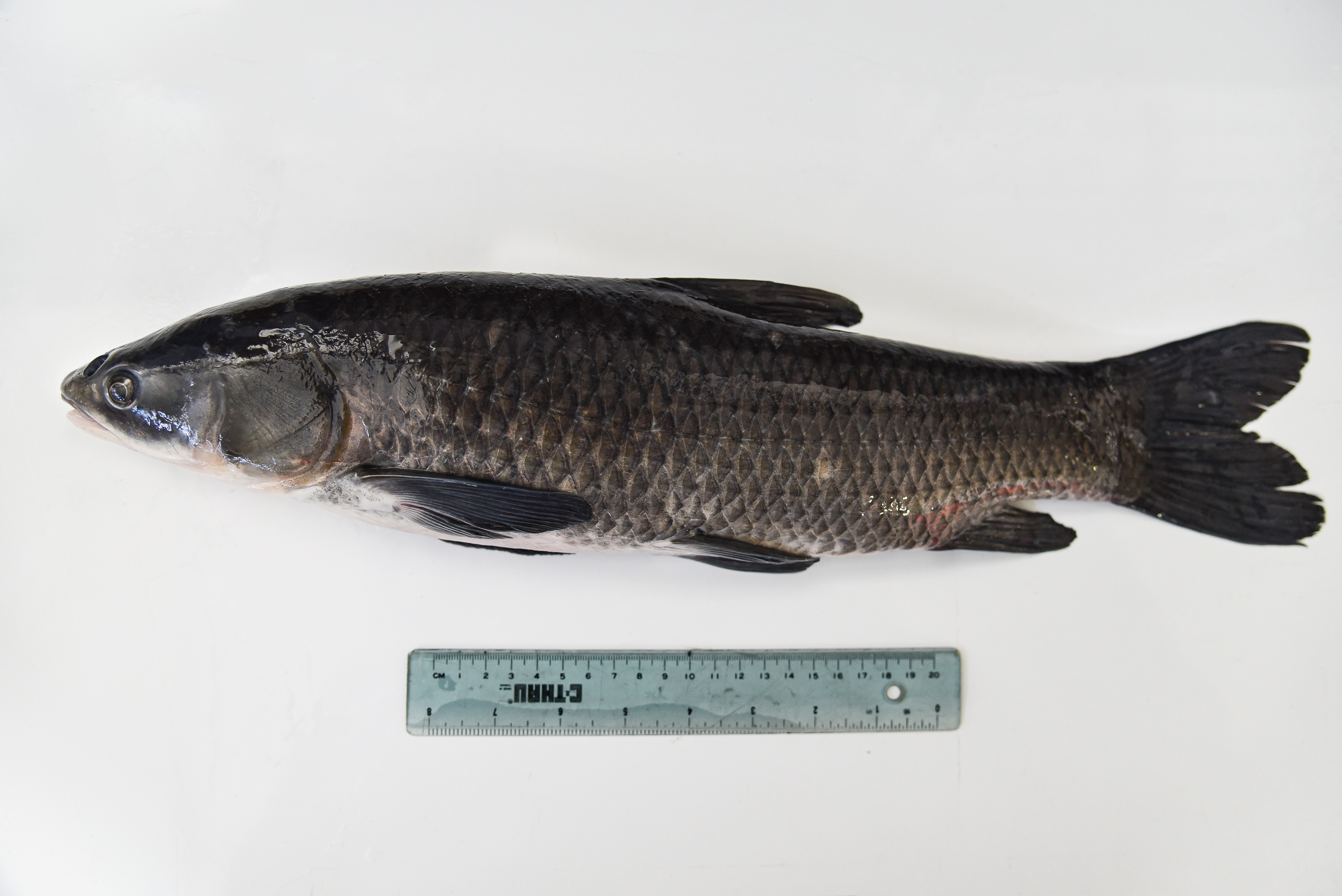
Black amur

=== Other Cyprinoidei fish farmed in China ===
Common carp, amur carp, and crucian carp are also common food fishes in China and elsewhere. Goldfish, though, are cultivated mainly as pet fish.

- Cyprinus carpio – common carp
- C. rubrofuscus – Amur carp
- Carassius auratus – goldfish
- C. carasius – crucian carp, crucian
- Cirrhinus molitorella – dace, mud carp
- Megalobrama amblycephala – blunt snout bream, Wuchang bream

== Characteristics ==
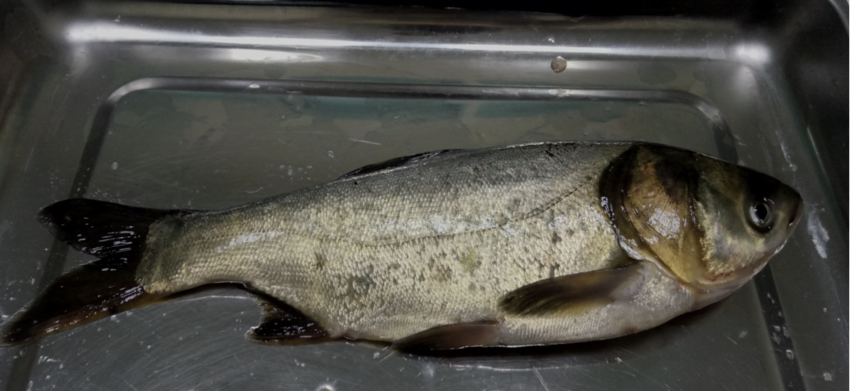
A bighead-silver carp hybrid

These four fish have been cultivated in aquaculture in China for over 1,000 years.

Bighead and silver carp are the most important fish worldwide in terms of total aquaculture production.

Asian carp are big fish, with black amur adults growing as big as 33 lbs (15 kg) on average, with the biggest one weighing 150 lbs (70 kg).

Bighead and silver carp can crossbreed and produce hybrid offspring.

=== Jumping of silver carp ===
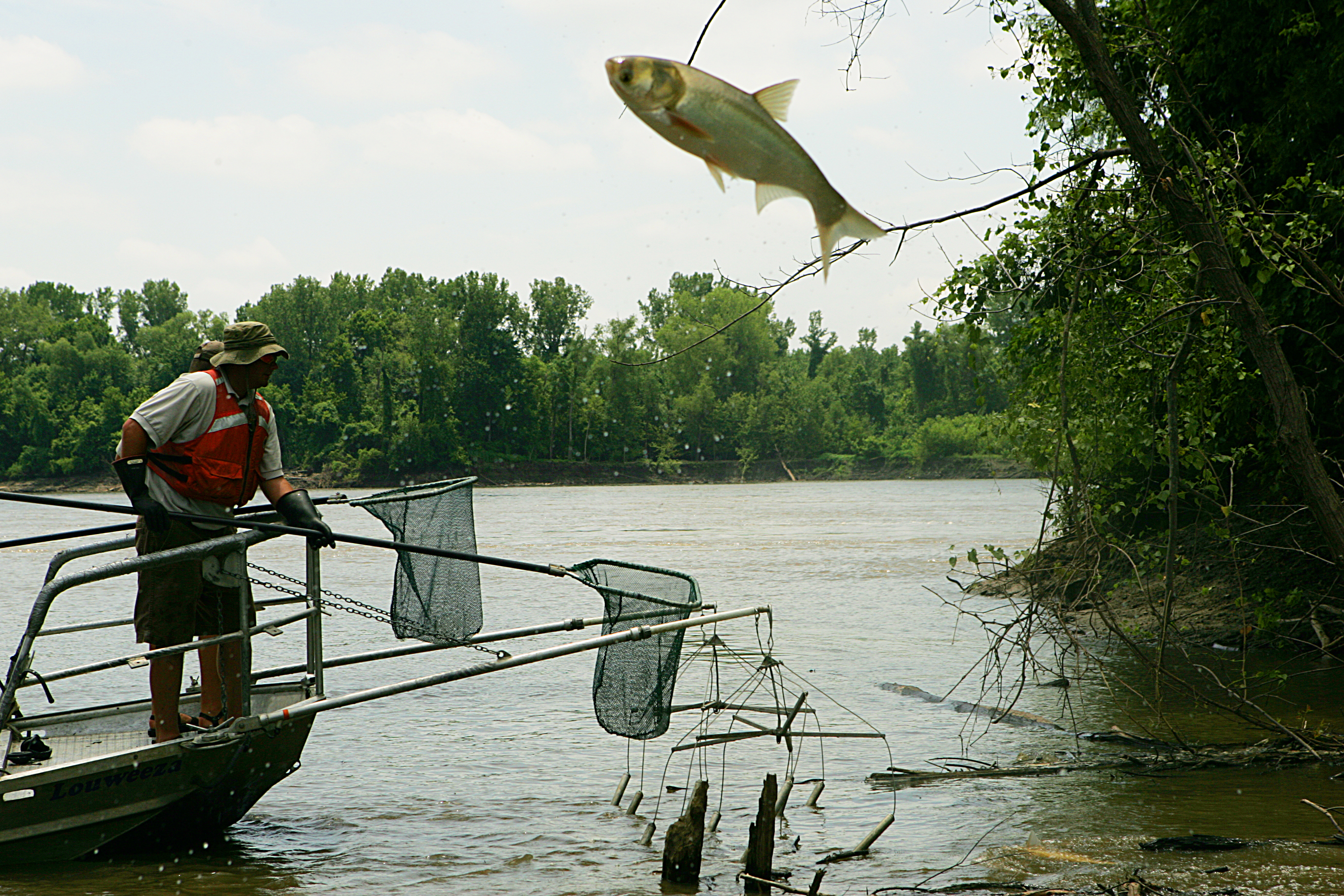
Silver carp jumping out, Missouri

Silver carp are easily frightened by boats, which cause them to leap between 2.5–3.0 metres (8–10 ft) into the air, and numerous boaters have been severely injured by collisions with the fish. According to the Environmental Protection Agency, "reported injuries include cuts from fins, black eyes, broken bones, back injuries, and concussions". This behavior has sometimes been attributed to the very similar bighead carp, but these do not normally jump when frightened. Catching jumping carp in nets has become part of the Redneck Fishing Tournament in Bath, Illinois.

== Recreational fishing ==
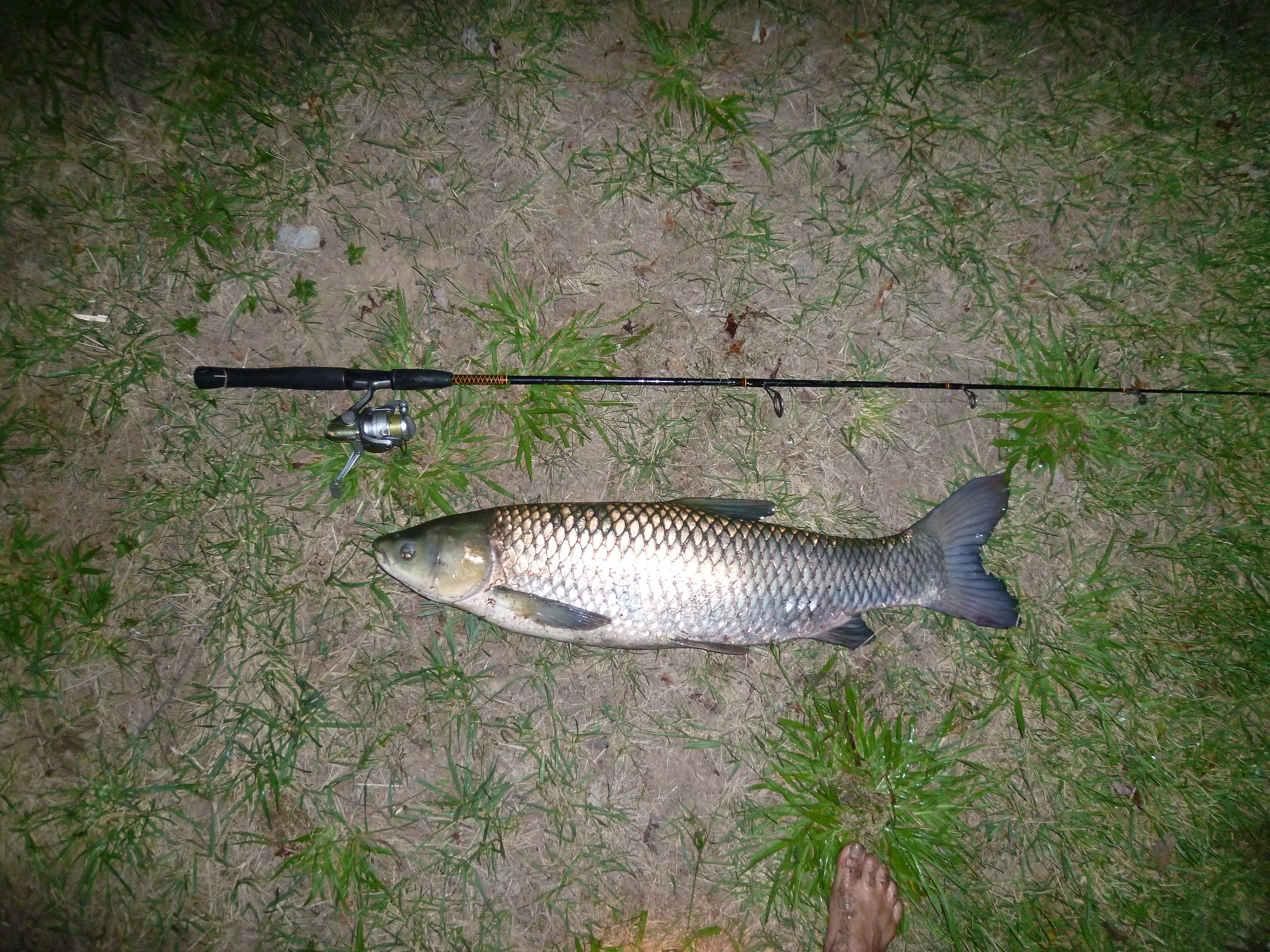
A white amur caught on monofilament fishing line

The grass carp (Ctenopharyngodon idella), and black carp (Mylopharyngodon piceus), as well as common carp (Cyprinus carpio), are popular targets for recreational fishermen in the Midwest, despite their status as invasive species. These species are unique because they can be caught using the traditional fishing technique of a fishing rod, reel, and hook. Other invasive carp species – the Silver carp (Hypophthalmichthys molitrix) and bighead carp (Hypophthalmichthys nobilis) are not traditionally caught on rod and reel because they feed on plankton, therefore they do not bite on baited hooks or lures.

== As food ==
Asian carp have been a popular food fish in Asia for thousands of years. In North America, various Asian carp species are often lumped with the common carp and considered undesirable trash fish because common carp is unpopular as food in this region. Furthermore, even the common carp, which was introduced to North America from Europe in the 17th century, is important food fish outside North America.

The pearly white flesh, though complicated by intermuscular bones, has a mild taste. The filter-feeding silver and bighead carp have much lower heavy metal contamination (such as mercury) than most other fish because they are algivorous primary consumers that do not eat other aquatic invertebrates or fishes and therefore are the least impacted by biomagnification.

The Hangzhou dish West Lake Fish in Vinegar Gravy, traditionally made with white amur, is controversial for its flavor.

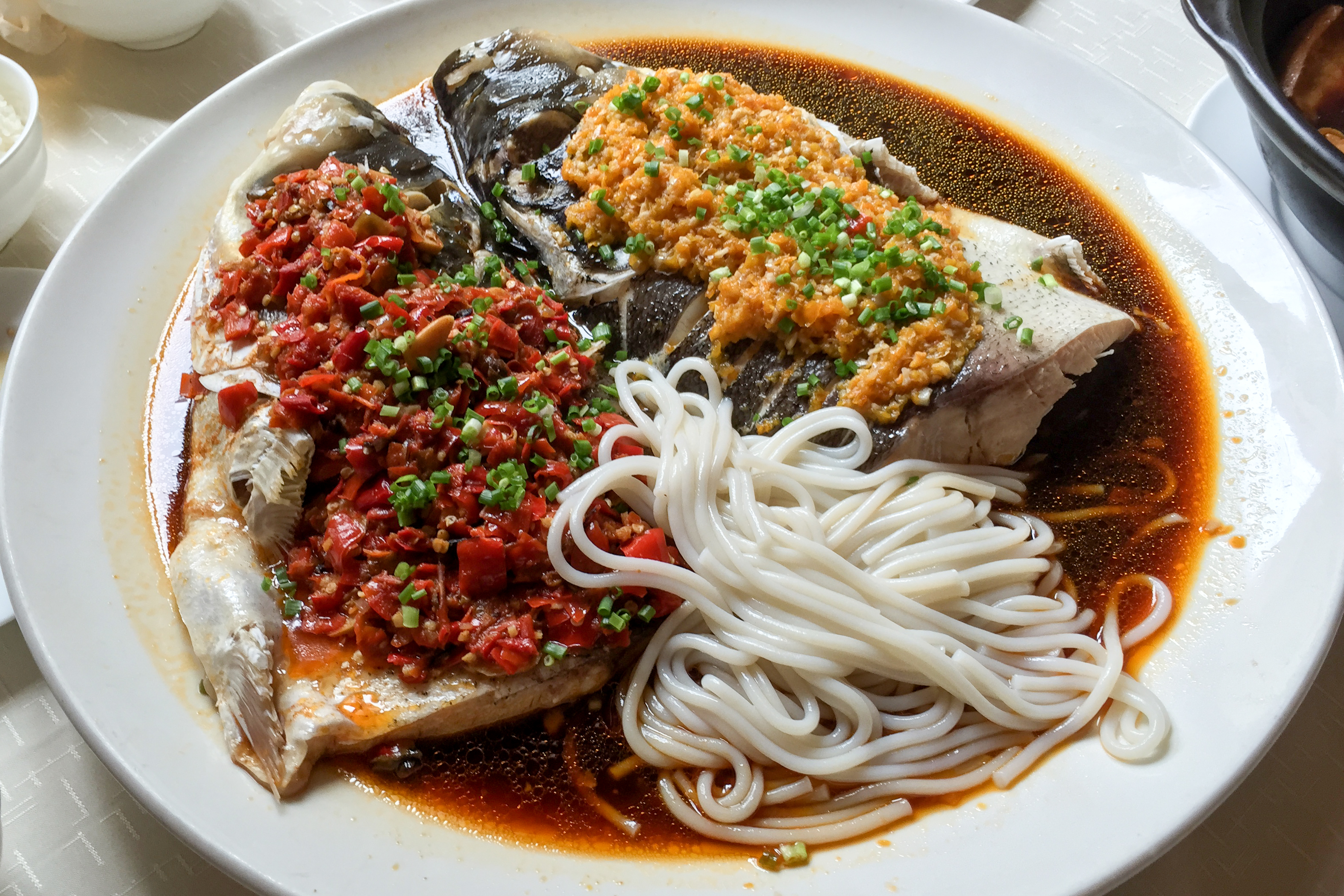
Duo jiao yu tou (剁椒鱼头), steamed bighead carp, served with noodles, Hunan cuisine

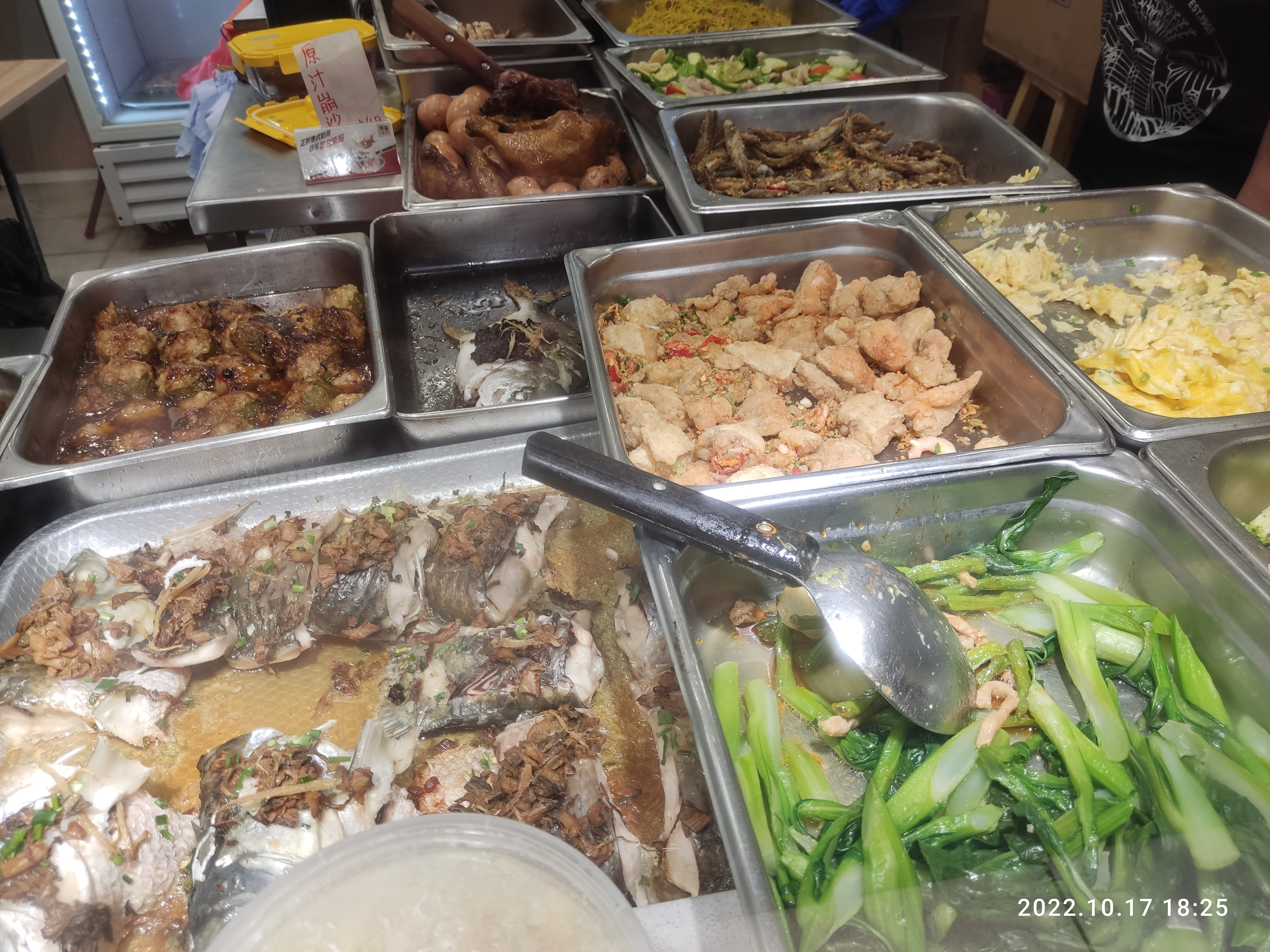
Steamed white amur (蒸鯇魚, front) in a Hong Kong restaurant

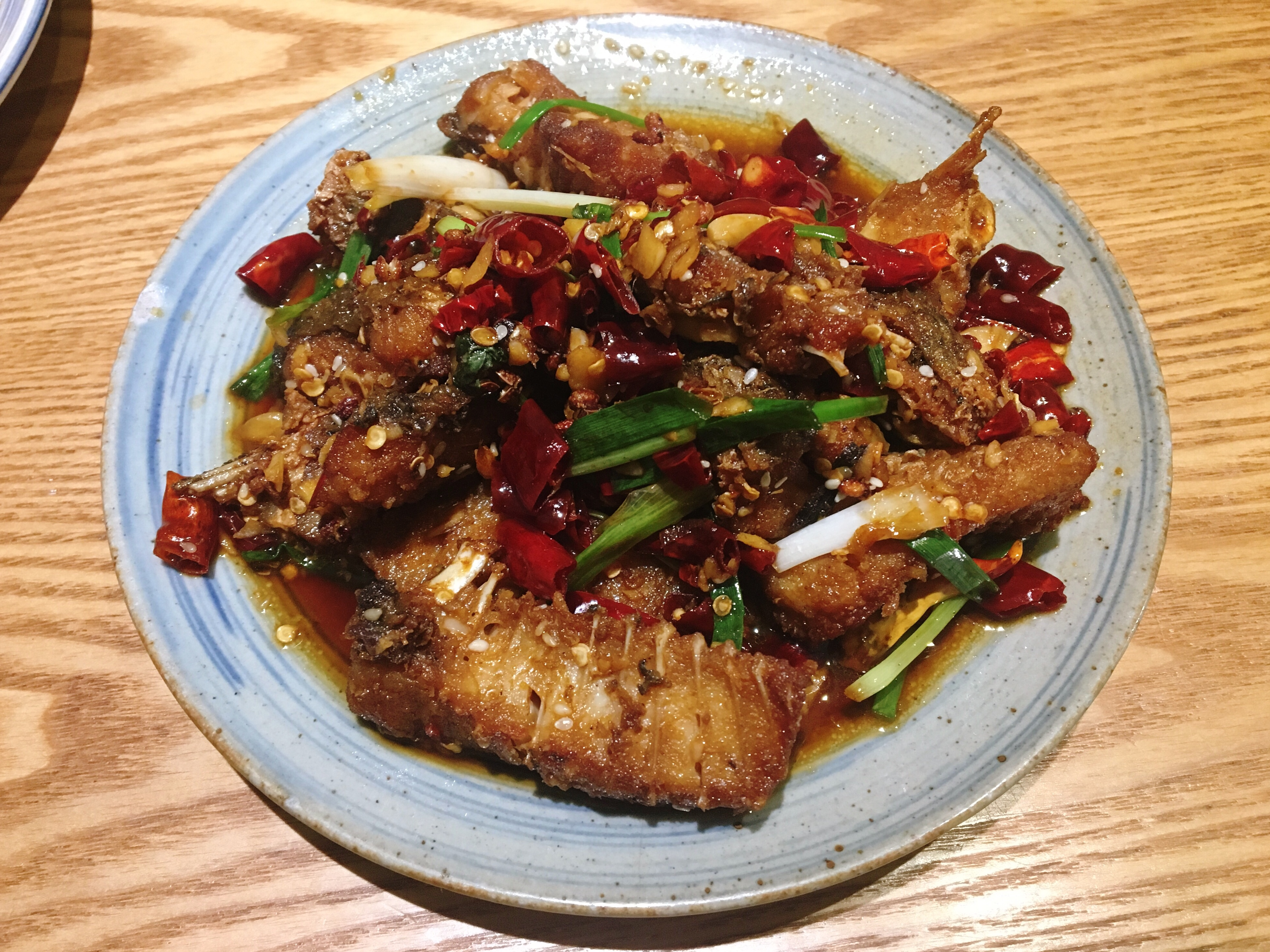
Ciba yu (糍粑鱼), pan-fried marinated white amur, Hubei cuisine

Copi is available in restaurants in Illinois, Arizona, and Washington, DC.; in 7 fish markets in Illinois and Tennessee; and through 7 fish distributors in Illinois, Michigan, New York, Ohio, Maryland, and Wisconsin.

=== Pet food ===
There are companies making pet food using silver carp in the US and Canada.

== As ornamental fish ==
Yuquan (玉泉), one of the well-known scenic spots in Hangzhou, features a large fish pond teeming with hundreds of fish in various colors. As of 2022, many of the fish there are black amur, with additional bighead carp, nishikigoi, sharpbelly and white amur. A three-character inscription, Yu Le Guo (鱼乐国), meaning "fish's paradise", is set above one end of the pond in the calligraphy of a famous gentry-scholar of the late Ming Dynasty named Dong Qichang (董其昌).

== Introduction to North America ==
=== Environmental impact ===
Some species of Asian carp cause harm when they are introduced to new environments, especially when free from the risk of predation and allowed to propagate rapidly. The black carp feeds on native mussels and snails, some of which are already endangered. Grass carp can alter the food webs of a new environment by altering the communities of plants, invertebrates, and fish. Silver carp feed on the plankton necessary for larval fish and native mussels.

Bighead and silver carp feed by filtering plankton from the water. Their escape and settlement throughout the Mississippi and its connecting waterways have raised great concern about the health of historic biodiversity, with their extremely high abundance placing greater pressure on competition for food and space. Due to their filter-feeding habits as well, their populations are made more difficult to capture and control as conventional angling methods are less effective.

The disruption these species impose on food web dynamics has also cascaded into economic losses for regional industries, hurting businesses reliant on local biodiversity and habitat health. Both recreational and commercial fishermen have been forced out of typical fisheries due to carp disruption, all the while tourism and boating are impacted by declining environmental health and safety concerns from leaping silver carp.

=== History ===
In the late 19th century, the common carp was widely distributed throughout the United States by the United States Fish Commission as a food fish. In the 1970s, fish farmers in mostly southern states began importing Asian carp from China to help clean their commercial ponds—consuming unwanted biomass to regulate overgrowth and parasitic establishment. However, escaping these aquaculture facilities, carp have overtaken surrounding waterways, distributing via sanitation canals, commercial passages, and by flooding into untouched waters. The rise in the populations of bighead and silver carp has been dramatic where they are established in the Mississippi River basin.

Because of their prominence and the fact that they were introduced to the United States much later than other Asian carp species, the term "Asian carp" is often used to refer specifically to grass, black, silver, and bighead carp. In the U.S., Asian carp are considered to be invasive species. Of the carp species introduced to the United States, only two (crucian and black carp) are not known to be firmly established. Crucian carp is probably extirpated. Since 2003, however, several adults, fertile black carp have been captured from the Atchafalaya and other rivers connected to the Mississippi River. Dr. Leo Nico, in the book Black carp: Biological Synopsis and Risk Assessment of an Introduced Fish, reports that black carp are probably established in the United States. In South Florida, the local water management district stocks the canals with sterilized grass carp to control the hydrilla plant, which tends to clog the locks and drainage valves that regulate water flow from the Everglades.

=== Distribution ===
Bighead, silver, and grass carp are known to be well-established in the Mississippi River basin (including tributaries), where they at times reach extremely high numbers, especially in the case of the bighead and silver carp. Bighead, silver, and grass carp have been captured in that watershed from Louisiana to South Dakota, Minnesota, and Ohio. Grass carp are also established in at least one other watershed, in Texas, and may be established elsewhere.

Asian carp, Shedd Aquarium, Chicago

Grass carp have been captured in all of the Great Lakes except Lake Superior, but so far, no evidence indicates a reproducing population. No silver carp or black carp have yet been found in any of the Great Lakes. Common carp are abundant throughout the Great Lakes.

A few bighead and grass carp have been captured in Canada's portions of the Great Lakes, but no Asian carp (other than common carp) is known to be established in Canada at this time. Concerns exist that the silver carp may spread into Cypress Hills in Alberta and Saskatchewan through Battle Creek, the Frenchman River, and other rivers flowing south out of the hills into the Milk River. Ontario does not have Asian carp yet and has used the provincial Invasive Species Act to prohibit their import.

In Mexico, grass carp have been established for many years in at least two river systems, where they are considered invasive, but no other Asian carp are known to have been introduced.

== Management in the US ==
=== Field actions ===
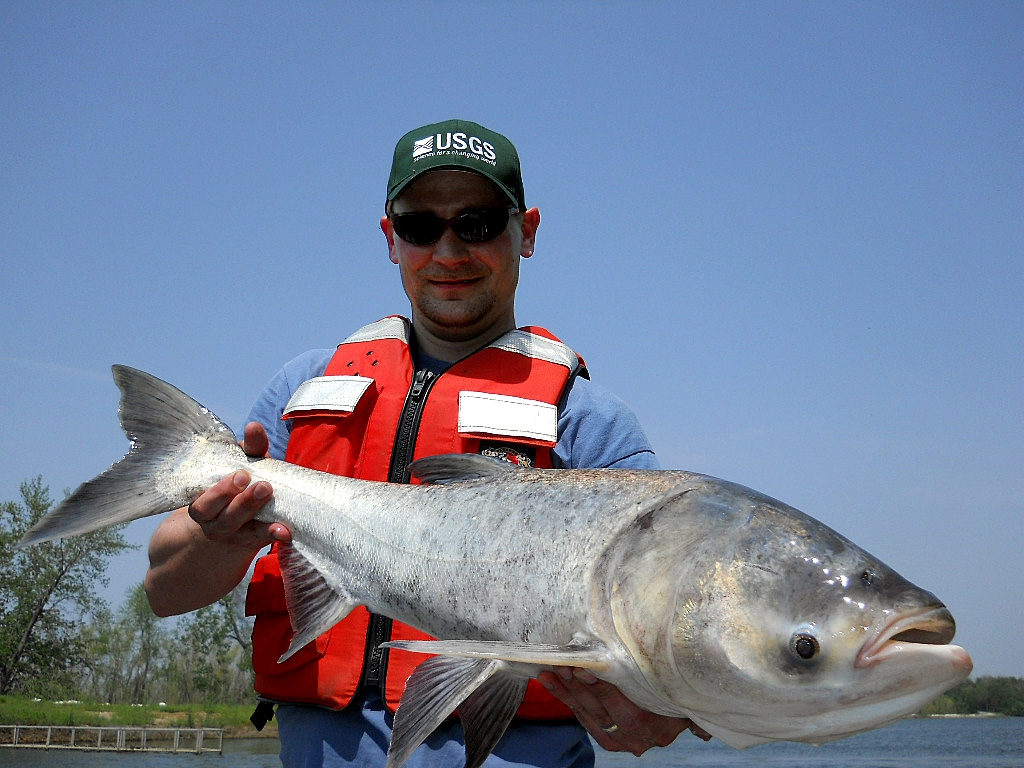
A bighead carp held by a U.S. Geological Survey researcher

These fish are thought to be highly detrimental to the environment in parts of the United States. Because of these concerns, the U.S. Fish and Wildlife Service convened stakeholders to develop a national plan for the management and control of invasive Asian carp (referring to bighead, silver, black, and grass carp). The plan was accepted by the National Aquatic Nuisance Species Task Force in the fall of 2007.

As of 2016, efforts were underway to reintroduce alligator gar between Tennessee and Illinois as part of a program to control Asian carp.

In 2019, Kentucky declared "War on Carp" and started to use electrofishing and sonic devices to remove 5 million pounds of Asian carp from Lake Barkley and Kentucky Lake.

Electrofishing has become an extensive technique for managing Asian carp populations throughout the Midwest's river systems. It involves using electric waves to stun (non-lethally) invasive fish at the water's surface, where fishermen can then corral them into a net and remove them from the ecosystem. Electrofishing is also safe for the native species of fish that cohabit the waters where it is implemented, because they avoid the electrofishing boats by diving deeper into the water column, where as the carp jump near the surface, getting stunned in the process.

Conclusive results have shown that electrofishing is an effective and efficient method for managing the Asian carp invasion in Midwestern waterways. A typical electrofishing boat can shock 100 carp per minute of fishing, using 110–500 volts. The fish captured are then humanely killed and used as food or fertilizer for crops. However, the technique has sparked questions about potential negative impacts that it may have on the rivers' ecosystems. If electrofishing boats go over spawning grounds for native fish, it could potentially cause harm to fish embryos.

=== Branding ===
In June 2022, the Illinois Department of Natural Resources announced a campaign to rebrand Asian carp as Copi, which is a clipping of "copious", referring to the large amount of the fish in the US. This branding work was completed in 2022 by Span. The Copi renaming is a part of a Federal and state initiative to get the public to eat the invasive fish, decrease its numbers in Midwestern waterways, and prevent its introduction to the Great Lakes.

The United States Environmental Protection Agency (EPA)'s Great Lakes Restoration Initiative (GLRI) is funding the Copi rebrand of Asian carp.

The success of the Copi rebrand of the invasive fish will be measured by pounds removed. Removal was projected to total six million pounds at the launch of the Copi rebrand, and increase to 12 million pounds in the first year following. Removal at two months from launch exceeded ten million pounds and is on pace to beat year one projections.

=== Legislation ===
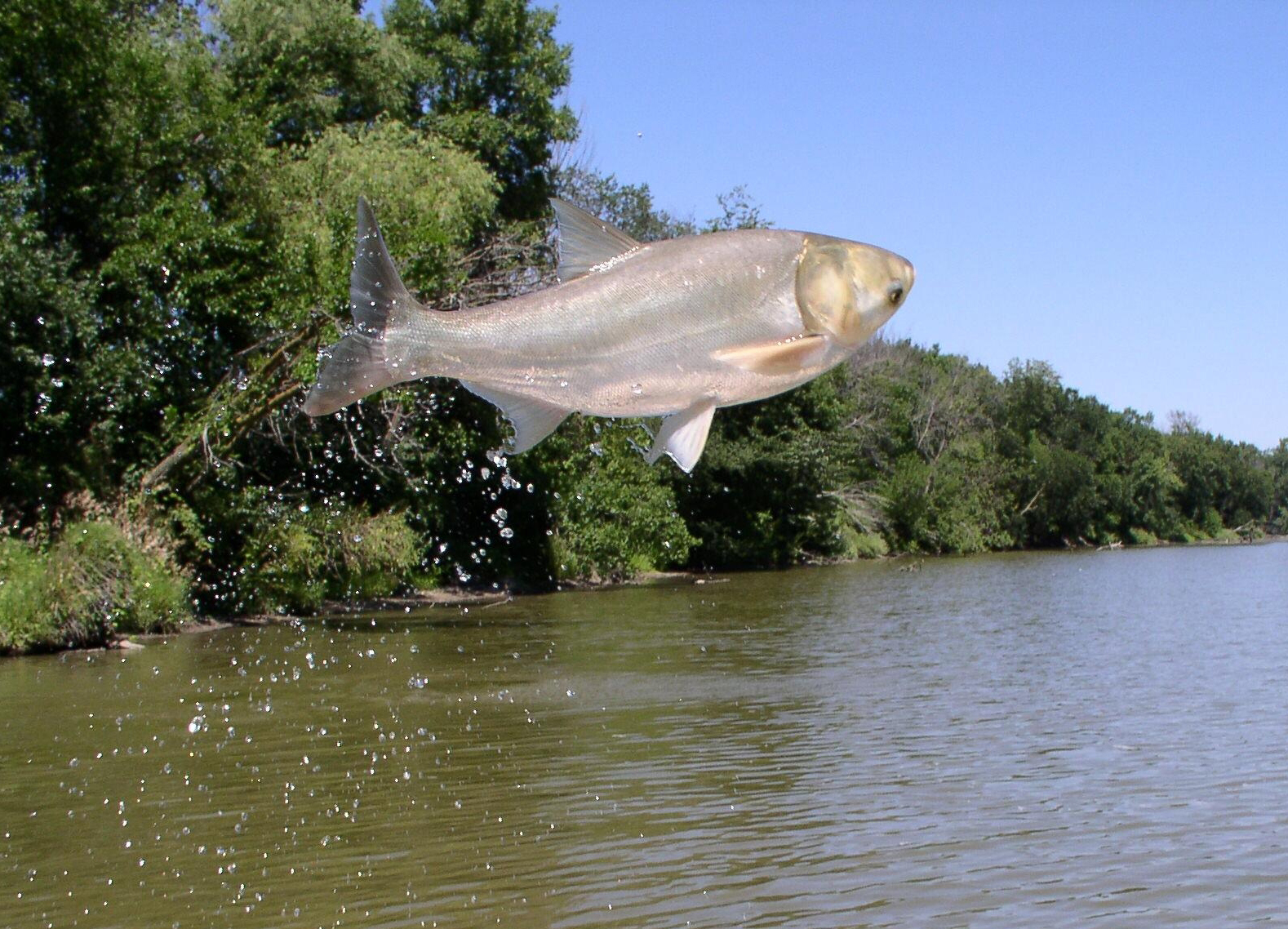
A jumping silver carp

One of the first actions in response to decades of carp entrenchment was the passage of the Water Resources and Development Act of 2007, which mandated a survey of the impacts and prevention of various nuisance species. This policy, declared the Great Lakes and Mississippi River Interbasin Survey (GLMRIS), would be overseen by the Secretary of the Army and U.S. Army Corps of Civil Engineers (USACE) to form initial insight to the risk of invasive organisms throughout regional waters. The foundational understanding gleamed by the survey was further expanded in the Stop Asian Carp Act of 2011, requiring the Secretary of the Army to study the feasibility of the hydrological separation within the Great Lakes and Mississippi River basins. 30 days were provided per the act for the Secretary of the Army to begin a study, researching techniques to inhibit carp spread by flooding, wastewater and storm water infrastructure, waterway safety operations, and barge and recreational traffic.

In 2012, the U.S. Senate and House introduced new bills expediting some items of the Stop Asian Carp Act of 2011, aimed at enhancing resistance to Asian carp spread into the Great Lakes. The legislation provides direction to the U.S. Army Corps of Engineers to complete their study within 18 months on how to separate the Great Lakes from the Mississippi watersheds.

After both studies into the risk and prevention of Asian carp within the Midwest were completed, the knowledge gained would inform policy that same year, with the passage of the Water Resources Reform and Management Act of 2014. Specifically, Congress authorized the U.S. Fish and Wildlife Service (USFWS), in conjunction with supportive state entities and local organizations, to lead a multi-agency effort to halt the spread. However, in contrast to the branching dispersal of carp, this project was limited in scope to the Upper Mississippi and Ohio River Basins—neglecting waterways not feeding the Great Lakes. Yet this was remedied when the Water Resources Development Act of 2020 was enacted, expanding the scope of protected waters and taking a step toward the use of preventive technology. Regarding the first, this policy amended the prior jurisdiction of agencies to oversee all Mississippi basins now and connecting waterways. Then, funding and authority was allocated to the Secretary of the Army and Associated USACE to undertake research programs and infrastructure projects dedicated to barring carp passage through vulnerable bottlenecks.

$25 million was allocated by Congress toward testing numerous barriers in the Tennessee and Cumberland river basins. These include the deployment of bubble columns and sound systems designed to act on the sensitivities in carp species to corral their movement. Combining these new deterrents, bulwarks like the Brandon Road Interbasin Project were drafted, aimed at enabling commercial travel between the Mississippi and Great Lakes whilst protecting the habitats and industries beyond its defense. But it was only until April 2023 when a new, extensive plan created by the Invasive Carp Regional Coordinating Committee officially launched it, and over 50 other projects, into motion. The committee, in partnership with 26 U.S. and Canadian federal, state, provincial, tribal, regional and local agencies, seeks to innovate on new technologies and strategies toward controlling Asian carp establishment in the Great Lakes.

The 2023 Invasive Carp Action Plan includes the following:

- The Brandon Road Project, led by the U.S. Army Corps of Engineers, aims to prevent carp from entering the Great Lakes by establishing structural and non-structural control measures in Will County, Illinois.
- The Department of Natural Resources (DNR) is working with the committee to upgrade sections of the earthen berm at Little Killbuck Creek, Ohio. This location has a hydraulic connection between the Mississippi River and the Lake Erie watershed when water levels are high. This project aims to close this aquatic pathway to invasive carp and further prevent their spread into Lake Erie.
- Operating electric dispersal barriers in the Chicago Area Waterway System, to include the Chicago Sanitary and Ship Canal that connects to Lake Michigan.
- The U.S. Army Corps of Engineers will also conduct experiments with new technologies in underwater acoustics and carbon dioxide deterrent barriers to prevent the migration of invasive carp into the Great Lakes region.
- The Department of Natural Resources will also organize commercial fishing of the invasive carp species in the upper Illinois River to reduce the population and the risk of upstream expansion northward.

== See also ==
- Green crab
- Lionfish
- List of cloned animals
