= Span =

Span may refer to:

== Science, technology and engineering ==
- Span (unit), the width of a human hand
- Span (engineering), a section between two intermediate supports
- Wingspan, the distance between the wingtips of a bird or aircraft
- Sorbitan esters, also known as a spans
- Nebbiolo, an Italian wine grape also known as Span

=== Mathematics ===
- Linear span, or simply span, in linear algebra
- Span (category theory)

=== Computing ===
- Span, a collection type representing a contiguous sequence of object or memory
  - System.Span<T>, a .NET Framework (C#) class for working with contiguous sequences of objects or stack-allocated arrays
  - std::span<T> and std::mdspan<T>, C++ classes for working with one-dimensional and multi-dimensional (respectively) array views
- <span>, an HTML element; See div and span
- Switched Port Analyzer, Cisco implementation of port mirroring
- Smartphone ad hoc network
- Critical path length in analysis of parallel algorithms

== Other uses ==
- Span (band), a Norwegian rock band
- Span (design firm), an American design studio
- SPAN magazine, a publication of the US Embassy, New Delhi, India; see former editor V. D. Trivadi
- Saudi Payments Network
- CME SPAN, Standard Portfolio Analysis of Risk, for futures contracts
- Span Developments, former UK builder

== People ==
- Span (surname)
- Span., taxonomic author abbreviation of Johan Baptist Spanoghe (1798–1838), Dutch botanical collector
