= Spanner (disambiguation) =

A spanner is a kind of hand tool.

Spanner may also refer to:

== Technology and engineering ==
- Adjustable spanner
- Spanner, a brand of prostatic stent
- Spanner (database), distributed database technology developed by Google
- Spanner (screw drive), a type of screw drive that consists of two holes in the screw head and two pins on the tool

== Arts and entertainment ==
- Spanner (journal), a former British periodical
- Spanners (album), by The Black Dog
- Spanner Films, a company founded by film director Franny Armstrong
- A Spanner in the Works, a Rod Stewart album
- Spanner, a fictional character in Reborn! cartoons
- Ralph Spanner, a fictional character in Round the Twist
- Spanner, a fictional character in Marvel Comics
- Spanner Banner, Jamaican reggae and dancehall musician

== Other uses ==
- Spanner (surname)
- Operation Spanner, a British police investigation
  - Spanner Trust, a UK BDSM activist group, set up after the operation
- Spanner graph, several mathematical concepts; See K-spanner (disambiguation)

== See also ==
- Dick Spanner, P.I., a British animation series
