= K-spanner =

K-spanner may refer to:

- Graph spanner
- Tree spanner
- Geometric spanner

== See also ==
- Spanner (disambiguation)
