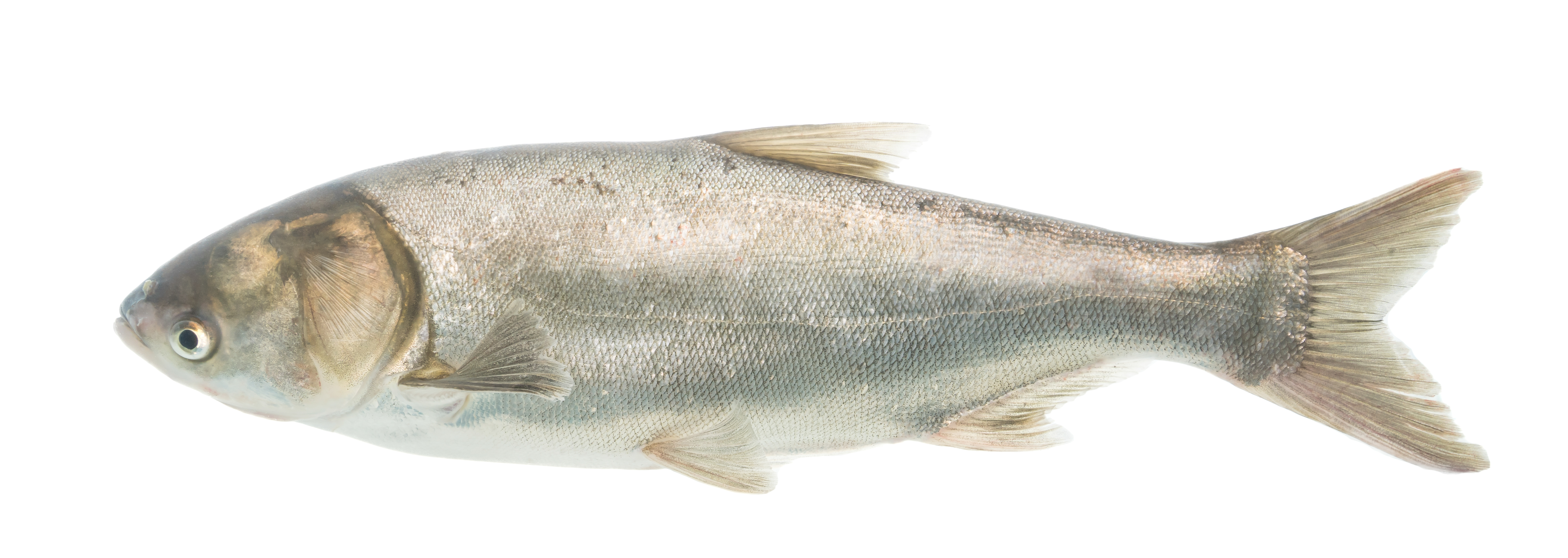

Conservation status
- Near Threatened (IUCN 3.1)

Scientific classification
- Kingdom: Animalia
- Phylum: Chordata
- Class: Actinopterygii
- Division: Teleostei
- Order: Cypriniformes
- Suborder: Cyprinoidei
- Family: Xenocyprididae
- Genus: Hypophthalmichthys
- Species: H. molitrix

Binomial name
- Hypophthalmichthys molitrix (Valenciennes, 1844)

Synonyms
- List: Leuciscus molitrix Valenciennes, 1844; Leuciscus hypophthalmus Richardson, 1845; Cephalus mantschuricus Basilewsky, 1855; Onychodon mantschuricus (Basilewsky, 1855); Abramocephalus microlepis Steindachner, 1869; Hypophthalmichthys dabryi Guichenot, 1871; Hypophthalmichthys dybowskii Herzenstein, 1888

= Silver carp =

Species of fish

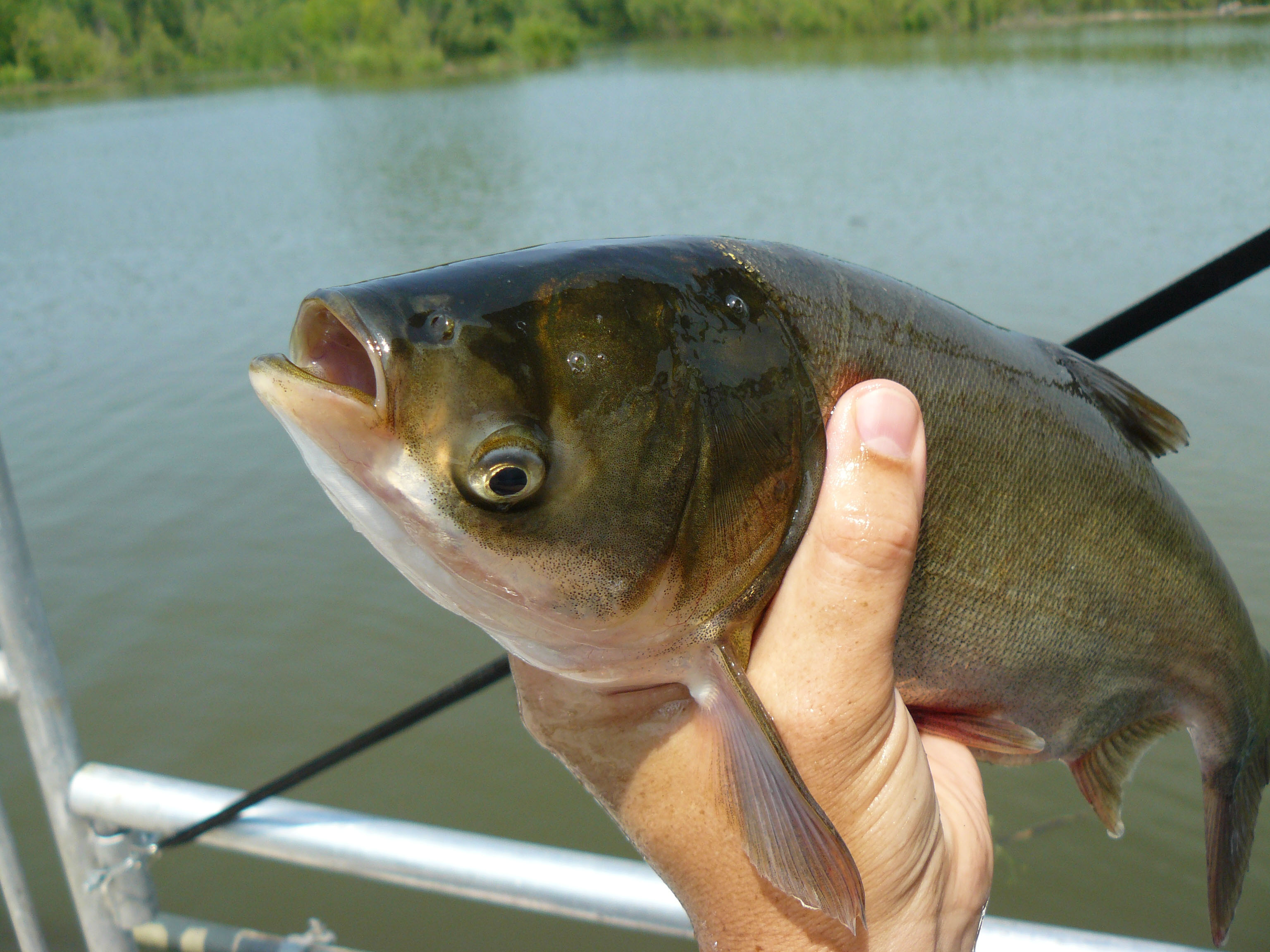
Silver carp caught in Michigan

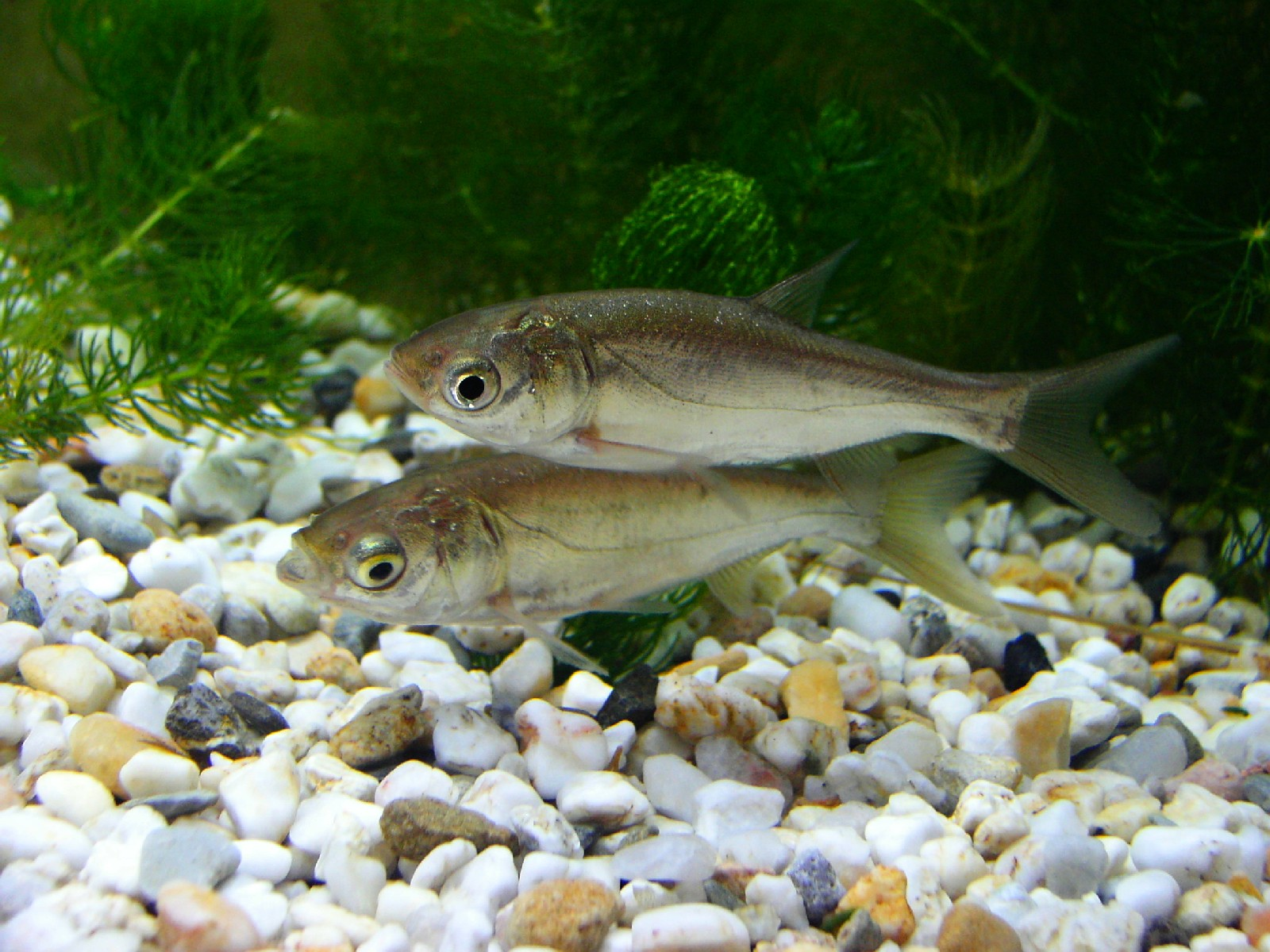
Juveniles

Global aquaculture production of Silver carp (Hypophthalmichthys molitrix) in million tonnes from 1950 to 2022, as reported by the FAO

The silver carp or silverfin (Hypophthalmichthys molitrix) is a species of freshwater cyprinid fish, a variety of Asian carp native to China and eastern Siberia, from the Amur River drainage in the north to the Xi Jiang River drainage in the south. Although a threatened species in its natural habitat, it has long been cultivated in China as one of the "four famous domestic fish" (四大家鱼) together with bighead carp, black carp, and grass carp. By weight, more silver carp are produced worldwide in aquaculture than any other species of fish except for the grass carp. Silver carp are usually farmed in polyculture with other Asian carp, or sometimes with catla or other fish species.

The species has also been introduced, or spread by connected waterways, to at least 88 countries around the world. The reason for importation was generally for use in aquaculture, but enhancement of wild fisheries and water quality control have also been intended on occasion. In some of these places, the species is considered invasive.

The silver carp reaches a typical length of 60–100 cm (24–39 in) with a maximum length of 140 cm (55 in) and weight of 50 kg (110 lb).

== Diet ==
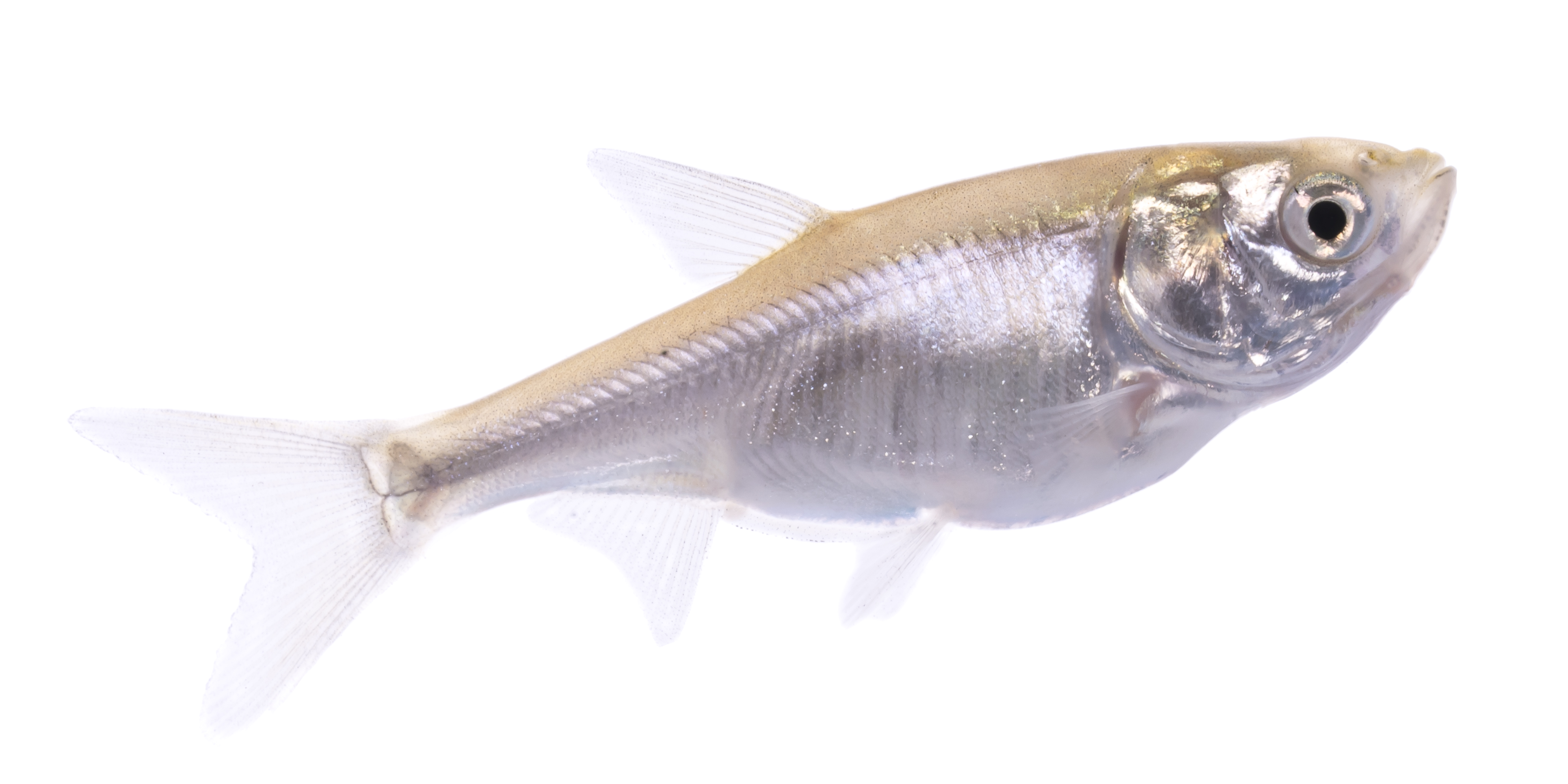
2 inch long juvenile at Gavins Point National Fish Hatchery

The silver carp is a filter feeder, and possesses a specialized feeding apparatus capable of filtering particles as small as 4 μm. The gill rakers are fused into a sponge-like filter, and an epibranchial organ secretes mucus, which assists in trapping small particles. A strong buccal pump forces water through this filter. Silver carp, like all Hypophthalmichthys species, have no stomachs; they are thought to feed more or less constantly, largely on phytoplankton, and also consume zooplankton and detritus. In places where this plankton-feeding species has been introduced, it is thought to compete with native planktivorous fishes, which in North America include paddlefish (Polyodon spathula), bigmouth buffalo (Ictiobus cyprinellus), gizzard shad (Dorosoma cepedianum), and young fish of almost all species.

Because they feed on plankton, they are sometimes successfully used for controlling water quality, especially in the control of noxious blue-green algae (cyanobacteria). Certain species of blue-green algae, notably the often toxic Microcystis, can pass through the gut of silver carp unharmed, picking up nutrients in the process. Thus, in some cases, blue-green algae blooms have been exacerbated by silver carp, and Microcystis has also been shown to produce more toxins in the presence of silver carp. These carp, which have natural defenses to their toxins, sometimes can contain enough algal toxins in their systems to become hazardous to eat.

== Ecology and conservation ==
Silver carp in their natural range migrate upstream for spawning; eggs and larvae then drift downstream, and young fish hatch in the floodplain zone. Larvae and small juveniles feed on zooplankton, switching to phytoplankton once a certain size is reached. The species is somewhat sensitive to low oxygen conditions.

The species is currently classified as near threatened in its original range, as its habitat and reproductive behavior are impacted by construction of dams, pollution, and overfishing. Population declines appear to have been particularly significant in the Chinese parts of its range.

In the Volga River basin, the Silver carp and Bighead carp are primarily found in the reservoirs of the Lower Volga, the unregulated part, and the delta. There is evidence of natural reproduction (prelarval and early fry stages) in the lower zone of the Volga River Delta.

== Sport fishing ==
Silver carp are filter feeders, thus are difficult to catch on typical hook-and-line gear. Special methods have been developed for these fish, the most important being the "suspension method", usually consisting of a large dough ball that disintegrates slowly, surrounded by a nest of tiny hooks embedded in the bait. The entire apparatus is suspended below a large bobber. The fish feed on the small particles released from the dough ball and bump against the dough ball, with the intention of breaking off more small particles that can be filtered from the water, eventually becoming hooked on the tiny hooks.

In some areas, using "snagging gear", in which large, weighted treble hooks are jerked through the water, is legal to snag the fish. In the United States, silver carp are also popular targets for bowfishing; they are shot both in the water and in the air. In the latter case, powerboats are used to scare the fish and entice them to jump out of the water, and the fish are shot when they are airborne.

== Related species ==
Two other species are in the genus Hypophthalmichthys, the bighead carp (H. nobilis) and the largescale silver carp (H. harmandi). The genus name Aristichthys has also sometimes been used for bighead carp, but is deprecated. The bighead carp differs from the silver carp in its behavior (it does not leap from the water when startled) and also in its diet. Bighead carp are also filter feeders, but they filter larger particles than silver carp, and in general consume a greater proportion of zooplankton in their diets than silver carp, which consume more phytoplankton. In at least some parts of the United States, bighead and silver carp hybridize in the wild and produce fertile offspring.

The largescale silver carp is closely related to the silver carp, but its native range is to the south of that of the silver carp, mostly within Vietnam. Unlike bighead and silver carp, largescale silver carp have not been widely introduced around the world for use in aquaculture, although at least one introduction was made to some waters of the Soviet Union, where they hybridized with the introduced silver carp.

== In North America ==
Silver carp were imported to North America in the 1970s to control algal growth in aquaculture and municipal wastewater treatment facilities, but escaped from captivity soon after their importation, and are now considered a highly invasive species.

Silver carp, with the closely related bighead carp, often reach extremely high population densities, and are known to have undesirable effects on the local environments and native species, including the bigmouth buffalo. They have spread into the Mississippi, Illinois, Ohio, Missouri, Tennessee, Wabash Rivers, and many of their tributaries in the United States, and are abundant in the Mississippi catchment from Louisiana to South Dakota and Illinois. Dams seem to have slowed their advance up the Mississippi River, and until late November 2008, silver carp had not been captured north of central Iowa on the Mississippi. Dams that do not have navigation locks are complete barriers to natural upstream movement of silver carp, unless fishermen unintentionally assist this movement by the use of silver carp as bait.

In 2020, Alabama Department of Conservation and Natural Resources found silver carp in Alabama's Pickwick and Wheeler reservoirs on the Tennessee River, but the species has not expanded its range in Alabama's waterways.

The Tennessee Valley Authority (TVA) has considered several methods to control the spread of Asian carp, including fish barriers at 10 locks controlled by the TVA. One is a bioacoustics fish fence, which uses a combination of sound, light, and air bubbles. These barriers are installed at Barkley Lock and Dam in Kentucky and are currently being studied for their effectiveness in deterring Asian carp. Other types of barriers used for Asian carp include carbon dioxide and electricity. The TVA has conducted environmental impact studies to minimize the impact of the barriers on native species. The TVA has also considered adjusting flow rates during Asian carp spawning periods, which are usually during high-water events, as Asian carp eggs are only semibuoyant and sink to the bottom and die with low river flow.

Silver carp jumping out of the Illinois River

The silver carp is sometimes called the "flying" carp for its tendency to leap from the water when startled; it can leap up to 10 ft (3.0 m) into the air. Boaters traveling in uncovered high-speed watercraft have been reported to be injured by running into airborne fish while at speed. A leaping silver carp broke the jaw of a teenager being pulled on an inner tube, and water skiing in areas where silver carp are present is extremely dangerous. Peculiarly, the extreme jumping behavior appears to be unique to silver carp of North America; those in their native Asian range and introduced to other parts of the world are much less prone to jumping. Although theories have been proposed (for example, the high densities the species reaches in parts of North America, or that the introduced North American population may have been based on a small number of particularly "jumpy" individuals), the reason for these geographic differences is not known for certain.
