= Spann =

Spann is a surname. Notable people with the surname include:

- Alexi Spann, American breaststroke swimmer
- Antwain Spann, American football player
- Gloria Carter Spann, sister of former American president Jimmy Carter
- James Spann, American meteorologist
- Johnny Micheal Spann, Central Intelligence Agency paramilitary operations officer
- Othmar Spann, Austrian philosopher
- Otis Spann, American blues musician
- Pervis Spann, American radio broadcaster
- Scott Spann (swimmer), American swimmer
- Silvio Spann, Trinidad and Tobagonian footballer

== See also ==
- Span (surname)
