= West Lake Fish in Vinegar Gravy =

Chinese seafood dish

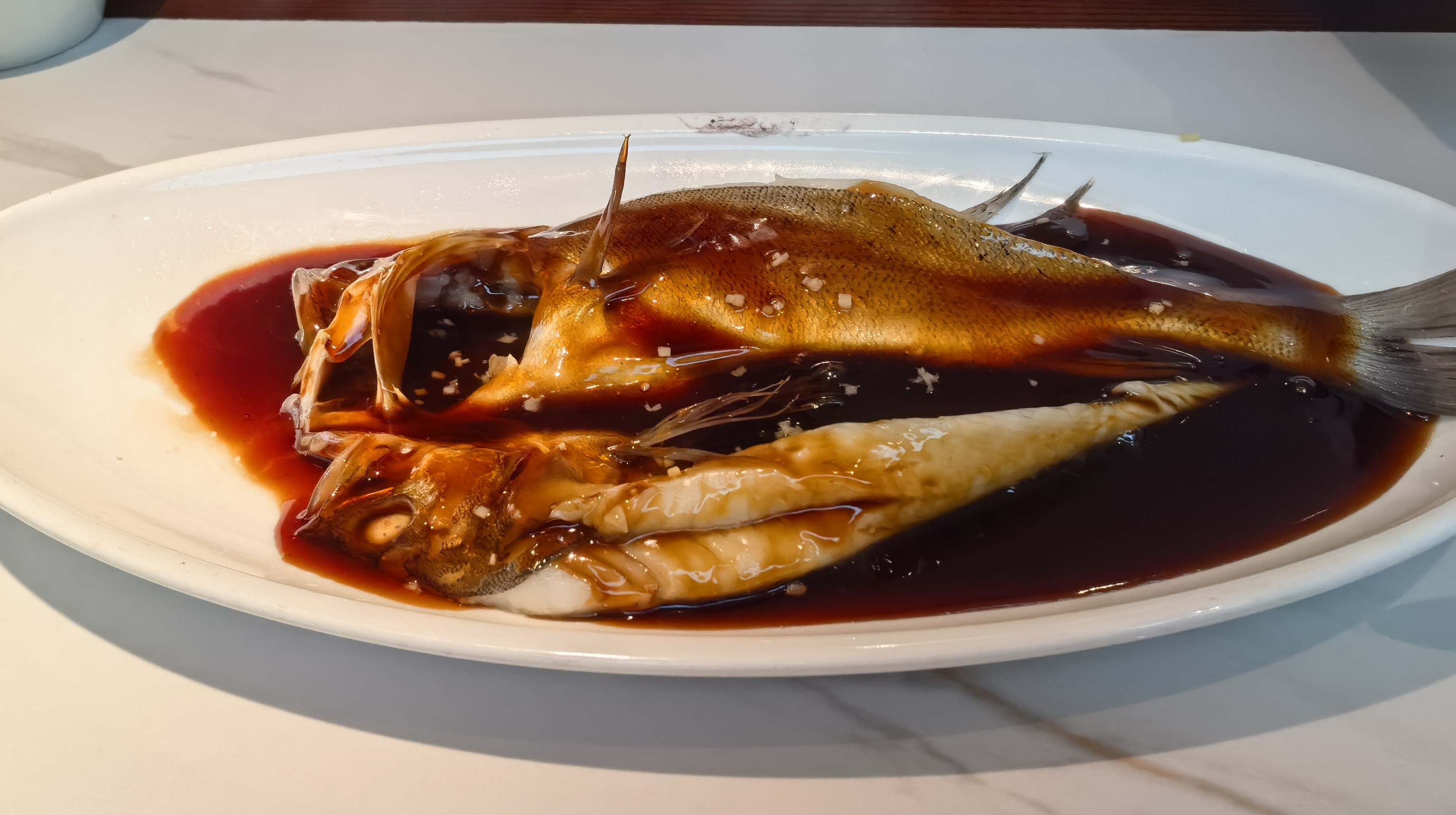
West Lake Fish in Vinegar Gravy

West Lake Fish in Vinegar Gravy (Chinese: 西湖醋鱼; pinyin: xīhúcùyú), also known as Song Sao Fish (宋嫂鱼; sòngsǎoyú), is a traditional local specialty dish of Hangzhou in Zhejiang. It first originated in Southern Song dynasty. The material of West Lake Fish in Vinegar Gravy usually is the grass carp. After cooking, the chef will pour the smooth sugar and vinegar on the fish, which will cause the pectoral fin to stand up. In this way, the fish is tender and sweet with special crab flavor.

== Component ==
=== Main ingredients ===
Grass carp, vinegar and sugar.

=== Seasoning ===
Rice wine, ginger, scallion and starch.

== History and development ==
West Lake Fish in Vinegar Gravy originated from the Linan (now is known as Hangzhou) of Southern Song Dynasty. To inform the history of the West Lake Fish in Vinegar Gravy, one has to start with the "Sister Song's Fish Soup" from Hangzhou in the Southern Song Dynasty.

Song Wusao was a famous female folk chef in the Southern Song Dynasty. One day, the Emperor Zhao Gou took a dragon boat to sail on the West Lake. When he once tasted the fish soup, he greatly praised the dish and Song Wusao. Hence, Song Wusao owned the graceful and famous reputation and fame, who then was called the "master" of fish cooking. From then on, Song Wusao and "Sister Song's Fish Soup" became famed and famous in the later ages. Later, the fish soup was updated by other famous chefs, which finally became the famous dish, West Lake Fish in Vinegar Gravy.

West Lake Fish in Vinegar Gravy is available at several restaurants in Hangzhou. It is not a common dish in residents' daily lives. And the grass carp in this dish has been replaced by bass in some restaurants.

== Features ==
The selection of the fish is careful. Chef typically selects the grass carp within one and a half catty. Because the weight of the fish is closely related to the time control and the heat control. During cuisine, the fire and the heat need to be strictly controlled. And the fish can only be cooked properly in three or four minutes. The fish has a special crab flavor taste.

West Lake Fish in Vinegar is shiny without oil, salty without salt, fresh without MSG.

== Legend anecdote ==
It is said that there was two brothers who made a living by fishing, Song and his brother. The local villain Zhao once visited the West Lake and saw a beauty, who was Song's wife. After realizing that the beauty was Song's wife, Zhao killed Song to marry the beauty. Because Zhao had cooperated with local government, Song's wife and the younger brother had no way to fight against Zhao. Song's wife asked the younger brother to escape in case of the revenge from Zhao. Song's wife cooked the fish with sugar and vinegar as farewell. The younger brother felt very strange to have fish with sugar and vinegar, which he had never tried before. Song's wife explained that the sweet flavor could support the younger brother to fight for a better life, and the sour flavor reminded him about the bad life the poor had. Song's younger brother moved a lot and worked hard after leaving Hangzhou. Several years later, Song's younger brother became an authority and put the villain into jail. When Song's younger brother wanted to find his sister-in-law, he couldn't because Song's wife hid away from the villain. One day when the younger brother had a lunch in a restaurant, he found that the fish was tasted just like the fish cooked by his sister-in-law. He asked who the chef was and found that the chef was his sister-in-law in surprise. Then the younger brother took Song's wife home and quit the job and made a living by fishing again.
