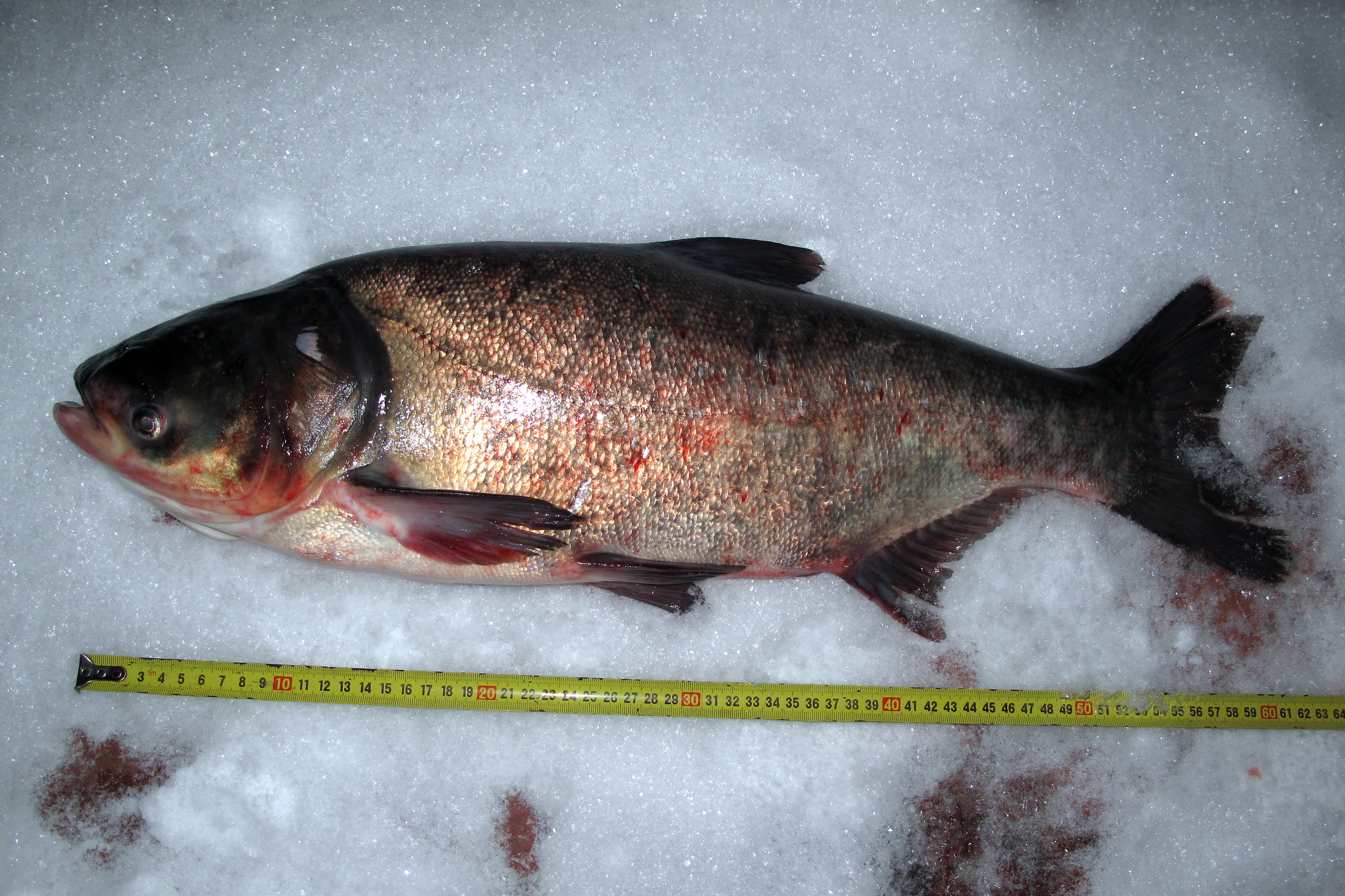
- Bighead carp

Scientific classification
- Kingdom: Animalia
- Phylum: Chordata
- Class: Actinopterygii
- Division: Teleostei
- Order: Cypriniformes
- Family: Xenocyprididae
- Genus: Hypophthalmichthys; Bleeker, 1860

Type species
- Leuciscus molitrix Valenciennes, 1844

Species
- see text

Synonyms
- Abramocephalus Steindachner, 1869; Aristichthys Ōshima, 1919; Cephalus Basilewsky, 1855; Onychodon Dybowski, 1872

= Hypophthalmichthys =

Genus of fishes

Hypophthalmichthys is a genus of large freshwater ray-finned fishes belonging to the family Xenocyprididae, the East Asian minnows or sharpbellies. This genus contains three species. The name comes from Greek ὑπό (hypó 'below'), ὀφθαλμός (ophthalmós 'eye'), and ἰχθῦς (ichthŷs 'fish'), thus 'fish with eyes below', referring to the fact that the fish has its eyes below the mouth line.

Members of this genus are native to fresh water in East Asia, ranging from Siberia to Vietnam, but have been widely introduced outside their native range, where often considered invasive. Bighead carp (Hypophthalmichthys nobilis) and silver carp (Hypophthalmichthys molitrix) were initially introduced in the southern Mississippi River basin but have been observed as far north as the Illinois River system outside of Lake Michigan. There are growing concerns of them becoming established in the Great Lakes, where stakeholders, such as fisheries, recreationists, and the fishing industry may be impacted economically, due to a potential decrease in biodiversity or even extinctions of species inhabiting the lakes. Environmental DNA has been used to monitor these species and look for positive eDNA detections and the presence of live organisms. Besides the Latin name, the genus is also known as tolstolob in the Russian language.

== Species ==
These are the currently recognized species in this genus

- Hypophthalmichthys harmandi Sauvage, 1884 (Largescale silver carp)
- Hypophthalmichthys molitrix (Valenciennes, 1844) (Silver carp)
- Hypophthalmichthys nobilis (J. Richardson, 1845) (Bighead carp)
