= Song Wusao =

Song Wusao (Chinese: 宋五嫂,fl. 1179), was a Chinese restaurant owner.

She fled from Kaifeng when it was taken by the Jurchen in 1126 and settled in the new capital of Hangzhou, where she founded a net of restaurants and was eventually favored by Emperor Gaozong of Song with providing the imperial court with fish, which made her famous and rich. Her famous fish soup became a traditional dish in Hangzhou, and she is also said to be the inventor of the dish vinegar fish famed by the restaurant Louwalou.
