= Span (design firm) =

American multidisciplinary studio

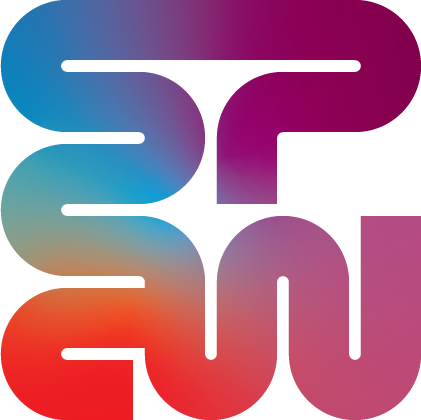
- Type: LLC
- Industry: Design
- Founded: 2020; 6 years ago in Chicago, Illinois
- Founders: John Pobojewski, Bud Rodecker
- Headquarters: Chicago, Illinois
- Key people: Bud Rodecker (Founding Partner); John Pobojewski (Founding Partner); Nick Adam (Associate Partner)
- Website: span.studio

Span is an American multidisciplinary studio in Chicago, Illinois, specializing in identity design, branding, exhibition design, environmental graphics, motion graphics, interactive design, and publications. It was founded in 2020 by Bud Rodecker and John Pobojewski who both worked at the design studio Thirst with Rick Valicenti. In 2023, Nick Adam became Associate Partner.

== Notable projects ==
In 2024, Span led the rebranding of one of Chicago's oldest institutions, the Peggy Notebaert Nature Museum. The studio used the prairie as a key design inspiration

The rebrand of the invasive species of carps—which were widely referred to as Asian carp—as Copi, along with the tagline “Eat Well. Do Good.” The Copi renaming is a part of a Federal and state initiative to get the public to eat the invasive fish, decrease its numbers in Midwestern waterways, and prevent its introduction to the Great Lakes.

The identity and brand identity system for Chicago's Regional Transportation Authority (Illinois).

The short 3D animation/motion graphics films called Urban Sequoia -- about buildings that absorb carbon--which premiered at the UN Climate Change Conferences in 2021 and 2022.

The exhibition graphics for Design and Healing: Creative Responses to Epidemics at the Cooper Hewitt, Smithsonian Design Museum.

The rebrand of and brand identity for New York state’s Nazareth University.

The identity for Bronzeville, Chicago’s new public park, the South Side Sanctuary.

Co-producing with Manual Cinema the puppetry + digital animation film, Countdown.

Designing Slow & Low, a retrospective book of Chicago’s Lowrider community.

== Awards ==
- Anthem Awards for Sustainability, Environment & Climate, 2023.
- AIGA 365, 2022.
- Society of Typographic Arts, STA 100, 2020, 2021, 2022, 2023.
- AIGA 365, 2024.

== Identities designed ==
Logo for Copi the new name for Asian carp

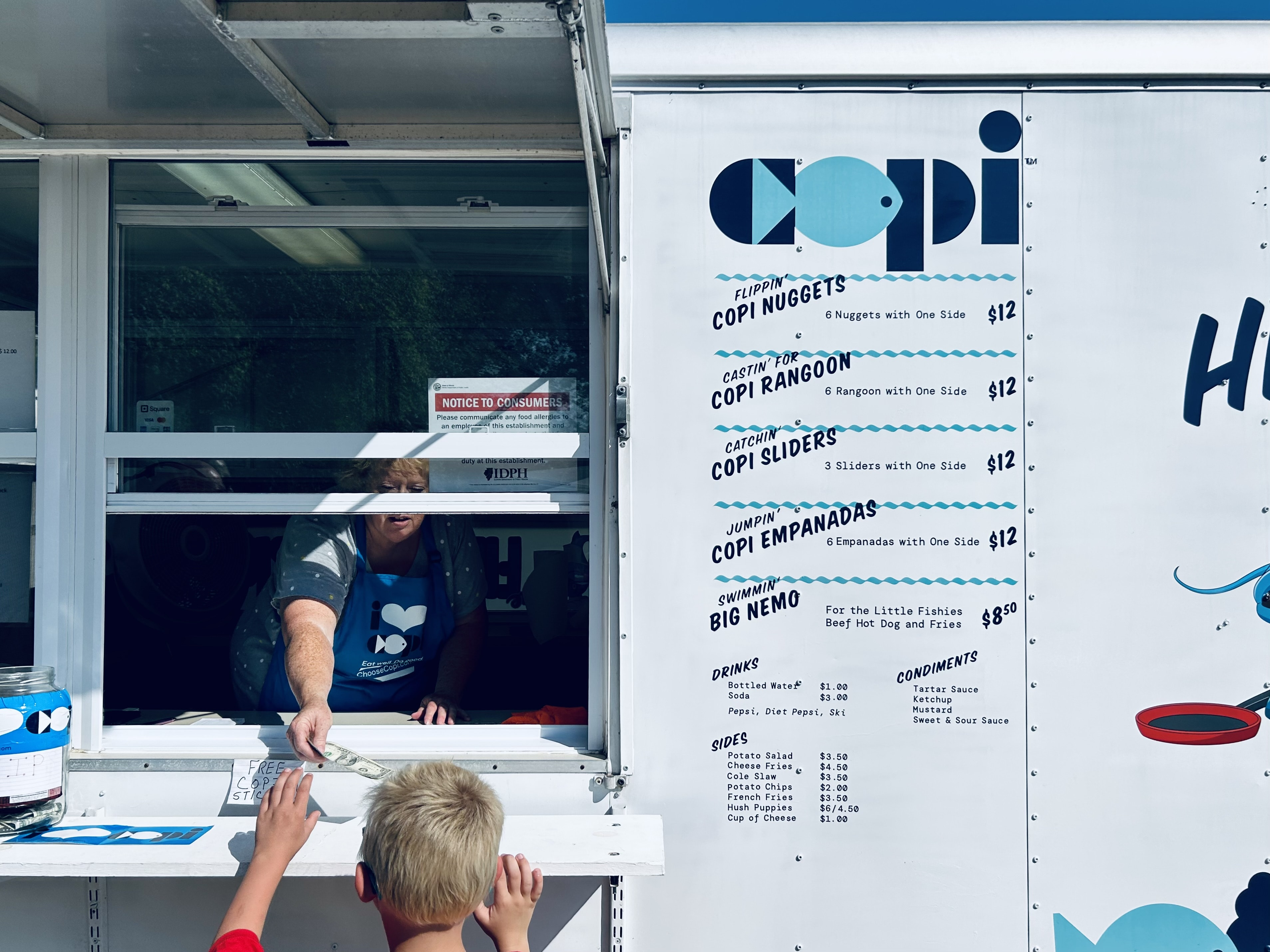
The Copi food truck at the 2023 Illinois State Fair in Springfield Illinois

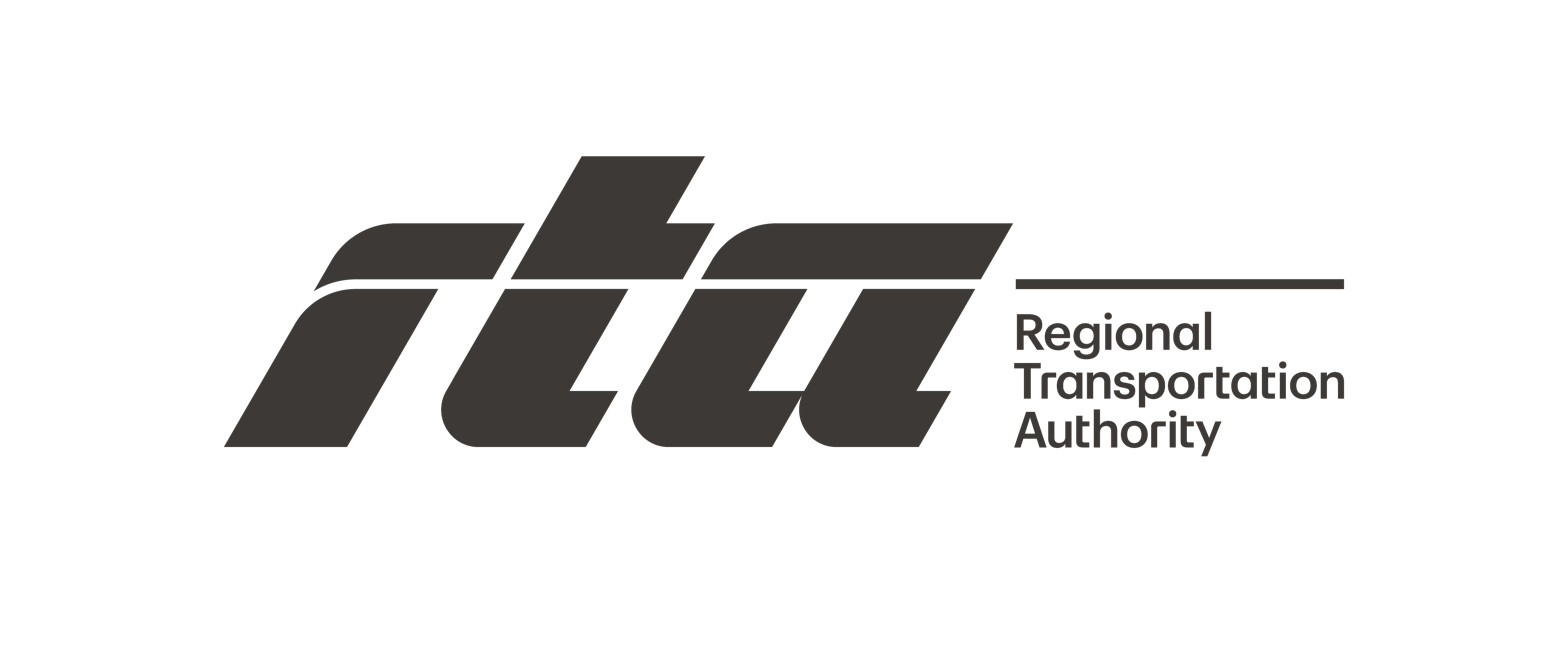
Chicago's Regional Transportation Authority logo

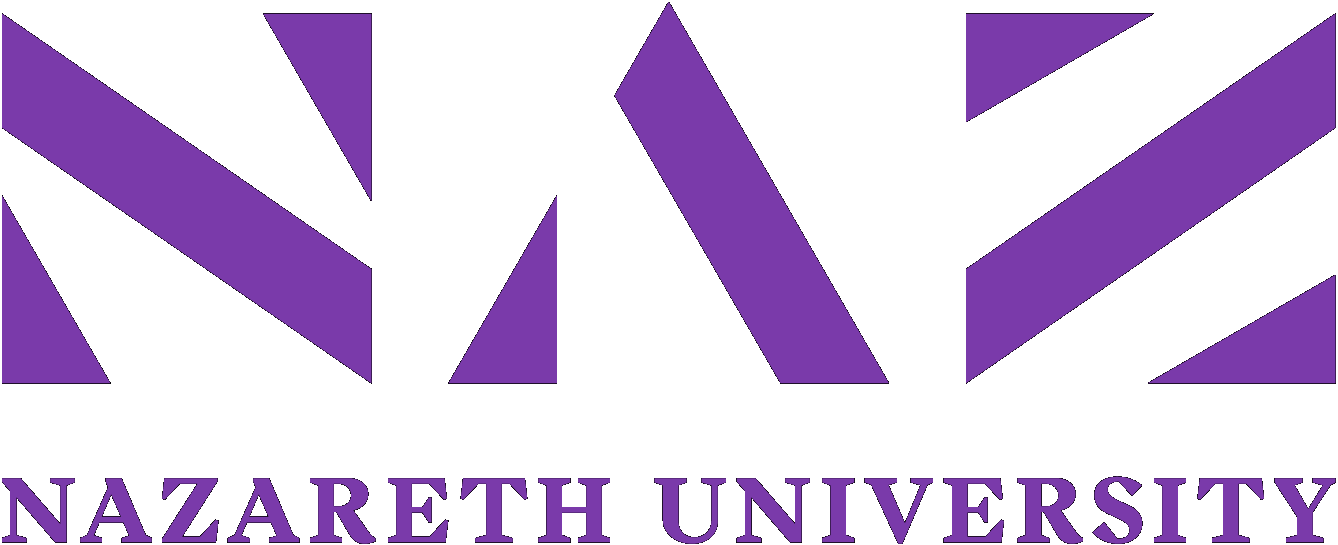
Identity for Nazareth University, rebranded as NAZ

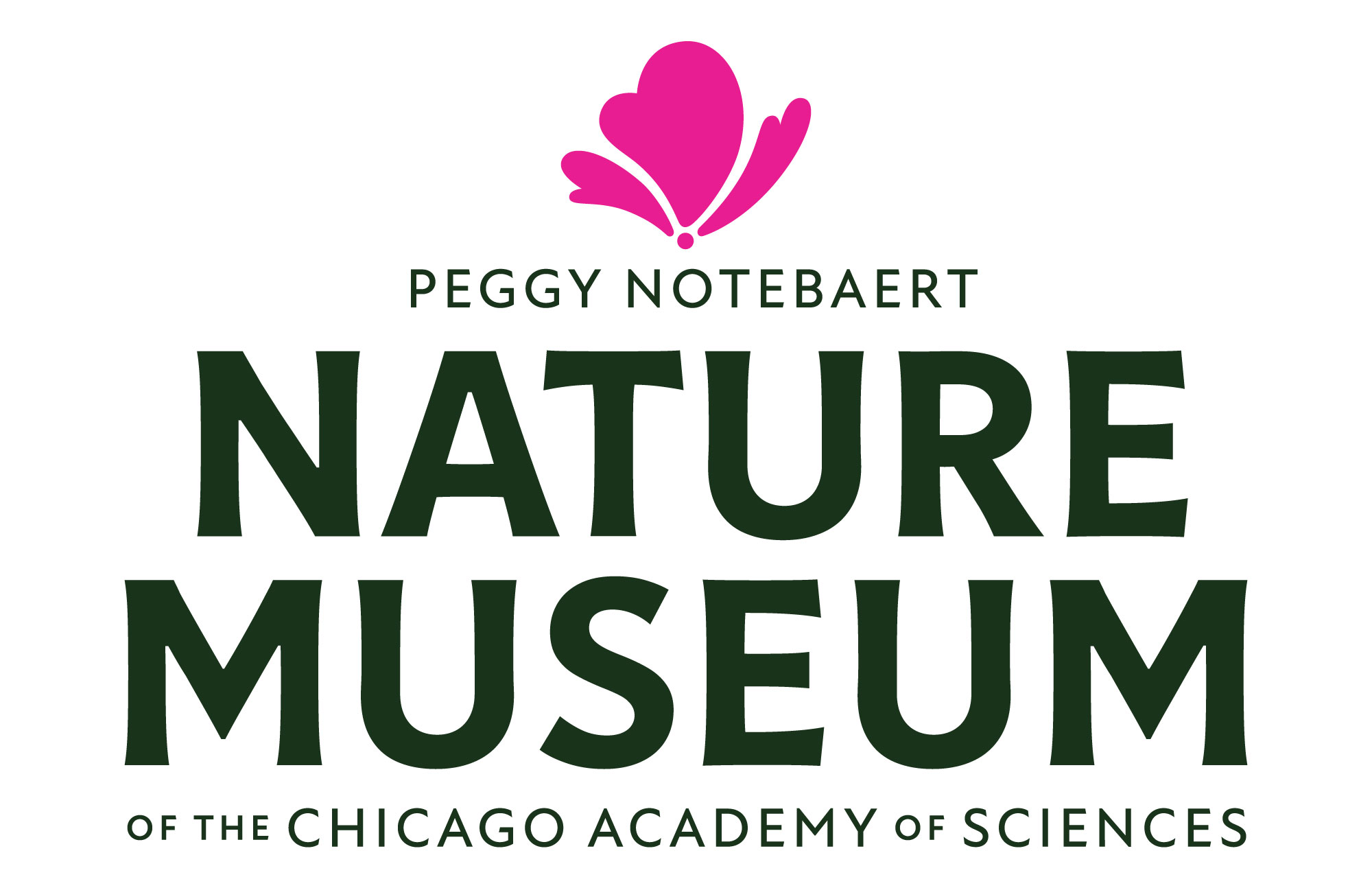
Identity for Chicago's Nature Museum
