= Span (surname) =

Span or Špan is a surname and may refer to:

- Anna Span, pseudonym of Anna Imogen Thompson (born 1972), English pornographic film director
- Brian Span (born 1992), American soccer player
- Denard Span (born 1984), American baseball player
- Emil Span (1869–1944), German painter in Costa Rica
- Henrik Span (1634–1694), Danish shipbuilder and admiral
- Jan Špan (born 1992), Slovenian basketball player
- Josef Span (born 1962), Austrian weightlifter
- Slavko Špan (1938–2021), Slovenian middle-distance runner

== See also ==
- Spann
