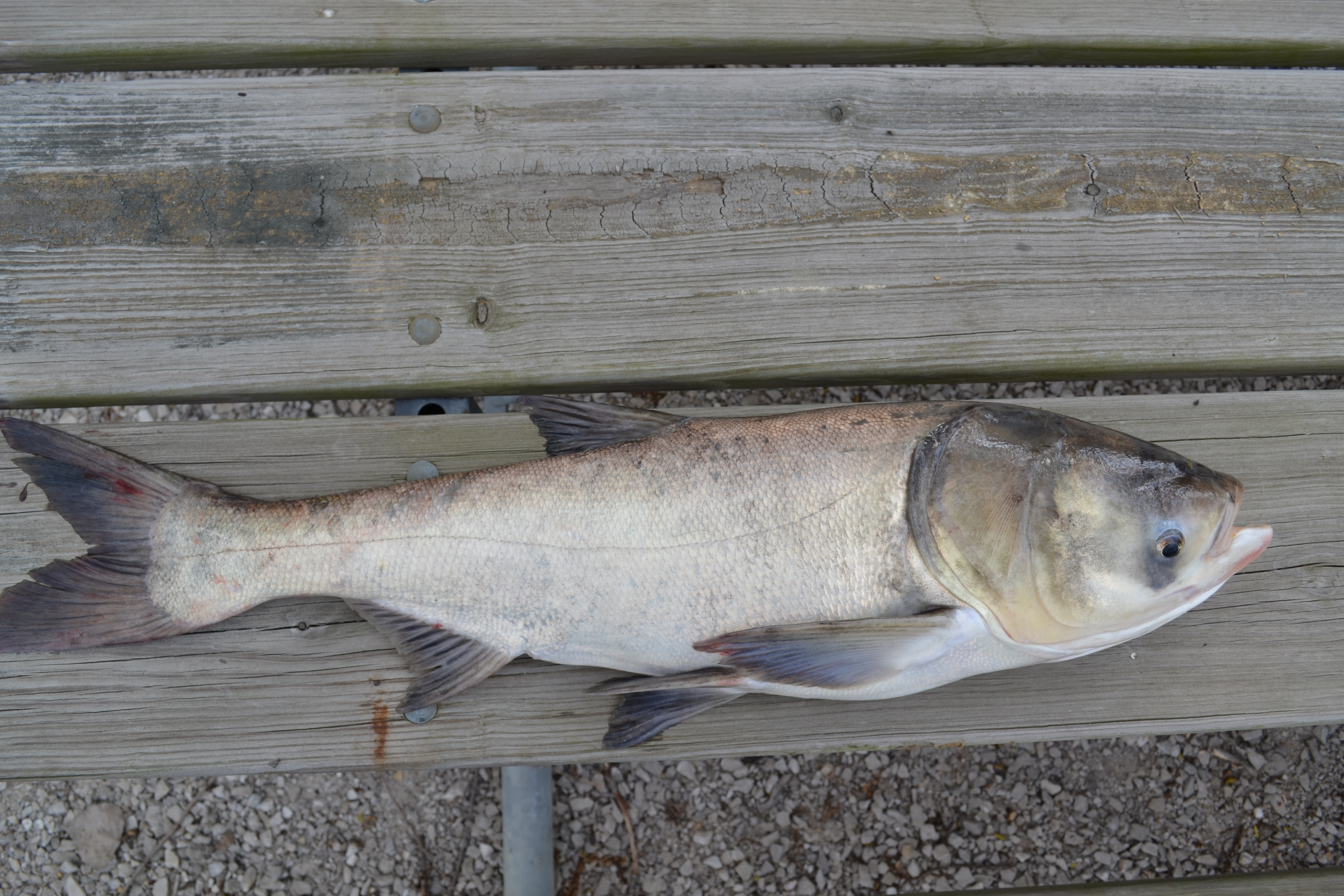

Conservation status
- Data Deficient (IUCN 3.1)

Scientific classification
- Kingdom: Animalia
- Phylum: Chordata
- Class: Actinopterygii
- Division: Teleostei
- Order: Cypriniformes
- Suborder: Cyprinoidei
- Family: Xenocyprididae
- Genus: Hypophthalmichthys; Oshima, 1919
- Species: H. nobilis

Binomial name
- Hypophthalmichthys nobilis (J. Richardson, 1845)

Synonyms
- Hypophthalmichthys mantschuricus Kner, 1867; Leuciscus nobilis Richardson, 1845; Aristichthys nobilis (Richardson, 1845)

= Bighead carp =

Species of fish

The bighead carp (Hypophthalmichthys nobilis) is a species of cyprinid freshwater fish native to East Asia, and is one of several Asian carps introduced into North America. It is one of the most intensively exploited fishes in fish farming, with an annual worldwide production of over three million tonnes in 2013, principally from China. They are omnivores, consuming both algae and zooplankton.

Bighead carp, together with black carp, silver carp, and grass carp, make up the culturally important "four famous domestic fishes" used in polyculture in China for over a thousand years. It is widely farmed for food.

== Distribution ==
Bighead carp are native to large rivers and are associated with floodplain lakes of eastern Asia. Their range extends from southern China north to the Amur River system, which forms the border between China and Russia.

=== Non-native range ===
They have been introduced widely outside their native range, including in the United States, where they are considered invasive as they out-compete native species (e.g. bigmouth buffalo). They are also found in the Nile in North Africa.

In the Volga River basin, the Silver carp and Bighead carp are primarily found in the reservoirs of the Lower Volga, the unregulated part, and the delta. There is evidence of natural reproduction (prelarval and early fry stages) in the lower zone of the Volga River Delta.

== Description ==
The bighead carp has a large, scaleless head, a large mouth, and eyes located very low on the head. Adults usually have a mottled silver-gray coloration. It is a large fish; a typical length is 60 cm (2 ft), and maximum observed size of 146 cm (4 ft 9 in) and 40 kg (88 lb 3 oz).

== Aquaculture ==
Global aquaculture production of Bighead carp (Hypophthalmichthys nobilis) in million tonnes from 1950 to 2022, as reported by the FAO

The bighead carp has a very fast growth rate, which makes it a lucrative and important aquaculture fish, having the fifth-highest production (7.5%) of all cultured freshwater fish worldwide. Its production grew from just 15,306 tonnes in 1950 to 3,059,555 tonnes in 2013, most of the growth being in China.

== Invasive species ==
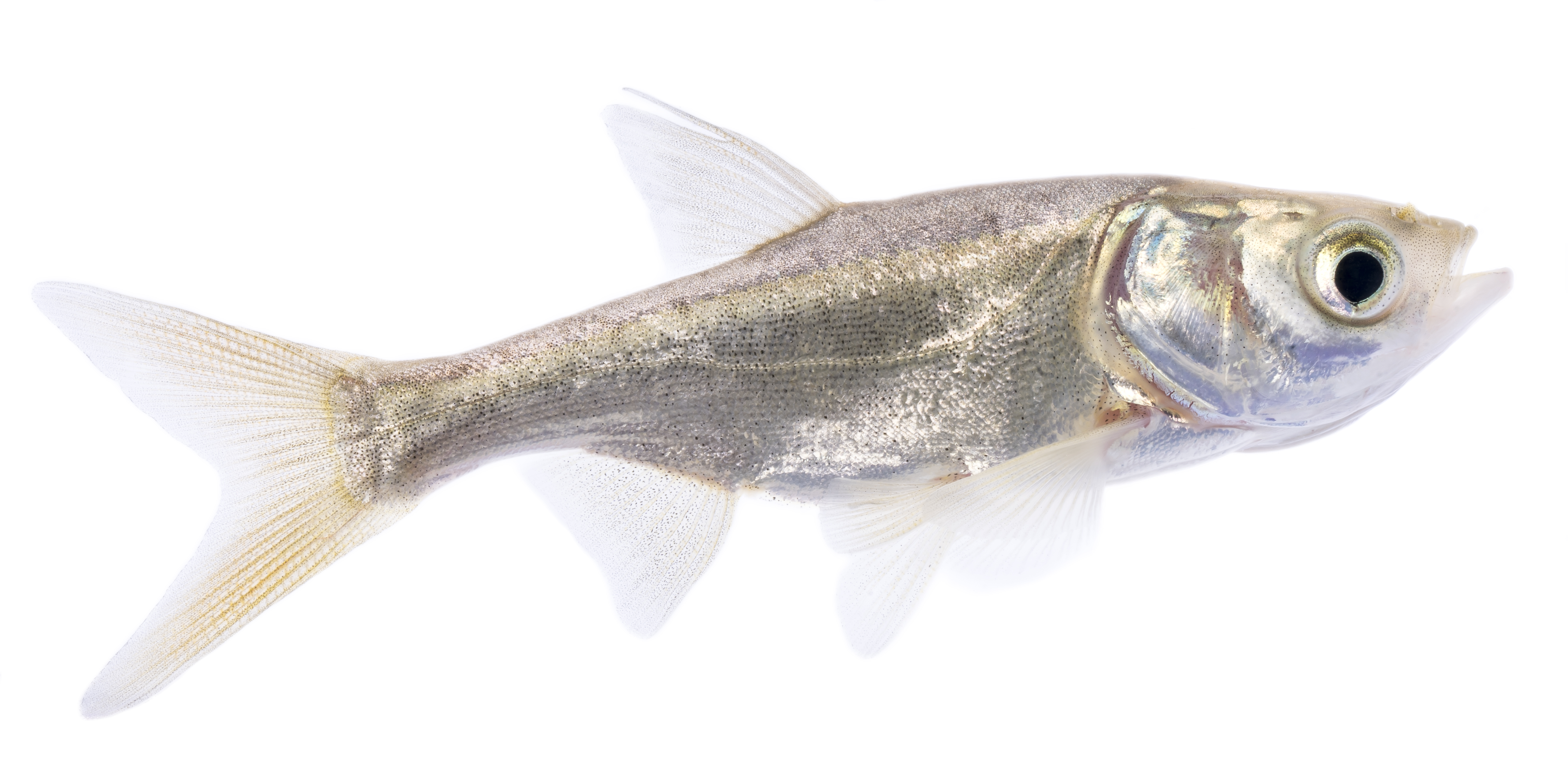
Juvenile

The value of bighead carp as a food fish has caused it to be exported from its native China to more than 70 other countries, where it has invariably escaped or been intentionally released to the wild. Today, the bighead carp can be found in the wild in Europe, South America and North America. It also has been introduced into most of the Indian subcontinent (India, Pakistan, Bangladesh) and most Southeast Asian countries, as well as to lakes in western China where it is not native. Bighead carp are not always considered undesirable, invasive species where they are introduced outside their native range, and they continue to be stocked in some water bodies to support commercial fisheries. Stocking bighead carp or silver carp usually increases the total biomass of fish available for harvest, but can decrease the catch of native and sometimes more valuable fish.

Bighead carp are considered a highly destructive invasive species in the United States. Bighead carp and the closely related silver carp (H. molitrix) were imported to the United States to remove excess or undesirable plankton, thus improve water quality in sewage treatment plants and aquaculture facilities. However, some fish escaped into the Mississippi River basin, where they are now firmly established. A national plan for the control of Asian carps, including bighead carp, was finalized in late 2007.

In the United States, a limited consumer market has developed for bighead carp, particularly in ethnic communities, and they are farmed in ponds for this purpose. The live or very freshly killed fish is most lucrative. Because of this, bighead carp are often transported live, and may be a high risk factor for the eventual spread of the fish, either through release by the end purchaser, or through escape during transport. Another potential avenue for unintentional spread of bighead carp is through use as live fishing bait.

Communities are attempting to contain the spread of the extremely invasive bighead carp. New York state has banned the import and possession of live bighead carp, with the exception of New York City, where they still may be legally sold in live food markets (but they must be killed before they leave the premises). Possession of live bighead carp has been illegal in Illinois since 2005. Since February 2007, using live bighead carp as fishing bait has been illegal in Missouri. In December 2010, the U.S. Congress banned the importation of bighead carp.

Live bighead carp are also banned from sale in Canada. Several Greater Toronto Area Asian supermarkets have been fined in the past for selling them. The Ontario Ministry of Natural Resources banned the live sale and importation into Ontario in 2004. Fines are only CAD$3500.00 and have done little to deter the possession of this fish; underground selling continues to happen in several Chinese supermarkets in the region. One live carp was found in Toronto's Don River in 2003.

Killed carp can still be sold in stores, but Asian retailers and consumers prefer live over killed fish. Killed carp is cut into pieces: head, fillet and tail.

== Meat ==
=== Singapore ===
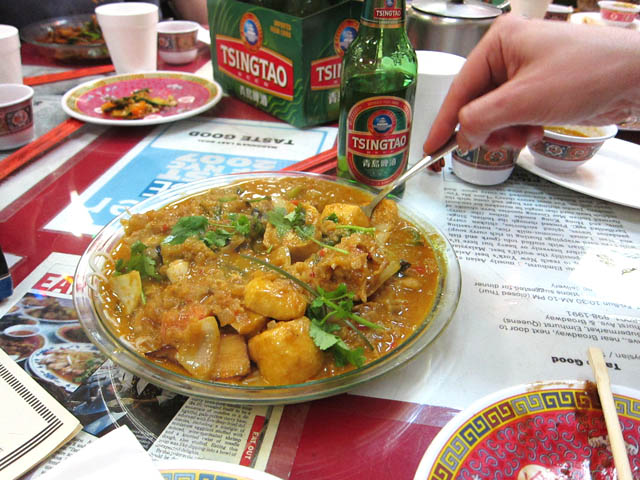
Fish head casserole, a popular dish in Jiangsu cuisine

In Singapore, it is known by the Chinese name 松鱼 (sōng yú). The head of the bighead carp is particularly prized in Singapore, and is usually steamed whole.

=== North America ===
Although the bighead carp is enjoyed in many parts of the world, it has not become a popular food fish in North America. Acceptance there has been hindered in part by the name "carp", thus popular association with the common carp, which is not a generally favored foodfish in North America. The flesh of the bighead carp is white and firm, and not similar to that of the common carp, which is darker and richer. Bighead carp flesh does share one unfortunate similarity with common carp flesh - both have intramuscular bones within the filet. However, bighead carp captured from the wild in the United States tend to be much larger than common carp, so the intramuscular bones are also larger and less problematic. The Louisiana State University Agricultural Research and Extension Center has a series of videos showing how to prepare the fish and deal with these bones.

== Sport fishing ==
Although bighead carp reach large size, they are difficult to capture with a rod and reel because of their filter-feeding habits. They may be captured by the "suspension method" used to catch silver carp, or where legal, by snagging with a weighted treble hook through the water. When bowfishing, Bighead carp cannot be shot in the air like silver carp, because they do not jump out of the water when startled by moving boats like the silver carp do. However, they often feed near the surface, where they can be shot by bowfishers, for whom they are popular targets.

== See also ==
- Fish head casserole
