= Spanner (surname) =

Spanner is a surname. Notable people with the surname include:

- Anita Spanner (born 1960), Austrian singer Anita
- Chimp Spanner (fl. 2000s), pseudonym of musician Paul Ortiz
- Rudolf Spanner (fl. 1940s), German physician
- Russel Spanner (1916 - 1974), a Canadian designer
- Spanner Banner, Jamaican singer
